= March 10 (Eastern Orthodox liturgics) =

Day in the Eastern Orthodox liturgical calendar

Eastern Orthodox liturgical calendar
March 9	March 10	March 11
March 10 O.S. ≍ March 23 N.S. March 10 N.S ≍ February 25 (or February 26 (Note: in a leap year)) O.S.

An Eastern Orthodox cross

March 10 in Eastern Orthodox liturgical calendars is a feast day and a day of commemoration of saints and martyrs. Although some Orthodox churches use the Revised Julian Calendar and others use the traditional Julian calendar, the fixed commemorations for their respective March 10 are broadly the same, no matter which calendar is used. (Note: Despite the dates being the same, the days to which they refer typically differ by 13 days. The notation Old Style or O.S. is sometimes used to indicate a date in the traditional Julian Calendar (the "Old Calendar"). The notation New Style or N.S. indicates a date in the Revised Julian calendar (the "New Calendar").)

== Saints ==
- Martyr Codratus (Quadratus), and with him Martyrs Cyprian, Dionysius, Anectus, Paul, Crescens, and Dionysius (another), at Corinth (251)
- Martyrs Victorinus, Victor, Nicephorus, Claudius, Diodorus, Serapion, Papias, and others, at Corinth (251 or 258) (see also: January 31)
- Martyrs Codratus, Saturninus, and Rufinus, of Nicomedia (250-259) (see also: March 7)
- Martyr Marcian, by scourging.
- Saint Anastasia the Patrician, of Alexandria (567)
- Saint George Arselaites (6th century)
- Venerable Agathon, ascetic at the Monastery of St Symeon near Aleppo in Syria, reposed in peace.

== Pre-Schism Western saints ==
- Martyr Victor, in North Africa under Decius. (Note: "In Africa, the martyr St. Victor, on whose festival St Augustine delivered a discourse to his people.")
- Saint Silvester (Sylvester), a companion of St Palladius in enlightening Ireland (c. 420) (Note: Palladius was accompanied by four companions: Sylvester and Solinus, who remained after him in Ireland; and Augustinus and Benedictus, who followed him to Britain, but returned to their own country after his death. Palladius is most strongly associated with Leinster, particularly with Clonard, County Meath.)
- Saint Simplicius, Pope of Rome (468-483), who upheld the decisions of the Council of Chalcedon against Monophysitism, and dealt with the Arian King Odoacer after the Fall of the Western Roman Empire in 476 (483)
- Saint Droctoveus (Drotté), a disciple of St Germanus of Paris (c. 580) (Note: A disciple of St Germanus of Paris, he became Abbot of St Symphorian in Autun in France. Later he was called back to Paris to be the first Abbot of St Vincent and the Holy Cross - afterwards renamed Saint-Germain-des-Prés.)
- Saint Kessog (Mackessog), an Irish missionary of the mid-sixth century active in the Lennox area and southern Perthshire (c. 560) (Note: Born in Cashel in Tipperary in Ireland, even as a child he is said to have worked miracles. He became a missionary and preached in Scotland, where he became a bishop. According to one tradition he was martyred at Bandry. He is the patron-saint of Lennox.)
- Saint Sedna (Sétna, Sidonius), Bishop of Ossory in Ireland and a friend of St Luanus (c. 570)
- Saint Attalus (Attala), Abbot of Bobbio Abbey (626) (Note: Born in Burgundy in France, he became a monk at Lérins. From there he went to Luxeuil with St Columbanus, whom he followed to Bobbio in the north of Italy, helping him to found the monastery there and succeeding him as abbot (615).)
- Saint Himelin, an Irish or Scottish priest who, returning from a pilgrimage to Rome, fell ill when passing through Vissenaken (c. 750)
- Saint Emilian (Eminian), born in Ireland, he became a monk and then Abbot of Lagny (Abbaye Saint-Pierre de Lagny) in France (675)
- Saint Failbhe the Little (Fáilbe mac Pípáin), Abbot of Iona in Scotland, where he reposed at the age of eighty (754)

== Post-Schism Orthodox saints ==
- Venerable John of Khakhuli Monastery, Georgia, called Chrysostom, reposed on Mount Athos (10th-11th century) (Note: Note: There is another Georgian Saint named John, from Georgia, also of the same period, and also an Athonite, but is commemorated on June 12: St. John (Tornicus) of Mt. Athos and Georgia (998))
- New Martyr Michael of Agrapha (Michael of Soluneia), at Thessalonica (1544 or 1547) (Note: He was burned alive on March 21, 1547 for his refusal to convert to Islam. However the Great Euchologion lists his feast day as March 10, 1544.) (see also: March 21)
- Saint Paul of Taganrog (Pavel of Taganrog) (1879) (Note: "A Ukrainian from Chernihiv, St Paul was a holy layman who lived at Taganrog to the east of the Black Sea. An ascetic who slept on a wooden board, he was constantly in prayer and would receive very many people who came to him for advice. Russian biographies of him note that he constantly spoke his native Ukrainian language. Today there is a Ukrainian embroidered "rushnyk" mantle-towel over the door of his home which is Taganrog’s greatest religious shrine.")
- Saint Alexander (Badanin), Priest, of Vologda (1913) (Note: See: (in Russian) Александр Вологодский. Википедии, (Russian Wikipedia).)

=== New martyrs and confessors ===
- New Hieromartyr Demetrius Legeydo, Priest (1938)

== Other commemorations ==
- Commemoration of the Desert-dwellers of the Roslavl Forests near Bryansk.

== Icon gallery ==
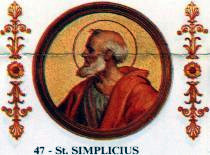
Saint Simplicius, Pope of Rome (468-483).

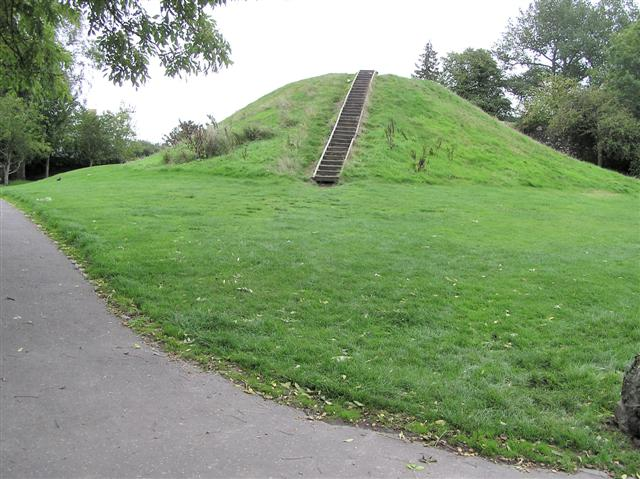
Tom Na Kessaig (Hill of St. Kessog). The mound dates from the 6th century and is located at The Meadows in Callander.

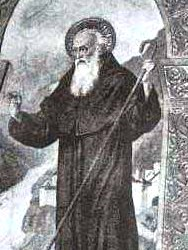
Saint Attalus (Attala), Abbot of Bobbio Abbey.

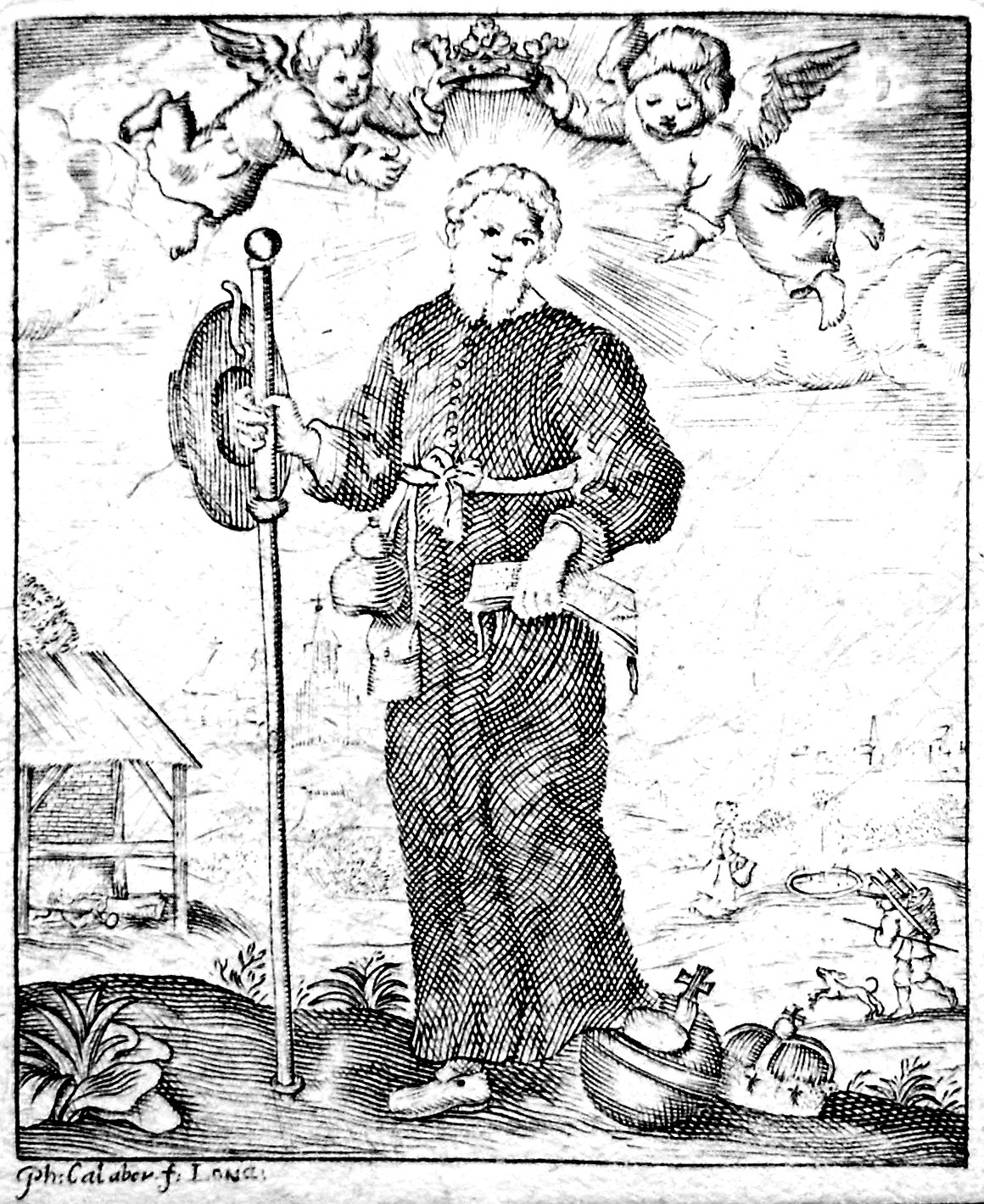
Saint Himelin.

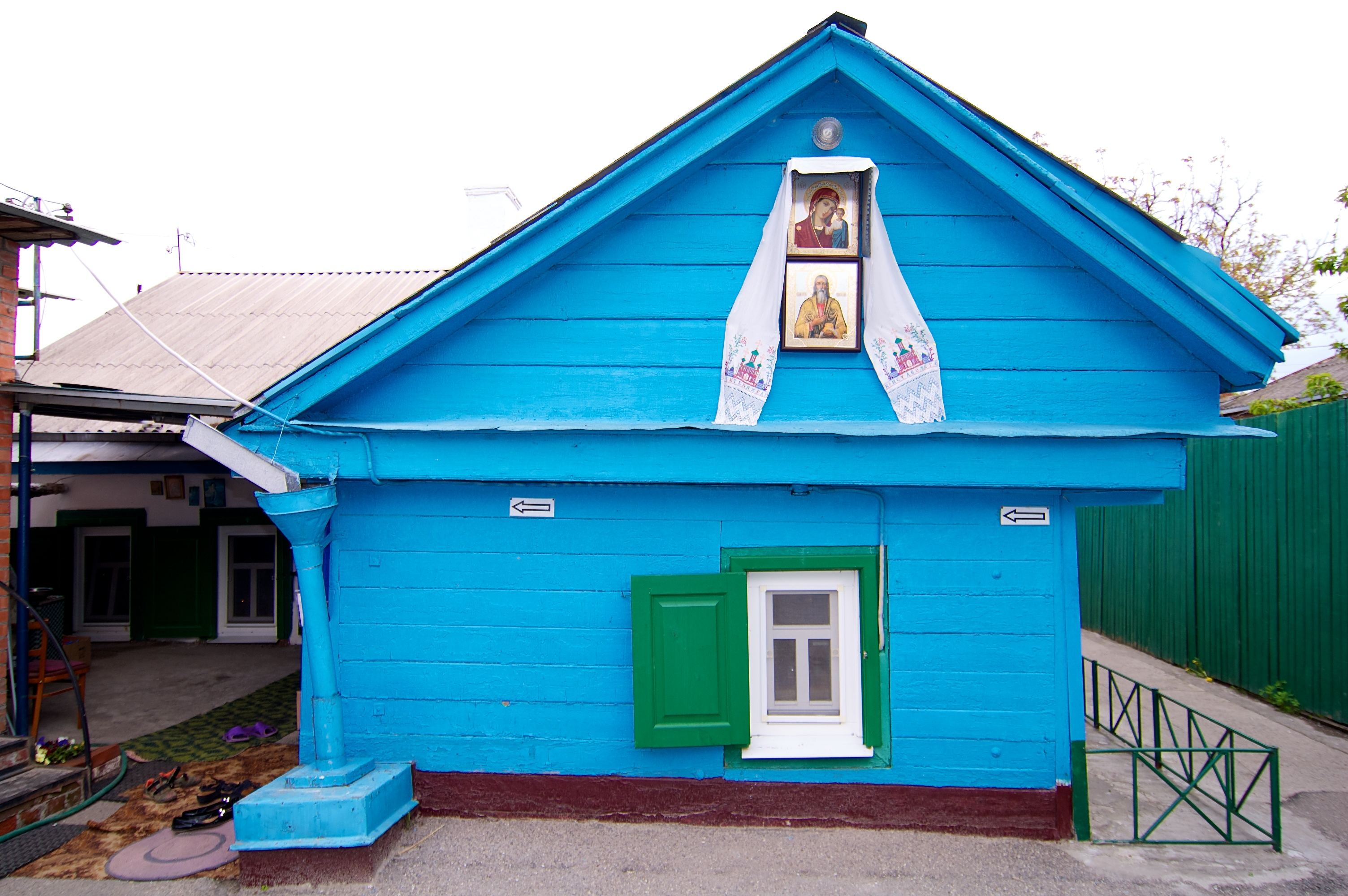
Kelya of Saint Pavel of Taganrog.

== Sources ==
- March 10/March 23. Orthodox Calendar (PRAVOSLAVIE.RU).
- March 23 / March 10. HOLY TRINITY RUSSIAN ORTHODOX CHURCH (A parish of the Patriarchate of Moscow).
- March 10. OCA - The Lives of the Saints.
- The Autonomous Orthodox Metropolia of Western Europe and the Americas (ROCOR). St. Hilarion Calendar of Saints for the year of our Lord 2004. St. Hilarion Press (Austin, TX). pp. 20–21.
- March 10. Latin Saints of the Orthodox Patriarchate of Rome.
- The Roman Martyrology. Transl. by the Archbishop of Baltimore. Last Edition, According to the Copy Printed at Rome in 1914. Revised Edition, with the Imprimatur of His Eminence Cardinal Gibbons. Baltimore: John Murphy Company, 1916. pp. 71–72.

Greek Sources

- Great Synaxaristes: (in Greek) 10 ΜΑΡΤΙΟΥ. ΜΕΓΑΣ ΣΥΝΑΞΑΡΙΣΤΗΣ.
- (in Greek) Συναξαριστής. 10 Μαρτίου. ECCLESIA.GR. (H ΕΚΚΛΗΣΙΑ ΤΗΣ ΕΛΛΑΔΟΣ).

Russian Sources

- (in Russian) 23 марта (10 марта). Православная Энциклопедия под редакцией Патриарха Московского и всея Руси Кирилла (электронная версия). (Orthodox Encyclopedia - Pravenc.ru).
- (in Russian) 10 марта (ст.ст.) 23 марта 2013 (нов. ст.). Русская Православная Церковь Отдел внешних церковных связей. (DECR).
