= February 27 (Eastern Orthodox liturgics) =

Day in the Eastern Orthodox liturgical calendar

Eastern Orthodox liturgical calendar
February 26	February 27	February 28
February 27 O.S. ≍ March 12 (or March 11 (Note: in a leap year)) N.S. February 27 N.S ≍ February 14 O.S.

An Eastern Orthodox cross

February 27 in Eastern Orthodox liturgical calendars is a feast day and a day of commemoration of saints and martyrs. Although some Orthodox churches use the Revised Julian Calendar and others use the traditional Julian calendar, the fixed commemorations for their respective February 27 are broadly the same, no matter which calendar is used. (Note: Despite the dates being the same, the days to which they refer typically differ by 13 days. The notation Old Style or O.S. is sometimes used to indicate a date in the traditional Julian Calendar (the "Old Calendar"). The notation New Style or N.S. indicates a date in the Revised Julian calendar (the "New Calendar").)

== Saints ==
- Martyrs Julian and his disciple Eunos (Kronion), at Alexandria (250- 252) (Note: "At Alexandria, the passion of St. Julian, martyr. Although he was so afflicted with the gout that he could neither walk, not stand, he was taken before the judge with two servants, who carried him in a chair. One of these denied his faith, but the other, named Eunus, persevered with Julian in confessing Christ. Both were set on camels, led through the whole city, scourged, and burned alive in the presence of the people.")
- Martyrs Abundius, Alexander, Antigonus, Calanus, Januarius, Makarios, Severianus, Titianus and Fortunatus, and those martyred with them (c. 284–305) (Note: "AT Rome, the birthday of the holy martyrs Alexander, Abundius, Antigonus, and Fortunatus.") (Note: "At Antioch, Saints Fortunatus, Felix and 27 Others, Martyrs." They are recorded in ancient martyrologies.)
- Martyr Gelasius the Actor, of Heliopolis (297)
- Martyr Nesius, by whipping.
- Saint Macarius of Jerusalem, Bishop of Jerusalem (334)
- Saint Thalelæus of Syria, hermit, of Gabala in Syria (c. 460)
- Saints Asclepius and Jacob of Nimouza, monks near Cyrrhus (5th century)
- Saint Stephen, monk, of Constantinople (614)
- Venerable Procopius the Confessor, of Decapolis (c. 750)
- Saint Timothy of Caesarea, monk. (Note: It is uncertain if he is the same individual as "Saint Timothy the Confessor" who is commemorated on February 1.)

== Pre-Schism Western saints ==
- Saint Honorina (Honorine), an early martyr in the north of France. (Note: Her relics are still venerated in Conflans Ste Honorine near Paris.)
- Saint Comgan, Abbot of Glenthsen or Killeshin in Ireland (c. 565)
- Saint Leander of Seville, Archbishop of Seville (600) (Note: "At Seville, in Spain, the birthday of St. Leander, bishop of that city, by whose preaching and labors, with the assistance of King Recared, the nation of the Visigoths was converted from the Arian impiety to the Catholic faith.") (Note: The elder brother of Sts Fulgentius, Isidore and Florentina. He entered a monastery in his early youth and was later sent to Constantinople on a diplomatic mission. There he met St Gregory the Great, who became a close friend. On his return to Spain, Leander became Archbishop of Seville. He revised and unified the Spanish liturgy, converted St Hermenegild and helped convert the Visigoths from Arianism. He was responsible for holding two national Councils at Toledo in 589 and 590.)
- Saint Baldomerus (Galmier), by trade a locksmith in Lyon in France, who entered the monastery of St Justus (c. 650) (Note: "At Lyon, St. Baldomer, a man of God, whose tomb is made illustrious by frequent miracles.")
- Saint Ælfnoth of Stowe (Alnoth), a hermit at Stowe near Bugbrooke, martyred by robbers (c. 700)
- Saint Herefrith of Louth, Bishop of Lincolnshire (c. 873) (Note: The relics of this Bishop of Lindsey, probably martyred by the Danes, were venerated at Thorney in Cambridgeshire in England.)
- Saint John of Gorze, Abbot of Gorze (c. 975) (Note: Born in Vandières near Metz in the east of France, after some years in the world, he made a pilgrimage to Rome. On his return he restored and entered the monastery of Gorze in Lorraine in 933. Emperor Otto I sent him as his ambassador to the Caliph Abd-er-Rahman of Cordoba, where he stayed for two years. In 960 he became Abbot of Gorze.)

== Post-Schism Orthodox saints ==
- Venerable Titus, hieromonk of the Kiev Caves Monastery (1196)
- Saint Titus the Soldier, monk of the Kiev Caves (14th century)
- Saint Pitirim, Bishop of Tambov (1698)
- New Martyr Elias of Trebizond (1749)
- Venerable Archimandrite Photius of the Yuriev Monastery, Novgorod (1838)
- Saint Raphael of Brooklyn, Good Shepherd of the Lost Sheep in America (1915) (New Calendar only see also: February 14)

=== New martyrs and confessors ===
- New Hieromartyr Sergei Uvitsky, Priest (1932)
- New Hieromartyr Peter Uspensky, Priest (1938)
- Martyr Michael Markov (1938)
- Venerable Elder Ephraim of Katounakia (1998) (Note: On October 20, 2019, at the Protaton Church in Karyes on Mt. Athos, Ecumenical Patriarch Bartholomew announced that the glorification of four great 20th-century Athonite elders would soon proceed, including: Daniel of Katounakia (†1929); Ieronymos of Simonopetra (†1957); Joseph the Hesychast (†1959), and; Ephraim of Katounakia (†1998).; He was officially glorified by the Holy Synod of the Ecumenical Patriarchate on March 9, 2020, to be commemorated each year either on: 1) the Saturday of the Ascetic Saints, which is a moveable feast on the last Saturday before Great Lent, or 2) on February 27th; ("ἡμέρα τῆς ἐτησίας ἱερᾶς μνήμης αὐτοῦ ἡ 27η μηνός Φεβρουαρίου").) (see also: February 14)

== Other commemorations ==
- Twelve Holy Greek Architects of the Kiev Caves Lavra.
- Repose of Archimandrite Photius of the Yuriev Monastery, Novgorod (1838)
- Repose of Monk Anthony of Valaam Monastery (1848)
- Repose of Hieromonk Justinian of Valaam Monastery (1966)
- Repose of Archimandrite Alypy (Voronov) of the Pskov-Caves Monastery (1975)

== Icon gallery ==
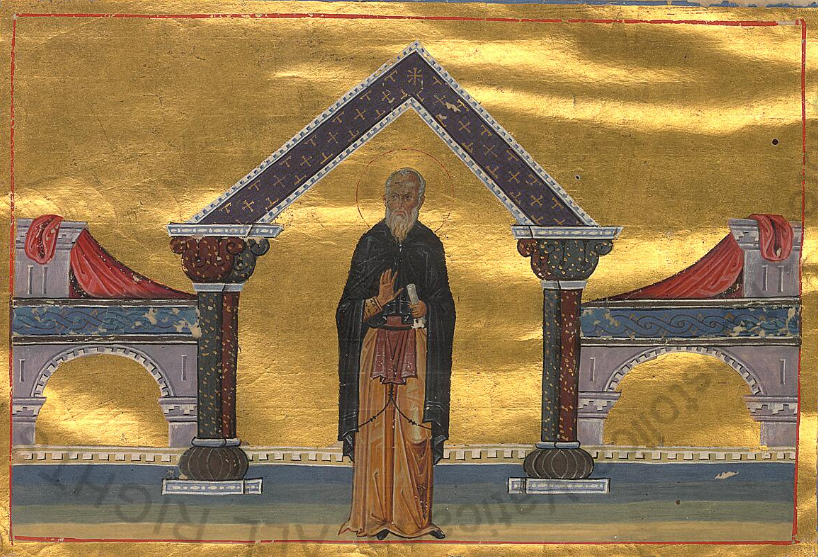
Saint Thalelæus of Syria.

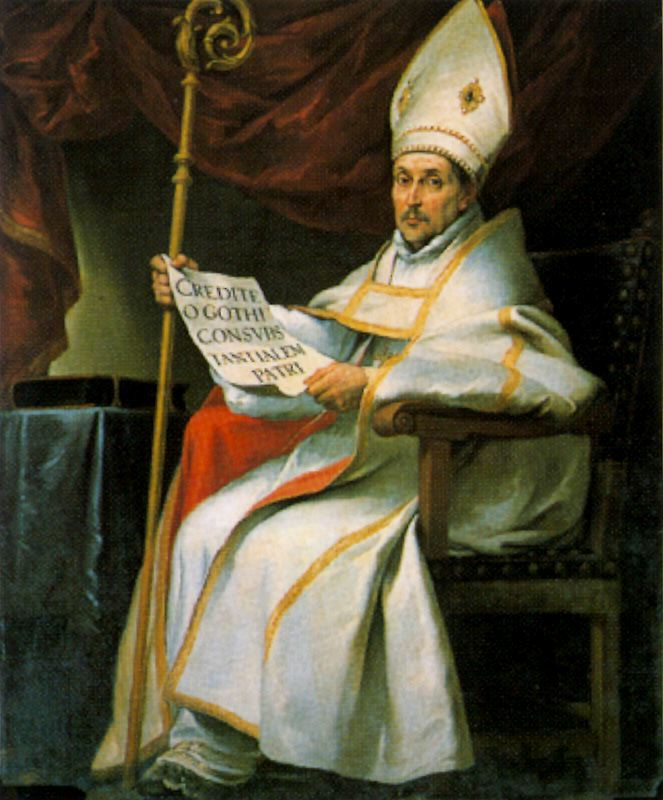
Saint Leander of Seville.

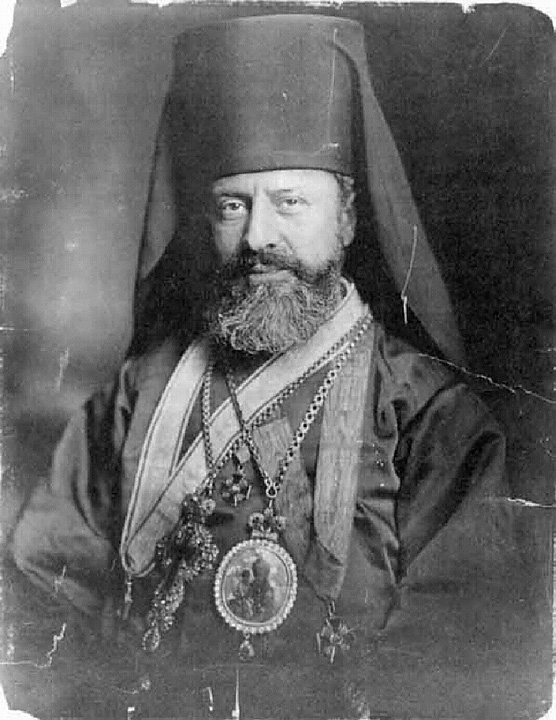
Saint Raphael of Brooklyn.

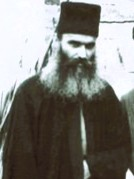
Venerable Elder Ephraim of Katounakia (in 1935).

== Sources ==
- February 27 / March 12. Orthodox Calendar (Pravoslavie.ru).
- March 12 / February 27. Holy Trinity Russian Orthodox Church (A parish of the Patriarchate of Moscow).
- February 27. OCA - The Lives of the Saints.
- The Autonomous Orthodox Metropolia of Western Europe and the Americas. St. Hilarion Calendar of Saints for the year of our Lord 2004. St. Hilarion Press (Austin, TX). p. 18.
- The Twenty-Seventh Day of the Month of February. Orthodoxy in China.
- February 27. Latin Saints of the Orthodox Patriarchate of Rome.
- The Roman Martyrology. Transl. by the Archbishop of Baltimore. Last Edition, According to the Copy Printed at Rome in 1914. Revised Edition, with the Imprimatur of His Eminence Cardinal Gibbons. Baltimore: John Murphy Company, 1916. pp. 60–61.
- Rev. Richard Stanton. A Menology of England and Wales, or, Brief Memorials of the Ancient British and English Saints Arranged According to the Calendar, Together with the Martyrs of the 16th and 17th Centuries. London: Burns & Oates, 1892. pp. 86–98.

Greek Sources

- Great Synaxaristes: (in Greek) 27 Φεβρουαρίου. Μεγασ Συναξαριστησ.
- (in Greek) Συναξαριστής. 27 Φεβρουαρίου. Ecclesia.gr. (H Εκκλησια τησ Ελλαδοσ).

Russian Sources

- (in Russian) 12 марта (27 февраля). Православная Энциклопедия под редакцией Патриарха Московского и всея Руси Кирилла (электронная версия). (Orthodox Encyclopedia - Pravenc.ru).
- (in Russian) 27 февраля (ст.ст.) 12 марта 2014 (нов. ст.). Русская Православная Церковь Отдел внешних церковных связей. (DECR).
