= February 14 (Eastern Orthodox liturgics) =

Day in the Eastern Orthodox liturgical calendar

Eastern Orthodox liturgical calendar
February 13	February 14	February 15
February 14 O.S. ≍ February 27 N.S. February 14 N.S ≍ February 1 O.S.

An Eastern Orthodox cross

February 14 in Eastern Orthodox liturgical calendars is a feast day and a day of commemoration of saints and martyrs. Although some Orthodox churches use the Revised Julian Calendar and others use the traditional Julian calendar, the fixed commemorations for their respective February 14 are broadly the same, no matter which calendar is used. (Note: Despite the dates being the same, the days to which they refer typically differ by 13 days. The notation Old Style or O.S. is sometimes used to indicate a date in the traditional Julian Calendar (the "Old Calendar"). The notation New Style or N.S, indicates a date in the Revised Julian calendar (the "New Calendar").)

== Saints ==
- Saint Peter II, Patriarch of Alexandria (380)
- Venerable Maron of Syria, hermit of Cyrrhus (c. 433)
- Venerable Auxentius of Bithynia, monastic (c. 470)
- Venerable Abraham of Charres, Bishop of Charres in Mesopotamia (5th century)
- Venerable Cyril, Equal-to-the-Apostles, Teacher of the Slavs (869)
- Hieromartyr Philemon of Gaza, Bishop of Gaza (10th century).

== Pre-Schism Western saints ==
- Saint Eleuchadius, a Greek, converted by St Apollinaris of Ravenna in Italy, and succeeded St Adheritus as third Bishop of that city (112) (Note: "At Ravenna, St. Eleuchadius, bishop and confessor.")
- Martyrs Vitalis, Felicula and Zeno, early martyrs in Rome.
- Saint Valentine the Presbyter of Rome, under Claudius II (c. 270) (Note: According to the entry in the Roman Martyrology (1916): "AT Rome, on the Flaminian road, in the time of the emperor Claudius, the birthday of blessed Valentine, priest and martyr, who after having cured and instructed many persons, was beaten with clubs and beheaded."; According to the entry in The Book of Saints, by Ramsgate Abbey (1921): "A Roman priest who, with St. Marius and his family, assisted the Martyrs in the persecution under the Emperor Claudius II. He was beheaded as a Christian about A.D. 270. Modern research has raised many doubts about the genuineness of the tradition concerning him. The custom of sending so-called "Valentines" on Feb. 14 has no connection with the history of the Saint, but is probably of Pagan origin.") (see also: July 6, July 30)
- Hieromartyr Valentine, Bishop of Interamna Nahars, Terni, in Italy (c. 273) (Note: According to the entry in the Roman Martyrology (1916): "At Teramo, St. Valentine, bishop and martyr, who was scourged, committed to prison, and as he remained unshaken in his faith, was taken out of his dungeon in the dead of night and beheaded by order of Placidus, prefect of the city."; According to the entry in The Book of Saints, by Ramsgate Abbey (1921): "A Bishop of Terni, or perhaps of Teramo, in Italy, who suffered martyrdom in the same persecution as the priest St. Valentine of Rome, though it would seem two or three years later."; Various dates are given for the martyrdom or martyrdoms: 269, 270, or 273.) (see also: July 30; April 24)
- Martyrs Proculus, Ephebus and Apollonius, disciples of Hieromartyr Valentine, Bishop of Interamna, Terni, in Italy (c. 273) (Note: "In the same place, the holy martyrs Proculus, Ephebus and Apollonius, who, whilst watching by the body of St. Valentine, were arrested and put to the sword by the command of the ex-consul Leontius.")
- Martyrs Bassus, Anthony, and Protolicus, at Alexandria. (Note: "At Alexandria, the holy martyrs Bassus, Anthony, and Protolicus, who were cast into the sea.")
- Martyr Agatho, Priest, and Companions, at Alexandria. (Note: "Also, the holy martyrs Cyrion, priest, Bassian, lector, Agatho, exorcist, and Moses, who perished in the flames and took their flight to heaven.")
- Saint Nostrianus, Bishop of Naples in Italy and a valiant opponent of Arianism and Pelagianism (c. 450)
- Saint Theodosius, Bishop of Vaison in France and predecessor of St Quinidius (554)
- Saint Conran, a bishop of the Orkney Islands.
- Saint Antoninus of Sorrento, a monk in one of the daughter monasteries of Monte Cassino in Italy, became Abbot of St Agrippinus (830) (Note: A monk in one of the daughter monasteries of Montecassino in Italy. Forced to leave his monastery by the wars raging in the country, he became a hermit, until he was invited by the people of Sorrento to live among them. He did so as Abbot of St Agrippinus. He is now venerated as the patron-saint of that town.) (Note: "At Sorrento, St. Anthony, abbot, who, when the monastery' of Monte Cassino was devastated by the Lombards, withdrew into a solitude of the neighborhood, where, celebrated for holiness, he passed calmly to his repose in God. His body is daily glorified by many miracles, and particularly by the deliverance of possessed persons.")

== Post-Schism Orthodox saints ==
- Venerable Isaac, recluse of the Kiev Caves Monastery (c. 1090)
- New Martyr Nicholas of Corinth (1554)
- New Monk-martyr Damian of Philotheou and Kissavos, at Larissa (1568)
- New Martyr George the Tailor, of Mytilene, at Constantinople (1693)
- Venerable Auxentios the Ascetic, of Mount Katirlion near Nicomedia on the Propontis, Wonderworker (c. 1757) (Note: He was the spiritual confessor of Patriarch Cyril V of Constantinople, whom he supported during the Council of Constantinople (1755-56) when the Patriarch decreed that Western converts must be baptized upon their reception into the Orthodox Church.)
- Saint Hilarion the Georgian (the New) of Imereti and Mt. Athos (1864)
- Saint Raphael (Hawaweeny), Bishop of Brooklyn (1915) (Old style date see also: February 27)

=== New martyrs and confessors ===
- New Hieromartyr Nikolaos of Trebizond, Bishop of Amisos (1920)
- New Hieromartyr Onesimus (Pylaev), Bishop of Tula (1937)
- New Hieromartyr Tryphon, Deacon (1938)

== Other commemorations ==
- 12 Greeks who built the Dormition Cathedral in the Kiev Caves, Far Caves, Lavra (11th century)
- Translation of the relics of Martyrs Prince Michael and his counselor Theodore, of Chernigov (1578)
- Repose of Archimandrite Barsanuphius of Valaam and Morocco (1952)
- Repose of Righteous Barbara (Arkhangelskaya) the Recluse, of Ufa (1966)
- Repose of Venerable Elder Ephraim of Katounakia (1998) (Note: On October 20, 2019, at the Protaton Church in Karyes on Mt. Athos, Ecumenical Patriarch Bartholomew announced that the glorification of four great 20th-century Athonite elders would soon proceed, including: Daniel of Katounakia (†1929); Ieronymos of Simonopetra (†1957); Joseph the Hesychast (†1959), and; Ephraim of Katounakia (†1998).; He was officially glorified by the Holy Synod of the Ecumenical Patriarchate on March 9, 2020, to be commemorated each year either on: 1) the Saturday of the Ascetic Saints, which is a moveable feast on the last Saturday before Great Lent, or 2) on February 27th; ("ἡμέρα τῆς ἐτησίας ἱερᾶς μνήμης αὐτοῦ ἡ 27η μηνός Φεβρουαρίου").) (see also: February 27)

== Icon gallery ==
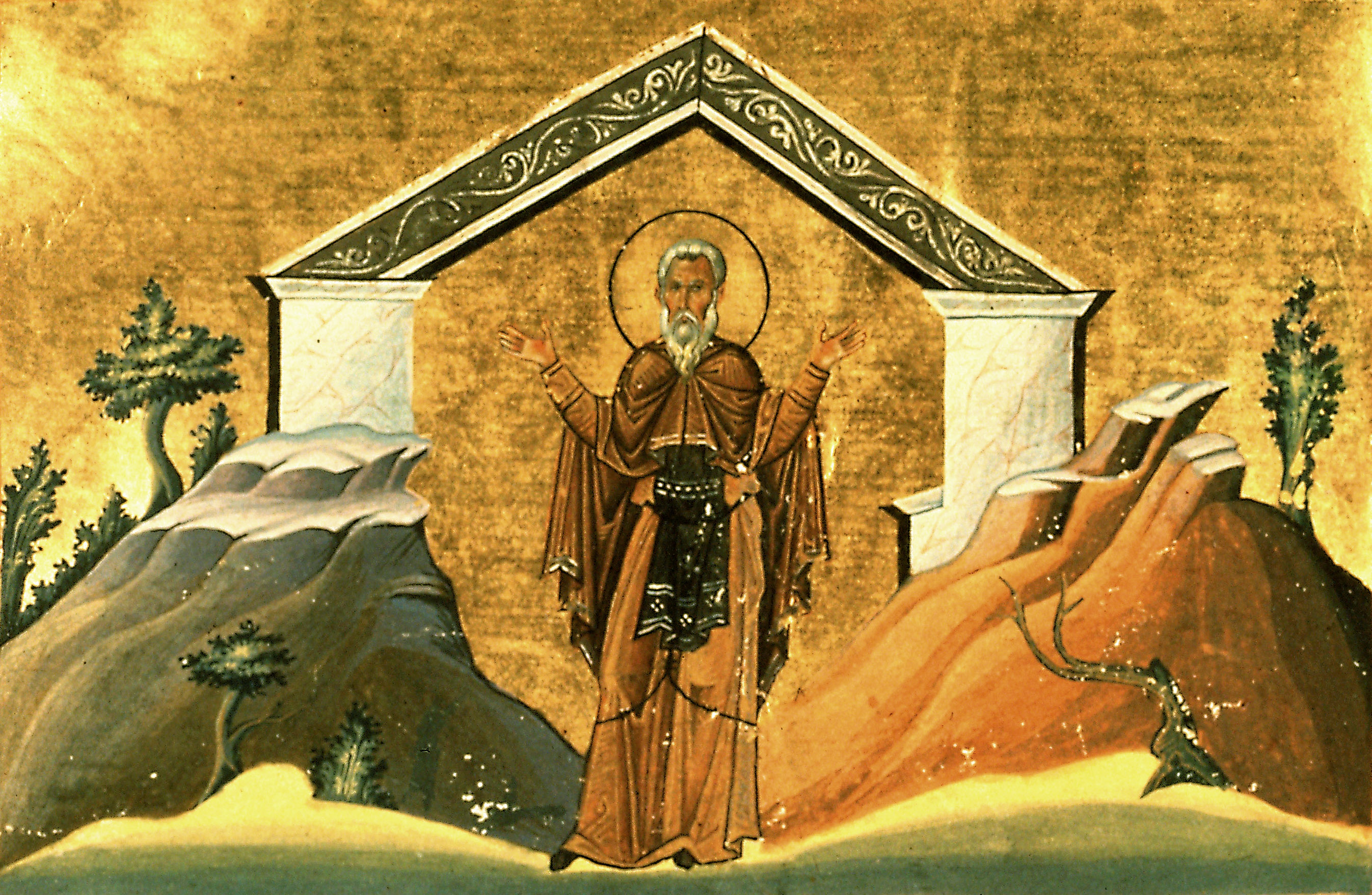
Venerable Auxentius of Bithynia.

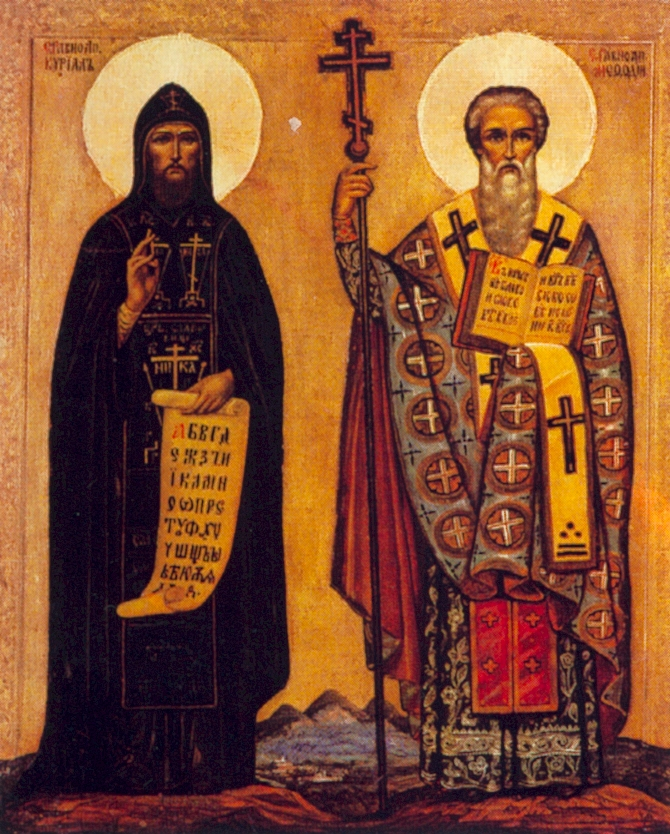
Saints Saints Cyril and Methodius, Equals-to-the-Apostles.

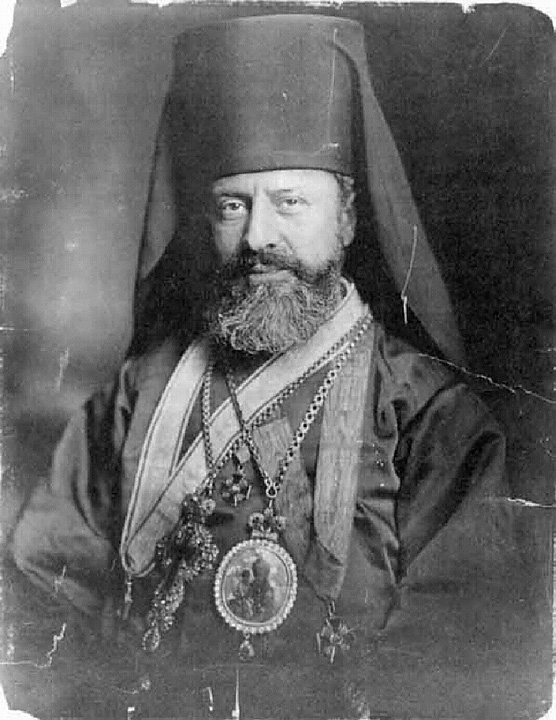
Saint Raphael of Brooklyn.

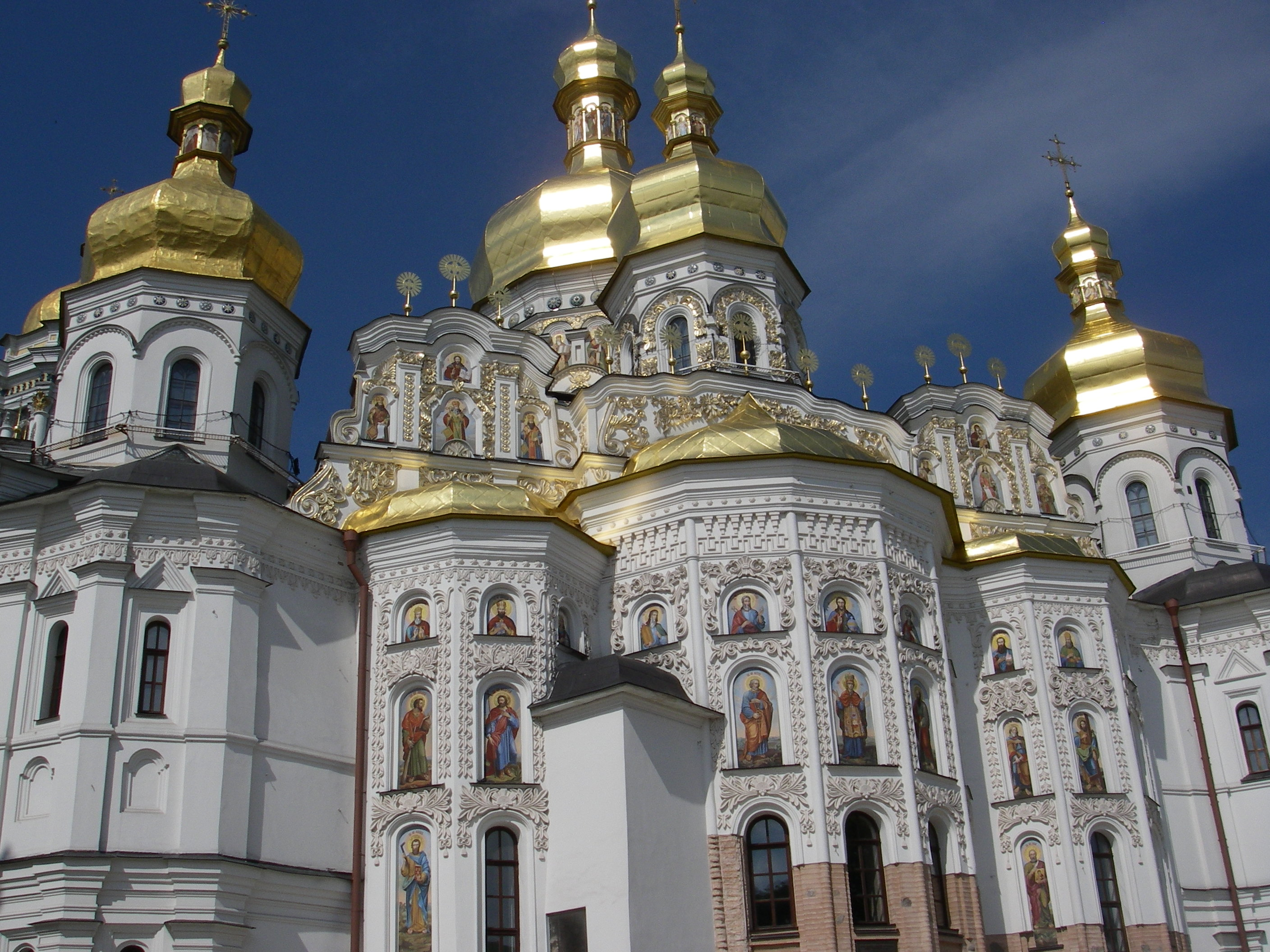
Dormition Cathedral in the Kiev Caves Lavra.

== Sources ==
- February 14 / 27. Orthodox Calendar (Pravoslavie.ru).
- February 27 / 14. Holy Trinity Russian Orthodox Church (A parish of the Patriarchate of Moscow).
- February 14. OCA - The Lives of the Saints.
- The Autonomous Orthodox Metropolia of Western Europe and the Americas. St. Hilarion Calendar of Saints for the year of our Lord 2004. St. Hilarion Press (Austin, TX). p. 15.
- The Fourteenth Day of the Month of February. Orthodoxy in China.
- February 14. Latin Saints of the Orthodox Patriarchate of Rome.
- The Roman Martyrology. Transl. by the Archbishop of Baltimore. Last Edition, According to the Copy Printed at Rome in 1914. Revised Edition, with the Imprimatur of His Eminence Cardinal Gibbons. Baltimore: John Murphy Company, 1916. pp. 47–48.
- Rev. Richard Stanton. A Menology of England and Wales, or, Brief Memorials of the Ancient British and English Saints Arranged According to the Calendar, Together with the Martyrs of the 16th and 17th Centuries. London: Burns & Oates, 1892. pp. 68–69.

Greek Sources

- Great Synaxaristes: (in Greek) 14 Φεβρουαρίου. Μεγασ Συναξαριστησ.
- (in Greek) Συναξαριστής. 14 Φεβρουαρίου. Ecclesia.gr. (H Εκκλησια Τησ Ελλαδοσ).

Russian Sources

- (in Russian) 27 февраля (14 февраля). Православная Энциклопедия под редакцией Патриарха Московского и всея Руси Кирилла (электронная версия). (Orthodox Encyclopedia - Pravenc.ru).
