= February 26 (Eastern Orthodox liturgics) =

Day in the Eastern Orthodox liturgical calendar

Eastern Orthodox liturgical calendar
February 25	February 26	February 27
February 26 O.S. ≍ March 11 (or March 10 (Note: in a leap year)) N.S. February 26 N.S ≍ February 13 O.S.

An Eastern Orthodox cross

February 26 in Eastern Orthodox liturgical calendars is a feast day and a day of commemoration of saints and martyrs. Although some Orthodox churches use the Revised Julian Calendar and others use the traditional Julian calendar, the fixed commemorations for their respective February 26 are broadly the same, no matter which calendar is used. (Note: Despite the dates being the same, the days to which they refer typically differ by 13 days. The notation Old Style or O.S. is sometimes used to indicate a date in the traditional Julian Calendar (the "Old Calendar"). The notation New Style or N.S. indicates a date in the Revised Julian calendar (the "New Calendar").)

== Saints ==
- Martyr Photine (Photina), the Samaritan woman in the Gospel, (Note: Name days celebrated today include: Photini (Φωτεινὴ); Svetlana (Светлана).) and those with her, all martyred under Nero (66): (see also: March 20 - Slavic)

- her sisters: Phota, Photis, Parasceva, and Cyriaca (Kyriake);
- her sons: Victor Stratelates (or Photinus) and Joses (Joseph);
- Christodoulos;
- Sebastian the Duke,
- the officer Anatolius; (Note: Name days celebrated today include: Anatolius, Anatole (Ἀνατολὴς).) and
- Theoclitus, the former sorcerer.

- Saint Porphyrius of Gaza, Bishop of Gaza (420) (Note: "At Gaza, in Palestine, in the time of the emperor Arcadius, St. Porphyry, bishop, who overthrew the idol Marnas and its temple, and after many sufferings, went to rest in the Lord." Name days celebrated today include: Porphyrios (Πορφύριος); Porphyria (Πορφυρία).)
- Saint Nicholas of "Katopinos". (Note: His memory is referenced only in the Synaxarion of Delahaye.)

== Pre-Schism Western saints ==
- Saint Dionysius of Augsburg, venerated as the first Bishop of Augsburg in Germany (c. 303) (Note: By tradition he was baptised and later consecrated bishop by St Narcissus. He was martyred under Diocletian.)
- Saint Faustinian, second Bishop of Bologna in Italy (4th century) (Note: He reorganised his diocese and lived to be a firm defender of Orthodoxy against Arianism.) (Note: "At Bologna, the bishop St. Faustinian, whose preaching strengthened and multiplied the faithful of that Church, which had been much afflicted during the persecution of Diocletian.")
- Saint Andrew of Florence, Bishop of Florence and Confessor (c. 407)
- Saint Agricola, Bishop of Nevers in France (c. 594)
- Saint Victor, a hermit in Arcis-sur-Aube in Champagne in France (7th century)

== Post-Schism Orthodox saints ==
- Venerable Sebastian of Poshekhonye, founder of Sokhotsk Monastery, Yaroslavl (1500) (see also: December 18)
- New Martyr John the Cabinetmaker (John Calphas, "the Apprentice"), by beheading, at Constantinople (1575)

=== New martyrs and confessors ===
- New Hieromartyr Peter Varlamov, Priest of Ufim (1930) (Note: See: Варламов, Пётр Яковлевич. Википедии. (Russian Wikipedia).)
- New Hieromartyr Sergius Voskresensky, Priest (1933)
- Virgin-martyr Anna Blagoveshchensky (1937)
- New Hieromartyr John (Pashin), Bishop of Rylsk (Rila) (1938) (Note: See: Иоанн (Пашин). Википедии. (Russian Wikipedia).)
- New Hieromartyr John Dunaev, Priest (1938)

== Other commemorations ==
- Synaxis of the Mezhetsk Icon of the Most Holy Theotokos at Kiev (1492)

== Icon gallery ==
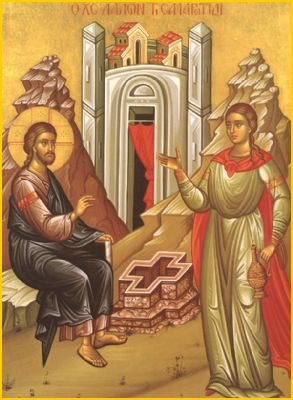
Saint Photine with Christ at Jacob's Well.

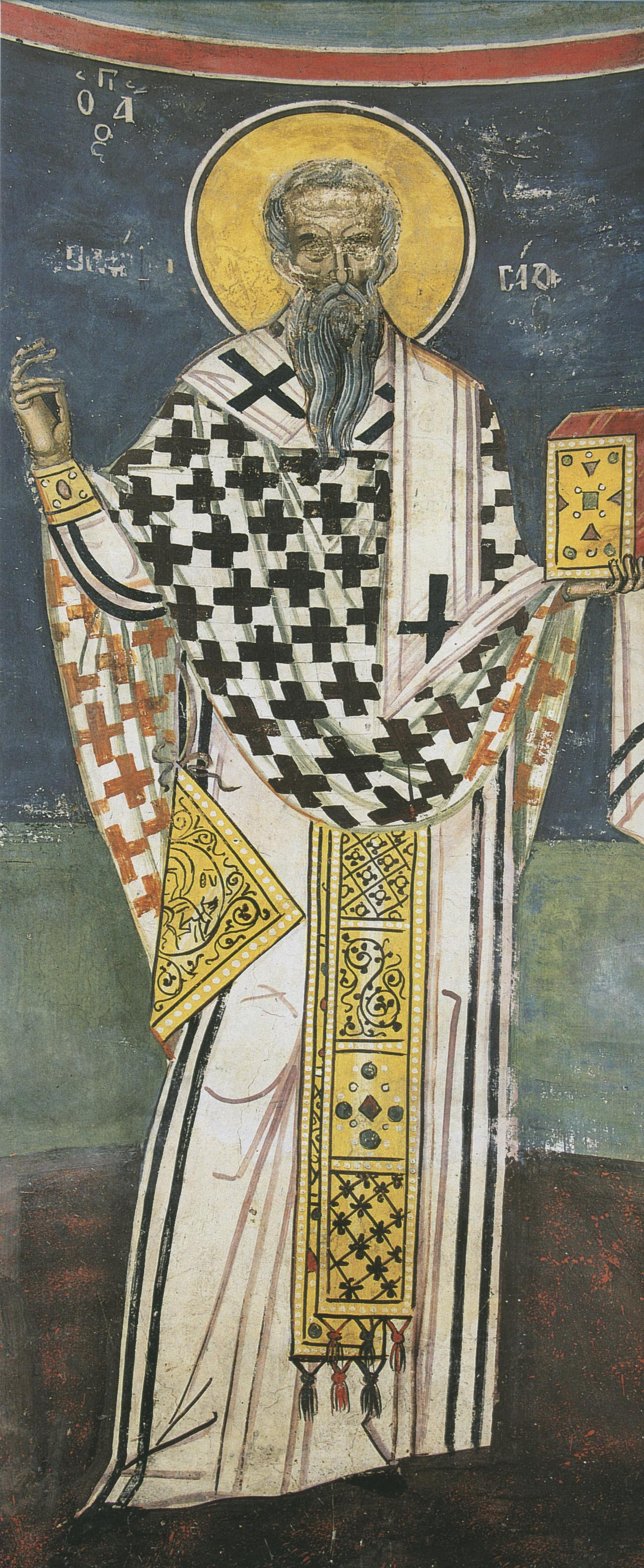
St. Porphyrius of Gaza, Bishop of Gaza.

== Sources ==
- February 26 / March 11. Orthodox Calendar (Pravoslavie.ru).
- March 11 / February 26. Holy Trinity Russian Orthodox Church (A parish of the Patriarchate of Moscow).
- February 26. OCA - The Lives of the Saints.
- The Autonomous Orthodox Metropolia of Western Europe and the Americas. St. Hilarion Calendar of Saints for the year of our Lord 2004. St. Hilarion Press (Austin, TX). pp. 17-18.
- The Twenty-Sixth Day of the Month of February. Orthodoxy in China.
- February 26. Latin Saints of the Orthodox Patriarchate of Rome.
- The Roman Martyrology. Transl. by the Archbishop of Baltimore. Last Edition, According to the Copy Printed at Rome in 1914. Revised Edition, with the Imprimatur of His Eminence Cardinal Gibbons. Baltimore: John Murphy Company, 1916. pp. 17-18.
- Rev. Richard Stanton. A Menology of England and Wales, or, Brief Memorials of the Ancient British and English Saints Arranged According to the Calendar, Together with the Martyrs of the 16th and 17th Centuries. London: Burns & Oates, 1892. p. 86.

Greek Sources

- Great Synaxaristes: (in Greek) 26 Φεβρουαρίου. Μεγασ Συναξαριστησ.
- (in Greek) Συναξαριστής. 26 Φεβρουαρίου. Ecclesia.gr. (H Εκκλησια τησ Ελλαδοσ).

Russian Sources

- (in Russian) 11 марта (26 февраля). Православная Энциклопедия под редакцией Патриарха Московского и всея Руси Кирилла (электронная версия). (Orthodox Encyclopedia - Pravenc.ru).
- (in Russian) 26 февраля (ст.ст.) 11 марта 2014 (нов. ст.). Русская Православная Церковь Отдел внешних церковных связей.
