= March 12 (Eastern Orthodox liturgics) =

Day in the Eastern Orthodox liturgical calendar

Eastern Orthodox liturgical calendar
March 11	March 12	March 13
March 12 O.S. ≍ March 25 N.S. March 12 N.S ≍ February 27 (or February 28 (Note: in a leap year)) O.S.

An Eastern Orthodox cross

March 12 in Eastern Orthodox liturgical calendars is a feast day and a day of commemoration of saints and martyrs. Although some Orthodox churches use the Revised Julian Calendar and others use the traditional Julian calendar, the fixed commemorations for their respective March 12 are broadly the same, no matter which calendar is used. (Note: Despite the dates being the same, the days to which they refer typically differ by 13 days. The notation Old Style or O.S. is sometimes used to indicate a date in the traditional Julian Calendar (the "Old Calendar"). The notation New Style or N.S. indicates a date in the Revised Julian calendar (the "New Calendar").)

== Saints ==
- Righteous Aaron the High Priest, brother of Prophet Moses the God-seer (c. 1530 BC) (Note: He is also commemorated on the Sunday of the Holy Forefathers (two Sundays before the Great Feast of the Nativity of the Lord).)
- Righteous Phineas, grandson of Aaron (ca. 1500 BC) (see also: September 2)
- Holy Nine Martyrs in the Persian Empire. (Note: These are likely the same martyrs as those commemorated on May 16, together with Bishops Abda (Audas) and Abdjesus (Audiesus), Benjamin, and 38 other martyrs at Beth-Kashkar in the Persian Empire, under Ardashir II (375), including: 16 priests, 9 deacons, 6 monks, and 7 unnamed virgins.)
- Saint Cyrus (Abba-Cyr), monk of Alexandria (6th century)
- Saint Gregory the Dialogist, Pope of Rome (604) (Note: "O GOD, who on the soul of thy servant Gregory didst bestow the rewards of everlasting felicity: mercifully grant; that we, which are sore oppressed by the burden of our sins, may by the succour of his intercession be relieved. Through Christ our Lord. Amen.") (Note: "AT Rome, St. Gregory, pope and eminent doctor of the Church, who on account of his illustrious deeds, and the conversion of the English to the faith of Christ, was surnamed the Great, and called the Apostle of England.") (see also: September 3)
- Venerable Theophanes the Confessor of Sigriane (818)
- Venerable Saints Symeon the New Theologian (1022), and his elder, Symeon the Studite (Symeon the Reverent, the Pious), of the Studion (987) (see also: October 12)

== Pre-Schism Western saints ==
- Martyr Mamilian (Maximilian), in Rome.
- Martyr Maximilian of Tebessa, in Thebeste in Numidia, for refusing military service (295)
- Saint Paul Aurelian (Paul de Léon), Bishop of Léon in Brittany, Confessor (572) (Note: A Romano-Briton by origin, he was born in Wales and became a monk with Sts Illtyd, David, Samson and Gildas. He lived for a time on Caldey Island, from where he went to Brittany. He established a monastery at Porz-Pol on the Isle of Ouessant and finally went to Ouismor (now Saint-Pol-de-Léon) where he became bishop.)
- Saint Peter the Deacon, disciple, secretary and companion of St Gregory the Great, and patron-saint of Salussola in Italy (ca. 605)
- Saint Mura McFeredach (Muran, Murames), Abbot of Fahan in County Donegal, patron-saint of Fahan where his cross still stands (ca. 645)
- Saint Alphege (Ælfheah the Elder, Ælfheah the Bald), Bishop of Winchester, England (951) (Note: He became Bishop of Winchester in England in 935. He encouraged many to become monks, notably his relative St Dunstan, whom he ordained priest.)
- Saint Nicodemus of Mammola in Calabria (990)

== Post-Schism Orthodox saints ==
- Venerable Lawrence the Martyr (Lavrentios), one of the "300 Allemagne Saints" in Cyprus (12th century) (Note: The "300 Allemagne Saints" ((in Greek): τριακοσίων Μαρτύρων καὶ Ὁσίων τῆς Κύπρου; or, ἐκ Παλαιστίνης ἐλθόντων εἰς Κύπρον τριακοσίων) came to Cyprus from Palestine, and lived as ascetics in various parts of the island. Included among the "300 Allemagne Saints" are: Venerable Anastasios the Wonderwoker of Cyprus, September 17; Venerable Abbacum the Ascetic of Cyprus, Wonderworker, December 2; Venerable Cassian the Martyr (Kassianos), December 4; Martyr Constantine of Cyprus (Constantine of Allemagne), Wonderworker, July 1; According to some of their lives in the Great Synaxaristes, after the dissolution of the Second Crusade (1147 - 1149), they decided to live the monastic life in the Jordan desert. However since the Latins there disturbed them, they relocated to Cyprus and dispersed over the island.)
- Martyr Demetrius the Devoted, King of Georgia (1289)
- Saint Stephen Dragutin of Serbia (monk Theoctistus Dragutin), (1316)
- Saint Kiril Peychinovich (1845)

=== New martyrs and confessors ===
- Saint Alexander Derzhavin, Priest, Confessor (1933) (Note: See also: (in Russian) Державин, Александр Сергеевич. Википедии. (Russian Wikipedia).)
- New Hieromartyr Vladimir (Volkov), Archimandrite of Islavskoe (Moscow) (1938) (Note: See also: (in Russian) Прмч. Владимир (Волков). Православная Энциклопедия. Russian Orthodox Encyclopedia.)
- New Hieromartyr John Plekhanov, Priest (1938)
- New Hieromartyr Sergius Skvortsov, Priest (1943)

== Other commemorations ==
- Icon of the Most Holy Theotokos "Not-Made-by-Hands" (on the Pillar) at Lydda.
- Repose of Schema-monk Anthony the Gorge-dweller, of Zelenchug Monastery in Kuban (1908)
- Restoration of the Autocephaly of the Georgian Orthodox and Apostolic Church (1917) (Note: Following the overthrow of the Tsar Nicholas II in March 1917, Georgia's Bishops unilaterally restored the autocephaly of the Georgian Orthodox Church. Thus, by the grace of God, on March 12, 1917, the Georgian clergy finally succeeded in restoring the autocephaly of the Church. In the same year they enthroned Kirion II, a leader in the autocephaly movement, as Catholicos-Patriarch of All Georgia. St. Kirion was later martyred at Martqopi Monastery. He was canonized on October 17, 2002, and his feast day is on June 27.)

== Icon gallery ==
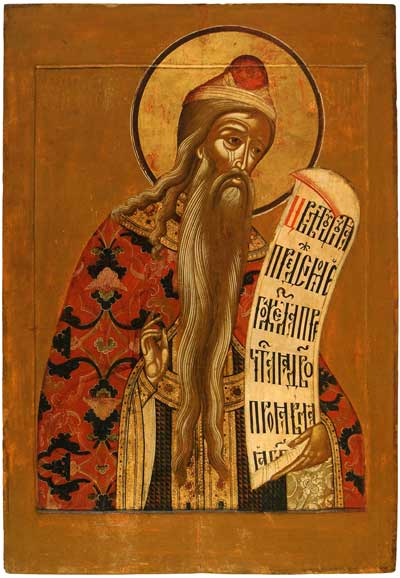
Righteous Aaron the High Priest.

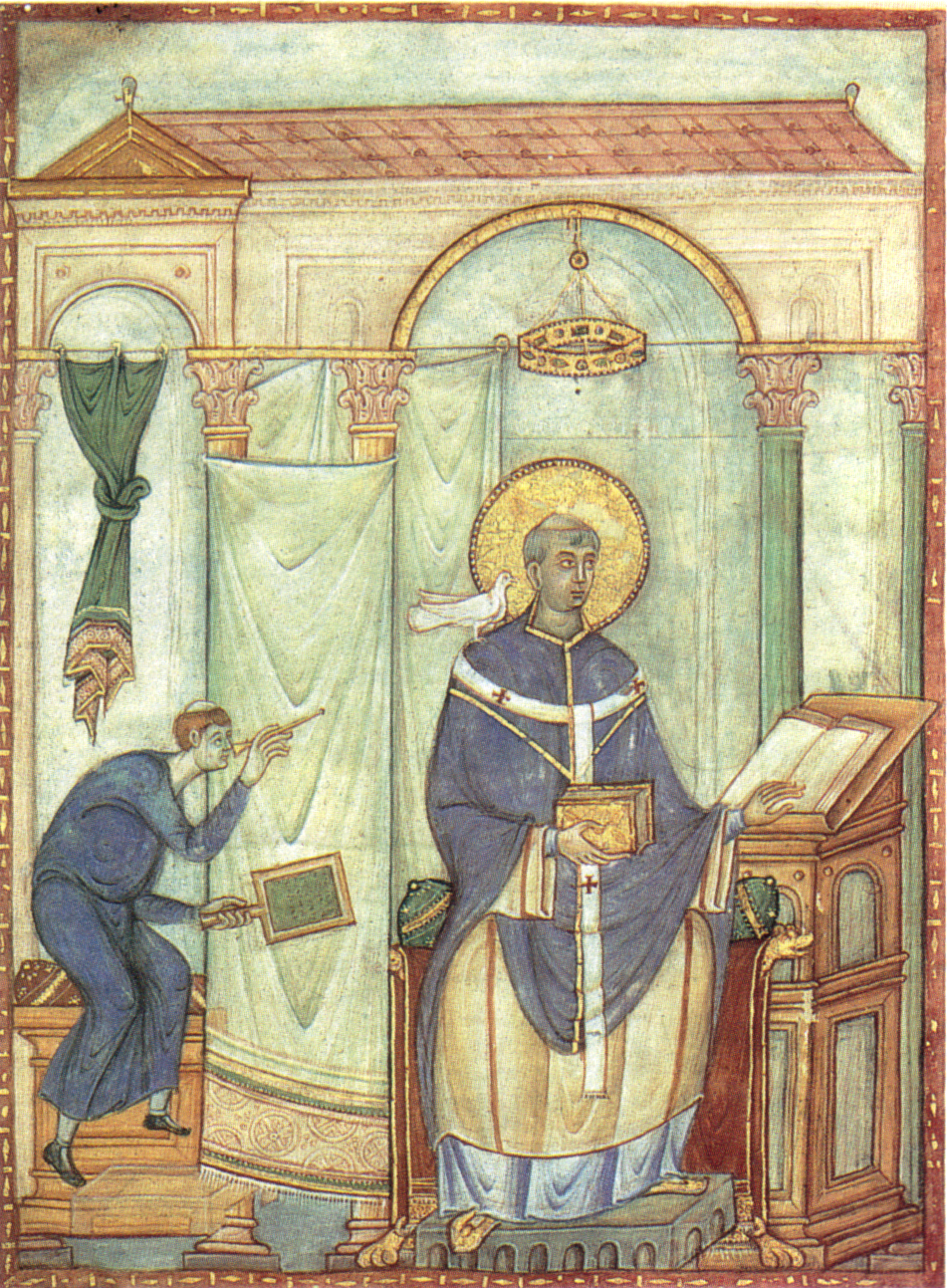
St Gregory the Dialogist, Pope of Rome.

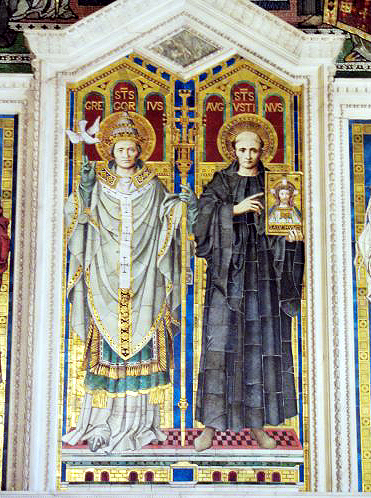
St. Gregory the Dialogist, Pope of Rome, with St. Augustine of Canterbury.

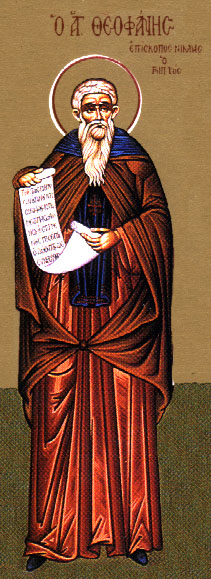
Venerable Theophanes the Confessor of Sigriane.

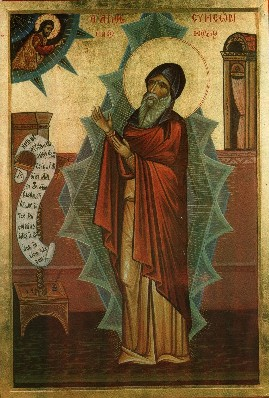
Venerable Saint Symeon the New Theologian.

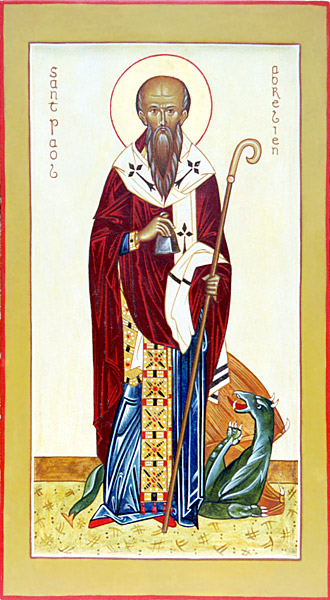
Saint Paul Aurelian (Paul de Léon), Bishop of Léon.

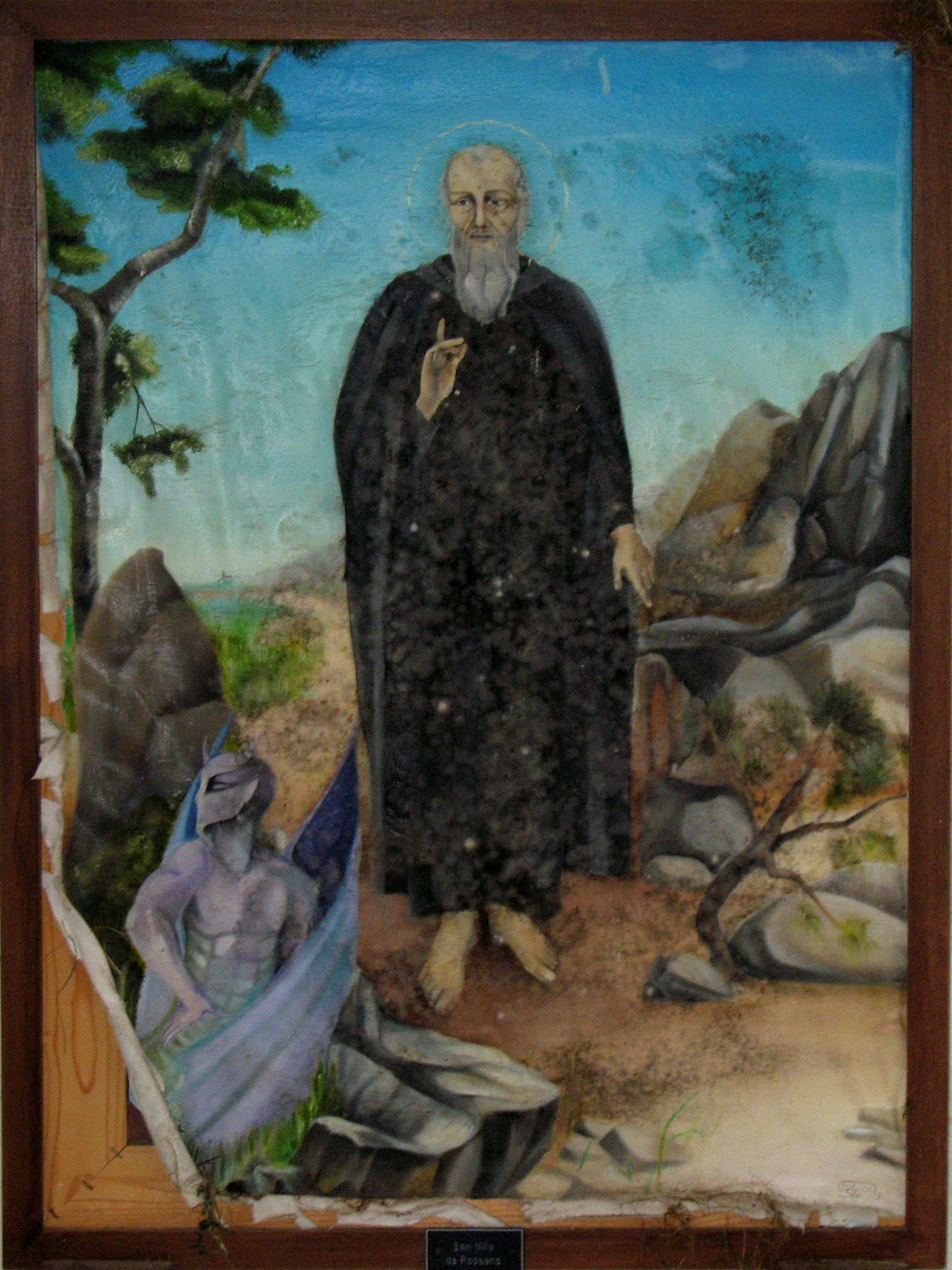
Saint Nicodemus of Mammola, Calabria.

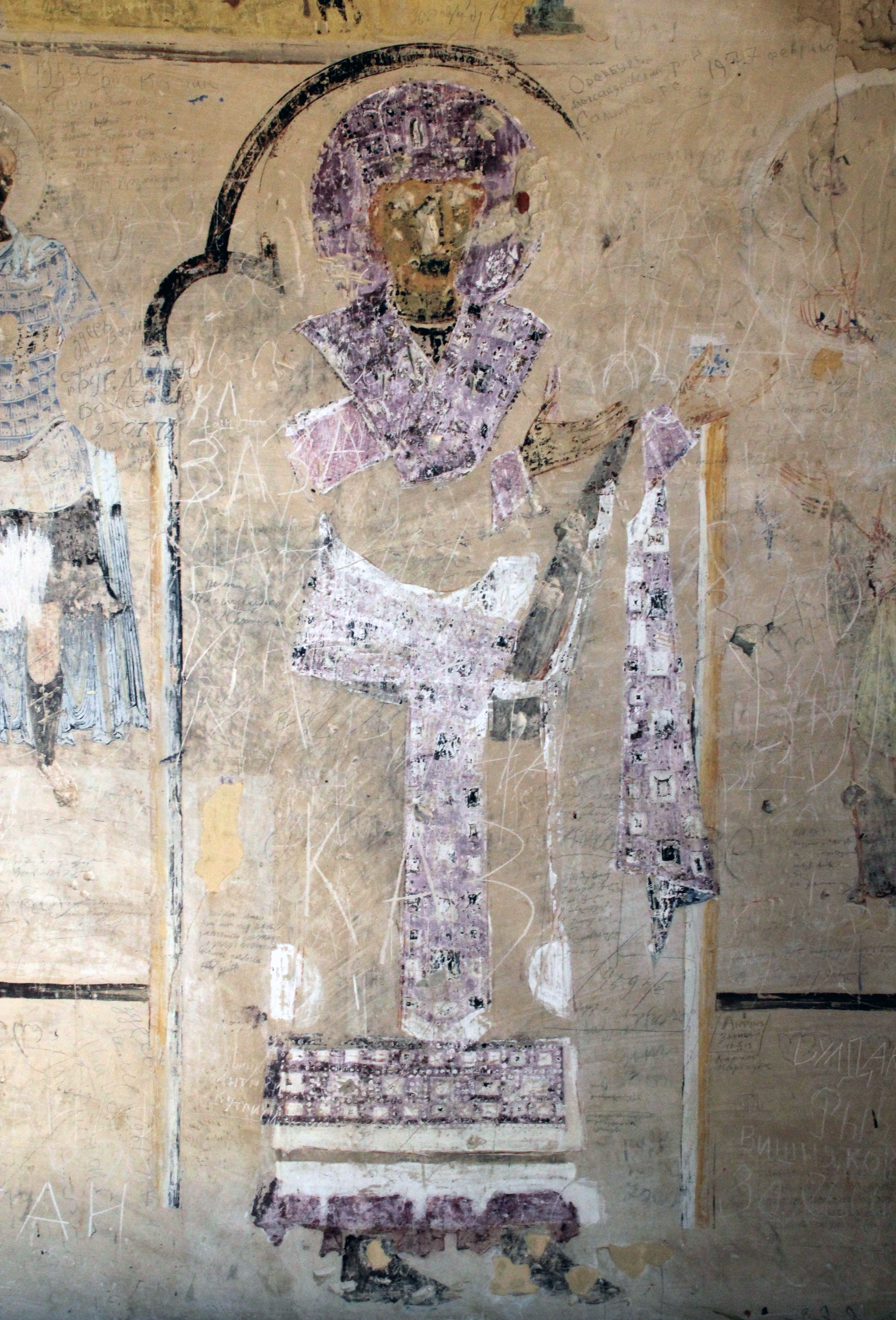
Fresco portrait of Demetrius II of Georgia, c. 1290.

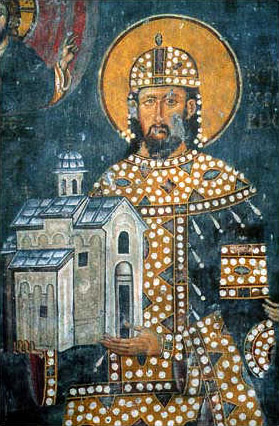
Saint Stephen Dragutin of Serbia (monk Theoctistus Dragutin).

== Sources ==
- March 12/March 25. Orthodox Calendar (PRAVOSLAVIE.RU).
- March 25 / March 12. HOLY TRINITY RUSSIAN ORTHODOX CHURCH (A parish of the Patriarchate of Moscow).
- March 12. OCA - The Lives of the Saints.
- The Autonomous Orthodox Metropolia of Western Europe and the Americas (ROCOR). St. Hilarion Calendar of Saints for the year of our Lord 2004. St. Hilarion Press (Austin, TX). p. 21.
- March 12. Latin Saints of the Orthodox Patriarchate of Rome.
- Rev. Richard Stanton. A Menology of England and Wales, or, Brief Memorials of the Ancient British and English Saints Arranged According to the Calendar, Together with the Martyrs of the 16th and 17th Centuries. London: Burns & Oates, 1892. pp. 112–116.
- The Roman Martyrology. Transl. by the Archbishop of Baltimore. Last Edition, According to the Copy Printed at Rome in 1914. Revised Edition, with the Imprimatur of His Eminence Cardinal Gibbons. Baltimore: John Murphy Company, 1916. pp. 73–74.

Greek Sources

- Great Synaxaristes: (in Greek) 12 ΜΑΡΤΙΟΥ. ΜΕΓΑΣ ΣΥΝΑΞΑΡΙΣΤΗΣ.
- (in Greek) Συναξαριστής. 12 Μαρτίου. ECCLESIA.GR. (H ΕΚΚΛΗΣΙΑ ΤΗΣ ΕΛΛΑΔΟΣ).

Russian Sources

- (in Russian) 25 марта (12 марта). Православная Энциклопедия под редакцией Патриарха Московского и всея Руси Кирилла (электронная версия). (Orthodox Encyclopedia - Pravenc.ru).
- (in Russian) 12 марта (ст.ст.) 25 марта 2013 (нов. ст.). Русская Православная Церковь Отдел внешних церковных связей. (DECR).
