= March 11 (Eastern Orthodox liturgics) =

Day in the Eastern Orthodox liturgical calendar

Eastern Orthodox liturgical calendar
March 10	March 11	March 12
March 11 O.S. ≍ March 24 N.S. March 11 N.S ≍ February 26 (or February 27 (Note: in a leap year)) O.S.

An Eastern Orthodox cross

March 11 in Eastern Orthodox liturgical calendars is a feast day and a day of commemoration of saints and martyrs. Although some Orthodox churches use the Revised Julian Calendar and others use the traditional Julian calendar, the fixed commemorations for their respective March 11 are broadly the same, no matter which calendar is used. (Note: Despite the dates being the same, the days to which they refer typically differ by 13 days. The notation Old Style or O.S. is sometimes used to indicate a date in the traditional Julian Calendar (the "Old Calendar"). The notation New Style or N.S. indicates a date in the Revised Julian calendar (the "New Calendar").)

== Saints ==
- Hieromartyr Pionius, Priest of Smyrna, and those with him (250):

- Asclepiades, Macedonia, Linus (Limnus), and Sabina.

- Hieromartyrs Trophimus and Thalus, Priests, of Laodicea (300) (see also: March 16)
- The Holy Syrian Martyrs (4th century)
- Venerable George, Abbot of Sinai (c. 545), brother of St. John Climacus.
- Venerable John Moschos, the ascetic writer of ‘The Spiritual Meadow’ (622)
- Venerable Sophronius of Jerusalem, Patriarch of Jerusalem (638)
- Saint George the New, Wonderworker of Constantinople (c. 970)

== Pre-Schism Western saints ==
- Martyrs Candidus, Piperion and Companions, 22 martyrs who suffered in North Africa (in Carthage or in Alexandria), under Valerian and Gallienus (c. 254-259)
- Martyrs Heraclius and Zosimus, who suffered in Carthage in North Africa under Valerian and Gallienus (263)
- Martyr Alberta, one of the first victims of the persecution under Diocletian, she suffered in Agen in France with St Faith and others (c. 286)
- Martyr Constantine, a confessor in Carthage in North Africa.
- Hieromartyr Constantine of Cornwall and Govan, in Kintyre, Scotland (576) (Note: "ST. CONSTANTINE, King and Martyr, was a British prince, said to have been King of Cornwall. He resigned his crown, and was ordained priest. Constantine is reported to have arrived in Scotland at the same time as St. Columba, to have founded a monastery at Govan, to have preached to the Scots and Picts, and to have converted the district of Cantyre to the Faith. He ended his course by martyrdom. (It appears to be doubtful whether he was or was not the same Constantine of Cornwall, against whose enormous crimes St. Gildas so loudly inveighs.).") (Note: His feast day is observed on March 9 in the tradition of Cornwall and Wales; and on March 11 in the Scottish and Irish traditions. Two places in Cornwall are still named after him today.) (Note: Troparion of St Constantine, Tone 5: Grieving at the loss of thy young spouse,/ thou didst renounce the world, O Martyr Constantine,/ but seeing thy humility God called thee to leave thy solitude and serve Him as a priest./ Following thy example,/ we pray for grace to see that we must serve God as He wills/ and not as we desire,/ that we may be found worthy of His great mercy. Kontakion of St Constantine, Tone 4: Thou wast born to be King of Cornwall,/ O Martyr Constantine,/ and who could have foreseen that thou wouldst become the first hieromartyr of Scotland./ As we sing thy praises, O Saint,/ we acknowledge the folly of preferring human plans to the will of our God.) (see also: March 9)
- Saint Constantine of Strathclyde, King, Monk, Confessor (640)
- Saint Vigilius, Successor of St Palladius (661) as Bishop of Auxerre in France, murdered in a forest near Compiègne by order of the mayor of the palace (685)
- Saint Vindician, a disciple of St Eligius, became Bishop of Arras-Cambrai in France and bravely protested against the excesses of the Merovingian Kings (712)
- Saint Benedict Crispus of Milan, Archbishop of Milan in Italy for forty-five years (725)
- Saint Óengus the Culdee (Óengus of Tallaght, Angus), Bishop, of Clonenagh, Ireland (824) (Note: Known as 'the Culdee'. A monk at Clonenagh in Ireland and then at Tallacht, he is remembered for his celebrated hymn to the saints, called Felire. From Tallacht he returned to Clonenagh where he became a bishop.)
- Hieromartyr Eulogius of Córdoba, Metropolitan of Cordoba, who suffered martyrdom for protecting St Leocritia, a young girl converted from Islam (859) (Note: A prominent priest in Cordoba in Spain when the Moorish persecution was at its height. Outstanding for his courage and learning, he encouraged the Orthodox in their sufferings and wrote The Memorial of the Saints for their benefit.)
- Saint Firmian (Fermanus, Firminus), Abbot of San Sabino Piceno near Fermo in Italy (c. 1020)
- Saint Peter the Spaniard, a pilgrim from Spain to Rome who settled as a hermit in Babuco near Veroli, confessor, renowned for miracles.

== Post-Schism Orthodox saints ==
- Venerable Theodora of Arta, Queen of Arta, wife of Despot Michael II of Epirus (c. 1275)
- Saint Sophronius, recluse of the Kiev Caves (13th century)
- Saint Euthymius II of Novgorod, Archbishop of Novgorod, Wonderworker (1458)
- Saint Sophronius of Vratsa, Bishop of Vratsa, Bulgaria (1813) (Note: The synodal act of his glorification by the Church of Bulgaria took place on December 31, 1964.)
- Venerable Alexis of Goloseyevsky Skete, Kiev Caves (1917) (Note: See: (in Russian) Алексий (Шепелев). Википедии. (Russian Wikipedia).)

=== New martyrs and confessors ===
- New Hiero-confessor Patrick (Petrov), hieromonk of Valaam Monastery (1933)
- New Hieromartyr Basil Malahov, Priest (1937)
- New Hiero-confessor Michael (Galushko), Schema-archimandrite, of Svyatogorsk Monastery (1961) (Note: See: (in Russian) Михаил (Галушко). Википедии. (Russian Wikipedia).)

== Other commemorations ==
- Translation to Constantinople of the relics of Martyr Epimachus of Pelusium, from Alexandria (250)
- Slaying of Emperor Paul I of Russia (1801)

== Icon gallery ==
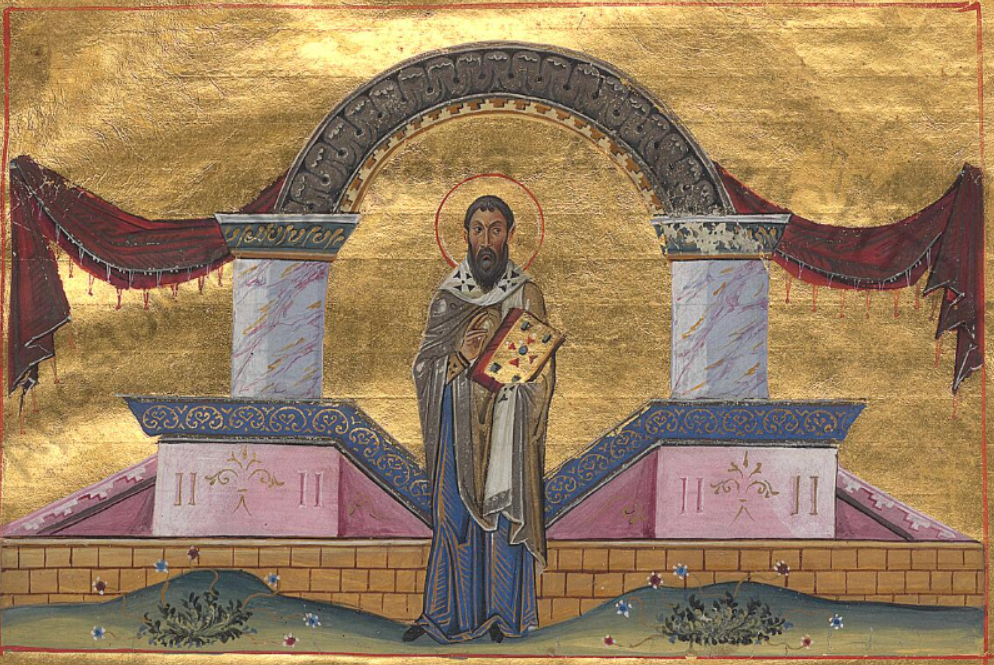
Saint Sophronius of Jerusalem, Patriarch of Jerusalem.

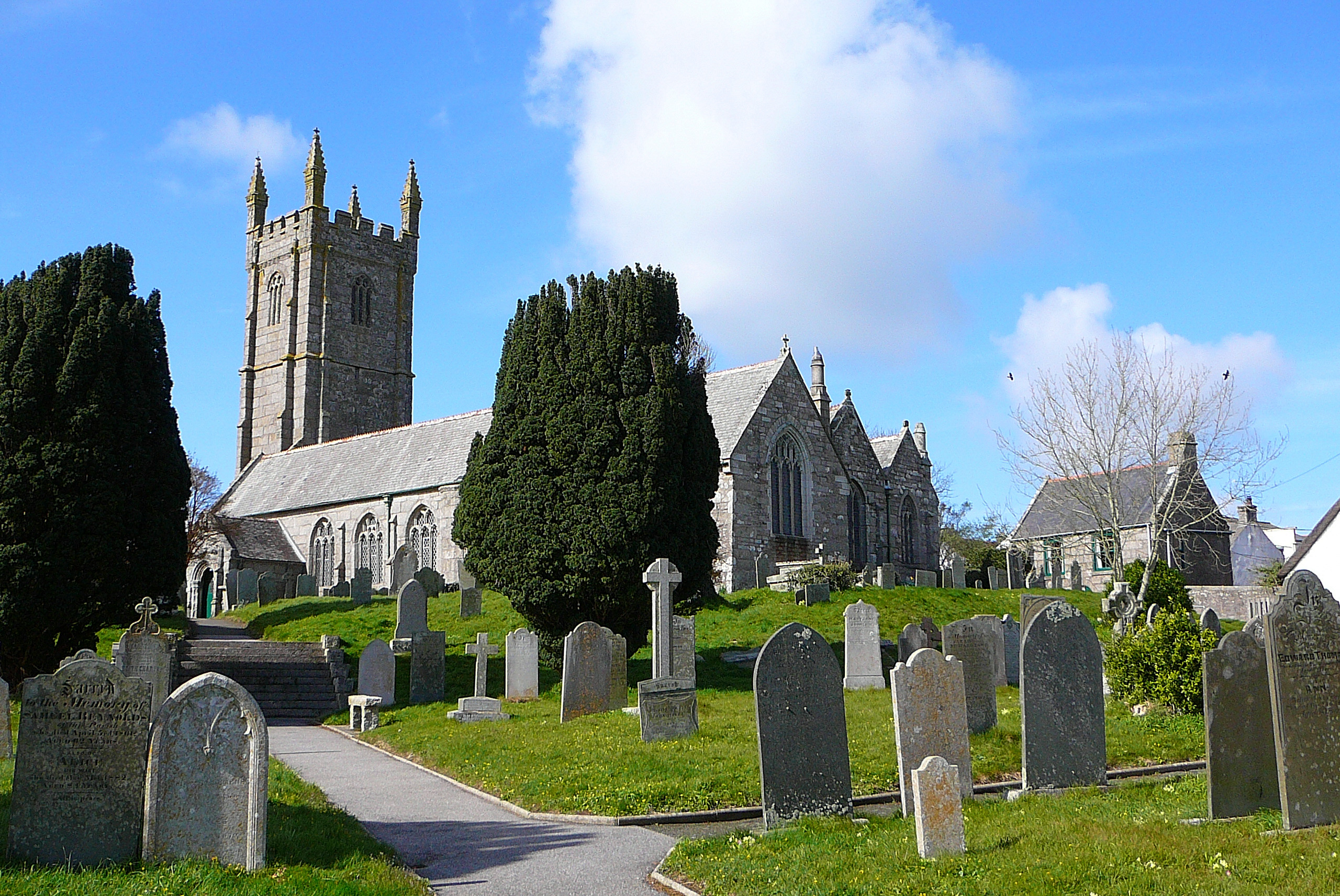
Churchyard of Saint Constantine, Cornwall.

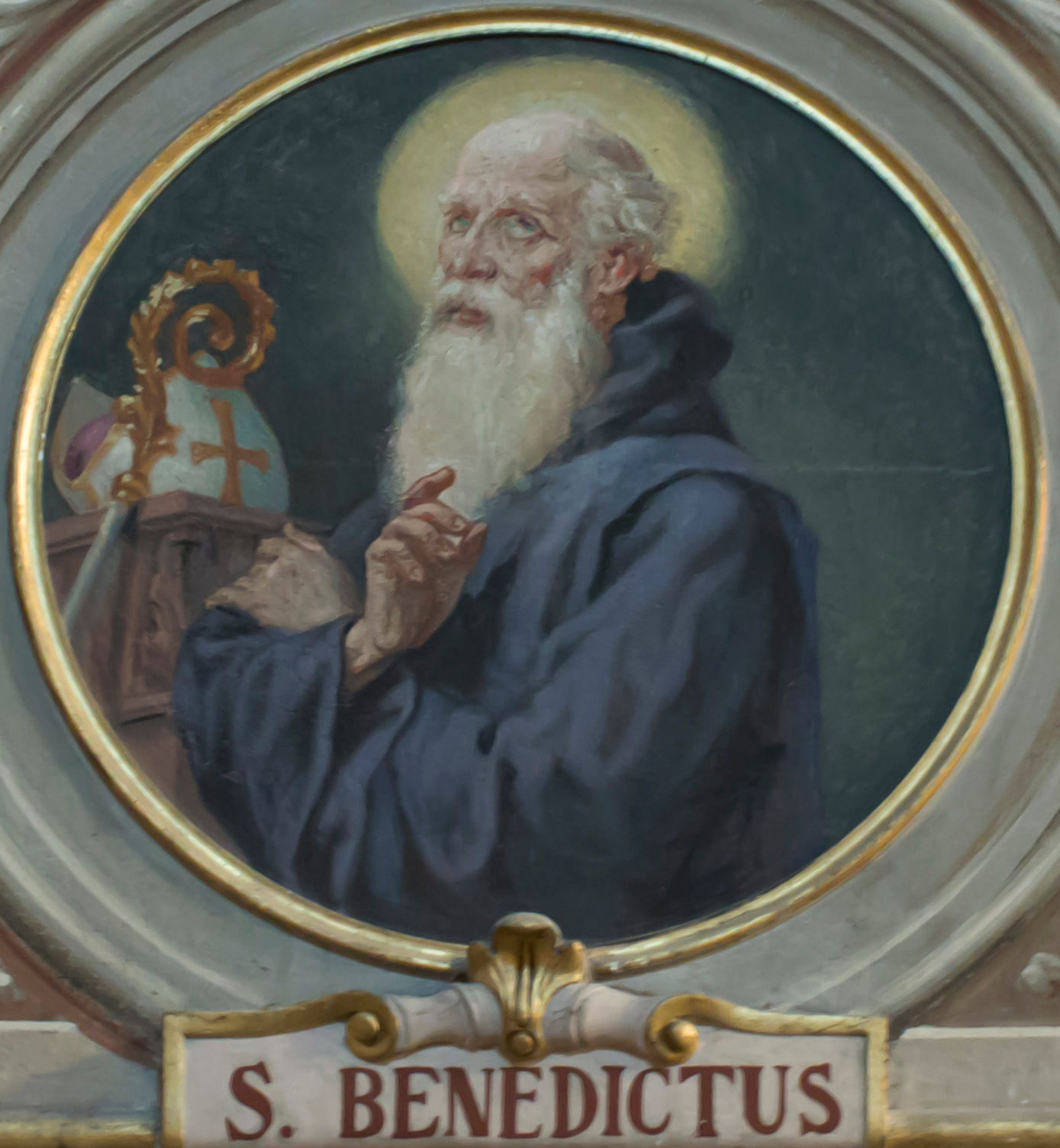
St. Benedict Crispus of Milan, Archbishop of Milan.

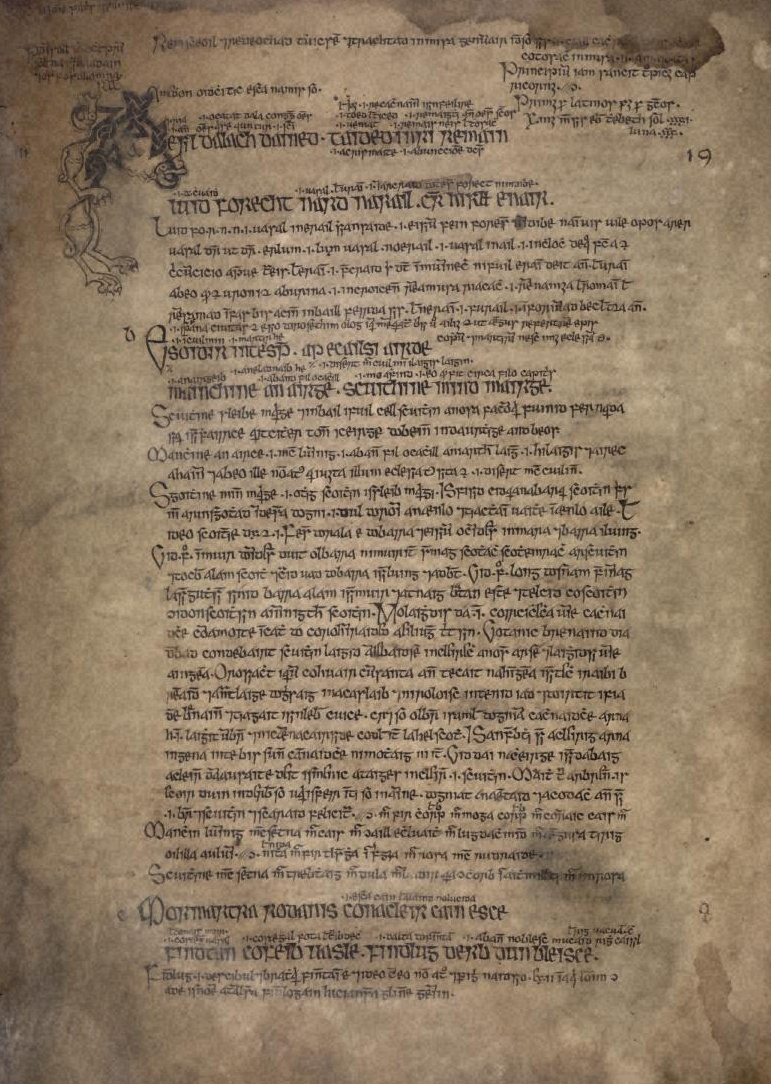
Excerpt from the Martyrology of Oengus.

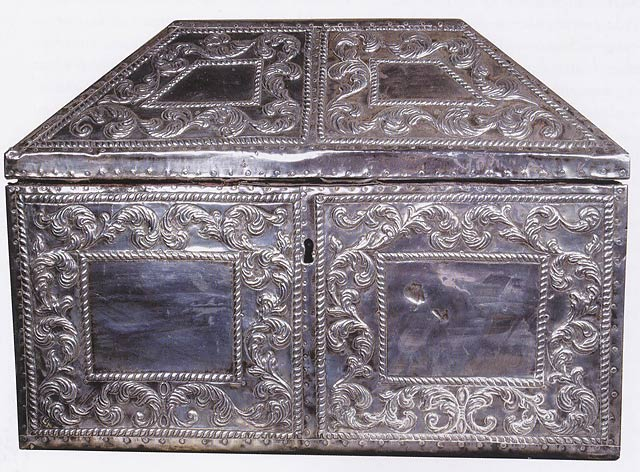
A silver reliquary containing the remains of Saints Eulogius and Leocritia of Cordoba, in Camara Santa, Oviedo Cathedral, Oviedo, Spain.

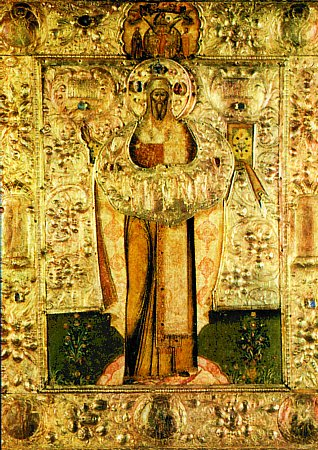
Euthymius II of Novgorod.

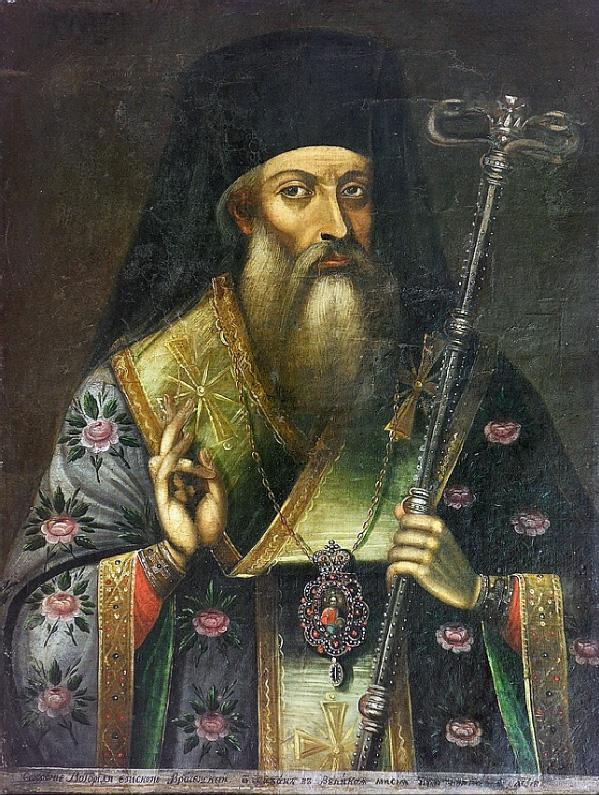
Sophronius of Vratsa.

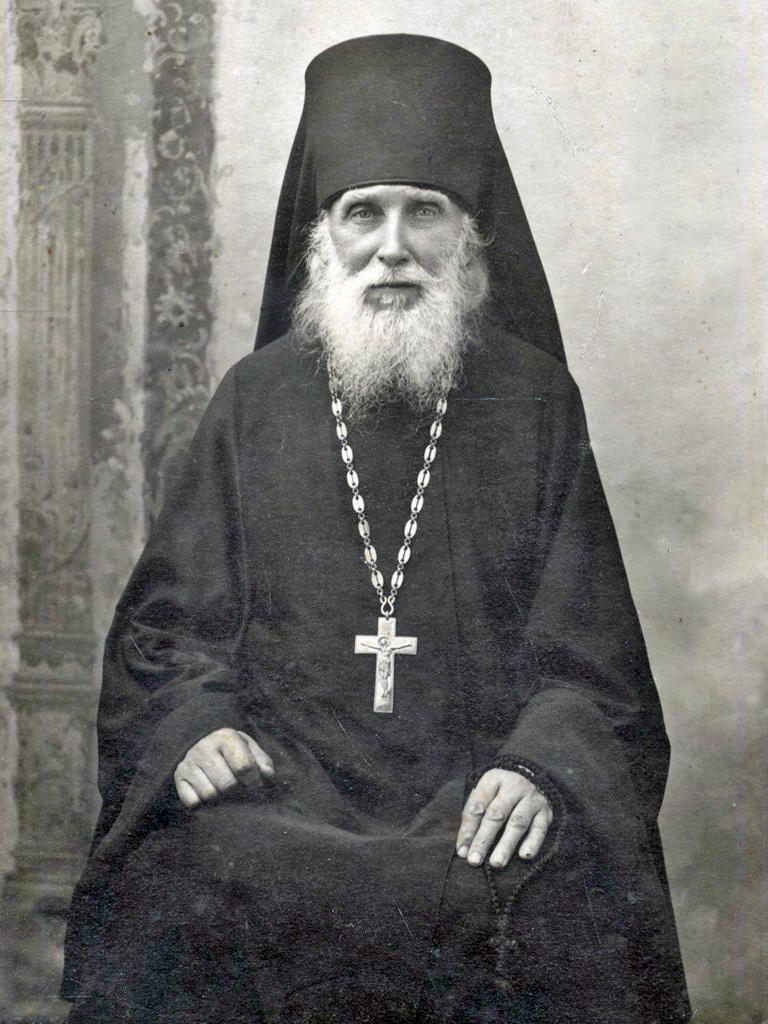
Venerable Alexis of Goloseyevsky Skete, Kiev Caves.

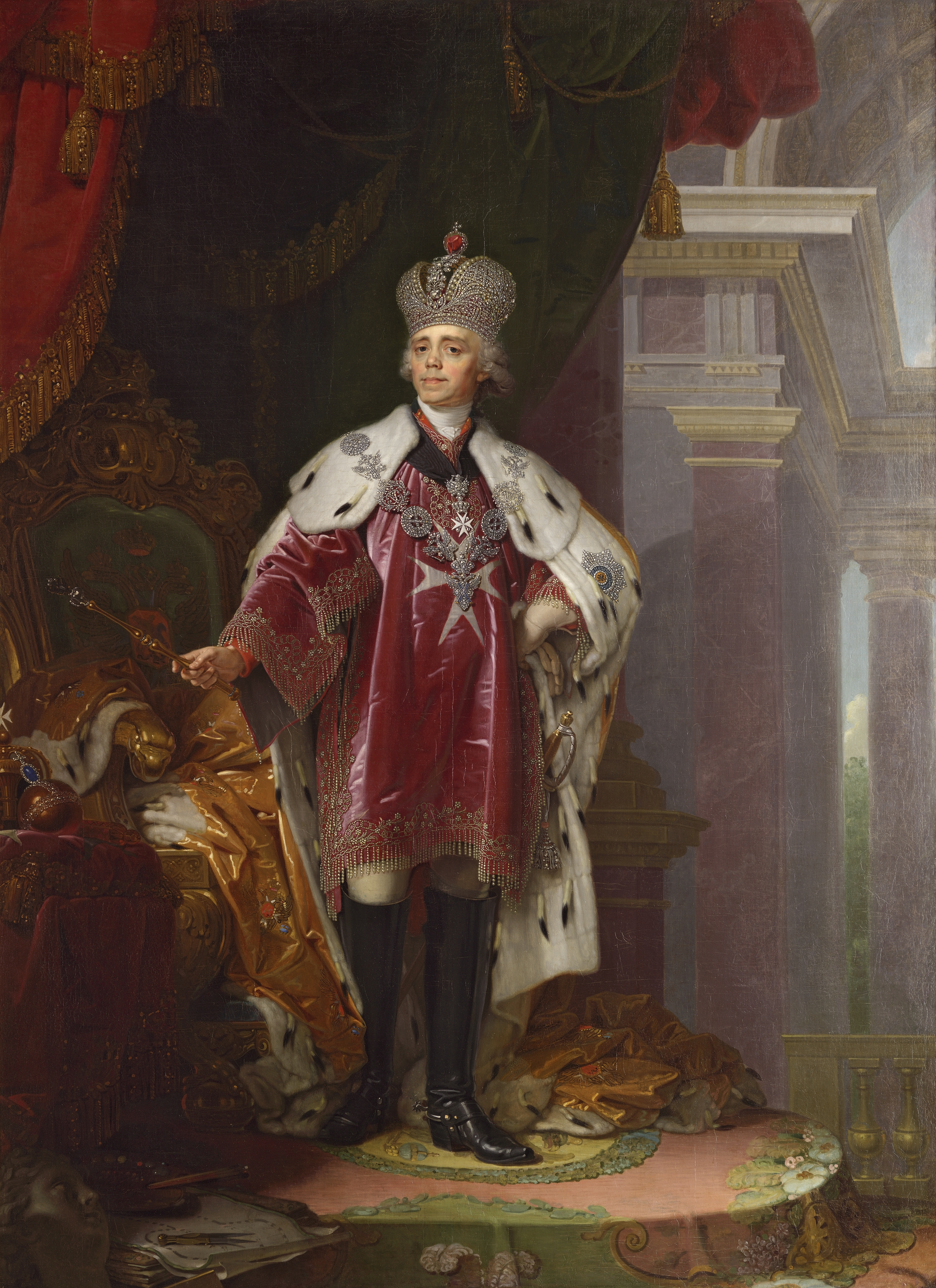
Portrait of Paul I of Russia (1754-1801).

== Sources ==
- March 11/March 24. Orthodox Calendar (PRAVOSLAVIE.RU).
- March 24 / March 11. HOLY TRINITY RUSSIAN ORTHODOX CHURCH (A parish of the Patriarchate of Moscow).
- March 11. OCA - The Lives of the Saints.
- The Autonomous Orthodox Metropolia of Western Europe and the Americas (ROCOR). St. Hilarion Calendar of Saints for the year of our Lord 2004. St. Hilarion Press (Austin, TX). p. 21.
- March 11. Latin Saints of the Orthodox Patriarchate of Rome.
- Rev. Richard Stanton. A Menology of England and Wales, or, Brief Memorials of the Ancient British and English Saints Arranged According to the Calendar, Together with the Martyrs of the 16th and 17th Centuries. London: Burns & Oates, 1892. pp. 110-111.
- The Roman Martyrology. Transl. by the Archbishop of Baltimore. Last Edition, According to the Copy Printed at Rome in 1914. Revised Edition, with the Imprimatur of His Eminence Cardinal Gibbons. Baltimore: John Murphy Company, 1916. pp. 72–73.

Greek Sources

- Great Synaxaristes: (in Greek) 11 ΜΑΡΤΙΟΥ. ΜΕΓΑΣ ΣΥΝΑΞΑΡΙΣΤΗΣ.
- (in Greek) Συναξαριστής. 11 Μαρτίου. ECCLESIA.GR. (H ΕΚΚΛΗΣΙΑ ΤΗΣ ΕΛΛΑΔΟΣ).

Russian Sources

- (in Russian) 24 марта (11 марта). Православная Энциклопедия под редакцией Патриарха Московского и всея Руси Кирилла (электронная версия). (Orthodox Encyclopedia - Pravenc.ru).
- (in Russian) 11 марта (ст.ст.) 24 марта 2013 (нов. ст.). Русская Православная Церковь Отдел внешних церковных связей. (DECR).
