= Vissenaken =

Village in Belgium

Coordinates: 50°50′N 4°55′E

Vissenaken is a village in Belgium. It is part (deelgemeente) of the municipality Tienen.

It is located north of the city of Tienen and is divided into two parishes: Sint-Maartens and Sint-Pieters.

The saint Himelin is known only in Vissenaken.

== Origin of the name ==
Old Latin and Dutch names: 1147 Fennache, 1214 vissnake, 1217 de Fenaco, 1226 Vesnaken. Vissenaken can be reconstituted as *Fassiniacas: this is the German name Fasso + the adjective iniacas. Vissenaken thus means: with the people of Fasso.

== Pictures ==
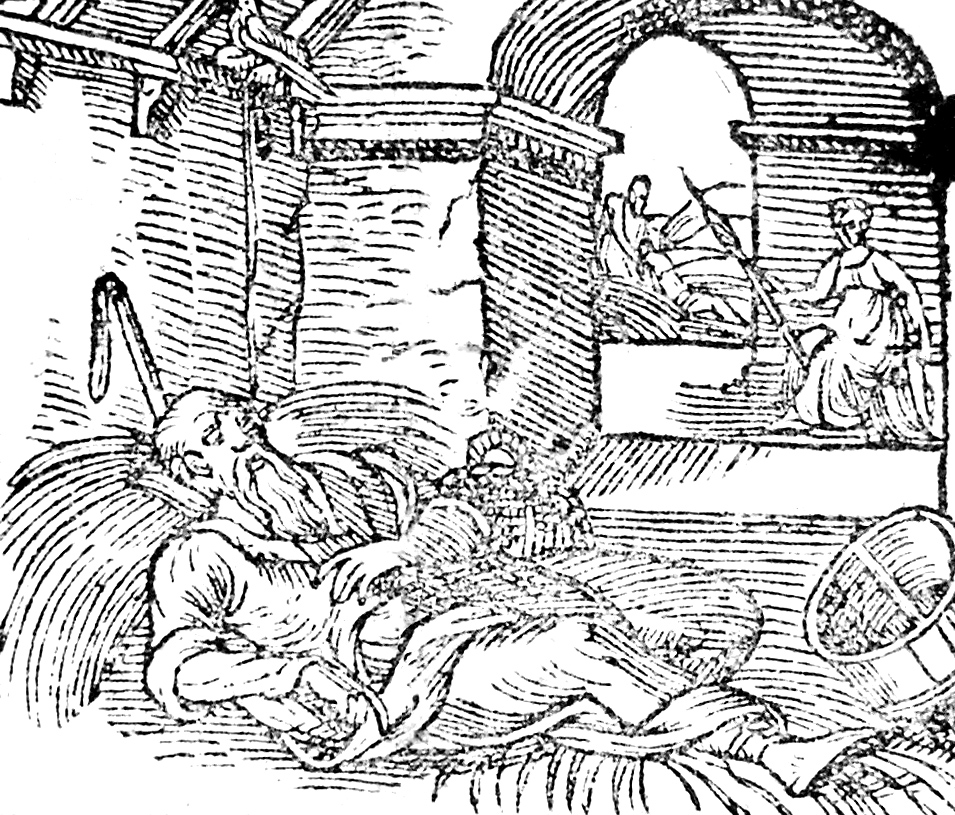
Saint Himelinus

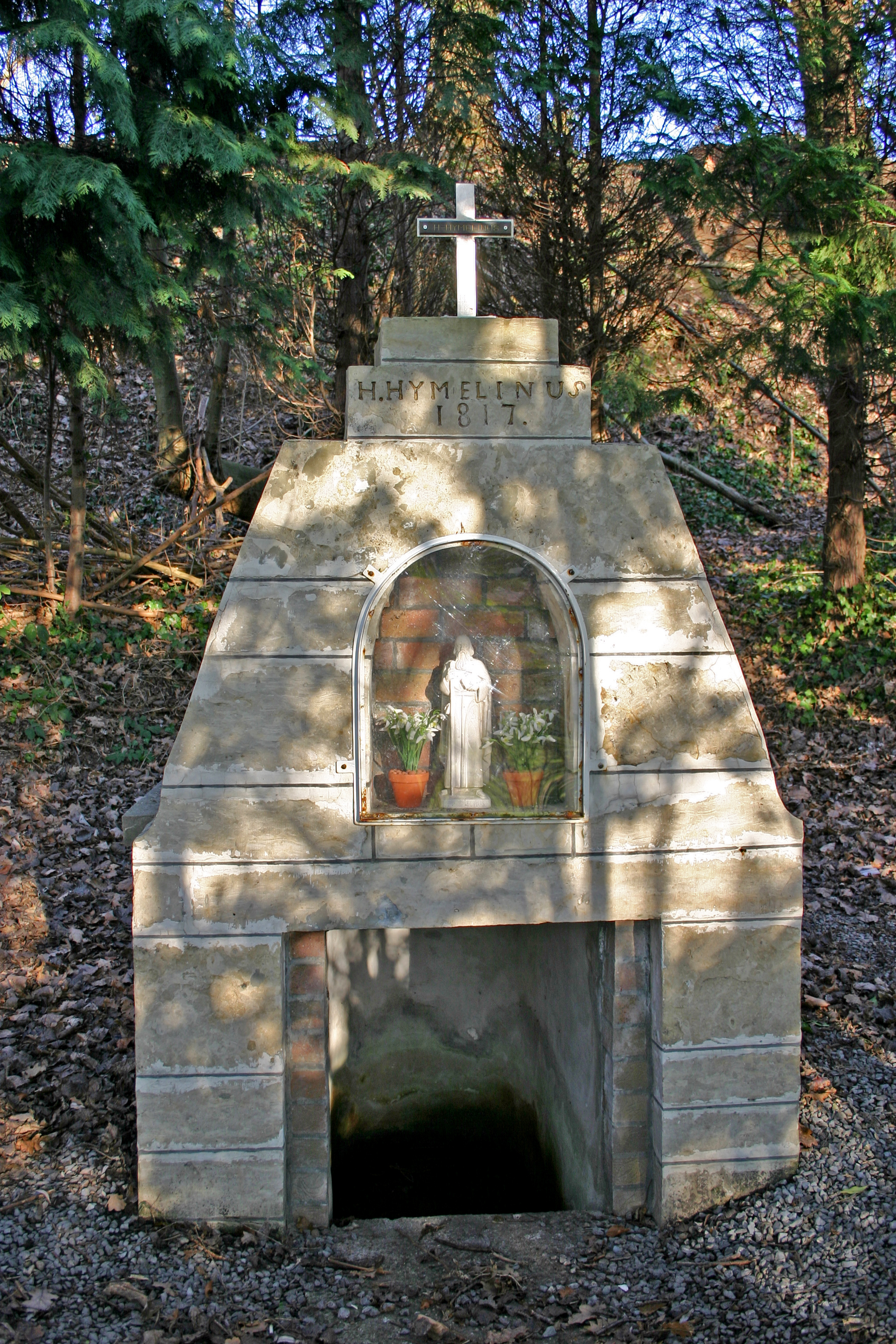
The well of Saint Himelinus

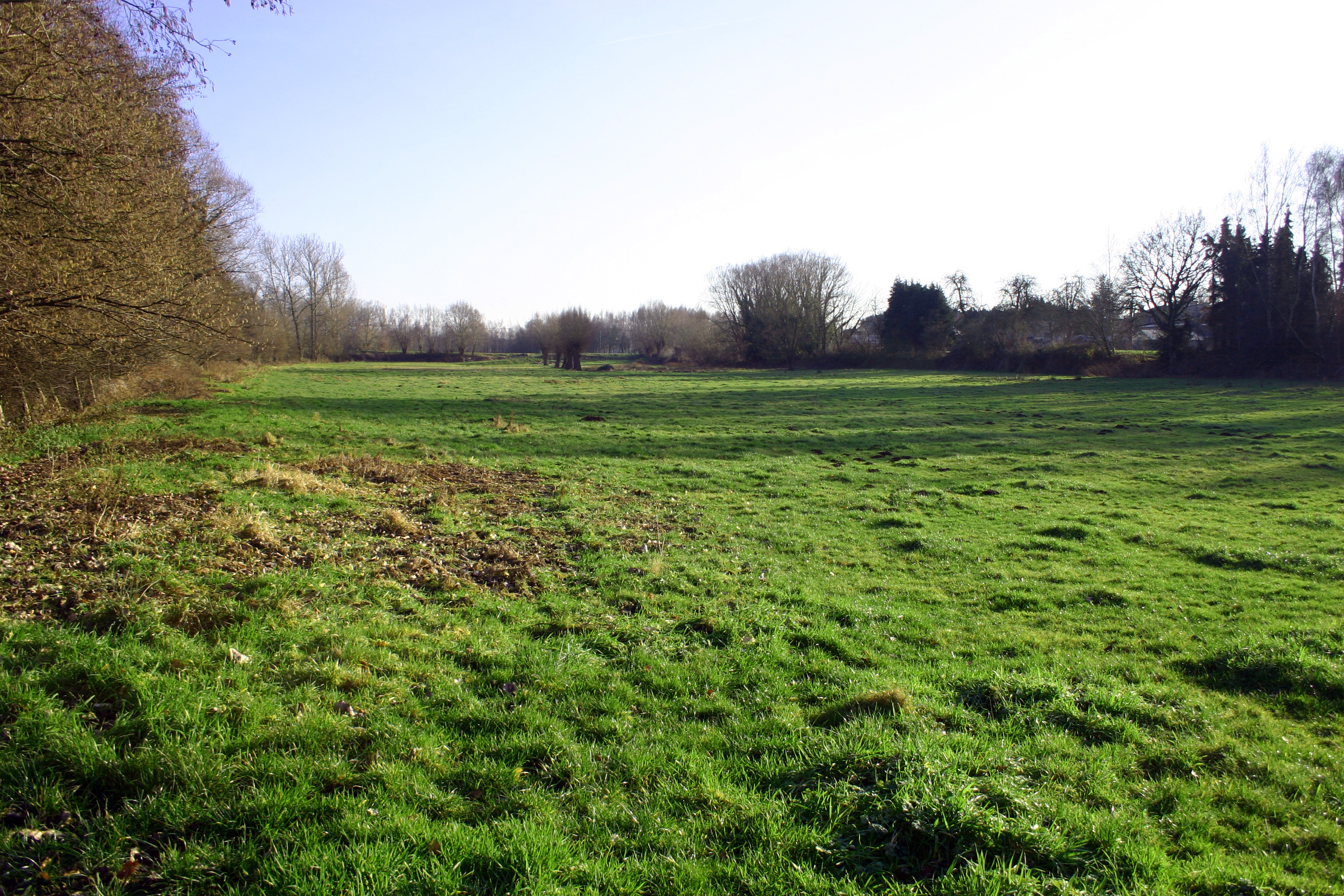
Part of the Rozendaal valley
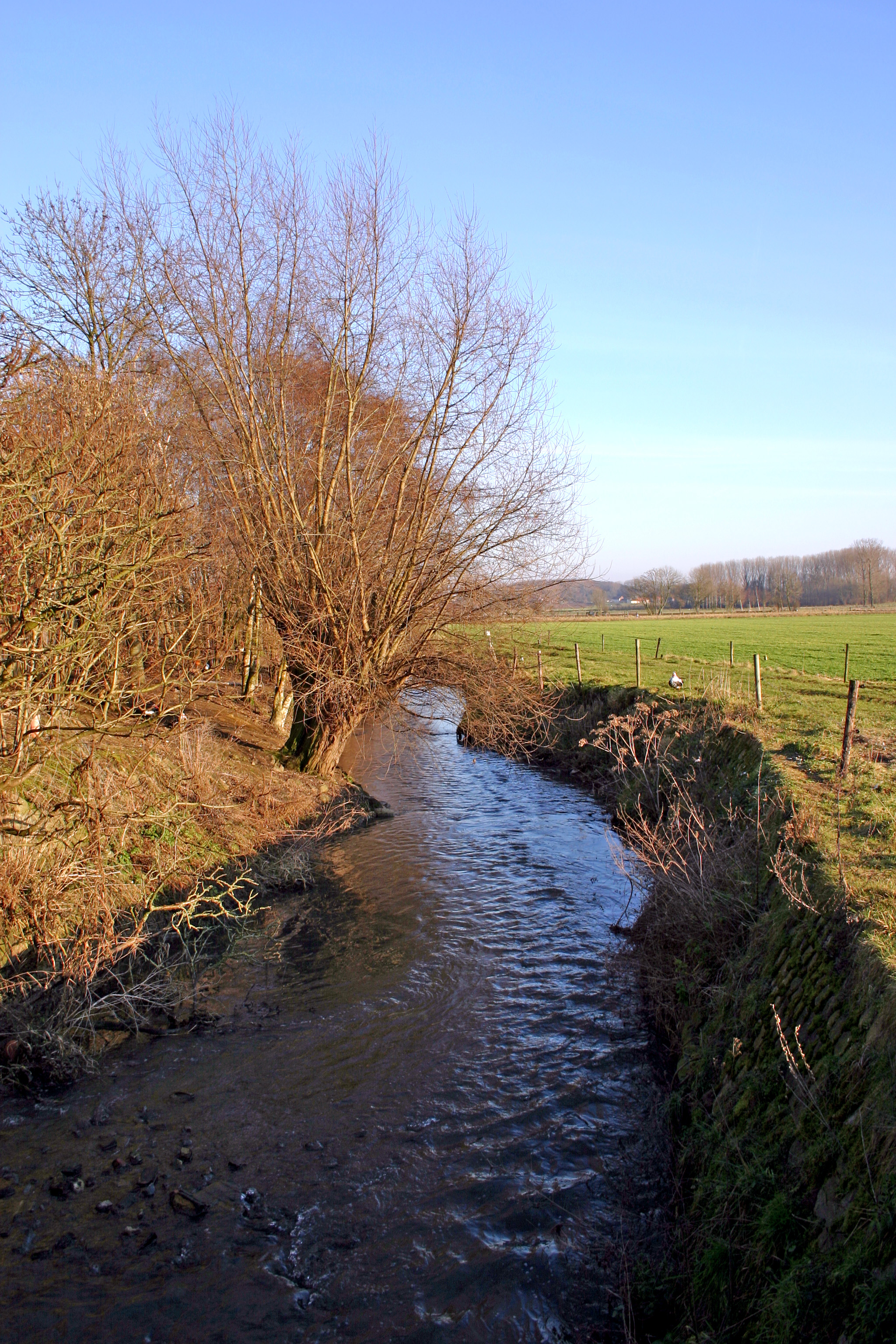
The river Velp in Vissenaken

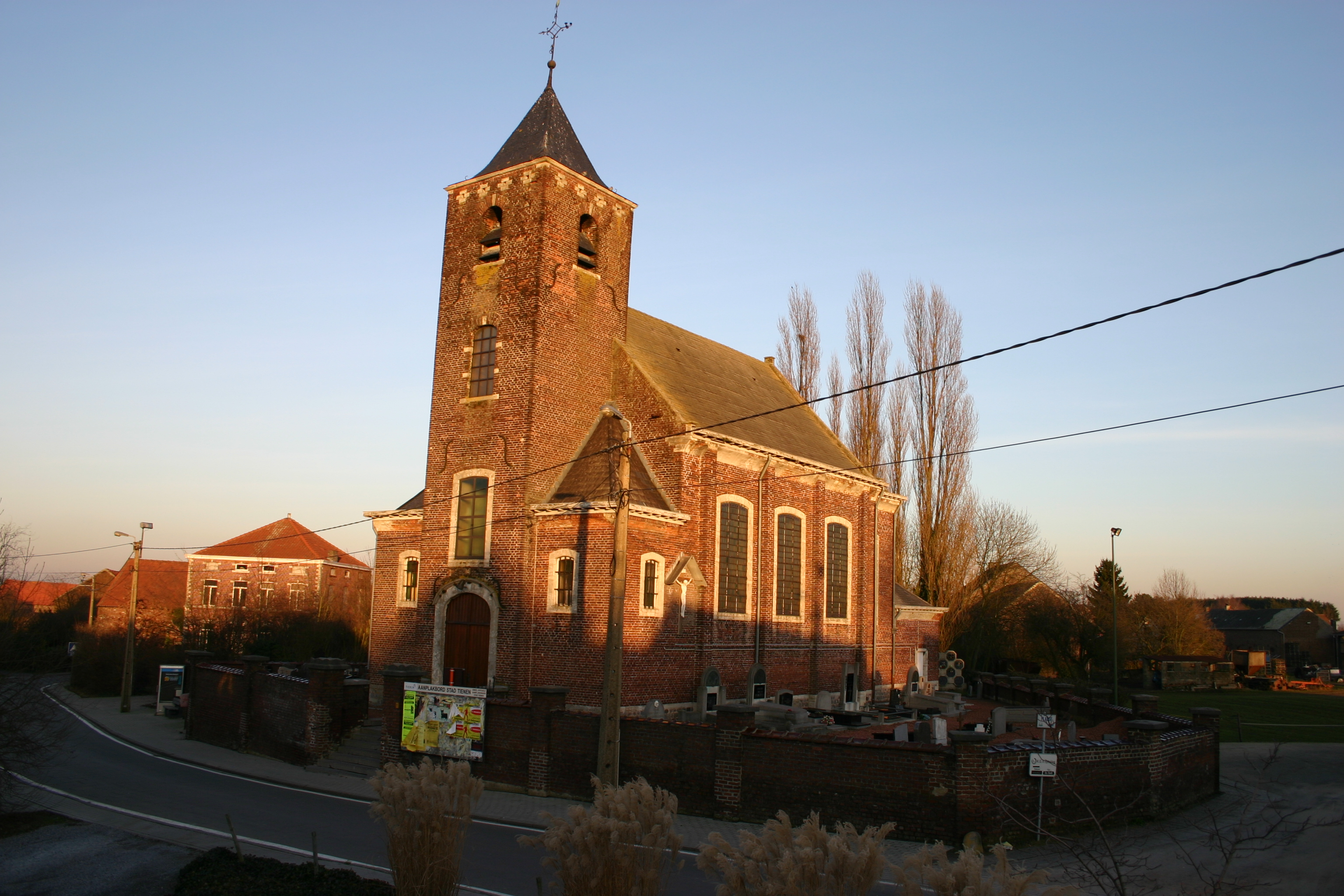
The church of Saint Maarten (Sint-Maartenskerk)

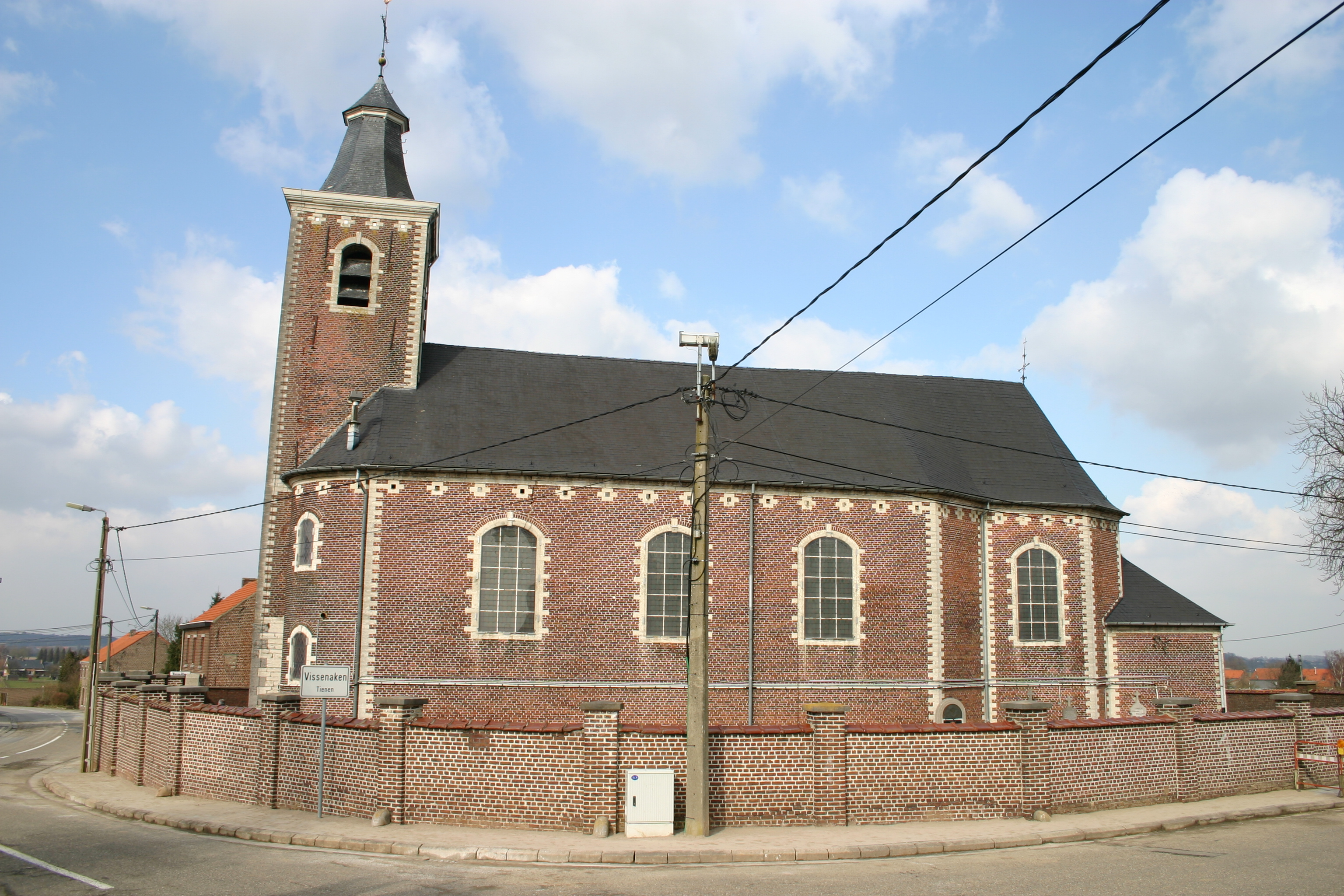
The church of Saint Peter (Sint-Pieterskerk)
