= Himelin =

Irish or Scottish priest and saint

Saint Himelin
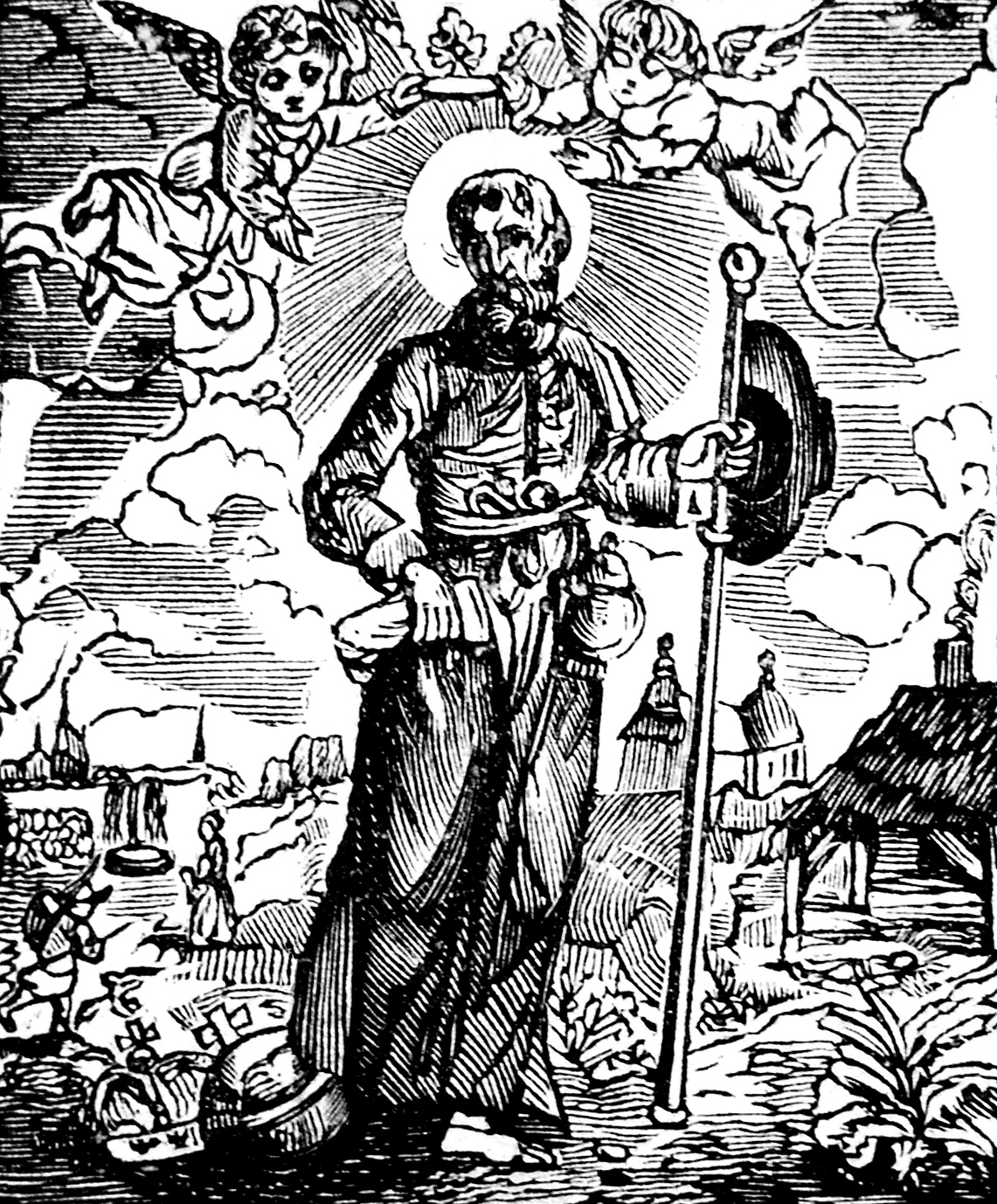
- Died: c. 750; Vissenaken (Tienen)
- Venerated in: Roman Catholic Church, Orthodox Church
- Major shrine: Vissenaken
- Feast: March 10
- Attributes: Depicted as a pilgrim, with a staff; or ill in bed

Saint Himelin (Hymelin, Himelinus) (died Vissenaken, c. 750 AD) was an Irish or Scottish priest who, returning from a pilgrimage to Rome, fell ill when passing through Vissenaken (in present-day part of the municipality Tienen in Belgium).

He is said to have been the brother of Rumbold, patron saint of Mechelen.

The legend of Saint Himelin states that in Vissenaken he asked a girl for some water. She refused, as there was bubonic plague in the area. However, after much insistence from Himelin, she finally gave him a pitcher of water, which miraculously turned into wine. Himelin died three days later of the plague. He is venerated on 10 March. His cult is confined to Vissenaken.

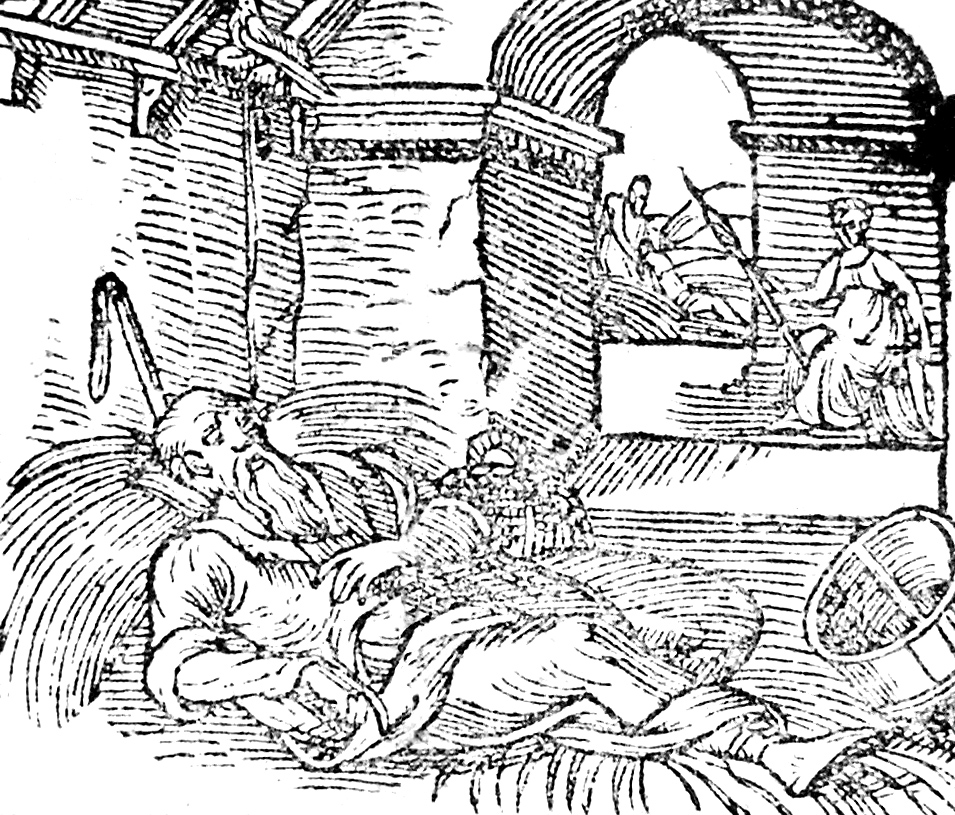

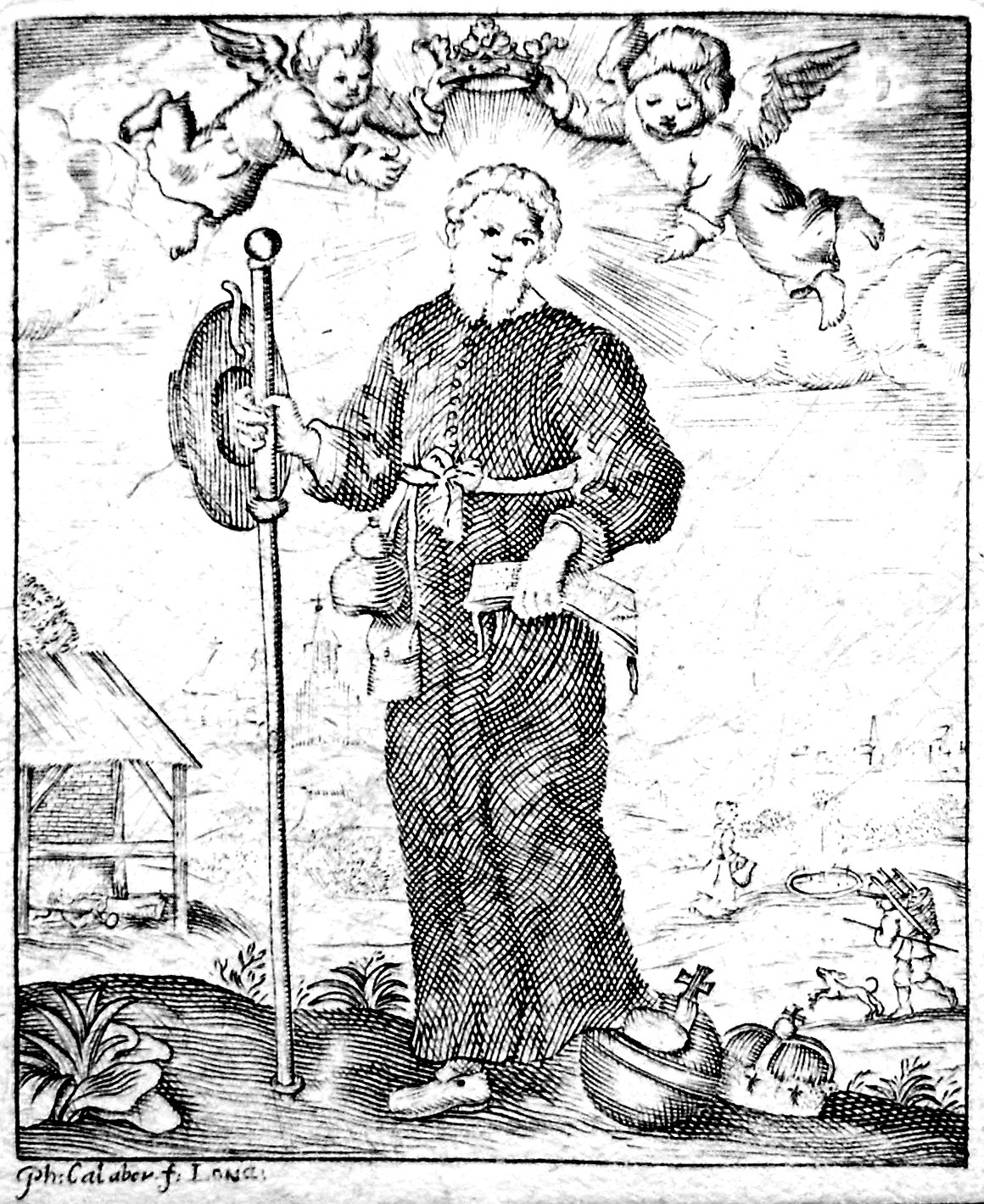

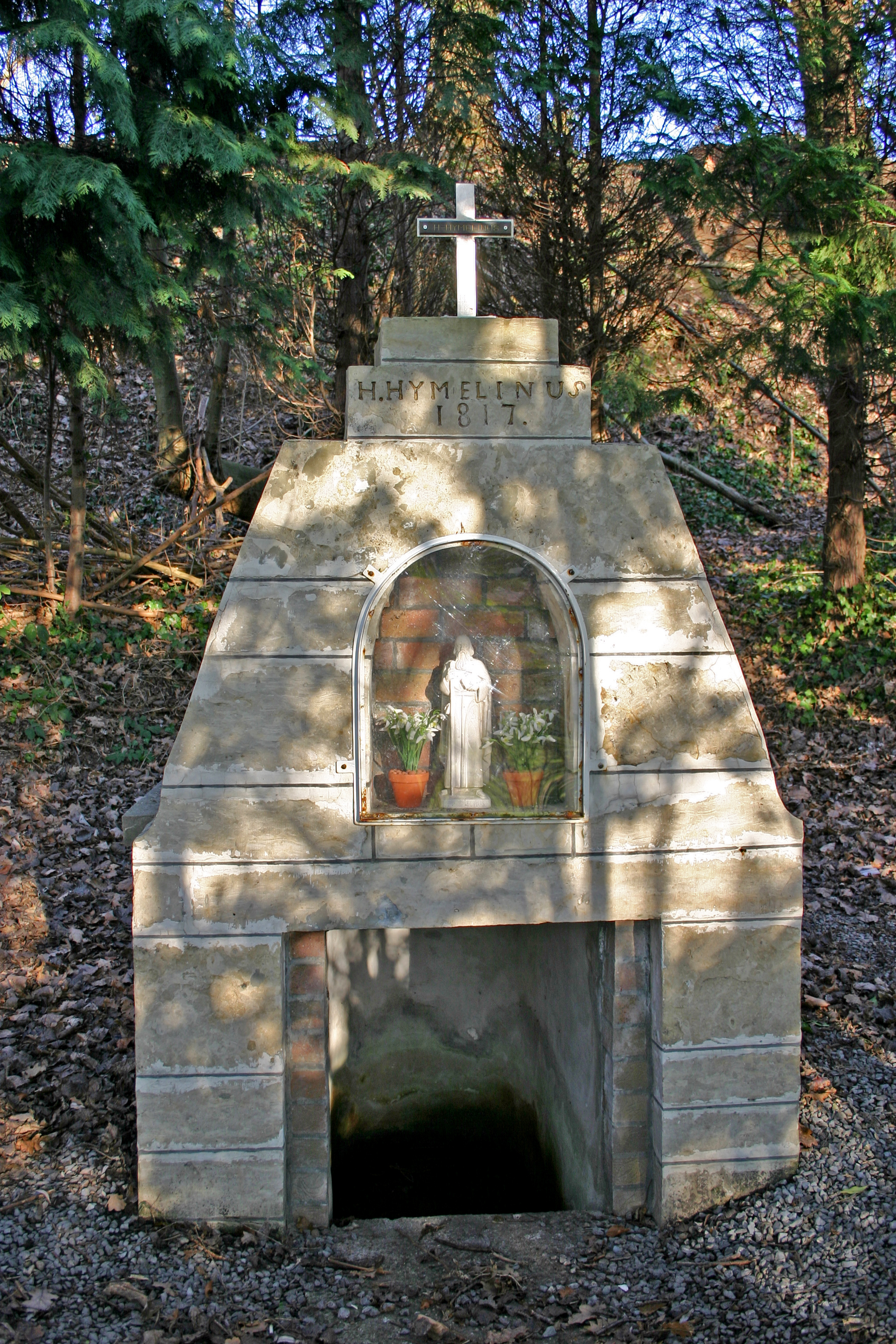
