= Thalelæus of Syria =

Syrian hermit (d. 460)

Saint Thalelæus Hermit
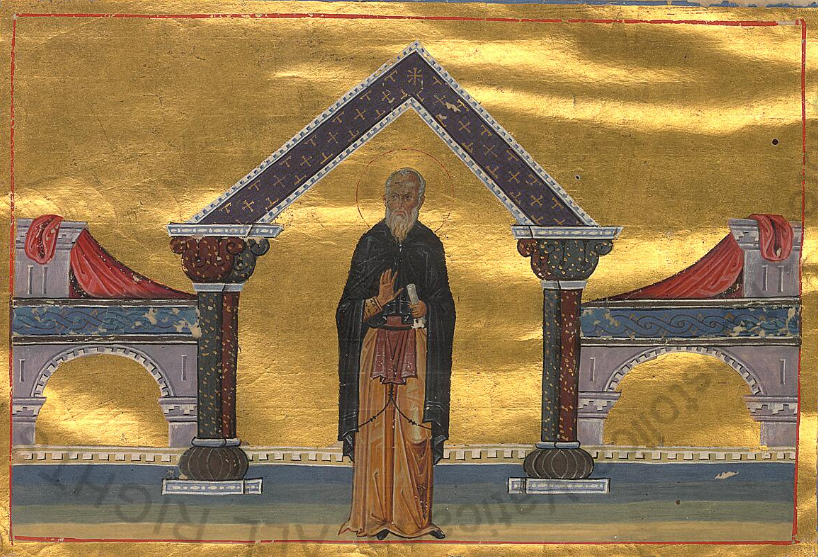
- Icon of Thalelæus in the Menologion of Basil II
- Born: Cilicia, Asia Minor
- Died: c. 460; Syria
- Feast: 27 February

Saint Thalelæus (or Thalilaeus Epiklautos, (Note: Epiklautos (Greek: Επίκλαυτος) may be translated as "the weeper".) Greek: Θαλλελαίου; died c. 460) was a 5th-century Syrian hermit known for continuous weeping. His feast day is 27 February.

== Life ==
Saint Thalelæus was born in Cilicia in Asia Minor. He was ordained as a presbyter in the monastery of Saint Sabbas the Sanctified. He later moved to a graveyard beside a run-down pagan temple in Syria near Gabala, (Note: Gabala is the Byzantine name for the city now called Jableh) where he lived in a tent. Travellers passing by were afraid of the unclean spirits that haunted the place. The monk lived alone, praying day and night, and eventually drove away the demons. He built himself a tiny cramped hut where he lived for another ten years. Through his example and miracles he made many converts, who built a church in place of the pagan temple. He died about 460.

== Sources ==
The sources used by modern scholars are the Ecclesiastical History by Theodoret and the Spiritual Meadow by John Moschus. Here passages from a few 18th- to 20th-century vitae collections, alphabetically by author.

=== Baring-Gould ===
Sabine Baring-Gould (1834–1924) in his The Lives Of The Saints wrote under February 27,

S. THALELÆUS, H. (about A.D. 460.)
[Greek Menaea. No commemoration in Western Church. Authority: —Theodoret, Philothaus, c. xxviii.]

Not only have I heard of this man from others," says Theodoret, " but I saw him myself." Thalelæus erected for his habitation a small hut against an idol shrine, near Gabala, to which many people resorted, and where they offered sacrifice to devils. The evil spirits, enraged at his thus assaulting them in their sanctuary, endeavoured by hideous clamours and frightful apparitions, to scare the Christian hermit away; but every effort of demons and idolaters to drive him from this shrine proved ineffectual. Thalelæus succeeded in converting many who came as votaries to the temple, and persuaded them to bend their necks to the sweet yoke of Christ's law. With many of these converts Theodoret conversed.

After that Thalelæus had lived thus a while, he devised for himself a strange and horrible penance. He made two wheels, and then joined them by pieces of wood into a species of barrel, but open between the bars. He enclosed himself within this case, which was so low that his chin rested on his knees, and remained therein for many years. He had been ten years in it when Theodoret saw him. This frightful self-immolation is by no means to be regarded as deserving of imitation. But it was called forth by peculiar circumstances, and for a special purpose. The rude people of Syria could be impressed no other way. To win these souls from heathenism this phase of the ascetic life was evoked, it served its purpose, and passed away.

=== Butler ===
The hagiographer Alban Butler (1710–1773) wrote in his Lives of the Fathers, Martyrs, and Other Principal Saints under February 27,

St. Thalilæus, a Cilician, lived a recluse on a mountain in Syria. He shut himself up ten years in an open cage of wood. Theodoret asked him why he had chosen so singular a practice. The penitent answered: "I punish my criminal body, that God seeing my affliction for my sins, may be moved to pardon them, and to deliver me from, or at least to mitigate, the excessive torments of the world to come, which I have deserved." See Theodoret, Phil. c. 28. John Mosch in the Spiritual Meadow, c. 59. p. 872, relates that Thalilæus, the Cilician, spent sixty years in an ascetic life, weeping almost without intermission; and that he used to say to those who came to him: "Time is allowed us by the divine mercy for repentance and satisfaction, and woe to us if we neglect it."

=== Hone ===
William Hone in his Every Day Book, Or, A Guide to the Year wrote, under February 27,

St. Thalilæus.
This saint was a weeper in Syria. He hermitized on a mountain during sixty years, wept almost without intermission for his sins, and lived for ten years in a wooden cage.

=== Monks of Ramsgate ===
The monks of St Augustine's Abbey, Ramsgate wrote in their Book of Saints (1921),

Thalilæus (St.) (Feb. 27)
(5th cent.) A hermit in Cilicia (Asia Minor), who passed sixty years in the practice of the most severe penance.

== See also ==
- Thalelaeus the Unmercenary
- Thalelaeus, antecessor (law professor) of the Justinianic era, who cited the Codex Gregorianus in his commentary on Codex Justinianus

== Sources ==
- Baring-Gould, Sabine (1897), The Lives Of The Saints, vol. 2, February, London: J. C. Nimmo This article incorporates text from this source, which is in the public domain.
- Butler, Alban (1798), The Lives of the Primitive Fathers, Martyrs, and Other Principal Saints, vol. II, Edinburgh: J. Moir This article incorporates text from this source, which is in the public domain.
- Hone, William (1826), The Every Day Book, Or, A Guide to the Year: Describing the Popular Amusements Sports, Ceremonies, Manners Customs & Events Incident to the Three Hundred & Sixty-five Days, in Past & Present Times, vol. 1, W. Tegg
- St. Augustine's Abbey, Ramsgate (1921), The Book of saints : a dictionary of servants of God canonized by the Catholic Church, London: A. & C. Black, ltd. This article incorporates text from this source, which is in the public domain.
- Venerable Thalelaeus the Hermit of Syria, The Orthodox Church in America
