= July 9 (Eastern Orthodox liturgics) =

Day in the Eastern Orthodox liturgical calendar

Eastern Orthodox liturgical calendar
| July 8 | July 9 | July 10 |
July 9 O.S. ≍ July 22 N.S. July 9 N.S ≍ June 26 O.S.

An Eastern Orthodox cross

July 9 in Eastern Orthodox liturgical calendars is a feast day and a day of commemoration of saints and martyrs. Although some Orthodox churches use the Revised Julian Calendar and others use the traditional Julian calendar, the fixed commemorations for their respective July 9 are broadly the same, no matter which calendar is used. (Note: Despite the dates being the same, the days to which they refer typically differ by 13 days. The notation Old Style or O.S. is sometimes used to indicate a date in the traditional Julian Calendar (the "Old Calendar"). The notation New Style or N.S. indicates a date in the Revised Julian calendar (the "New Calendar").)

== Saints ==
- Hieromartyr Pancratius, Bishop of Taormina in Sicily (1st century)
- Hieromartyr Cyril, Bishop of Gortyna in Crete (c. 303) (Note: "At Gortyna, in Crete, in the persecution of Decius, under the governor Lucius, St. Cyril, a bishop, who was thrown into the flames without being injured, though his bonds were burnt. The judge, struck with awe at so great a miracle, set him at liberty, but as the saint began again immediately to preach the faith of Christ with zeal, he was beheaded.") (see also: September 6, June 14)
- Martyrs Andreas and Probus, by fire.
- Monkmartyrs Patermuthius and Coprius, and Martyr Alexander the Soldier, of Egypt (361-363) (Note: "At Alexandria, the holy martyrs Patermuthius, Copres, and Alexander, who were put to death under Julian the Apostate.") (see also: December 17)
- Saints Patermuthius and Coprius, ascetics, of Egypt (4th century)
- Saint Theodore of Edessa (Theodore the Savvaitis), Bishop of Edessa (848)
- Saint Theodosius, Stylite, of Edessa (9th century)
- Venerable Photius, founder of Akapniou Monastery in Thessaloniki (10th century)

== Pre-Schism Western saints ==
- Saints Anatolia and Audax, martyrs in Rome under Decius (c. 250) (Note: Confined to a prison near Rieti the small village now called Sant' Anatolia. Anatolia's miracles converted Audax, one of the guards.) (Note: "In the town of Thora, on lake Velino, in Italy, the martyrdom of the Saints Anatolia and Audax, under the emperor Decius. Anatolia, a virgin consecrated to Christ, cured, through the whole province of Picenum (now Ancona), many persons laboring under various infirmities, and made them believe in Christ. By order of the judge Fustinian, she was condemned to various kinds of punishments. She was cured of the sting of a serpent to which she had been exposed; a miracle which converted Audax to the faith. Finally she was transpierced with a sword, whilst her hands were extended in prayer. Audax was committed to prison, and being without delay sentenced to capital punishment, obtained the crown of a martyr.")
- Saint Brictius, Bishop of Martola near Spoleto in Umbria in Italy (c. 312) (Note: He was imprisoned for Orthodoxy under Diocletian. He escaped death and died a confessor under Constantine.) (Note: "At Martula, St. Brixius, bishop. Under the judge Marcian, after having suffered much for the confession of our Lord, and converted to Christ a great multitude of people, he rested in peace.")
- Saint Agrippinus of Autun, Bishop of Autun in France, he ordained St Germanus of Paris to the deaconate and the priesthood (538)
- Hieromartyrs at Wurzburg: Killian, Bishop in East Franconia and Thuringia, and his companions Hieromonk Colman and Hierodeacon Totman (689) (see also: July 8 )
- Saint Golvinus (Golwen), Bishop of St Pol-de-Léon (Quimper) in Brittany (7th century) (Note: Born in Britain, his holiness led to him becoming Bishop of St Pol-de-Léon in Brittany. He reposed in Rennes where his relics are enshrined.)
- Saint Everilda (Everildis, Averil), Abbess of a monastery at Everingham in Yorkshire, Northumbria (c. 700) (Note: Born in England, she became a nun at a place called 'the Bishop's Farm', later known as Everingham (in Yorkshire), where she became abbess of a convent of some eighty nuns.)
- Saint Agilulfus of Cologne, a monk and Abbot of Stavelot-Malmédy in Belgium, and Archbishop of Cologne in Germany (c. 750) (Note: His martyrdom was the result of his zeal and was aided by the connivance of Charles Martel.)
- Saint Justus of Poland, one of four hermit-brothers in Poland - Sts Benedict, Andrew, Barnabas and Justus (1008)

== Post-Schism Orthodox saints ==
- Saint Euthymius the Enlightener of Karelia (1435)
- Hieromartyr Peter, Priest, of Cherevkov, Vologda (early 17th century)
- Venerables Dionysius the Rhetorician (1606) and Metrophanes (17th century), of Little St. Anne’s Skete, Mount Athos.

=== New martyrs and confessors ===
- New Martyr Michael Paknanas the Gardener, of Athens (1770)
- New Hieromartyr Methodius, Bishop of Lappa on Crete (1793)
- New Hieromartyr Constantine Lebedev, Priest (1918)

== Other commemorations ==
- Commemoration of the consecration of the church of Church of St. Mary of the Spring (Zoödochos Pege) in Constantinople (559)
- Icon of the Mother of God of Cyprus (392), in the village of Stromyn near Moscow. (see also: April 20 )
- Icon of the Mother of God of Koloch (1413)
- Uncovering of the relics of St. Gabriel, Archimandrite of St. Elias Skete, Mt. Athos (1994) (Note: See: (in Russian) Гавриил Афонский. Википедии. (Russian Wikipedia).)
- Repose of Righteous Patermuphy of Valaam and St. Alexander Nevsky Lavra (c. 1825)
- Repose of Hierodeacon Melchizedek of the Roslavl Forests (1840)
- Repose of Priest Ilie Lacatusu of Romania (1983) (Note: See: (in Romanian) Ilie Lăcătușu. Wikipedia. (Romanian Wikipedia).)

== Icon gallery ==
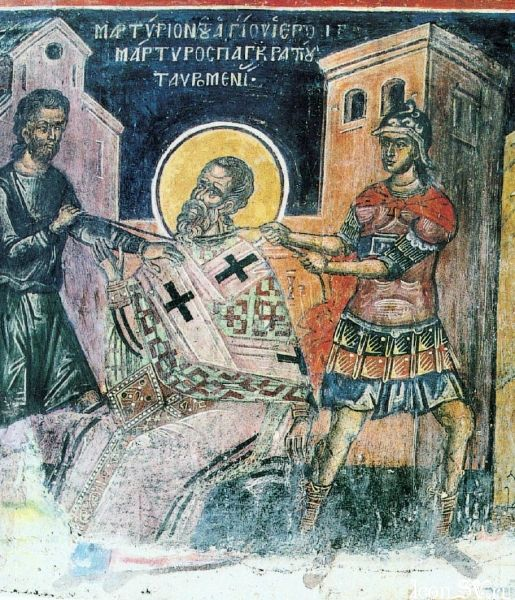
Martyrdom of St. Pancratius, Bishop of Taormina.

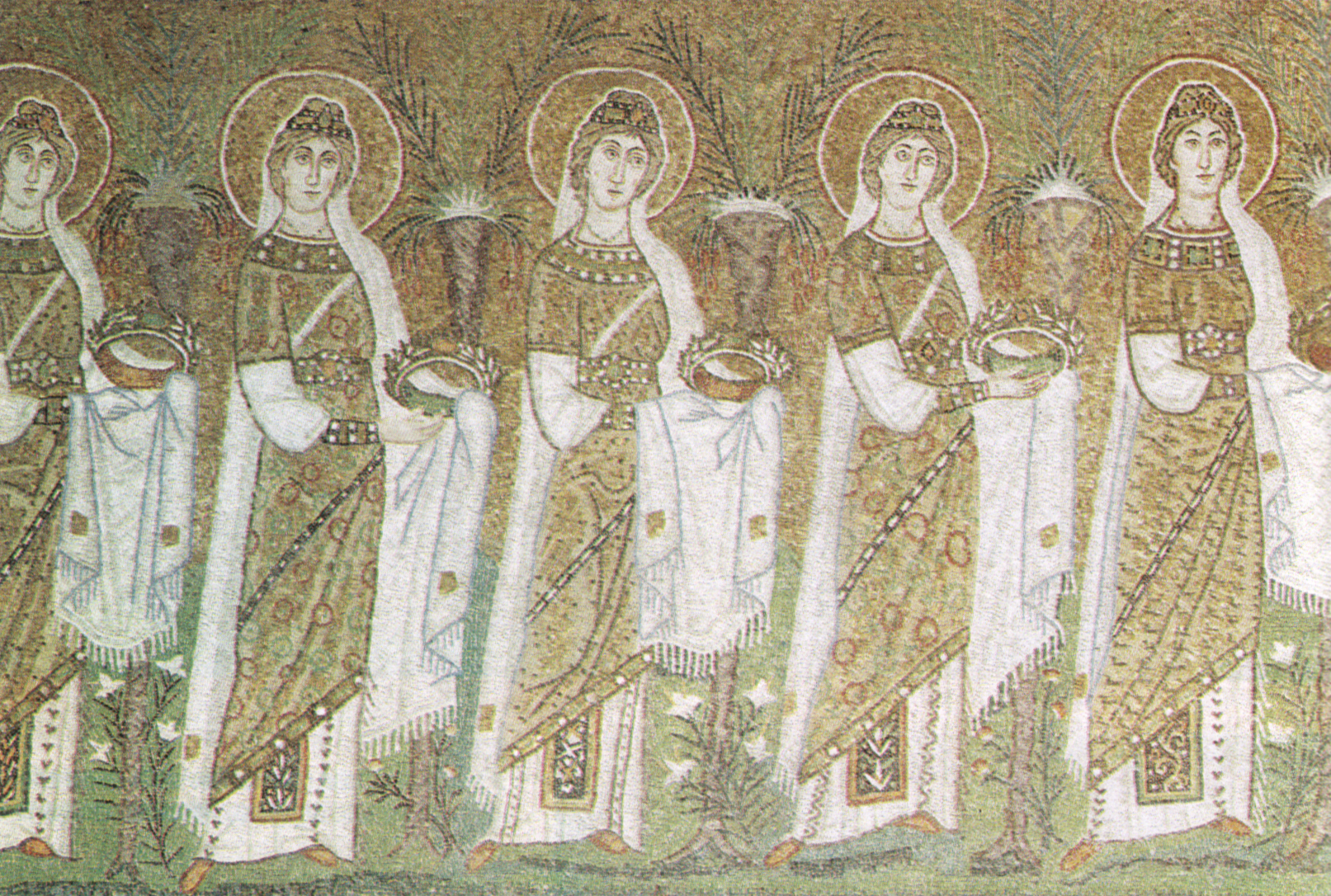
Victoria and Anatolia, portrayed amongst the mosaic Procession of Virgins (Basilica of Sant'Apollinare Nuovo, Ravenna).

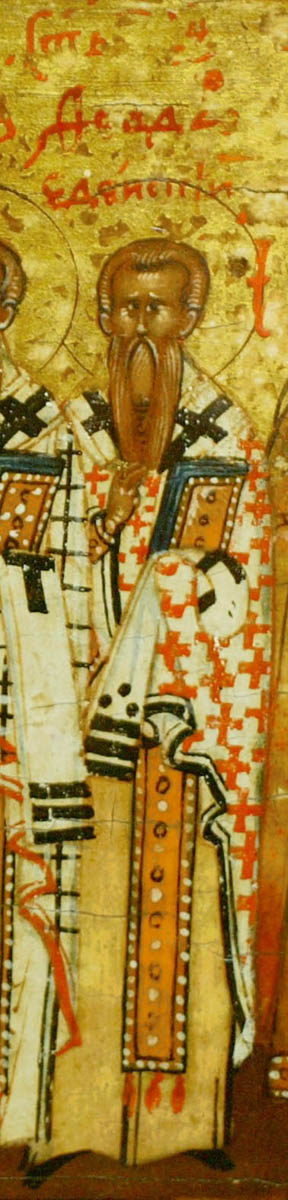
St. Theodore, Bp. of Edessa.

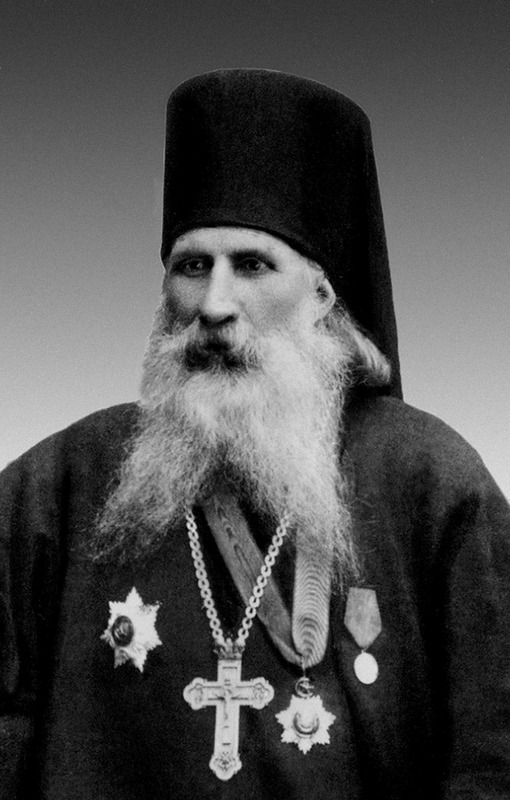
Archimandrite Gabriel of St. Elias Skete, Mt. Athos.

== Sources ==
- July 9/July 22. Orthodox Calendar (PRAVOSLAVIE.RU).
- July 22 / July 9. HOLY TRINITY RUSSIAN ORTHODOX CHURCH (A parish of the Patriarchate of Moscow).
- July 9. OCA - The Lives of the Saints.
- July 9. The Year of Our Salvation - Holy Transfiguration Monastery, Brookline, Massachusetts.
- The Autonomous Orthodox Metropolia of Western Europe and the Americas (ROCOR). St. Hilarion Calendar of Saints for the year of our Lord 2004. St. Hilarion Press (Austin, TX). pp. 50–51.
- The Ninth Day of the Month of July. Orthodoxy in China.
- July 9. Latin Saints of the Orthodox Patriarchate of Rome.
- The Roman Martyrology. Transl. by the Archbishop of Baltimore. Last Edition, According to the Copy Printed at Rome in 1914. Revised Edition, with the Imprimatur of His Eminence Cardinal Gibbons. Baltimore: John Murphy Company, 1916. pp. 200–201.
- Rev. Richard Stanton. A Menology of England and Wales, or, Brief Memorials of the Ancient British and English Saints Arranged According to the Calendar, Together with the Martyrs of the 16th and 17th Centuries. London: Burns & Oates, 1892. pp. 328–329.

Greek Sources

- Great Synaxaristes: (in Greek) 9 ΙΟΥΛΙΟΥ. ΜΕΓΑΣ ΣΥΝΑΞΑΡΙΣΤΗΣ.
- (in Greek) Συναξαριστής. 9 Ιουλίου. ECCLESIA.GR. (H ΕΚΚΛΗΣΙΑ ΤΗΣ ΕΛΛΑΔΟΣ).
- (in Greek) ΙΟΥΛΙΟΣ. Αποστολική Διακονία της Εκκλησίας της Ελλάδος (Apostoliki Diakonia of the Church of Greece).
- (in Greek) 09/07/2018. Ορθόδοξος Συναξαριστής.

Russian Sources

- (in Russian) 22 июля (9 июля). Православная Энциклопедия под редакцией Патриарха Московского и всея Руси Кирилла (электронная версия). (Orthodox Encyclopedia - Pravenc.ru).
- (in Russian) 9 июля по старому стилю / 22 июля по новому стилю. СПЖ "Союз православных журналистов". 2018.
- (in Russian) 9 июля (ст.ст.) 22 июля 2014 (нов. ст.). Русская Православная Церковь Отдел внешних церковных связей. (DECR).
