= August 5 (Eastern Orthodox liturgics) =

Day in the Eastern Orthodox liturgical calendar

Eastern Orthodox liturgical calendar
August 4	August 5	August 6
August 5 O.S. ≍ August 18 N.S. August 5 N.S ≍ July 23 O.S.

An Eastern Orthodox cross

August 5 in Eastern Orthodox liturgical calendars is a feast day and a day of commemoration of saints and martyrs. Although some Orthodox churches use the Revised Julian Calendar and others use the traditional Julian calendar, the fixed commemorations for their respective August 5 are broadly the same, no matter which calendar is used. (Note: Despite the dates being the same, the days to which they refer typically differ by 13 days. The notation Old Style or O.S. is sometimes used to indicate a date in the traditional Julian Calendar (the "Old Calendar"). The notation New Style or N.S. indicates a date in the Revised Julian calendar (the "New Calendar").)

== Feasts ==
- Forefeast of the Transfiguration of Jesus.

== Saints ==
- Hieromartyrs Antherus (236) (Note: Saint Antherus, a Greek who was Pope of Rome for only a few weeks. He may have been martyred and was buried in the catacomb of St Callistus, the first Pope to be so. In the West he is commemorated on January 3.) and Fabian (Fabianus) (250), (Note: Fabian succeeded St Antherus as Pope of Rome in 236 and was martyred in 250 under Decius. St Cyprian described him as an 'incomparable man' and added that the glory of his death matched the purity and goodness of his life. In the West he is commemorated on January 20.) Popes of Rome.
- Martyr Pontius, at Cimella in Gaul (257)
- Martyr Eusignius of Antioch (362) (Note: "At Antioch, St. Eusignius, a soldier, who at the age of one hundred and ten years, because he reproached Julian the Apostate for forsaking the faith of Constantine the Great, under whom he had served, and for having degenerated from his ancestors' piety, was decapitated by his command.")
- Righteous Nonna (374), wife of Gregory of Nazianzus the Elder and mother of St. Gregory the Theologian.
- Martyrs Cantidius and Cantidianus, brothers, of Egypt, by stoning (4th century) (Note: "Also, the holy martyrs Cantidius, Cantidian, and Sobel, Egyptians.")
  - Martyr Sibelius (Sobel) of Egypt, shot by bow and arrow (4th century)
- Saint Therissos (Thyrsos), Bishop of Karpasia, Cyprus. (Note: Some hagiographies repeat his memory on July 23.)
- Saint Euthymius I, Patriarch of Constantinople (917)

== Pre-Schism Western saints ==
- Saint Memmius (Menge, Meinge), Founder and first Bishop of Châlons-sur-Marne in France, and Apostle of the region (c. 300) (Note: "At Chalons, in France, St. Memmius, a Roman citizen, who, being consecrated bishop of that city by St. Peter, brought to the truth of the Gospel the people committed to his care.")
- Twenty-three (23) Martyrs of Rome, on the Salarian Way in Rome, under Diocletian (303) (Note: "Also at Rome, during the persecution of Diocletian, the martyrdom of twenty-three holy martyrs, who were beheaded on the Salarian road, and buried at the foot of Cucumer hill.")
- Saint Emygdius (Emidius), a saint whose relics were venerated in Ascoli in Italy (c. 303) (Note: "At Ascoli, in the Marches, St. Emygdins, bishop and martyr, who was consecrated bishop by pope St. Marcellus, and sent thither to preach the Gospel. He received the crown of martyrdom for the confession of Christ, under the emperor Diocletian.")
- Martyr Afra, in Augsburg in Germany, under Diocletian (c. 304) (Note: "At Augsburg, the birthday of St. Afra, martyr. After being converted from Paganism by the instructions of bishop St. Narcissus, and being baptized with all her household, she was delivered to the flames for the confession of Christ." She was venerated there from early times and the monastery of that city was dedicated to her.)
- Saint Paris, Bishop of Teano near Naples in Italy (346)
- Saint Cassian of Autun, Bishop of Autun in France, 314-350, he succeeded St Reticius and was famous for his miracles (c. 350)
- Saint Venantius, the most famous of the ancient Bishops of Viviers in France (544)
- Martyr Oswald of Northumbria, King of Northumbria (642) (Note: The successor of St Edwin on the throne of Northumbria in England, he was baptised in exile on Iona. In 635 he defeated the Welsh King Cadwalla and so his real reign began. One of his main aims was to enlighten his country and so he called on St Aidan to help him. In 642 he fell in battle at Maserfield fighting against the champion of paganism, Penda of Mercia. He has always been venerated as a martyr and his head is still in St Cuthbert's coffin in Durham.)
- Saint Abel of Reims, Archbishop of Rheims in France (c. 751)
- Saint Theodoric, Bishop of Cambrai-Arras in the north of France c 830-863 (863)
- Saint Gormcal, Abbot of Ardoileán in Galway in Ireland (1016)

== Post-Schism Orthodox saints ==
- Saint Theoctistus, Bishop of Chernigov (1123) (Note: On August 6, 1123, the Feast of the Transfiguration, St Theoctistus died, and because of the feastday, his memory is kept on August 5.)
- Venerable Monk-martyr Job the Gorge-dweller (Job of Ushchelsk), on the Mezen River (Solovki) (1628)
- New Martyr Christos of Preveza, at Kos (1668)
- Venerable Eugenius of Aetolia (1682) (Note: He was glorified by the Orthodox Church on July 1st, 1982. The date for his commemoration was August 6, but because it coincided with the Feast of the Transfiguration, it was moved to August 5th.)
- Saint John Jacob the Chozebite, of Neamț (1960) (Note: In 1968 and 1970, St John’s book SPIRITUAL NOURISHMENT was published in two volumes, with the blessing of Patriarch Benedict of Jerusalem. St John Jacob was glorified by the Romanian Orthodox Church in 1992. See also: (in Romanian) Sfântul Ioan Iacob Românul de la Hozeva. Wikipedia (Romanian Wikipedia).) (Note: Saint John the Chozebite was glorified by the Greek Orthodox Patriarchate of Jerusalem on 31 January, 2016, with his feast day placed on July 28, the date of the translation of his holy relics.) (see also: July 28 - Greek)

=== New martyrs and confessors ===
- New Hieromartyr Stephen Chitrov, Priest (1918)
- New Martyrs Eudocia Shikova, and Novices Daria Timolina, Daria Siushinskaya, and Maria, of Diveyevo Convent (1919)
- New Hieromartyr Simon (Shleyev), Bishop of Ufa (1921) (Note: See: (in Russian) Симон (Шлеёв). Википедии. (Russian Wikipedia).)
- New Hieromartyr John Smirnov, Deacon (1938)

== Other commemorations ==
- Uncovering of the relics (1967) of St. Arsenius the New of Paros (1877)

== Icon gallery ==
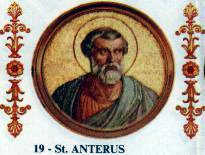
Hieromartyr Pope Anterus.

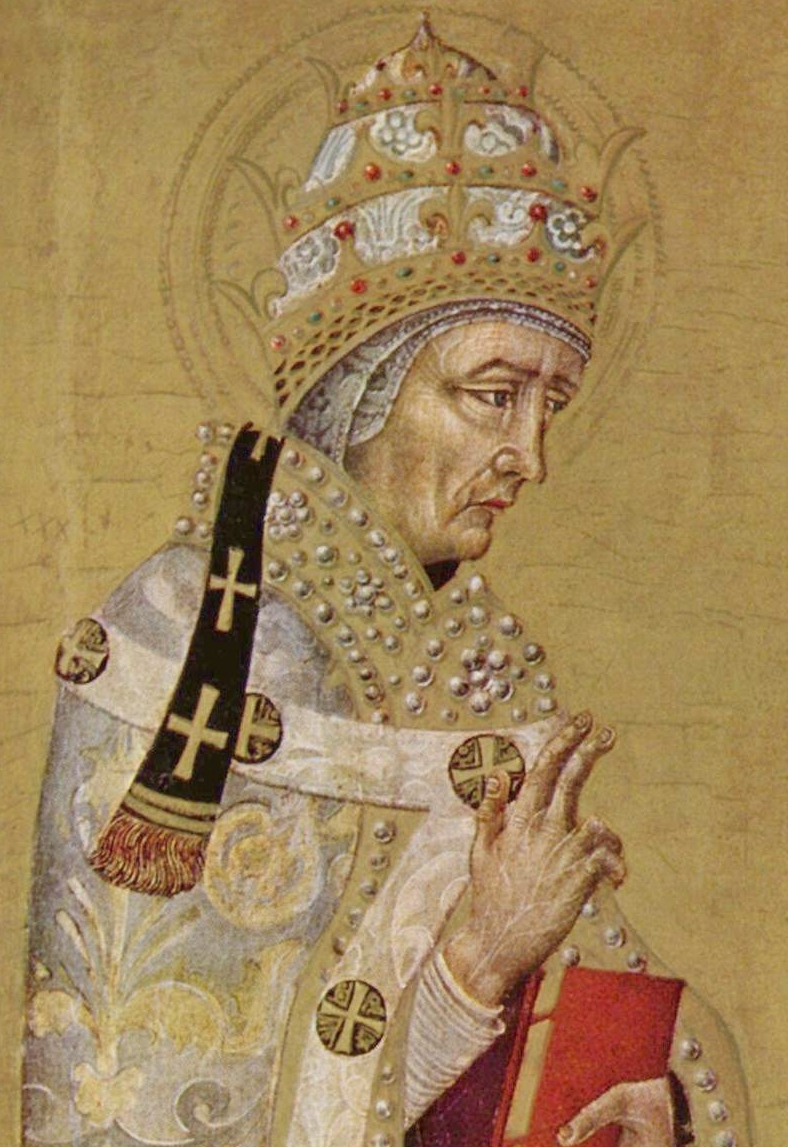
Hieromartyr Fabian (Fabianus).

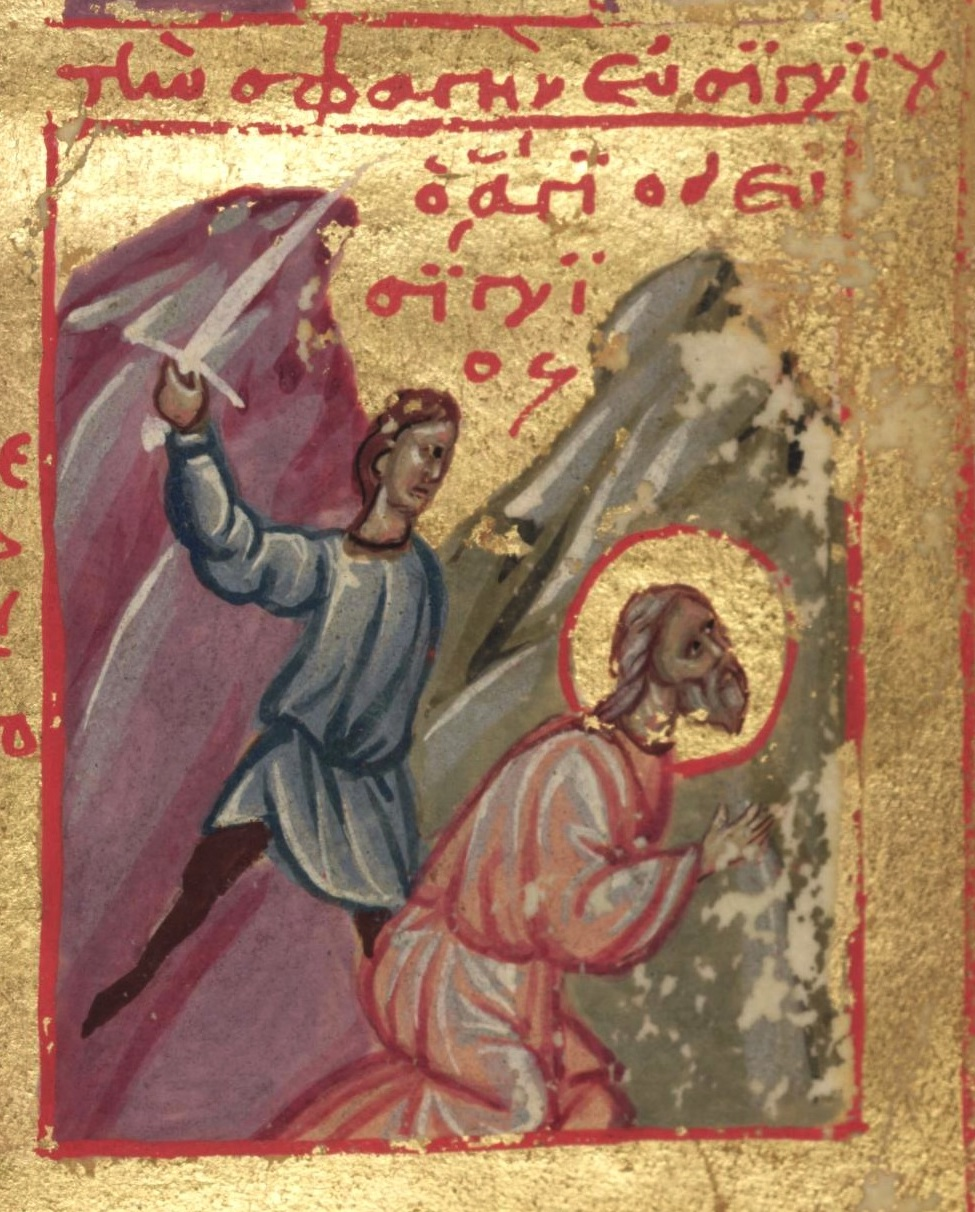
Eusignius of Antioch.

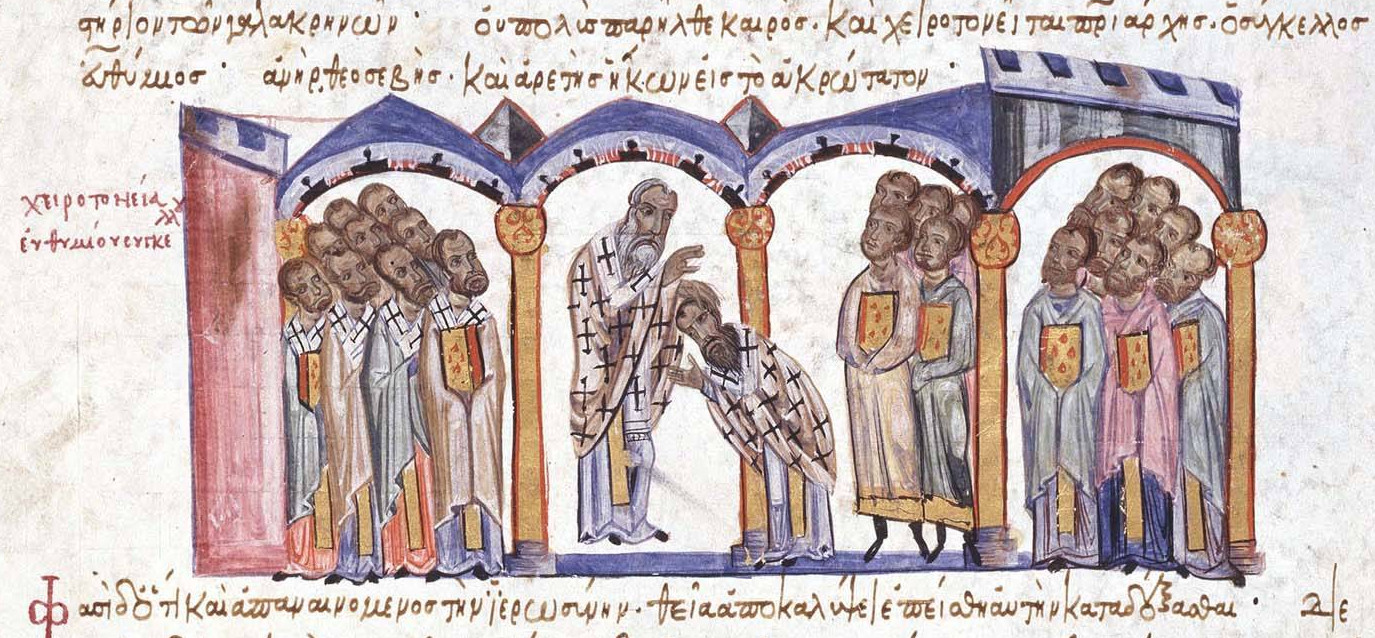
Consecration of Euthymius as Patriarch of Constantinople.

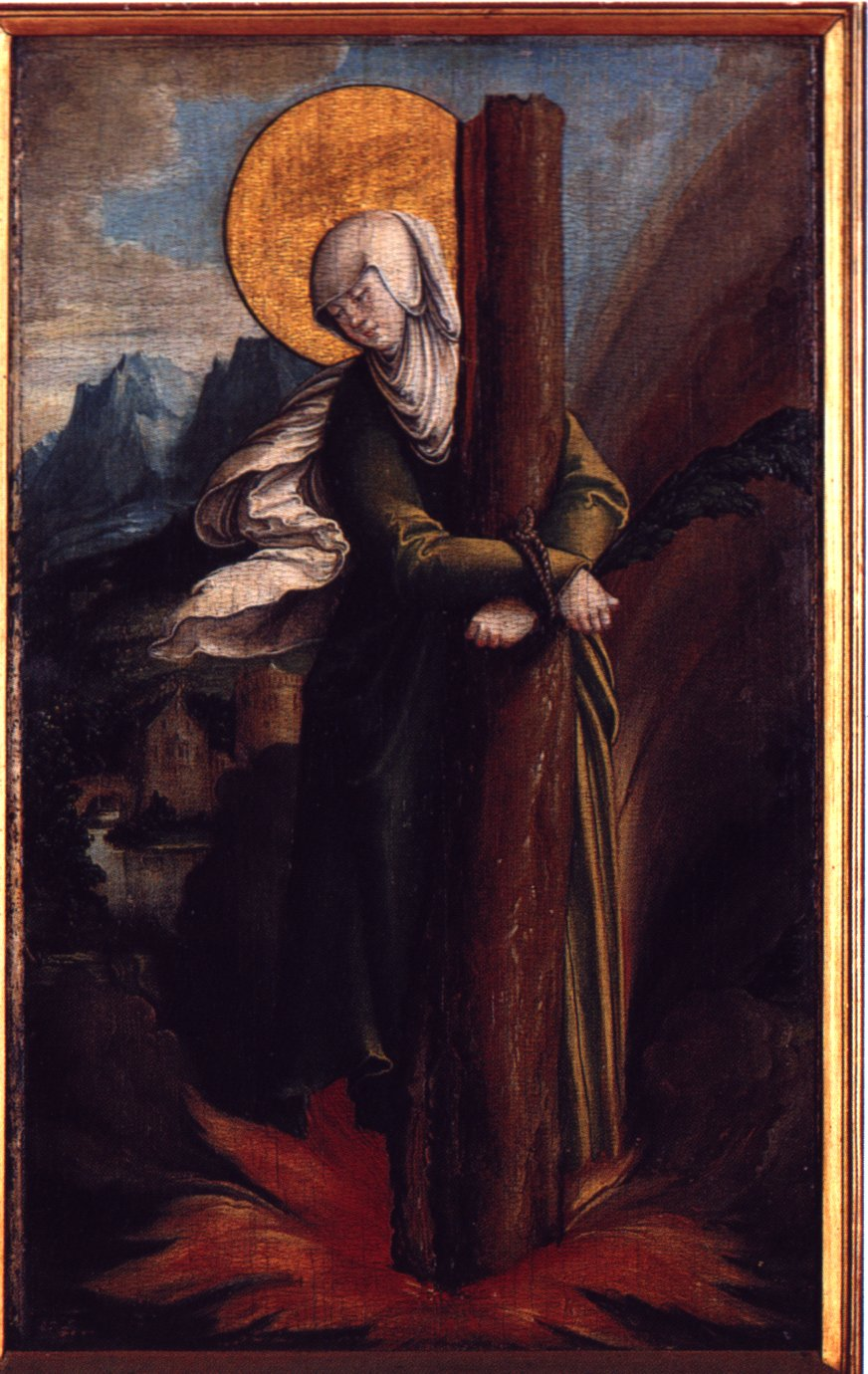
Saint Afra.

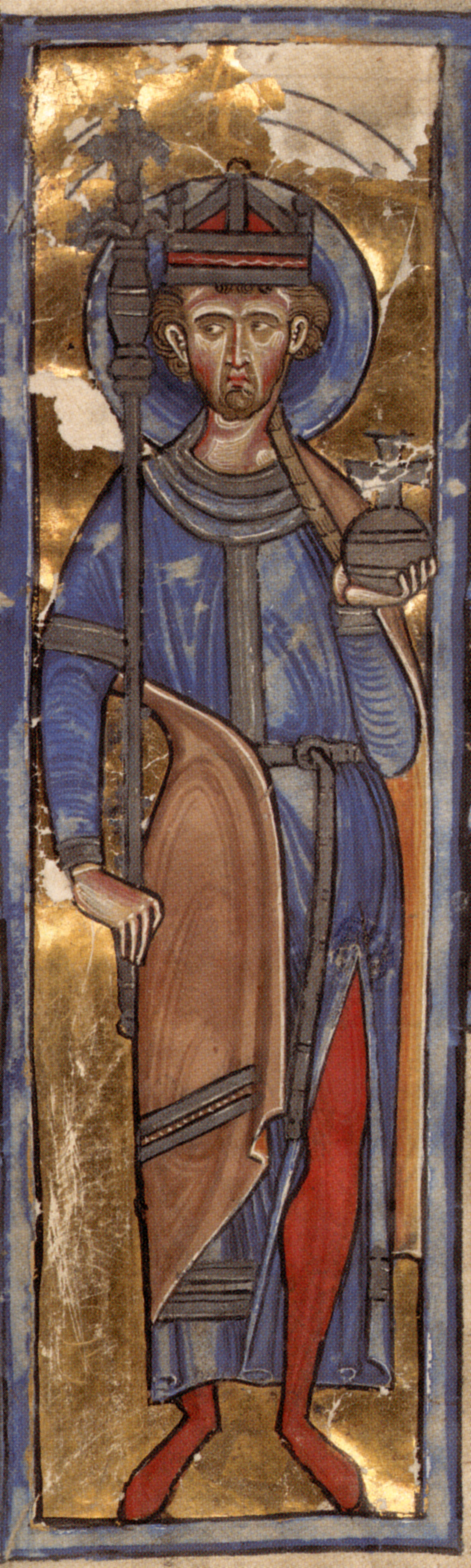
Martyr-King Oswald of Northumbria, King of Northumbria.

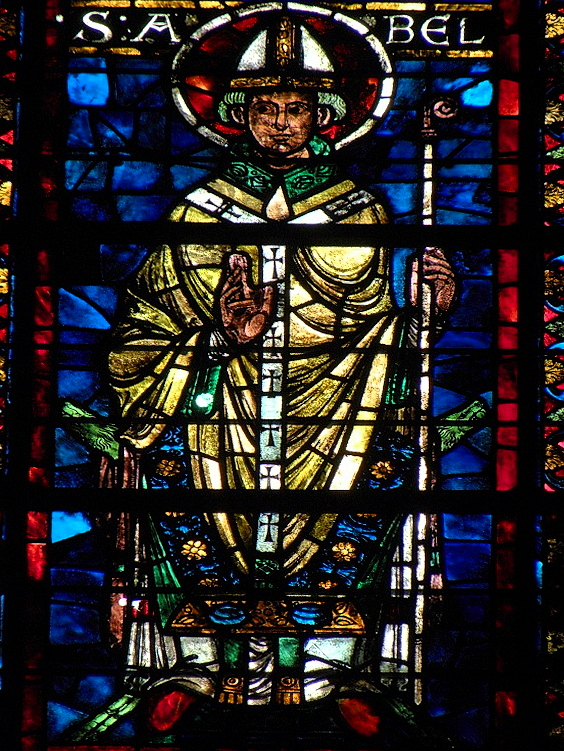
Saint Abel of Reims.

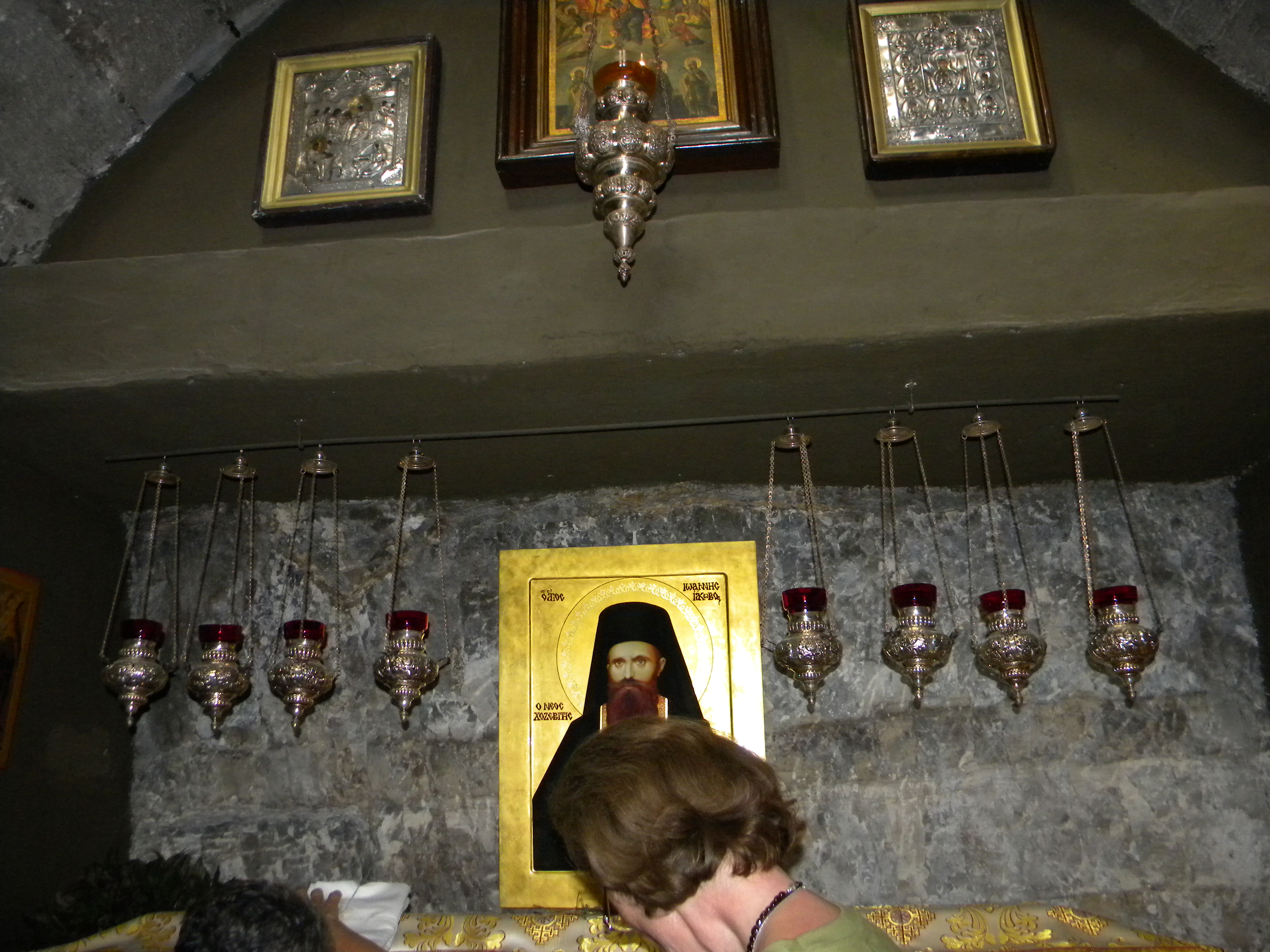
Relics of St. John Jacob the Chozebite, of Neamț, (St. George's Monastery, West Bank).

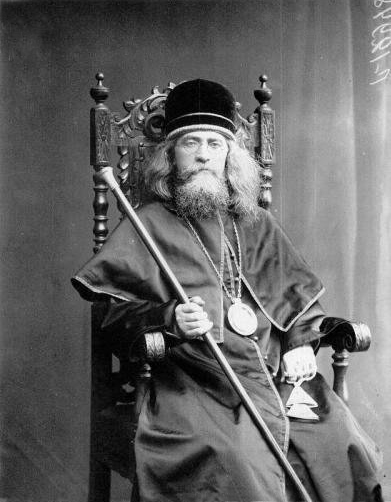
New Hieromartyr Simon (Shleyev), Bishop of Ufa.

== Sources ==
- August 5 / August 18. Orthodox Calendar (PRAVOSLAVIE.RU).
- August 18 / August 5. HOLY TRINITY RUSSIAN ORTHODOX CHURCH (A parish of the Patriarchate of Moscow).
- August 5. OCA - The Lives of the Saints.
- The Autonomous Orthodox Metropolia of Western Europe and the Americas (ROCOR). St. Hilarion Calendar of Saints for the year of our Lord 2004. St. Hilarion Press (Austin, TX). p. 57.
- Menologion: The Fifth Day of the Month of August. Orthodoxy in China.
- August 5. Latin Saints of the Orthodox Patriarchate of Rome.
- The Roman Martyrology. Transl. by the Archbishop of Baltimore. Last Edition, According to the Copy Printed at Rome in 1914. Revised Edition, with the Imprimatur of His Eminence Cardinal Gibbons. Baltimore: John Murphy Company, 1916. pp. 232-233.
- Rev. Richard Stanton. A Menology of England and Wales, or, Brief Memorials of the Ancient British and English Saints Arranged According to the Calendar, Together with the Martyrs of the 16th and 17th Centuries. London: Burns & Oates, 1892. pp. 380-382.

Greek Sources

- Great Synaxaristes: (in Greek) 5 ΑΥΓΟΥΣΤΟΥ. ΜΕΓΑΣ ΣΥΝΑΞΑΡΙΣΤΗΣ.
- (in Greek) Συναξαριστής. 5 Αυγούστου. ECCLESIA.GR. (H ΕΚΚΛΗΣΙΑ ΤΗΣ ΕΛΛΑΔΟΣ).

Russian Sources

- (in Russian) 18 августа (5 августа). Православная Энциклопедия под редакцией Патриарха Московского и всея Руси Кирилла (электронная версия). (Orthodox Encyclopedia - Pravenc.ru).
