= July 22 (Eastern Orthodox liturgics) =

Day in the Eastern Orthodox liturgical calendar

Eastern Orthodox liturgical calendar
July 21	July 22	July 23
July 22 O.S. ≍ August 4 N.S. July 22 N.S ≍ July 9 O.S.

An Eastern Orthodox cross

July 22 in Eastern Orthodox liturgical calendars is a feast day and a day of commemoration of saints and martyrs. Although some Orthodox churches use the Revised Julian Calendar and others use the traditional Julian calendar, the fixed commemorations for their respective July 22 are broadly the same, no matter which calendar is used. (Note: Despite the dates being the same, the days to which they refer typically differ by 13 days. The notation Old Style or O.S. is sometimes used to indicate a date in the traditional Julian Calendar (the "Old Calendar"). The notation New Style or N.S. indicates a date in the Revised Julian calendar (the "New Calendar").)

== Saints ==
- Holy Myrrh-bearer and Equal-to-the-Apostles Mary Magdalene (1st century) (Note: "AT Marseilles, the birthday of St. Mary Magdalen, out of whom our Lord expelled seven demons, and who deserved to be the first to see the Saviour after He had risen from the dead.") (Note: Name days celebrated today include: Magdalene, Magdalini, Magdalena (Μαγδαληνή).) (see also: May 4)
- Saint Cyril I, Patriarch of Antioch (298) (Note: "At Antioch, the holy bishop Cyril, who was distinguished for learning and holiness.")

== Pre-Schism Western saints ==
- Saint Pancharius (Pancratius), Bishop of Besançon in France, he suffered much under the Arian Emperor Constantius (c. 356)
- Saint Movean (Biteus), a disciple of St Patrick and Abbot of Inis-Coosery in Co. Down in Ireland, he also lived in Perthshire in Scotland where he reposed as a hermit.
- Saint Dabius (Davius), a priest from Ireland who preached in Scotland, where churches are dedicated to him.
- Saint Wandregisilus of Caux, Gaul (668) (Note: Born near Verdun, he served in the king's palace and married. After a pilgrimage to Rome his wife became a nun and he became a monk at Roumain-Moutier. Some ten years later he founded the monastery of Fontenelle in the north of France which came to have over three hundred monks.) (Note: "In the monastery of Blandine, the abbot St. Vandrille, celebrated for miracles.")
- Venerable Meneleus (Ménélé, Mauvier), a monk at Carméry in Auvergne, later restoring the monastery of Menat near Clermont (c. 720) (Note: "In the territory of Auvergne, St. Meneleus, abbot." Name days celebrated today include: Meneleus, Menelaos, Menelaus (Μενέλαος).) (Note: See: (in French) Ménélé. Wikipédia. (French Wikipedia).)

== Post-Schism Orthodox saints ==
- Virgin-martyr Markella of Chios (14th century) (Note: Name days celebrated today include: Markella, Marcella (Μαρκέλλα).) (Note: See also: (in Greek) Ιερό Προσκύνημα Αγίας Μαρκέλλας Χίου. Βικιπαίδεια. (Greek Wikipedia).)
- Blessed Cyprian of Suzdal, Fool-for-Christ (1622)
- Venerable Cornelius of Pereyaslavl, monk, father-confessor of Alexandrov Convent (1693) (Note: See: (in Russian) Корнилий Переяславский. Википедии. (Russian Wikipedia).)

=== New martyrs and confessors ===
- New Hieromartyr Michael Nakaryakov, Priest (1918) (Note: See: (in Russian) Накаряков, Михаил. Википедии. (Russian Wikipedia).)
- New Hieromartyr Alexis Ilinsky, Priest (1931)
- New Confessor Ilie Lăcătușu, Priest (1983) (Note: See: (in Romanian) Ilie Lăcătușu. Wikipedia. (Romanian Wikipedia).)

== Other commemorations ==
- Translation of the relics (403-404) of Hieromartyr Phocas, Bishop of Sinope (117) (see also: July 23, September 22)

== Icon gallery ==
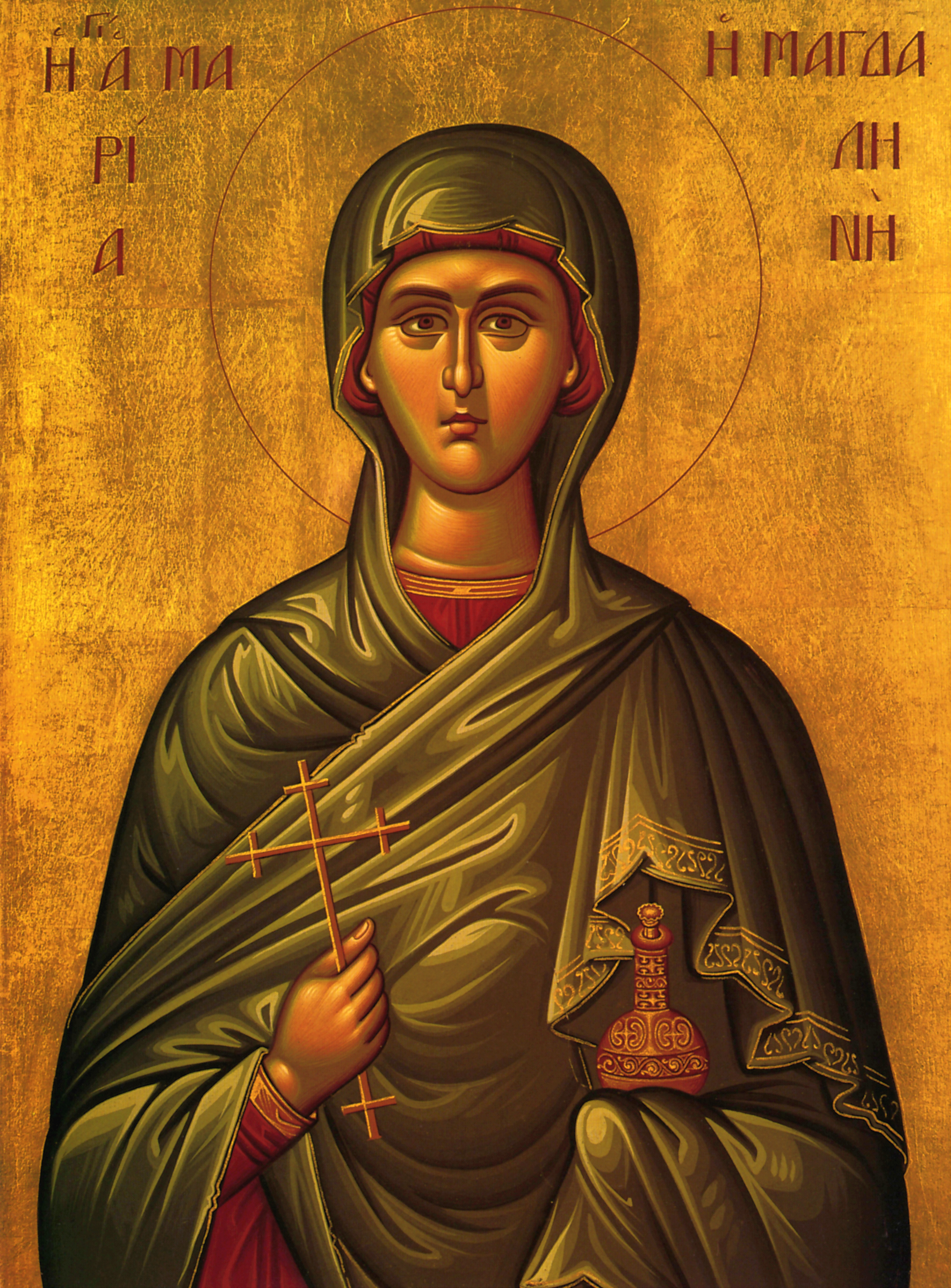
Holy Myrrh-bearer and Equal-to-the-Apostles Mary Magdalene.

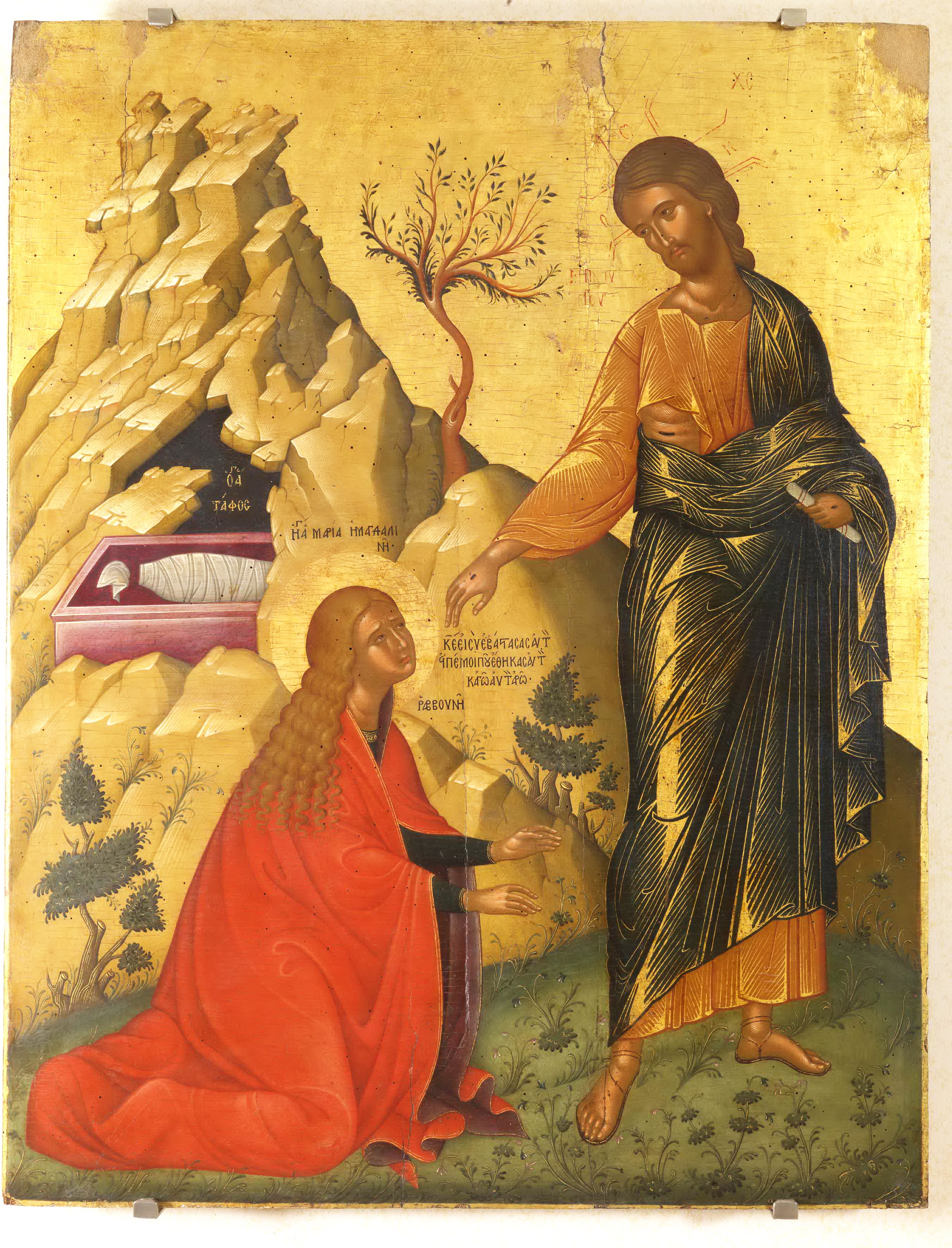
Icon of St. Mary Magdalene "Touch Me Not".

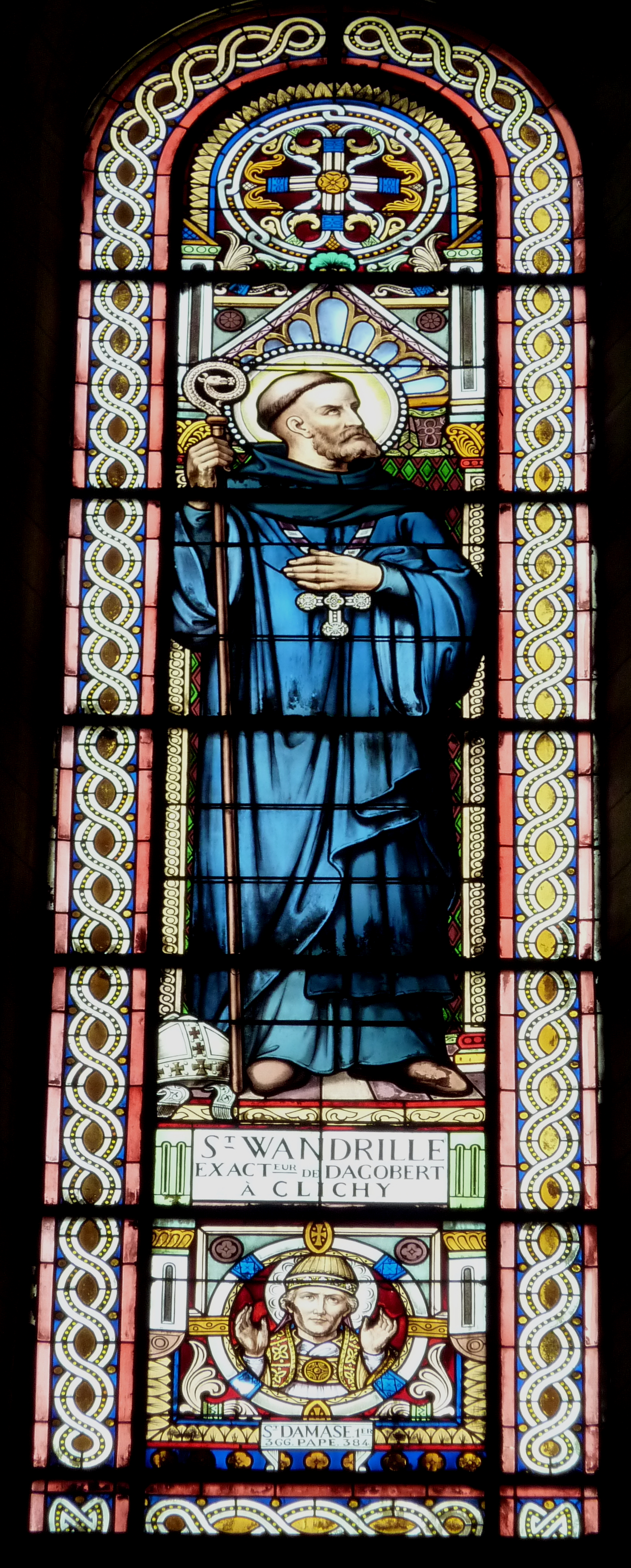
St. Wandregisel.

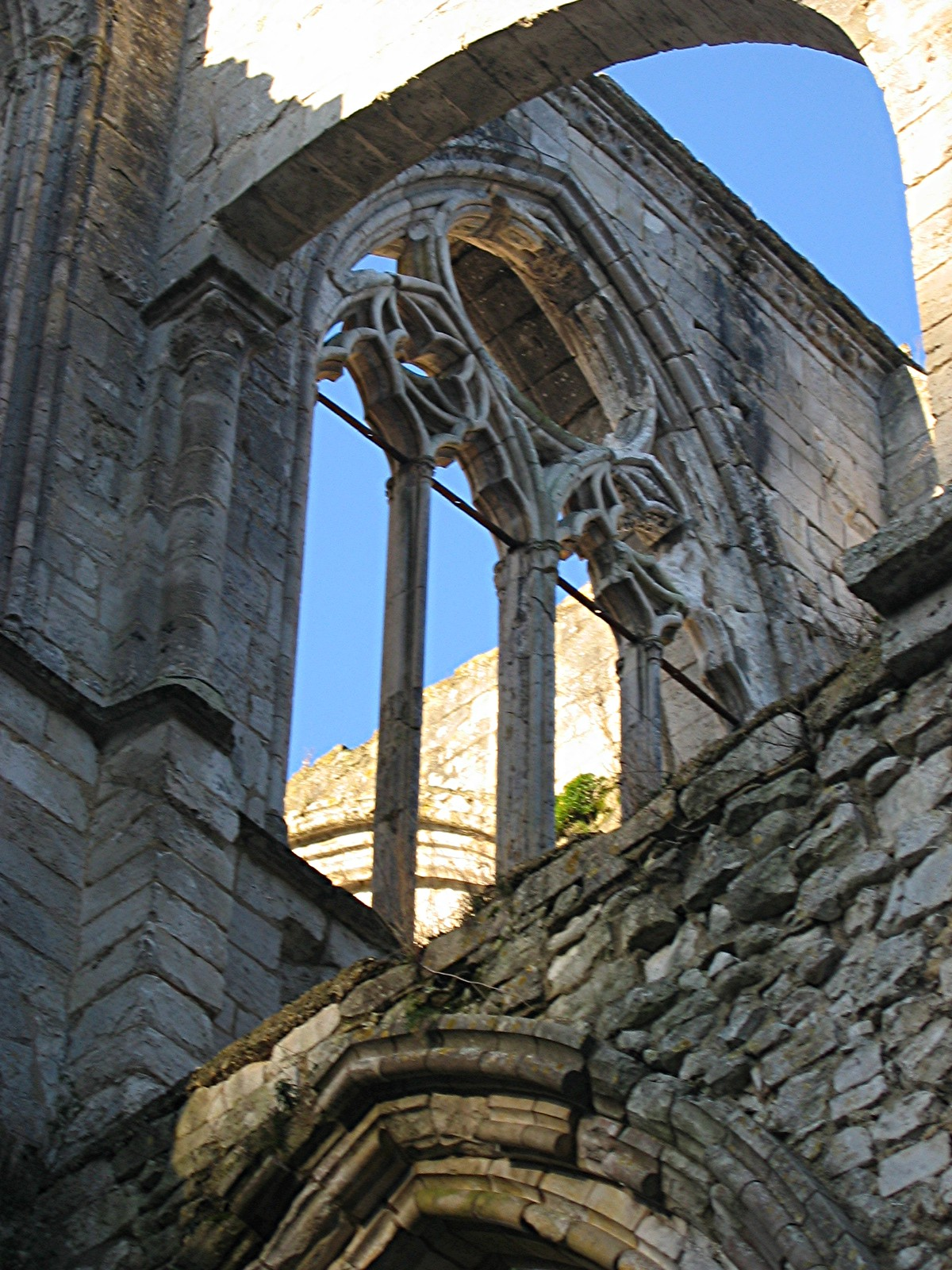
Abbey of Saint Wandrille (Fontenelle Abbey).

Virgin-martyr Markella of Chios.

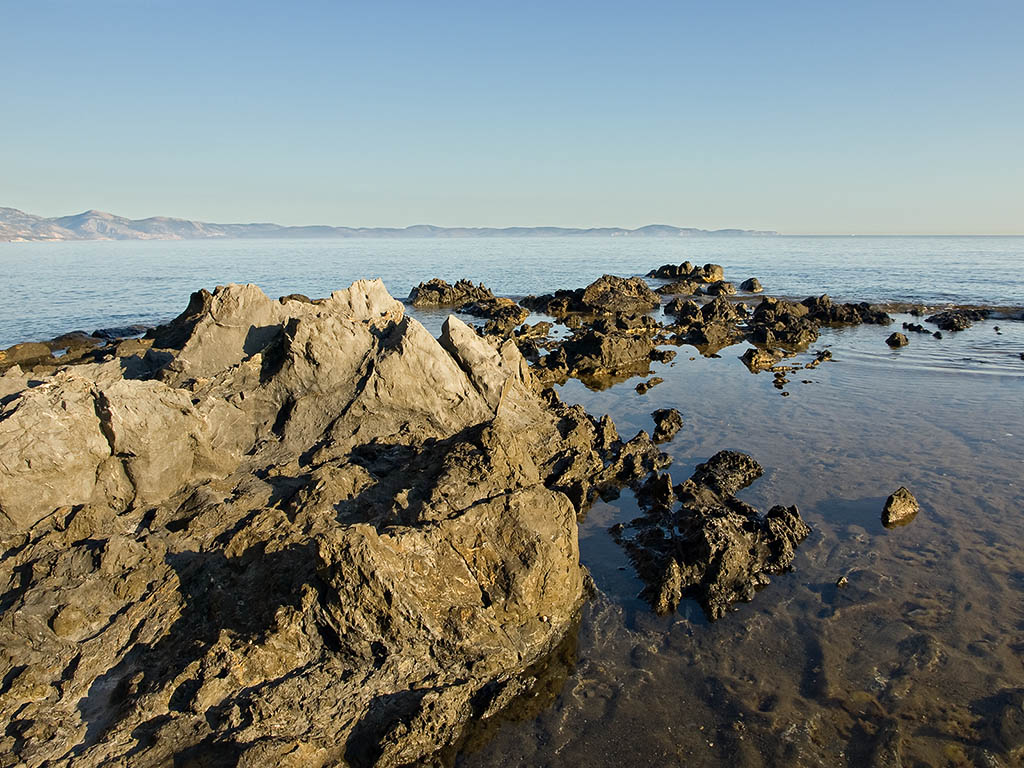
Site of the martyrdom of Virgin-martyr Markella of Chios.

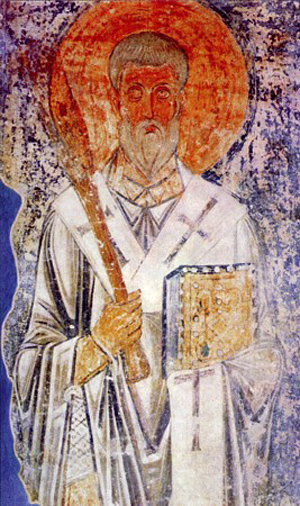
Hieromartyr Phocas, Bishop of Sinope.

== Sources ==
- July 22/August 4. Orthodox Calendar (PRAVOSLAVIE.RU).
- August 4 / July 22. HOLY TRINITY RUSSIAN ORTHODOX CHURCH (A parish of the Patriarchate of Moscow).
- July 22. OCA - The Lives of the Saints.
- July 22. The Year of Our Salvation - Holy Transfiguration Monastery, Brookline, Massachusetts.
- The Autonomous Orthodox Metropolia of Western Europe and the Americas (ROCOR). St. Hilarion Calendar of Saints for the year of our Lord 2004. St. Hilarion Press (Austin, TX). p. 54.
- The Twenty-Second Day of the Month of July. Orthodoxy in China.
- July 22. Latin Saints of the Orthodox Patriarchate of Rome.
- The Roman Martyrology. Transl. by the Archbishop of Baltimore. Last Edition, According to the Copy Printed at Rome in 1914. Revised Edition, with the Imprimatur of His Eminence Cardinal Gibbons. Baltimore: John Murphy Company, 1916. pp. 216–217.
- Rev. Richard Stanton. A Menology of England and Wales, or, Brief Memorials of the Ancient British and English Saints Arranged According to the Calendar, Together with the Martyrs of the 16th and 17th Centuries. London: Burns & Oates, 1892. pp. 351–352.

Greek Sources

- Great Synaxaristes: (in Greek) 22 ΙΟΥΛΙΟΥ. ΜΕΓΑΣ ΣΥΝΑΞΑΡΙΣΤΗΣ.
- (in Greek) Συναξαριστής. 22 Ιουλίου. ECCLESIA.GR. (H ΕΚΚΛΗΣΙΑ ΤΗΣ ΕΛΛΑΔΟΣ).
- (in Greek) 22/07/2026. Ορθόδοξος Συναξαριστής.

Russian Sources

- (in Russian) 4 августа (22 июля). Православная Энциклопедия под редакцией Патриарха Московского и всея Руси Кирилла (электронная версия). (Orthodox Encyclopedia - Pravenc.ru).
- (in Russian) 22 июля по старому стилю / 4 августа по новому стилю. СПЖ "Союз православных журналистов". 2026.
- (in Russian) 22 июля (ст.ст.) 4 августа 2026 (нов. ст.). Русская Православная Церковь Отдел внешних церковных связей. (DECR).
