= July 10 (Eastern Orthodox liturgics) =

Day in the Eastern Orthodox liturgical calendar

Eastern Orthodox liturgical calendar
July 9	July 10	July 11
July 10 O.S. ≍ July 23 N.S. July 10 N.S ≍ June 27 O.S.

An Eastern Orthodox cross

July 10 in Eastern Orthodox liturgical calendars is a feast day and a day of commemoration of saints and martyrs. Although some Orthodox churches use the Revised Julian Calendar and others use the traditional Julian calendar, the fixed commemorations for their respective July 10 are broadly the same, no matter which calendar is used. (Note: Despite the dates being the same, the days to which they refer typically differ by 13 days. The notation Old Style or O.S. is sometimes used to indicate a date in the traditional Julian Calendar (the "Old Calendar"). The notation New Style or N.S. indicates a date in the Revised Julian calendar (the "New Calendar").)

== Saints ==
- Holy 45 Martyrs at Nicopolis in Armenia (c. 319), including: (Note: "At Nicopolis, in Armenia, the holy martyrs Leontius, Mauritius, Daniel, and their companions, who after being tortured in different manners, were finally cast into the fire, and thus terminated their long martyrdom, in the time of the emperor Licinius and the governor Lysias.")

- Leontius, Maurice, Daniel, Anthony, Alexander, Anicetus, Sisinius, Meneus, Verelad, and Timothy.

- Martyr Apollonius of Sardis, Lydia, by crucifixion (3rd century) (Note: "At Iconium, St. Apollonius, martyr, who consummated his glorious martyrdom by death on the cross.")
- Martyr Tithoes.
- The Myriad (10,000) Venerable Fathers of the desert and caves of Nitria, martyred by the impious Patriarch Theophilus of Alexandria (c. 398)
- Martyrs Bianor and Silvanus (Silouan), of Pisidia (4th century) (Note: "In Pisidia, the holy martyrs Bianor and Silvanus, who merited an immortal crown by being decapitated, after enduring most bitter torments for the name of Christ."")
- Saint Athanasios the Pentaschoinitis, near Amathous, in Cyprus (7th century)

== Pre-Schism Western saints ==
- Saint Alexander, an early martyr in Rome (c. 150)
- Holy Seven Brothers, early martyrs in Rome: Januarius, Felix, Philip, Sylvanus, Alexander, Vitalis, and Martial, under Antoninus Pius (c. 150) (Note: "AT Rome, the martyrdom of the seven holy brothers, sons of the saintly martyr Felicitas, namely, Januarius, Felix, Philip, Sylvanus, Alexander, Vitalis, and Martial, in the time of the emperor Antoninus, under Publius, prefect of the city. Januarius, after being scourged with rods and detained in prison, died under the blows inflicted with leaded whips. Felix and Philip were scourged to death, Sylvanus was thrown headlong from an eminence. Alexander, Vitalis, and Martial were condemned to capital punishment.") (see also: January 25 - East )
- Saints Rufina and Secunda, two virgin-martyrs in Rome under Valerian, buried at Santa Rufina on the Aurelian Way (257) (Note: "Also, at Rome, in the persecution of Valerian and Gallienus, the holy virgins and martyrs Eufina and Secunda, sisters, who, after being subjected to torments, the one having her head split open, the other being decapitated, departed for heaven. Their bodies are kept with due honor in the Lateran Basilica, near the baptistery.")
- Saints Rufinus and Secundus, early martyrs buried on the Via Cornelia at the eleventh milestone from Rome.
- Saints Januarius, Marinus, Nabor and Felix, martyrs in North Africa. (Note: "In Africa, the holy martyrs Januarius, Marinus, Nabor, and Felix, who were beheaded.")
- Saint Etto of Fescau (Hetto of Dompierre-sur-Helpe), Abbot of St Peter's at Fescau in Belgium and also bishop (c. 670) (Note: See: (in French) Etton de Dompierre sur Helpe. Wikipédia. (French Wikipedia).)
- Saint Pascharius (Pasquier), Bishop of Nantes in France, who founded the monastery of Aindre (c. 680)
- Saint Amalberga of Maubeuge, a Merovingian nun (690) (Note: Born in Brabant in Belgium, she was married to and was the mother of Sts Gudula, Emebert and Reineldis. When Witger became a monk at Lobbes, she joined the convent at Maubeuge.)
- Saints Lantfrid, Waltram and Elilantus, three brothers who founded the Monastery of Benediktbeuren in Bavaria, Germany and succeeded one another as abbots (c. 770)
- Saint Amalberga of Temse, a nun at Munsterbilzen Abbey in Belgium (c. 772) (Note: Her relics were later transferred to the Monastery of St Peter in Ghent.)
- Saint Peter of Perugia (Peter Vincioli), founder of the monastery of San Pietro in Perugia (1007)

== Post-Schism Orthodox saints ==
- Venerable Anthony of the Caves, Founder of Monasticism in Russia (1073) (Note: MAGNIFICATION: "We magnify you, Venerable Father Anthony, and we honour your holy memory, Teacher of Monastics and Converser with the Angels." KONDAK, TONE 8: "Surrendering yourself to God whom you loved from your youth above all, you lovingly followed Him with your whole soul. Accounting the material things of the world as vanity, you made a cave in the earth and in it you struggled nobly against the snares of the invisible enemy. You illumined all the earth like a bright, radiant sun, and therefore you passed over, rejoicing, to the heavenly dwelling place. Standing now before the Throne of the Master together with the angels, remember us who honour your holy memory, that we may cry out to you: Rejoice, O Anthony, our venerable father.")
- Saint Gregory, Bishop of Assos near Ephesus (1150) (see also: 1st Sunday after November 10; March 4 )
- Venerable Silouan of the Far Caves in Kiev (13th-14th century)
- New Hieromartyr Archpriest Joseph of Damascus, and companions (1860)
- Saints Eumenius (1920) and Parthenius (1905), restorers of Koudouma Monastery on Crete.

=== New martyrs and confessors ===
- New Hieromartyrs Basil Pobedonostsev, Peter Zefirov and Stephen Lukanin, Priests (1918)
- New Hieromartyrs George Begma and Nestor Gudzovsky, Deacons (1918)

== Other commemorations ==
- The Placing of the Precious Robe of the Lord at Moscow (1625)
- "Konevits" Icon of the Most Holy Theotokos. (Note: See: (in Russian) Коневская икона Божией Матери. Википедии. (Russian Wikipedia).)
- Synaxis of the Saints of Vatopedi, Mount Athos.
- Synaxis of Saint John the Theologian in Beatus.

== Icon gallery ==
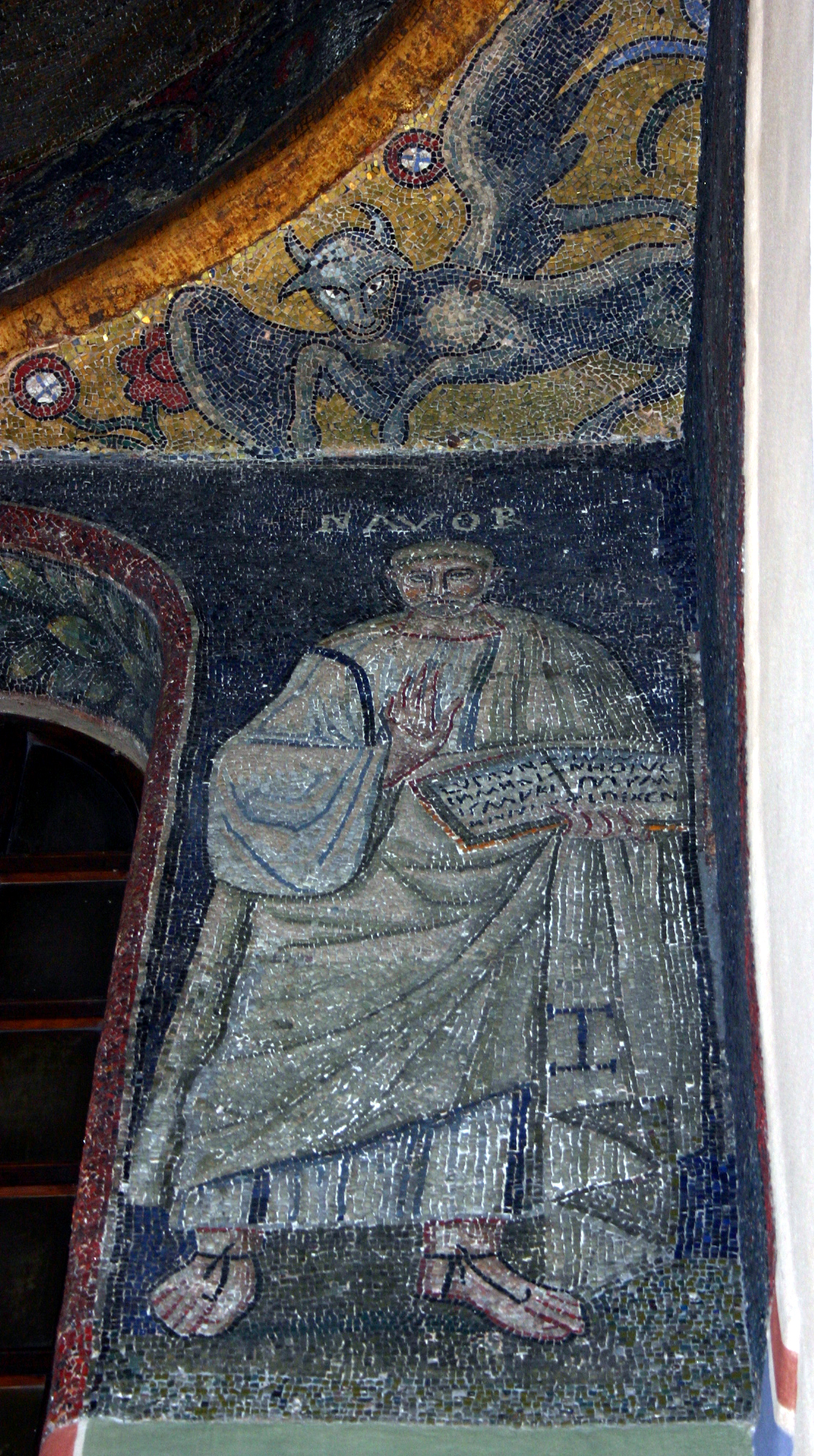
St. Nabor, martyr in North Africa.

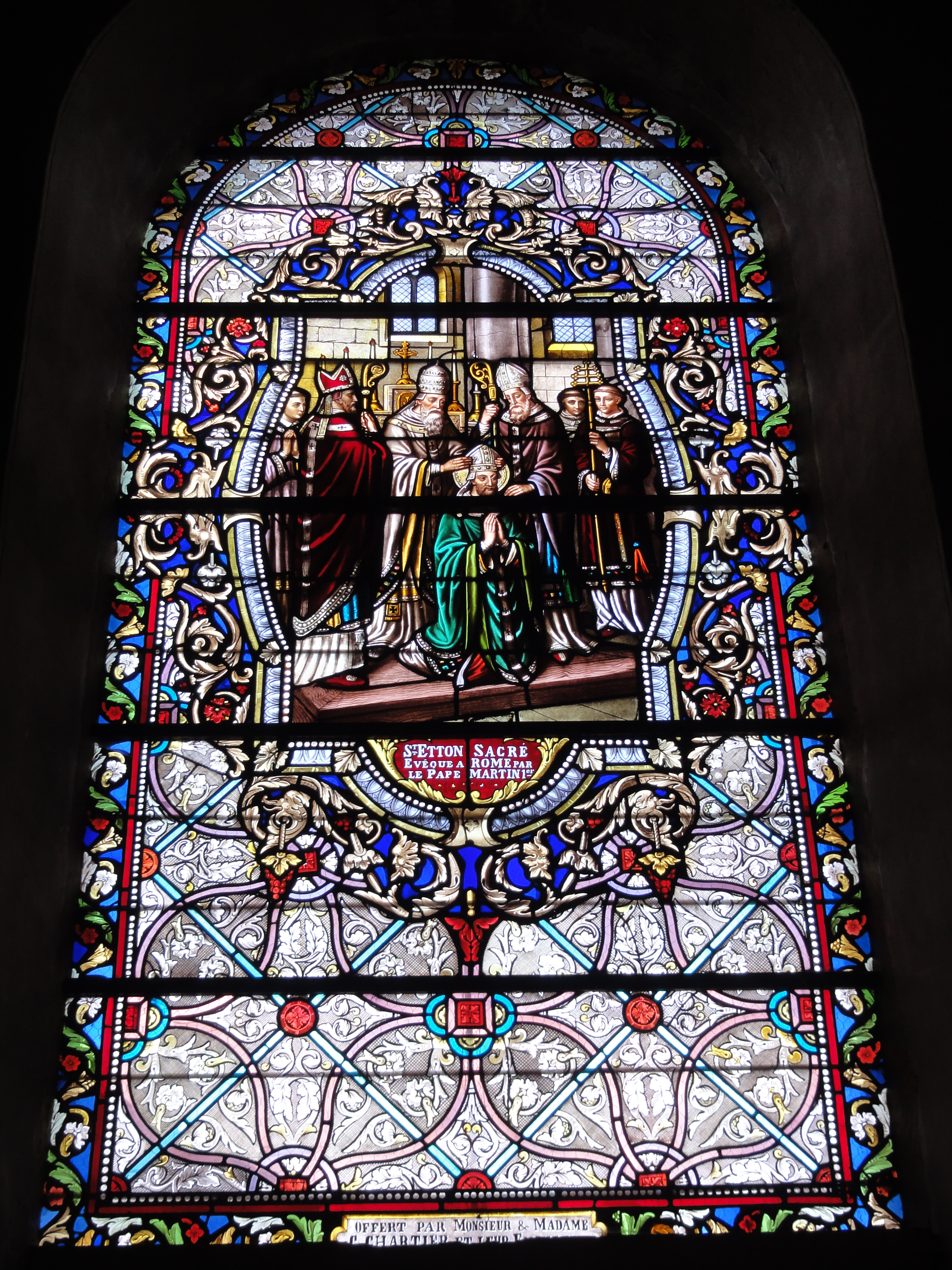
Ordination of St. Hetto of Dompierre-sur-Helpe as Bishop.

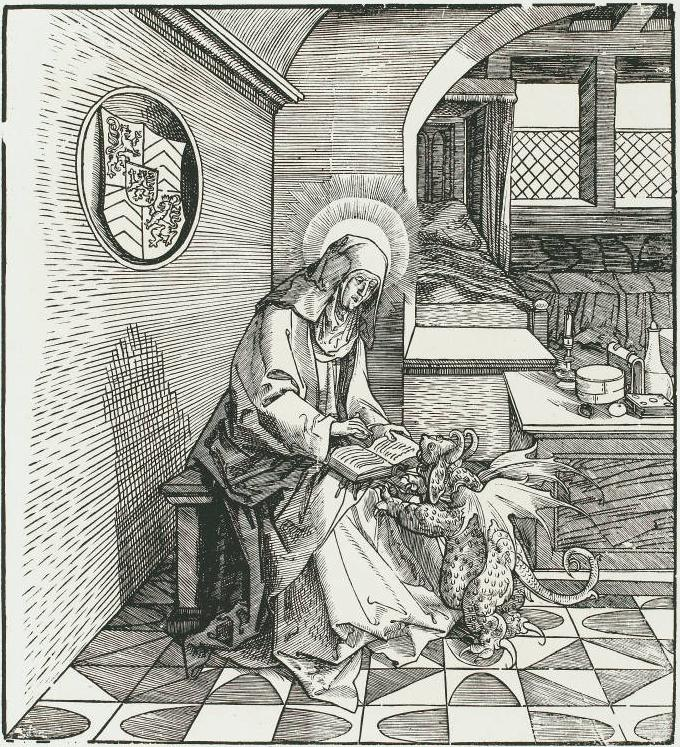
St. Amalberga of Maubeuge.

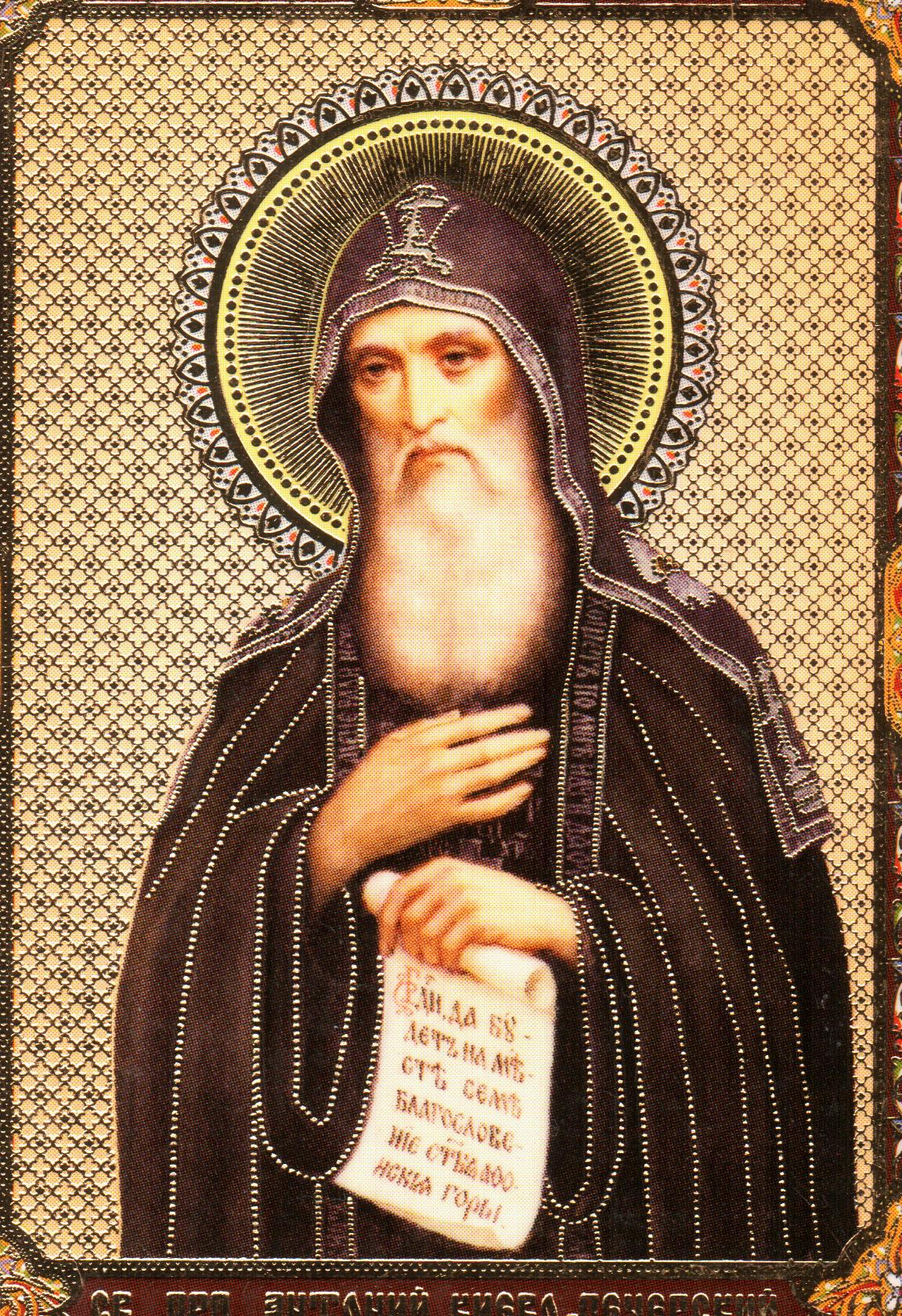
Venerable Anthony of the Caves.

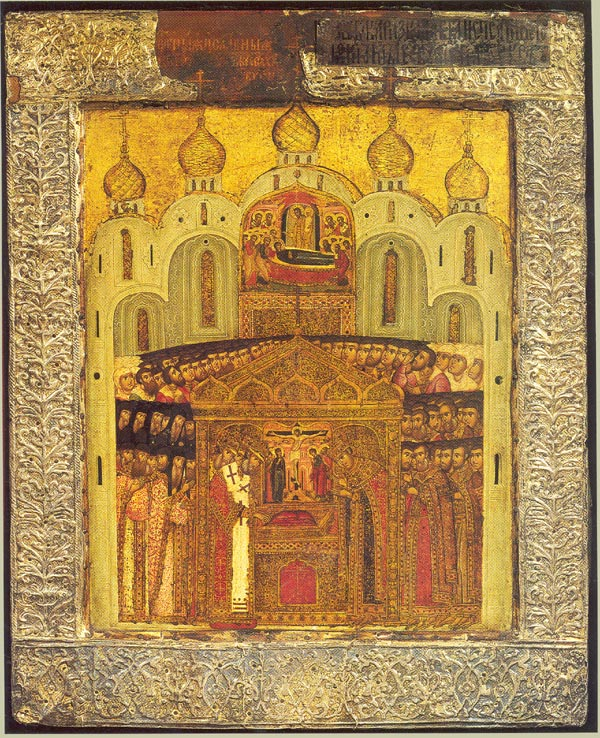
The Deposition of the Precious Robe of the Lord (Church of the Deposition of the Robe).

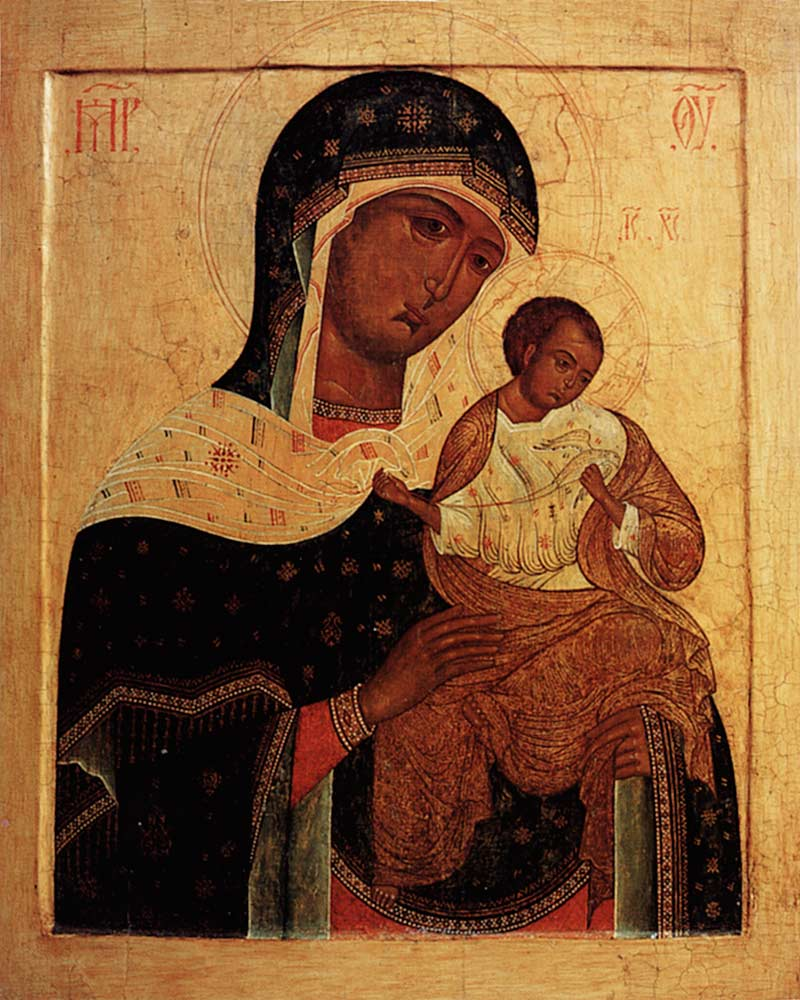
"Konevits" Icon of the Most Holy Theotokos.

== Sources ==
- July 10/July 23. Orthodox Calendar (PRAVOSLAVIE.RU).
- July 23 / July 10. HOLY TRINITY RUSSIAN ORTHODOX CHURCH (A parish of the Patriarchate of Moscow).
- July 10. OCA - The Lives of the Saints.
- July 10. The Year of Our Salvation - Holy Transfiguration Monastery, Brookline, Massachusetts.
- The Autonomous Orthodox Metropolia of Western Europe and the Americas (ROCOR). St. Hilarion Calendar of Saints for the year of our Lord 2004. St. Hilarion Press (Austin, TX). p. 51.
- The Tenth Day of the Month of July. Orthodoxy in China.
- July 10. Latin Saints of the Orthodox Patriarchate of Rome.
- The Roman Martyrology. Transl. by the Archbishop of Baltimore. Last Edition, According to the Copy Printed at Rome in 1914. Revised Edition, with the Imprimatur of His Eminence Cardinal Gibbons. Baltimore: John Murphy Company, 1916. pp. 202–203.
- Rev. Richard Stanton. A Menology of England and Wales, or, Brief Memorials of the Ancient British and English Saints Arranged According to the Calendar, Together with the Martyrs of the 16th and 17th Centuries. London: Burns & Oates, 1892. p. 329.

Greek Sources

- Great Synaxaristes: (in Greek) 10 ΙΟΥΛΙΟΥ. ΜΕΓΑΣ ΣΥΝΑΞΑΡΙΣΤΗΣ.
- (in Greek) Συναξαριστής. 10 Ιουλίου. ECCLESIA.GR. (H ΕΚΚΛΗΣΙΑ ΤΗΣ ΕΛΛΑΔΟΣ).
- (in Greek) ΙΟΥΛΙΟΣ. Αποστολική Διακονία της Εκκλησίας της Ελλάδος (Apostoliki Diakonia of the Church of Greece).
- (in Greek) 10/07/2018. Ορθόδοξος Συναξαριστής.

Russian Sources

- (in Russian) 23 июля (10 июля). Православная Энциклопедия под редакцией Патриарха Московского и всея Руси Кирилла (электронная версия). (Orthodox Encyclopedia - Pravenc.ru).
- (in Russian) 10 июля по старому стилю / 23 июля по новому стилю. СПЖ "Союз православных журналистов". 2018.
- (in Russian) 10 июля (ст.ст.) 23 июля 2014 (нов. ст.). Русская Православная Церковь Отдел внешних церковных связей. (DECR).
