= July 23 (Eastern Orthodox liturgics) =

Day in the Eastern Orthodox liturgical calendar

Eastern Orthodox liturgical calendar
July 22	July 23	July 24
July 23 O.S. ≍ August 5 N.S. July 23 N.S ≍ July 10 O.S.

An Eastern Orthodox cross

July 23 in Eastern Orthodox liturgical calendars is a feast day and a day of commemoration of saints and martyrs. Although some Orthodox churches use the Revised Julian Calendar and others use the traditional Julian calendar, the fixed commemorations for their respective July 23 are broadly the same, no matter which calendar is used. (Note: Despite the dates being the same, the days to which they refer typically differ by 13 days. The notation Old Style or O.S. is sometimes used to indicate a date in the traditional Julian Calendar (the "Old Calendar"). The notation New Style or N.S. indicates a date in the Revised Julian calendar (the "New Calendar").)

== Saints ==
- Righteous Hannah (Anna), mother of the Prophet Samuel (1100 BC) (see also: December 9)
- Prophet Ezekiel (6th century BC) (see also: July 21)
- Martyr Vitalius, at Ravenna (62)
- Hieromartyr Apollinaris, Bishop of Ravenna (c. 75) (Note: The first Bishop of Ravenna in Italy, he was tortured for the Orthodox Faith and died. The exact date is not known. His shrine is at the monastery of Classe in Ravenna.) (Note: "THE birthday of the holy bishop Apollinaris, who was consecrated at Rome by the apostle Peter, and sent to Ravenna, where he endured for the faith of Christ many different tribulations. He afterwards preached the Gospel in Æmilia, where he converted many from the worship of idols. Finally, returning to Ravenna, he terminated his confession of Christ by a glorious martyrdom under the Caesar Vespasian.")
- Hieromartyr Apollonius, at Rome (183) (Note: The entry in the Greek Synaxarion refers to him as "Hieromartyr Apollonius, the Bishop of Rome"; however there has never been a Pope of Rome with this name. The Parisian Codex 223 (Fonds Coislin) refers to him as a hieromartyr.)
- Martyrs Trophimus, Theophilus, and 13 others in Lycia (284-305) (Note: "The same day, the birthday of the holy martyrs Trophimus and Theophilus, who received their crown of martyrdom by being beaten with stones, scorched with fire, and finally struck with the sword, in the time of the emperor Diocletian.") (see also: July 21)
- The Holy 7 Martyrs at Carthage (or at Chaldia).
- Venerable Symeon of Emesa, Fool-for-Christ (590) (see also: July 21) with John
- The (250) Holy Martyrs tortured and killed in Bulgaria, during the reign of Nicephorus the Emperor (802-811) (Note: "In Bulgaria, many holy martyrs whom the impious emperor Nicephorus, whilst he was devastating the churches of God, put to death in various ways by the sword, the halter, arrows, long imprisonment, and starvation.")
- Venerable Anna of Leucadia (or Susanna) (c. 829-842 or 919)
- Saint Therissos (Thyrsos), Bishop of Karpasia in Cyprus. (see also: August 5)

== Pre-Schism Western saints ==
- Saints Apollonius and Eugene, early Roman martyrs, the former was pierced with arrows at the stake, the latter was beheaded.
- Saint Rasyphus, a martyr venerated in Rome from early times.
- Saint Liborius of Le Mans, Bishop of Le Mans in France from 348 to 390, he is the patron saint of Paderborn in Germany where his relics were moved in 836 (390) (Note: "At Le Mans, in France, St. Liborius, bishop and confessor.")
- Venerable John Cassian the Roman, Abbot of Monastery of St Victor, Marseille (435) (Note: Probably born in what is now Romania, he became a monk in Egypt and afterwards went to Marseilles in France, where he founded the monastery of St Victor and a convent, ruling both from Lérins. His Conferences and his Institutes are still read throughout the Orthodox world. He was an ardent advocate of the Orthodox teaching on free will and opposed what later became known as Augustianism.) (see also: February 29 - East)
- Saint Valerian, a monk at Lérins in the south of France who became Bishop of Cimiez (c. 460) (Note: He attended the Councils of Riez (439) and Vaison (442). Some of his homilies still exist.)
- Saints Rasyphus and Ravennus, born in Britain, they became hermits in the north of France and were martyred in Macé (5th century) (Note: "These servants of God, according to the tradition of the Church of Bayeux, were natives of Great Britain, driven from this country in consequence of their zeal for the Christian Faith, as it is conjectured, about the middle of the fifth century, at the time of the English invasion. They took refuge in a wood, now called Mace, near Seez, in Normandy, where they led a life of great austerity, clothed in skins, and nourished with wild roots. Their sanctity attracted many persons to their cell, which provoked the jealousy of the pagan governor of Neustria, who sent his satellites and caused them to be put to death. They were privately buried by the Christians in the forest; but after a time, the spot being miraculously discovered, a church was built over their sacred remains. At the period of the Norman invasion the relics were removed to St. Vedast, near Bayeux, and there remained until the eleventh century, when, in consequence of a divine revelation, the Bishop Hugh translated them to the Cathedral of Bayeux, where their festival was thenceforth observed with great solemnity. In the year 1562 the shrine was profaned, and the precious relics burned by the Calvinists.")
- Saints Romula, Redempta and Herundo, three holy virgins who lived as ascetics near the church of St Mary Major in Rome (c. 580) (Note: "At Rome, the saintly virgins Romula, Redempta, and Herundines, mentioned by pope St. Gregory in his writings.")
- Saint Vitalian, Pope of Rome from 657 to 672 (672) (Note: He was much troubled by Monothelitism. He consecrated Theodore of Tarsus as Archbishop of Canterbury in 668.)

== Post-Schism Orthodox saints ==
- Saint Pelagia of Tinos, nun, of Tinos (1834)
- Saint John Jacob the Chozebite, of Neamț (1960) (see also: August 5)

=== New martyrs and confessors ===
- New Hieromartyr Michael Troitsky, Priest, and Martyr Andrew Argunov (1938) (Note: See: (in Russian) Аргунов, Андрей Иванович. Википедии. (Russian Wikipedia).)
- New Hieromartyr Nectarius (Trezvinsky), Bishop of Yaransk.

== Other commemorations ==
- Translation of the relics (403-404) of Hieromartyr Phocas, Bishop of Sinope (117) (see also: July 22)
- Synaxis of the Holy Prophet and Baptist John, in the district of Olympus, by Saint Thomas.
- Commemoration of the Miraculous Appearance of the Mother of God at Pochaev Lavra, which saved the monastery from the assault of the Tatars and Turks (1675)
- Icon of the Most Holy Theotokos "Pochaev" (1675)
- Icon of the Most Holy Theotokos "The Joy of All Who Sorrow" (with coins) of St. Petersburg (1888)
- Translation of the Relics (2000) of St. Herman (Germanus), Archbishop of Kazan (1567) to Sviyazhsk.
- Glorification (2001) of St. Theodore Ushakov, Admiral of the Russian Navy.

== Icon gallery ==
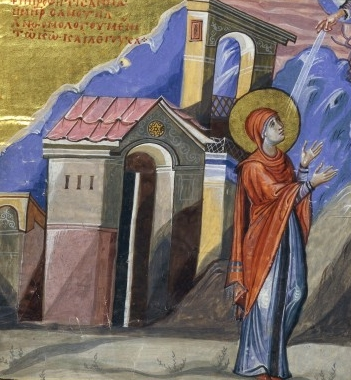
Righteous Hannah (Anna), mother of the Prophet Samuel.

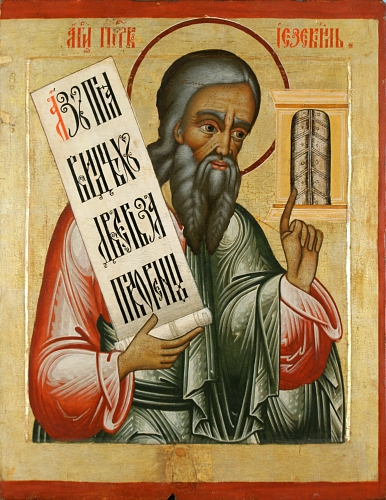
Prophet Ezekiel.

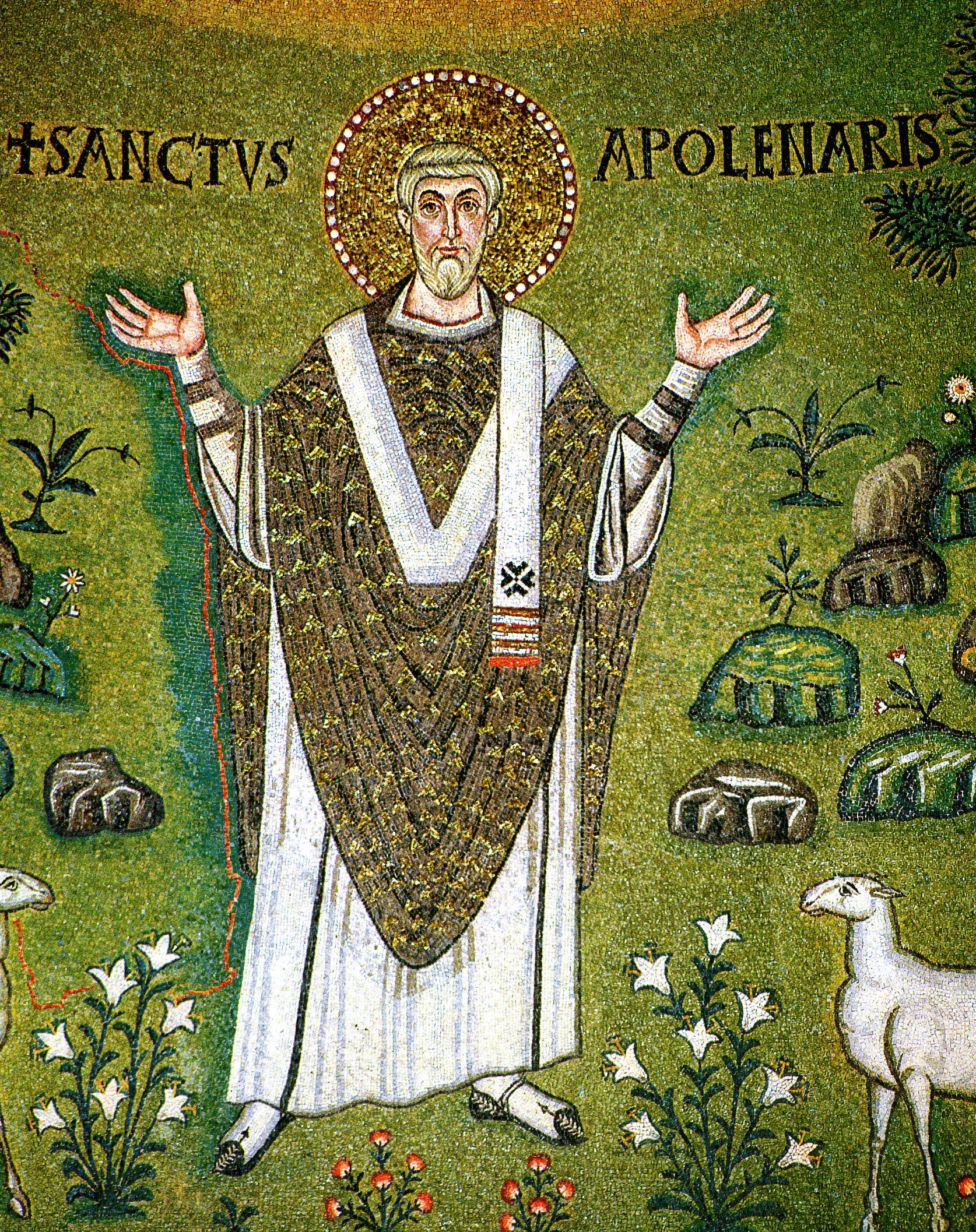
Hieromartyr Apollinaris, Bishop of Ravenna.

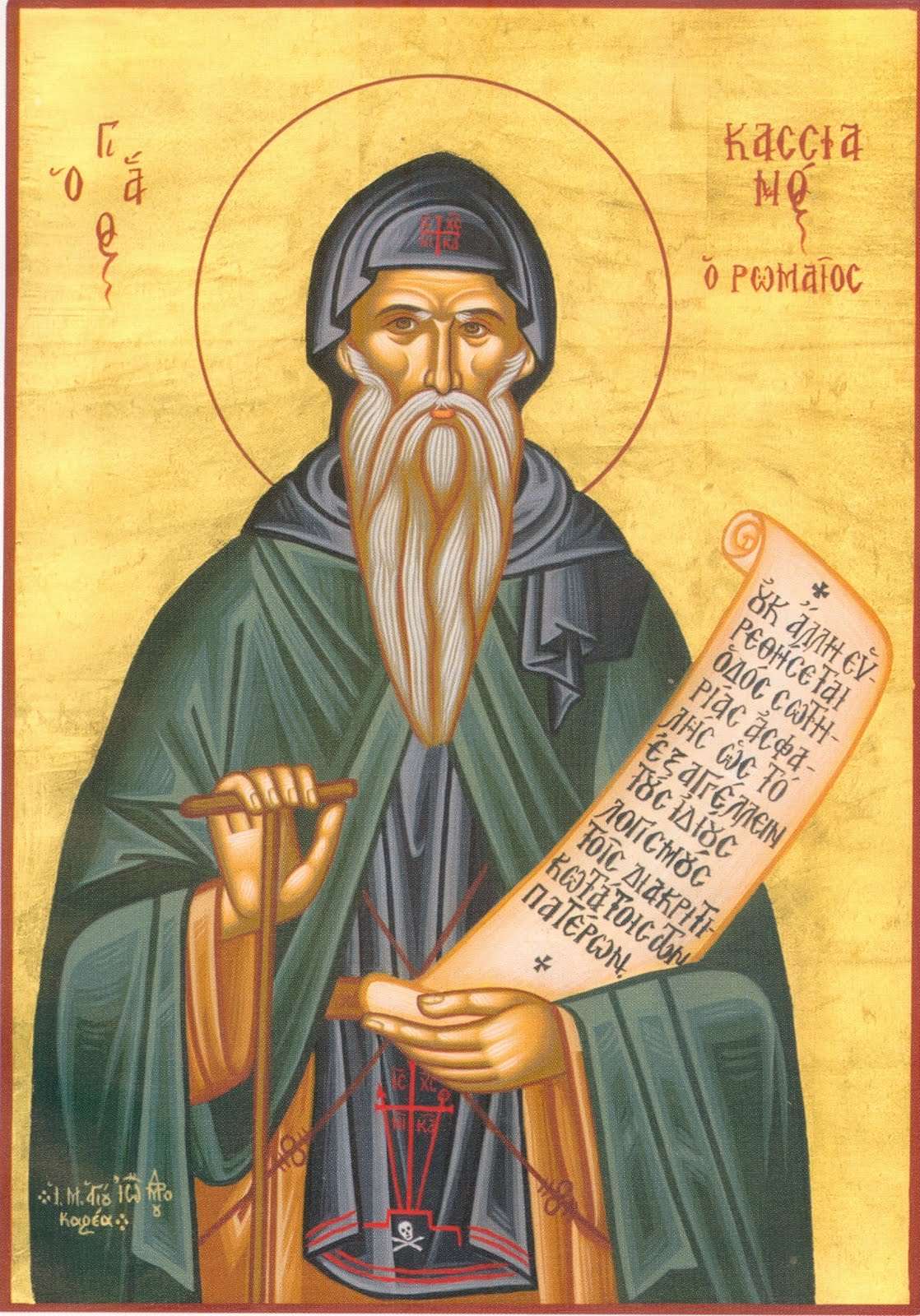
Venerable John Cassian the Roman, Abbot of Monastery of St Victor, Marseille.

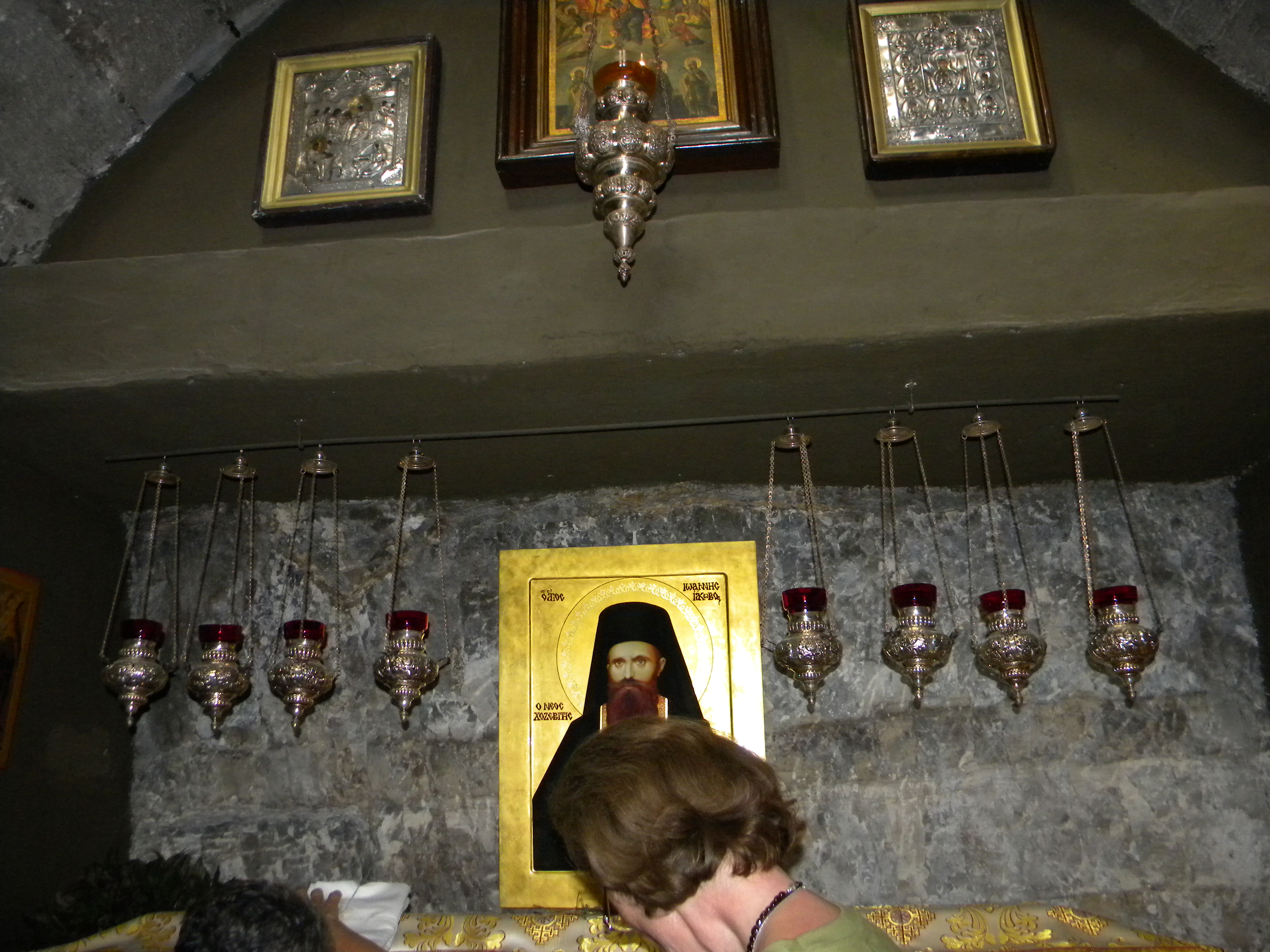
Relics of St. John Jacob the Chozebite, of Neamț, (St. George's Monastery, West Bank).

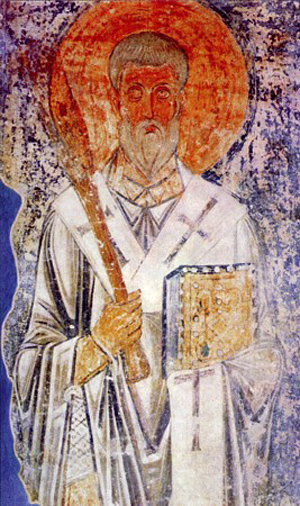
Hieromartyr Phocas, Bishop of Sinope.

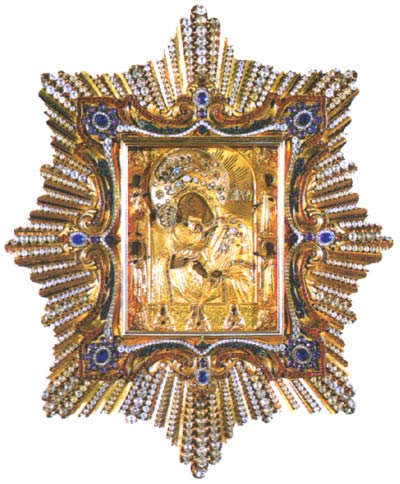
Icon of the Most Holy Theotokos "Pochaev".

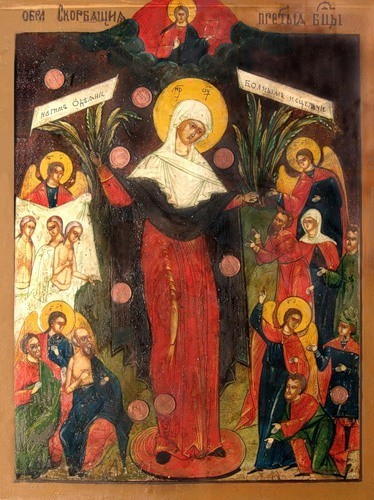
Icon of the Most Holy Theotokos "The Joy of All Who Sorrow" (with coins) of St. Petersburg (original icon).

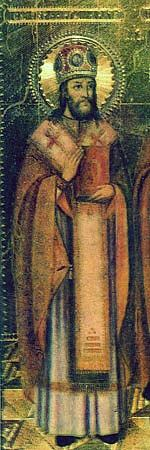
St. Germanus, Archbishop of Kazan.

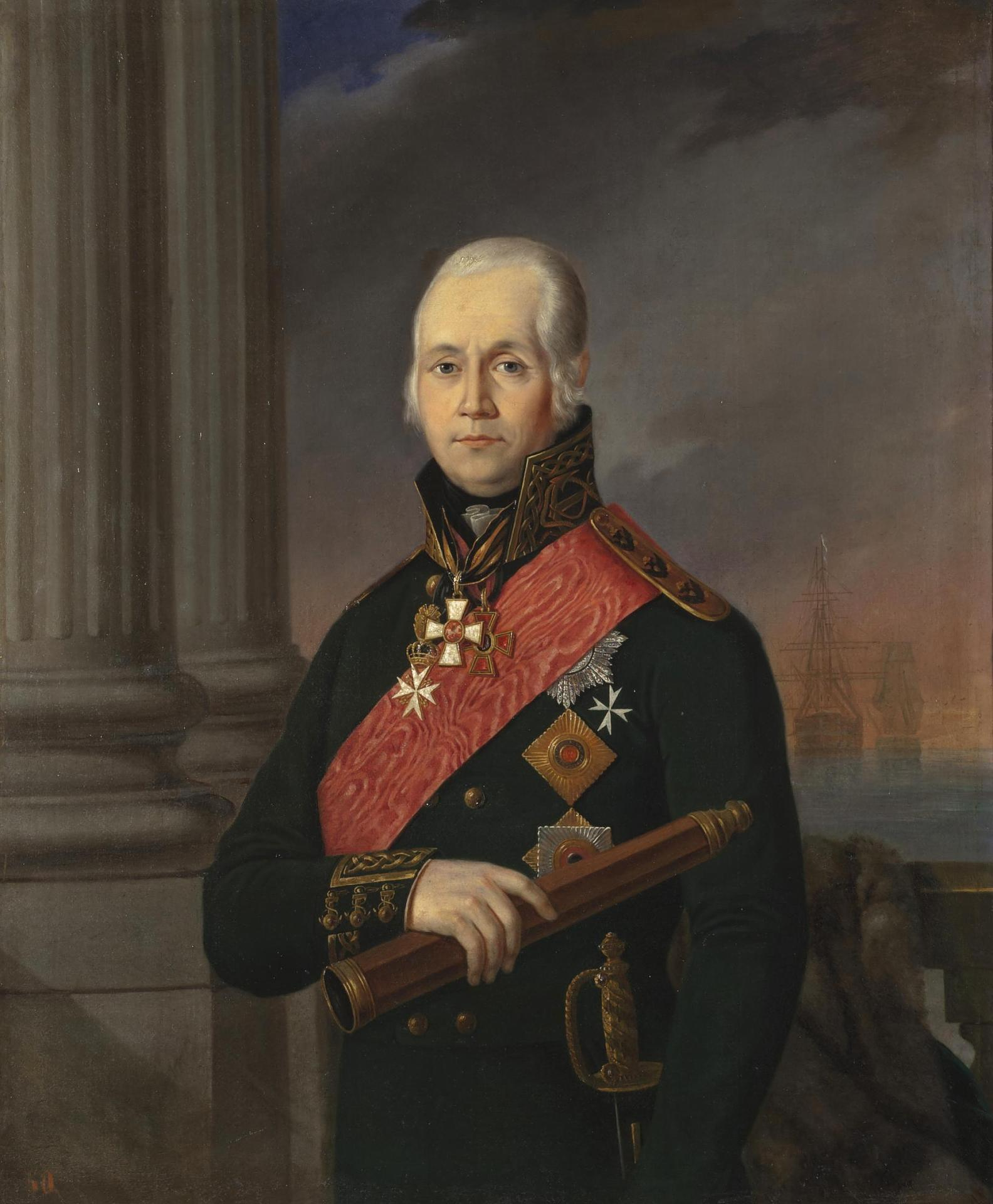
St. Theodore Ushakov.

== Sources ==
- July 23/August 5. Orthodox Calendar (PRAVOSLAVIE.RU).
- August 5 / July 23. HOLY TRINITY RUSSIAN ORTHODOX CHURCH (A parish of the Patriarchate of Moscow).
- July 23. OCA - The Lives of the Saints.
- July 23. The Year of Our Salvation - Holy Transfiguration Monastery, Brookline, Massachusetts.
- The Autonomous Orthodox Metropolia of Western Europe and the Americas (ROCOR). St. Hilarion Calendar of Saints for the year of our Lord 2004. St. Hilarion Press (Austin, TX). p. 54.
- The Twenty-Third Day of the Month of July. Orthodoxy in China.
- July 23. Latin Saints of the Orthodox Patriarchate of Rome.
- The Roman Martyrology. Transl. by the Archbishop of Baltimore. Last Edition, According to the Copy Printed at Rome in 1914. Revised Edition, with the Imprimatur of His Eminence Cardinal Gibbons. Baltimore: John Murphy Company, 1916. pp. 217–218.
- Rev. Richard Stanton. A Menology of England and Wales, or, Brief Memorials of the Ancient British and English Saints Arranged According to the Calendar, Together with the Martyrs of the 16th and 17th Centuries. London: Burns & Oates, 1892. pp. 352–353.

Greek Sources

- Great Synaxaristes: (in Greek) 23 ΙΟΥΛΙΟΥ. ΜΕΓΑΣ ΣΥΝΑΞΑΡΙΣΤΗΣ.
- (in Greek) Συναξαριστής. 23 Ιουλίου. ECCLESIA.GR. (H ΕΚΚΛΗΣΙΑ ΤΗΣ ΕΛΛΑΔΟΣ).
- (in Greek) 23/07/2026. Ορθόδοξος Συναξαριστής.

Russian Sources

- (in Russian) 5 августа (23 июля). Православная Энциклопедия под редакцией Патриарха Московского и всея Руси Кирилла (электронная версия). (Orthodox Encyclopedia - Pravenc.ru).
- (in Russian) 23 июля по старому стилю / 5 августа по новому стилю. СПЖ "Союз православных журналистов". 2026.
- (in Russian) 23 июля (ст.ст.) 5 августа 2026 (нов. ст.). Русская Православная Церковь Отдел внешних церковных связей. (DECR).
