= July 21 (Eastern Orthodox liturgics) =

Day in the Eastern Orthodox liturgical calendar

Eastern Orthodox liturgical calendar
| July 20 | July 21 | July 22 |
July 21 O.S. ≍ August 3 N.S. July 21 N.S ≍ July 8 O.S.

An Eastern Orthodox cross

July 21 in Eastern Orthodox liturgical calendars is a feast day and a day of commemoration of saints and martyrs. Although some Orthodox churches use the Revised Julian Calendar and others use the traditional Julian calendar, the fixed commemorations for their respective July 21 are broadly the same, no matter which calendar is used. (Note: Despite the dates being the same, the days to which they refer typically differ by 13 days. The notation Old Style or O.S. is sometimes used to indicate a date in the traditional Julian Calendar (the "Old Calendar"). The notation New Style or N.S. indicates a date in the Revised Julian calendar (the "New Calendar").)

== Saints ==
- Prophet Ezekiel (6th century BC) (Note: Russian use only - see also: July 23)
- Hieromartyr Zoticus, Bishop of Comana in Armenia (204) (Note: "At Comana, in Armenia, the holy bishop and martyr Zoticus, who was crowned under Severus.")
- Martyrs Theophilus, Trophimus and another 13 martyrs with them (305) (see also: July 23)
- Martyrs Justus and Matthew, and Eugene, at Rome (305)
- Martyrs Theodore and George.
- Holy 3 Martyrs of Melitene, dragged to death.
- Hieromartyr Bargabdesian, Deacon, at Arbela in Assyria (354)
- Saints Paul, Bishop, and John, Priest, ascetics, near Edessa (5th century)
- Venerable Symeon of Emesa, Fool-for-Christ (590), and his fellow ascetic St. John (c. 590) (Note: "In Syria, the holy monk John, a companion of St. Simeon.") (see also: July 23)

== Pre-Schism Western saints ==
- Saint Praxedes, the daughter of the Roman senator Pudens and sister of St Pudentiana (2nd century) (Note: "AT Rome, the holy virgin Praxedes, who was brought up in all chastity and in the knowledge of the divine law. Assiduously attending to watching, prayer and fasting, she rested in Christ, and was buried near her sister Pudentiana, on the Salarian road." One of the ancient churches in Rome is dedicated to her.)
- Saint Julia of Troyes (c. 272) (Note: Born in Troyes in France, she was seized by soldiers of the Emperor Aurelian after his victory over the usurper Tetricus. Committed to the charge of an officer called Claudius, she converted him to Christ and both were beheaded in Troyes under the same Aurelian.) (Note: "At Troyes, St. Julia, virgin and martyr.")
- Saints Claudius, Justus, Jucundinus and Companions, a group of eight martyrs, who suffered with St Julia in Troyes in France under Aurelian (273) (Note: Their relics were enshrined in the convent of Jouarre near Meaux.)
- Martyr Victor of Marseilles, and soldiers Alexander, Felician and Longinus (c. 290) (Note: Victor, an army officer in Marseilles in France, suffered martyrdom there with three prison-guards whom he had converted. In the fourth century St John Cassian built a monastery over their tomb which afterwards became the Monastery of St Victor.) (Note: "At Marseilles, the birthday of St. Victor, a soldier. Because he refused to serve in the army and sacrifice to idols, he was thrust into prison, where he was visited by an angel, then subjected to various torments, and finally being crushed under a millstone, he ended his martyrdom. With him also suffered three soldiers, Alexander, Felician, and Longinus.")
- Saint Constantine, a disciple and the first successor of St Benedict at Monte Cassino in Italy (c. 560)
- Saint Arbogast, 7th-century missionary to the Frankish Empire and an early Bishop of Strasbourg (c. 678) (Note: Born in Aquitaine in France, he was a hermit in Alsace when King Dagobert II forced him to become Bishop of Strasbourg, where he showed great humility and wisdom. At his own request he was buried in the place set apart for the burial of criminals. A church was soon built over his tomb.) (Note: "At Strasburg, St. Arbogastus, a bishop, renowned for miracles.")
- Saints John and Benignus, twin brothers and monks at Moyenmoutier in France (707)
- Saint Wastrada, the mother of St Gregory of Utrecht, she became a nun at the end of her life (c. 760) (Note: She was buried at Susteren Abbey.)

== Post-Schism Orthodox saints ==
- Venerable Onuphrius the Silent, of the Kiev Caves (12th century) (Note: See: (in Russian) Онуфрий Молчаливый. Википедии. (Russian Wikipedia).)
- Venerable Onisim of the Caves, recluse of the Kiev Caves Monastery (12th-13th century)
- Venerable Manuel II Palaiologos (Matthew in monasticism) (1425)
- Venerable Raphael (1640-1645) and Parthenius (1660) of Old Agapia Monastery, Romania.
- Saint Parthenius of Radobysdio, Arta, Bishop (1777)
- Ethno-Hieromartyr Meletios (Kyriakos), Bishop of Kitros (1821) (Note: See: (in Greek) Μελέτιος Α' Κίτρους. Βικιπαίδεια. (Greek Wikipedia).)

=== New martyrs and confessors ===
- New Hieromartyr Peter Golubev, Priest (1938)
- New Hieromartyrs Simo Banjac and Milan Stojisavljevic, and the latter’s son Martyr Milan of Glamoc, Serbia (1941-1945) (Note: See: (in Serbian) Списак светитеља Српске православне цркве: Симо Бањац (1871-1941).; Мирко Стојисављевић (1885-1941).)

== Other commemorations ==
- Synaxis of Icon of the Most Holy Theotokos of "Armatia", Constantinople. (see also: August 17)
- Synaxis of Saint Eleutherius, Bishop of Illyricum, in the Church by "Dry Hill".
- Synaxis of the holy martyr Acacius of Cappadocia, in Heptascalon. (see also: May 7)
- Uncovering of the relics (1649) of St. Anna of Kashin, Princess of Kashin (Euphrosyne in monasticism) (1337) (see also: October 2, June 12)
- Uncovering of the relics (1999) of New Hiero-confessor Roman Medved of Moscow, Archpriest (1937) (Note: See: (in Russian) Медведь, Роман Иванович. Википедии. (Russian Wikipedia).) (see also: August 26)
- Repose of Abbess Arsenia (Sebryakova) of the Ust-Medveditsk Convent (ru) (1905) (Note: See: (in Russian) Арсения (Себрякова). Википедии. (Russian Wikipedia).)
- Repose of Abbot Gerasim of the Chudov Monastery (1911)
- Repose of Blessed Anthony Petrovich Shuvalov, wonderworker of Undor-Simbirsk (1942) (Note: (in Russian) Старец Антоний Ундоровский - Антон Петрович Шувалов (1870−1942).)
- Repose of Abbess Euphemia of the Ravanica and St. Petka monasteries, Serbia (1958)

== Icon gallery ==
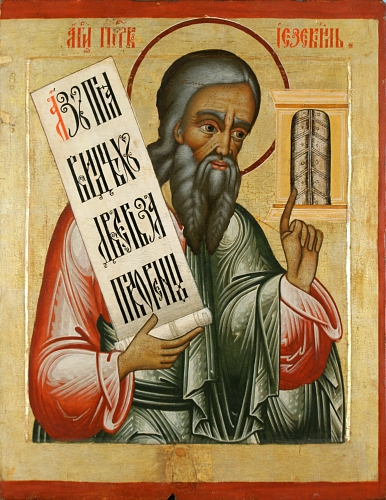
Prophet Ezekiel.

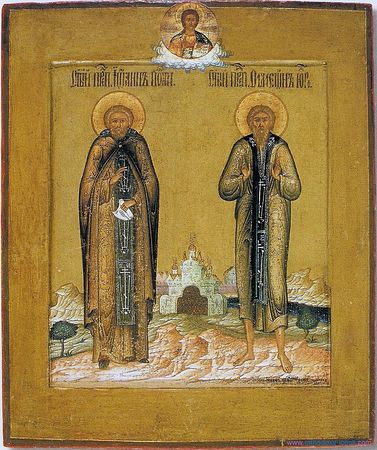
Venerable Symeon of Emesa and his fellow faster St. John.

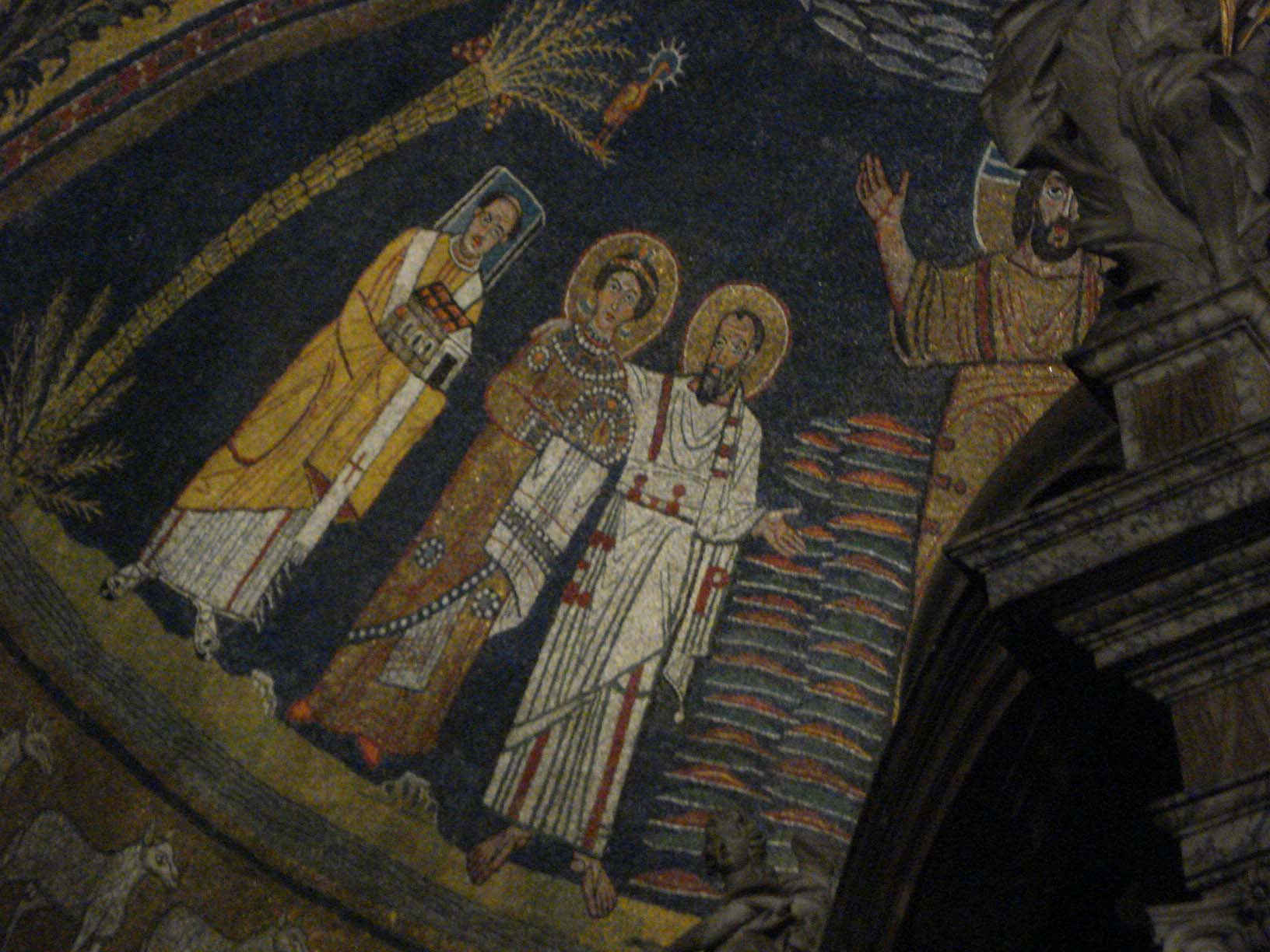
St. Praxedes, with Pope Paschal I and the Apostle Paul.

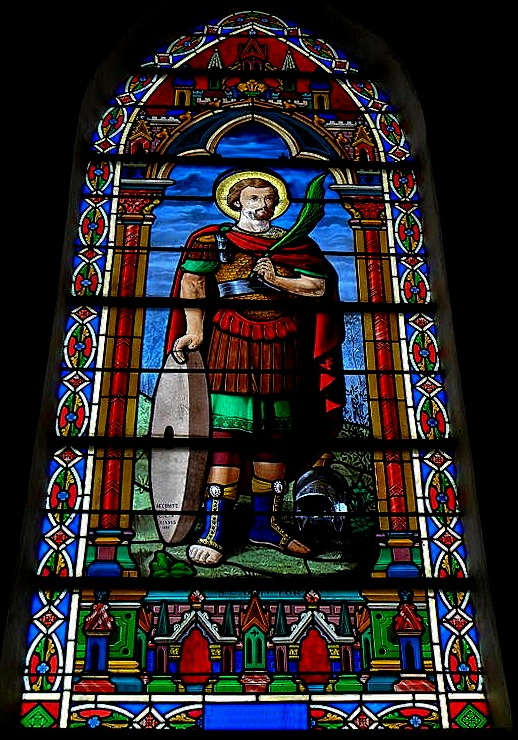
Martyr Victor of Marseilles.

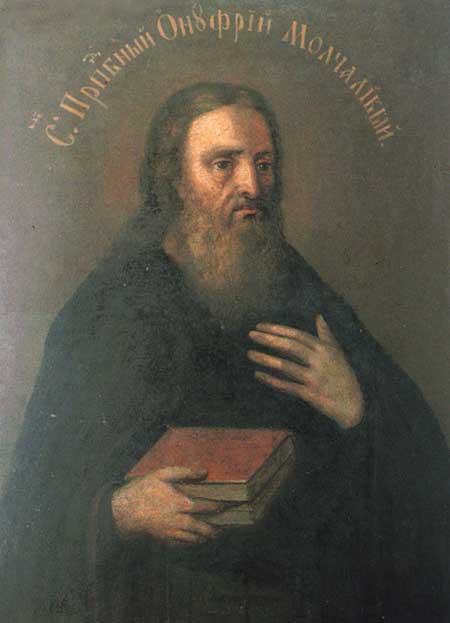
Venerable Onuphrius the Silent, of the Kiev Caves.

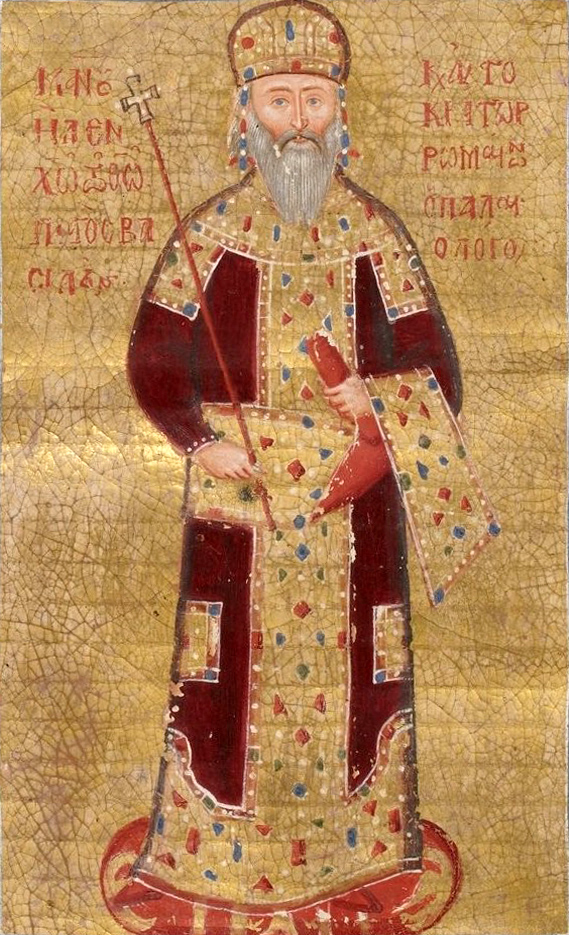
Byzantine Emperor Manuel II Palaiologos (Matthew in monasticism).

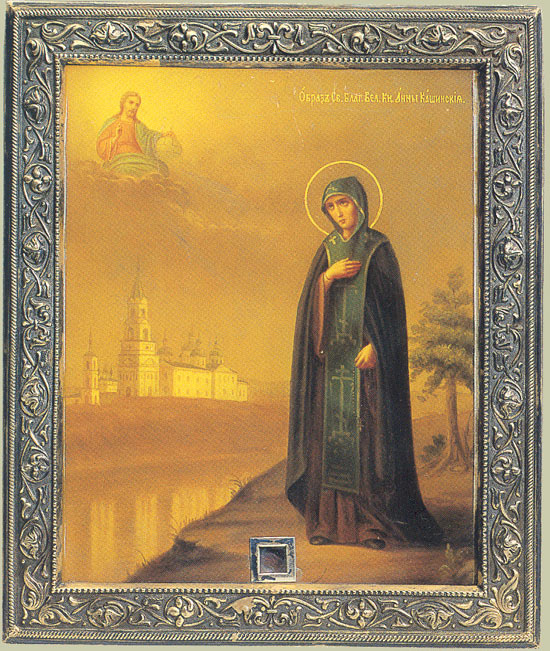
St. Anna of Kashin (Euphrosyne in monasticism).

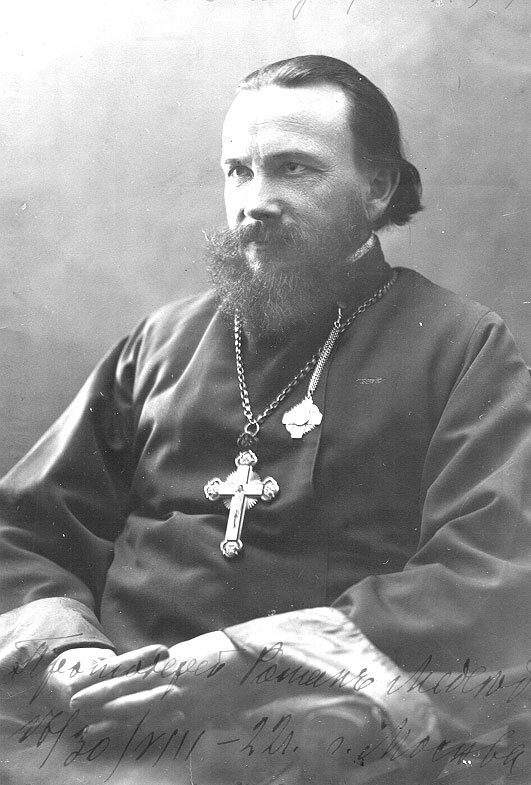
New Hiero-confessor Roman Medved of Moscow, Archpriest.

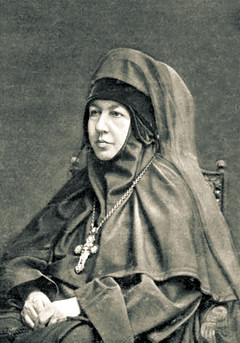
Abbess Arsenia (Sebryakova) of the Ust-Medveditsk Convent.

== Sources ==
- July 21/August 3. Orthodox Calendar (PRAVOSLAVIE.RU).
- August 3 / July 21. HOLY TRINITY RUSSIAN ORTHODOX CHURCH (A parish of the Patriarchate of Moscow).
- July 21. OCA - The Lives of the Saints.
- July 21. The Year of Our Salvation - Holy Transfiguration Monastery, Brookline, Massachusetts.
- The Autonomous Orthodox Metropolia of Western Europe and the Americas (ROCOR). St. Hilarion Calendar of Saints for the year of our Lord 2004. St. Hilarion Press (Austin, TX). p. 54.
- The Twenty-First Day of the Month of July. Orthodoxy in China.
- July 21. Latin Saints of the Orthodox Patriarchate of Rome.
- The Roman Martyrology. Transl. by the Archbishop of Baltimore. Last Edition, According to the Copy Printed at Rome in 1914. Revised Edition, with the Imprimatur of His Eminence Cardinal Gibbons. Baltimore: John Murphy Company, 1916. pp. 215–216.
- Rev. Richard Stanton. A Menology of England and Wales, or, Brief Memorials of the Ancient British and English Saints Arranged According to the Calendar, Together with the Martyrs of the 16th and 17th Centuries. London: Burns & Oates, 1892. pp. 349–351.

Greek Sources

- Great Synaxaristes: (in Greek) 21 ΙΟΥΛΙΟΥ. ΜΕΓΑΣ ΣΥΝΑΞΑΡΙΣΤΗΣ.
- (in Greek) Συναξαριστής. 21 Ιουλίου. ECCLESIA.GR. (H ΕΚΚΛΗΣΙΑ ΤΗΣ ΕΛΛΑΔΟΣ).
- (in Greek) 21/07/2026. Ορθόδοξος Συναξαριστής.

Russian Sources

- (in Russian) 3 августа (21 июля). Православная Энциклопедия под редакцией Патриарха Московского и всея Руси Кирилла (электронная версия). (Orthodox Encyclopedia - Pravenc.ru).
- (in Russian) 21 июля по старому стилю / 3 августа по новому стилю. СПЖ "Союз православных журналистов". 2026.
- (in Russian) 21 июля (ст.ст.) 3 августа 2026 (нов. ст.). Русская Православная Церковь Отдел внешних церковных связей. (DECR).
