= Eusignius of Antioch =

Roman soldier and Christian martyr (252–362)

Saint Eusignius
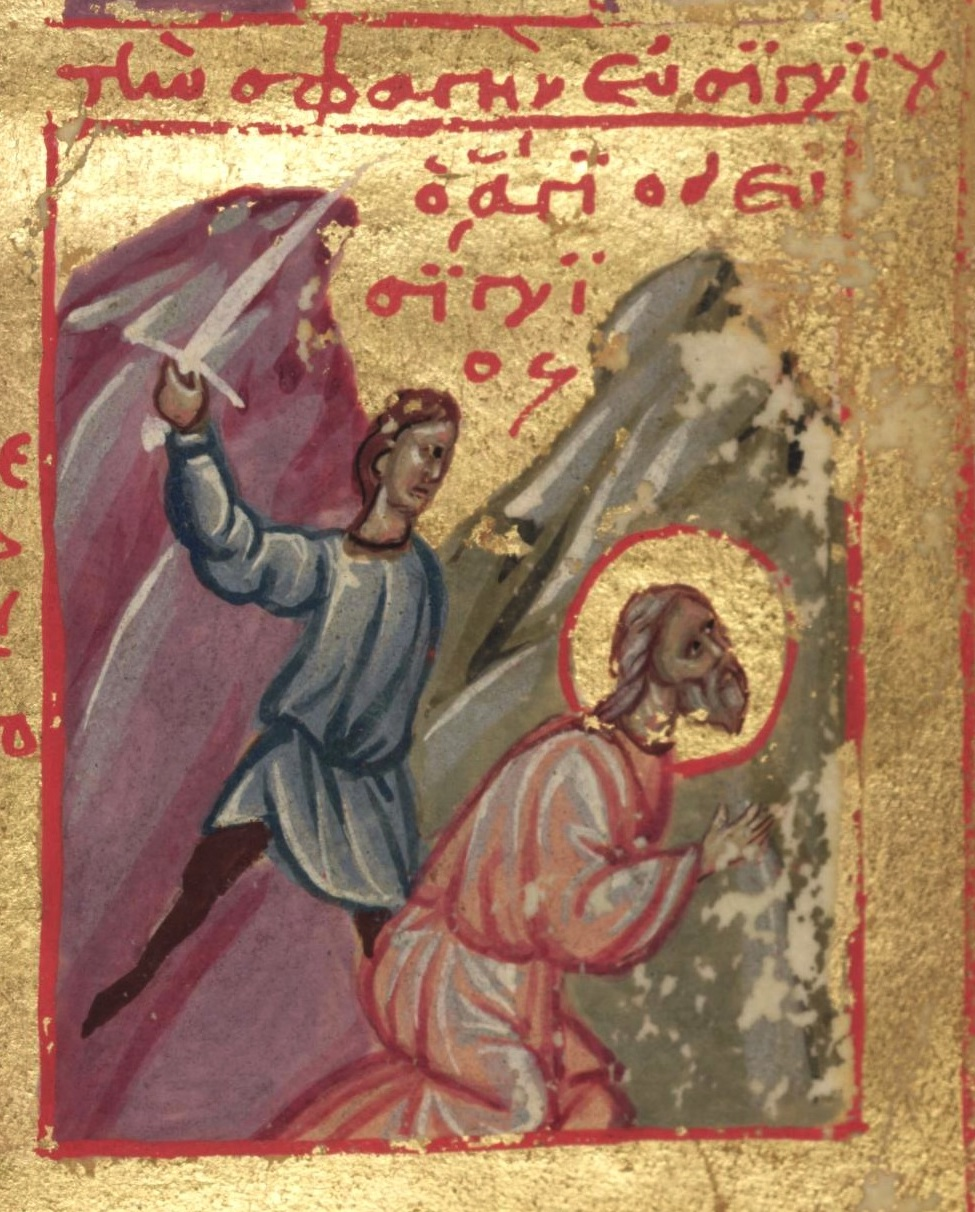

Martyr
- Born: 252; Antioch
- Died: 362 (aged 109–110); Antioch
- Venerated in: Roman Catholic Church, Eastern Orthodox Church
- Canonized: Pre-Congregation
- Feast: 5 August

Eusignius (also spelled Eusignios; 252 – 362) was a Roman soldier venerated as a martyr and saint. According to his hagiography he was born at Antioch and served in the imperial armies for about sixty years, beginning his career under the emperor Maximian and continuing through the reigns of Constantius Chlorus, Constantine the Great, and Constantine's sons. Early in Constantine's reign he was a witness to the appearance of the Cross in the sky that was understood as a sign of coming victory.

Eusignius was a companion of the martyr Basiliscus and is said to have witnessed his martyrdom, at which he beheld angels and Christ receiving the saint into heaven; he afterward gave an account of it.

In his old age Eusignius retired from military service and returned to Antioch, where he devoted himself to prayer, fasting, and the worship of the Church. He lived in this way into the reign of Julian the Apostate (361–363), who sought to restore paganism. After a fellow townsman, angered by a judgment Eusignius had given in a dispute, denounced him to the emperor as a Christian, he was summoned before Julian in 362. Eusignius openly professed his faith, rebuked Julian for his apostasy, and reminded him that he was the nephew of Constantine the Great. For this he was beheaded in 362, in extreme old age—by the traditional reckoning of his birth in 252, about 110 years old.

Eusignius is commemorated on 5 August, which in the Eastern Orthodox calendar is also the forefeast of the Transfiguration. He is one of the 140 Colonnade saints which adorn St. Peter's Square.
