= Michael Paknanas =

Saint Michail Baknanas
- Born: 1753; Athens, Ottoman Greece
- Died: July 4, 1771 (aged 17–18); Athens, Ottoman Greece
- Occupation: Gardener

Michael Baknanas, a.k.a. Michail Baknanas (Greek: Μιχαήλ Μπακνανάς; 1753 – July 9, 1771), was a Greek gardener and martyr. He was canonized as St Michael, the new martyr.

== Biography ==
He was born in Thission, Athens. Living during the Ottoman rule of Greece, Michael was approached by Muslim missionaries who attempted to convert him to Islam. He was tortured and eventually executed for his refusal to renounce Christianity.

== Legacy ==
A street (Baknana Street) and a nearby tram stop in Neos Kosmos in Athens were later named after him. His feast day is held on June 30.
