= Dabius =

Saint Dabius
- Born: Ireland
- Died: 5th century
- Feast: 22 July

Saint Dabius (or Davius, Bavins) was a 5th-century Irish missionary, possibly a disciple of Saint Patrick, who was active in Scotland, where several churches are named after him. His feast day is 22 July.

== Monks of Ramsgate ==
The monks of St Augustine's Abbey, Ramsgate, wrote in their Book of Saints (1921),

DABIUS (DAVIUS) (St.) (July 22) (Date uncertain.) Butler describes him as an Irish priest who worked in Scotland, where his name appears as title of churches. He may be identical with Saint Movean or Biteus, disciple of Saint Patrick. According to Smith and Wace, more to him than to Saint David of Wales are the Celtic dedications under that name to be assigned.

== Butler's account ==
The hagiographer Alban Butler wrote in his Lives of the Primitive Fathers, Martyrs, and Other Principal Saints (1799),

July XXII ...

St. Dabius, or Davius, C.

A zealous Irish priest who preached with wonderful fruit in his own country, and in Albany in Scotland : is titular saint of the parish of Domnach Cluanna in the county of Down, and Kippau in the Highlands, where a famous church is dedicated to God under his invocation by the name of Movean. See Colgan in MSS.

== Barrett's account ==
Michael Barrett wrote in his Calendar of Scottish Saints (1919),

St. Dabius or Bavins, Priest

Some historians have maintained that this saint was a native of Ireland; but the Scottish tradition affirms that he was born in Perthshire, and that he became a recluse in his native parish of Weem, where he built a small chapel.

The shelf of the great rock of Weem, upon which the chapel formerly stood, is still called "Chapel Rock." A holy well hard by is called after the saint.

This well was once much frequented by pilgrims. It was a common opinion that Saint Dabius would grant any wish made there if an offering were thrown into the water. When the well was cleaned out some years ago a large number of coins was discovered; these were evidently offerings of the kind. There was an ancient burial ground at Weems which bore the name of the saint, and on his feast-day a fair was held annually there.

The name Kildavie (Church of Davius) which is found in the parish of Kilblane, in Bute, and also in the parish of Kilninian, in Mull, testifies to ancient churches in honour of Saint Davius in those localities. The Church of Kippen, Stirlingshire, is also dedicated to this saint, under the designation of "Movean."

== Sources ==
- Barrett, Dom Michael (2020-07-18), A Calendar of Scottish Saints, BoD – Books on Demand, ISBN 978-3-7523-2290-3 This article incorporates text from this source, which is in the public domain.
- Butler, Alban (1799), The Lives of the Primitive Fathers, Martyrs, and Other Principal Saints... by the Rev. Alban Butler..., J. Moir This article incorporates text from this source, which is in the public domain.
- St. Augustine's Abbey, Ramsgate (1921), The Book of saints : a dictionary of servants of God canonized by the Catholic Church, London: A. & C. Black, ltd. This article incorporates text from this source, which is in the public domain.
