= April 3 (Eastern Orthodox liturgics) =

Day in the Eastern Orthodox liturgical calendar

Eastern Orthodox liturgical calendar
April 2	April 3	April 4
April 3 O.S. ≍ April 16 N.S. April 3 N.S ≍ March 21 O.S.

An Eastern Orthodox cross

April 3 in Eastern Orthodox liturgical calendars is a feast day and a day of commemoration of saints and martyrs. Although some Orthodox churches use the Revised Julian Calendar and others use the traditional Julian calendar, the fixed commemorations for their respective April 3 are broadly the same, no matter which calendar is used. (Note: Despite the dates being the same, the days to which they refer typically differ by 13 days. The notation Old Style or O.S. is sometimes used to indicate a date in the traditional Julian Calendar (the "Old Calendar"). The notation New Style or N.S. indicates a date in the Revised Julian calendar (the "New Calendar").)

== Saints ==
- Martyr Elpidephorus (3rd century)
- Martyrs Dius, Bithonius, and Galycus (3rd century)
- Martyrs Cassius, Philip, and Eutychius, of Thessaloniki (304)
- Virgin-martyrs Irene, Agapia and Chionia of Aquileia, in Thessaloniki (304) (see also: April 16)
- Martyr Ulphianus of Tyre (306)
- Virgin-martyr Theodosia of Tyre (308) (see also: April 2)
- Martyrs Evagrius, Benignus, Chrestus, Arestus, Kinnudius, Rufus, Patricius, and Zosima, at Tomis in Moesia (c. 310)
- Venerable Illyrius, monk of Mount Myrsinon in the Peloponnese.
- Venerable Nicetas of Medikion (Nicetas the Confessor), Abbot of Medikion (824) (Note: "In the monastery of Medicion, in the East, the abbot St. Nicetas, who suffered much for the worship of holy images, in the time of Leo the Armenian.") (Not to be confused with Nicetas the Confessor - May 28)
- Venerable Joseph the Hymnographer, of Sicily (883) (see also: April 4 - Russian)

== Pre-Schism Western saints ==
- Saint Pancras of Taormina (Pancratius), born in Antioch, consecrated by the Apostle Peter and sent to Taormina in Sicily where he was stoned to death (c. 40) (Note: "AT Taormina, in Sicily, the bishop St. Pancratius, who sealed, with a martyr's blood, the gospel of Christ which the apostle St. Peter had sent him thither to preach.")
- Saint Sixtus I (Xystus), Pope of Rome from 117 to c 125, sometimes referred to as a martyr (c. 125)
- Saint Fara (Burgundofara) of Eboriac, now Faremoutiers (657) (Note: Blessed by St Columbanus as a child, she became a nun despite her father's opposition, and so began the convent of Brige in France. This was later called Faremoutiers, i.e. Fara's Monastery, where she was abbess for thirty-seven years.)
- Saint Attala (Attalus), a monk and abbot of a monastery in Taormina in Sicily (ca. 800)

== Post-Schism Orthodox saints ==
- Saint Philip I, Metropolitan of Moscow (1473) (see also: April 5)
- Saint Nectarius, founder of Bezhetsk Monastery, Tver (1492)
- New Martyr Paul the Russian at Constantinople (1683) (see also: April 6)
- Venerable Amphilochios (Makris), Elder, of Patmos (1970) (Note: He was glorified by the Holy Synod of the Ecumenical Patriarchate of Constantinople on August 29, 2018: (in Greek) α) Εἰσηγήσει τῆς Κανονικῆς Ἐπιτροπῆς συμπεριελήφθη εἰς τό Ἁγιολόγιον τῆς Ὀρθοδόξου Ἐκκλησίας ὁ ἐν Πάτμῳ ἀσκήσας καί ἀναπτύξας μέγα πνευματικόν καί κοινωφελές ἔργον ἐν Δωδεκανήσῳ, Κρήτῃ καί ἀλλαχοῦ Ἀρχιμανδρίτης Ἀμφιλόχιος Μακρῆς, διατελέσας Ἡγούμενος τῆς ἱστορικῆς Ἱερᾶς Μονῆς Ἁγίου Ἰωάννου τοῦ Θεολόγου καί Πατριαρχικός Ἔξαρχος Πάτμου, ὅστις καί ἵδρυσε τήν ἐν τῇ Νήσῳ γυναικείαν Ἱεράν Μονήν Εὐαγγελισμοῦ Μητρός Ἠγαπημένου.) (see also: April 16 - ns)

== Other commemorations ==
- Synaxis of the Icon of the Most Holy Theotokos "The Unfading Rose" (Unfading Blossom, Flower of Incorruption).

== Icon gallery ==
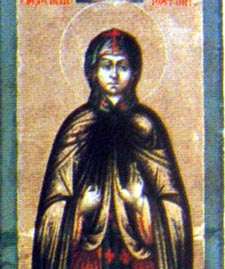
Virgin-martyr Theodosia of Tyre.

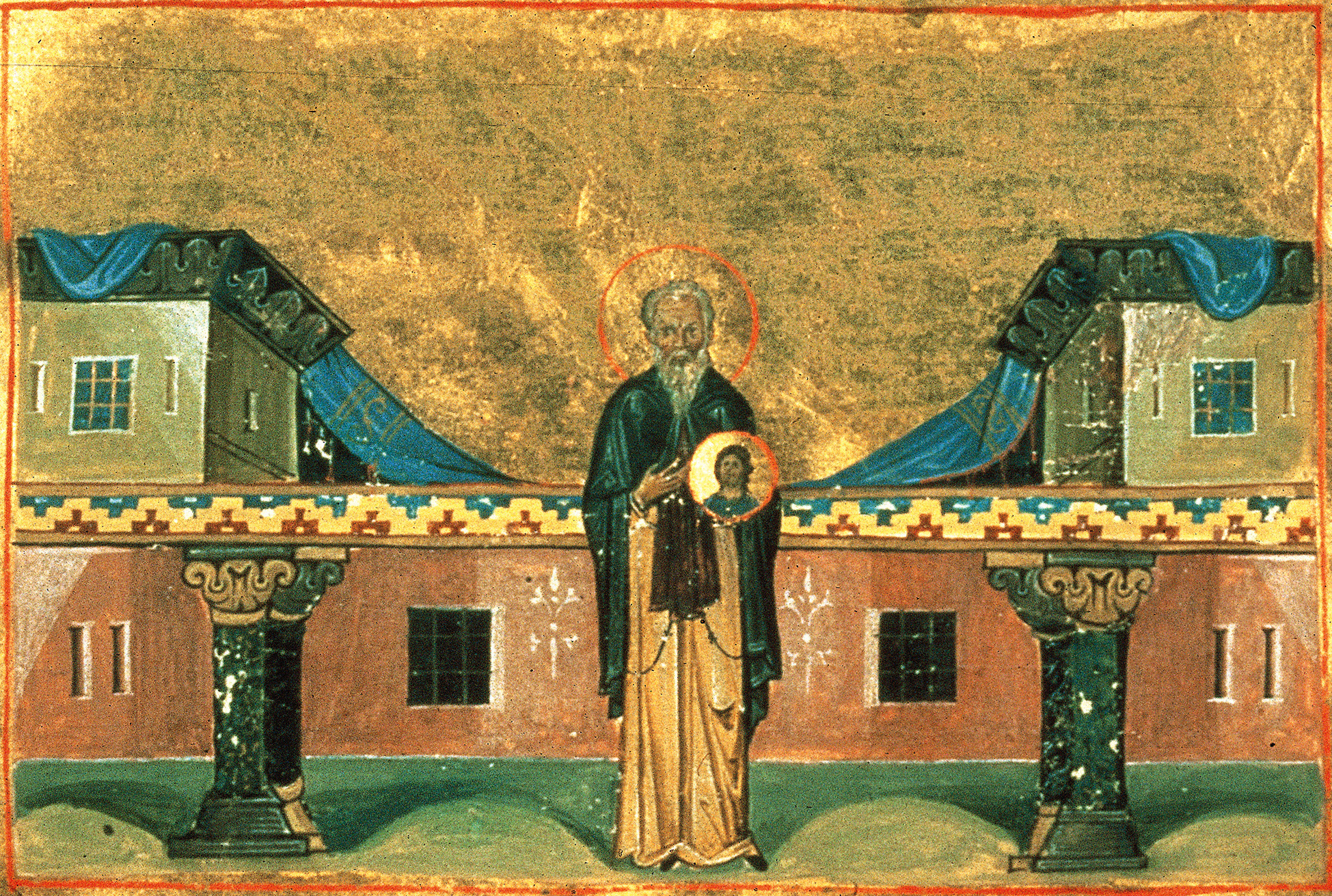
St. Nicetas of Medikion (Nicetas the Confessor), Abbot of Medikion.
(Menologion of Basil II, 10th century).

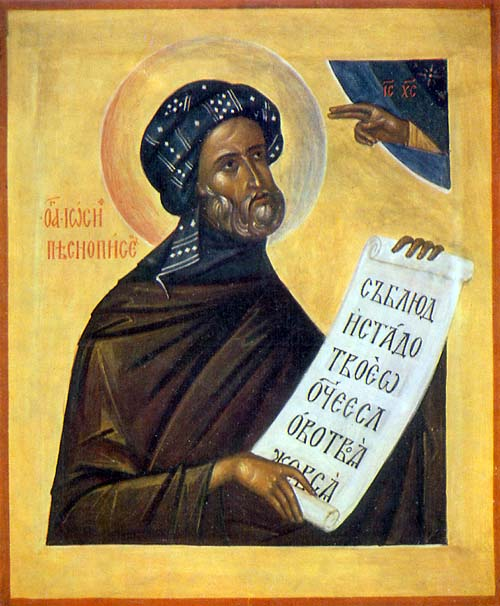
Venerable Joseph the Hymnographer, of Sicily.

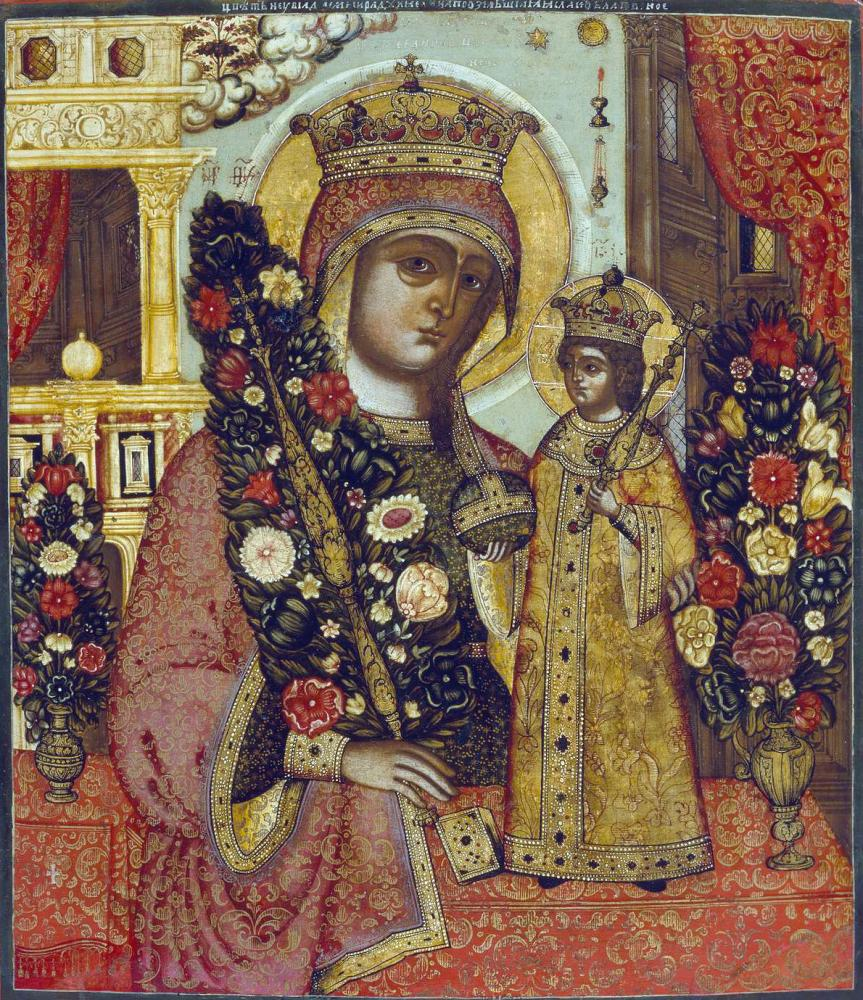
Theotokos "The Unfading Rose" (The Unfading Blossom, The Flower of Incorruption)

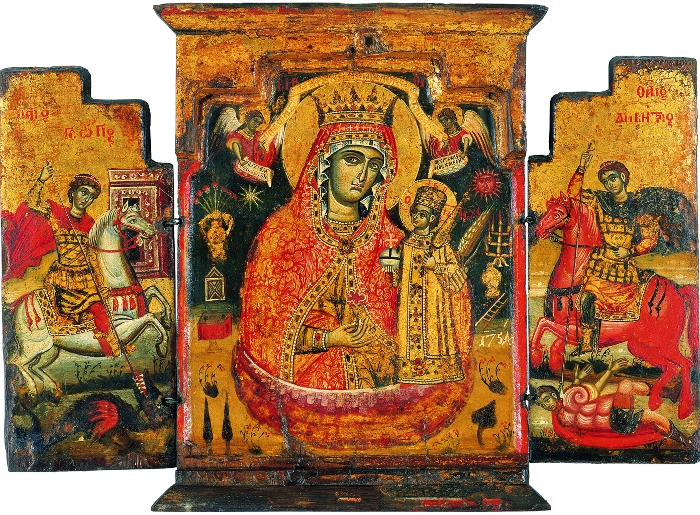
Theotokos "The Unfading Rose", with Sts. George and Demetrios.

== Sources ==
- April 3 / April 16. Orthodox Calendar (Pravoslavie.ru).
- April 16 / April 3. Holy Trinity Russian Orthodox Church (A parish of the Patriarchate of Moscow).
- April 3. OCA - The Lives of the Saints.
- The Autonomous Orthodox Metropolia of Western Europe and the Americas. St. Hilarion Calendar of Saints for the year of our Lord 2004. St. Hilarion Press (Austin, TX). p. 26.
- April 3. Latin Saints of the Orthodox Patriarchate of Rome.
- The Roman Martyrology. Transl. by the Archbishop of Baltimore. Last Edition, According to the Copy Printed at Rome in 1914. Revised Edition, with the Imprimatur of His Eminence Cardinal Gibbons. Baltimore: John Murphy Company, 1916. p. 95.
- Rev. Richard Stanton. A Menology of England and Wales, or, Brief Memorials of the Ancient British and English Saints Arranged According to the Calendar, Together with the Martyrs of the 16th and 17th Centuries. London: Burns & Oates, 1892. pp. 141–143.

Greek Sources

- Great Synaxaristes: (in Greek) 3 Απριλιου. Μεγασ Συναξαριστησ.
- (in Greek) Συναξαριστής. 3 Απριλίου. Ecclesia.gr. (H Εκκλησια Τησ ΕΛΛαδοσ).

Russian Sources

- (in Russian) 16 апреля (3 апреля). Православная Энциклопедия под редакцией Патриарха Московского и всея Руси Кирилла (электронная версия). (Orthodox Encyclopedia - Pravenc.ru).
- (in Russian) 3 апреля (ст.ст.) 16 апреля 2013 (нов. ст.). Русская Православная Церковь Отдел внешних церковных связей.
