= Nicetas the Confessor =

Nicetas the Confessor may refer to:

- Nicetas of Medikion (died 824), iconophile monk and abbot
- Saint Nicetas the Patrician (died 836), iconophile monk and abbot
