= April 1 (Eastern Orthodox liturgics) =

Day in the Eastern Orthodox liturgical calendar

Eastern Orthodox liturgical calendar
| March 31 | April 1 | April 2 |
April 1 O.S. ≍ April 14 N.S. April 1 N.S ≍ March 19 O.S.

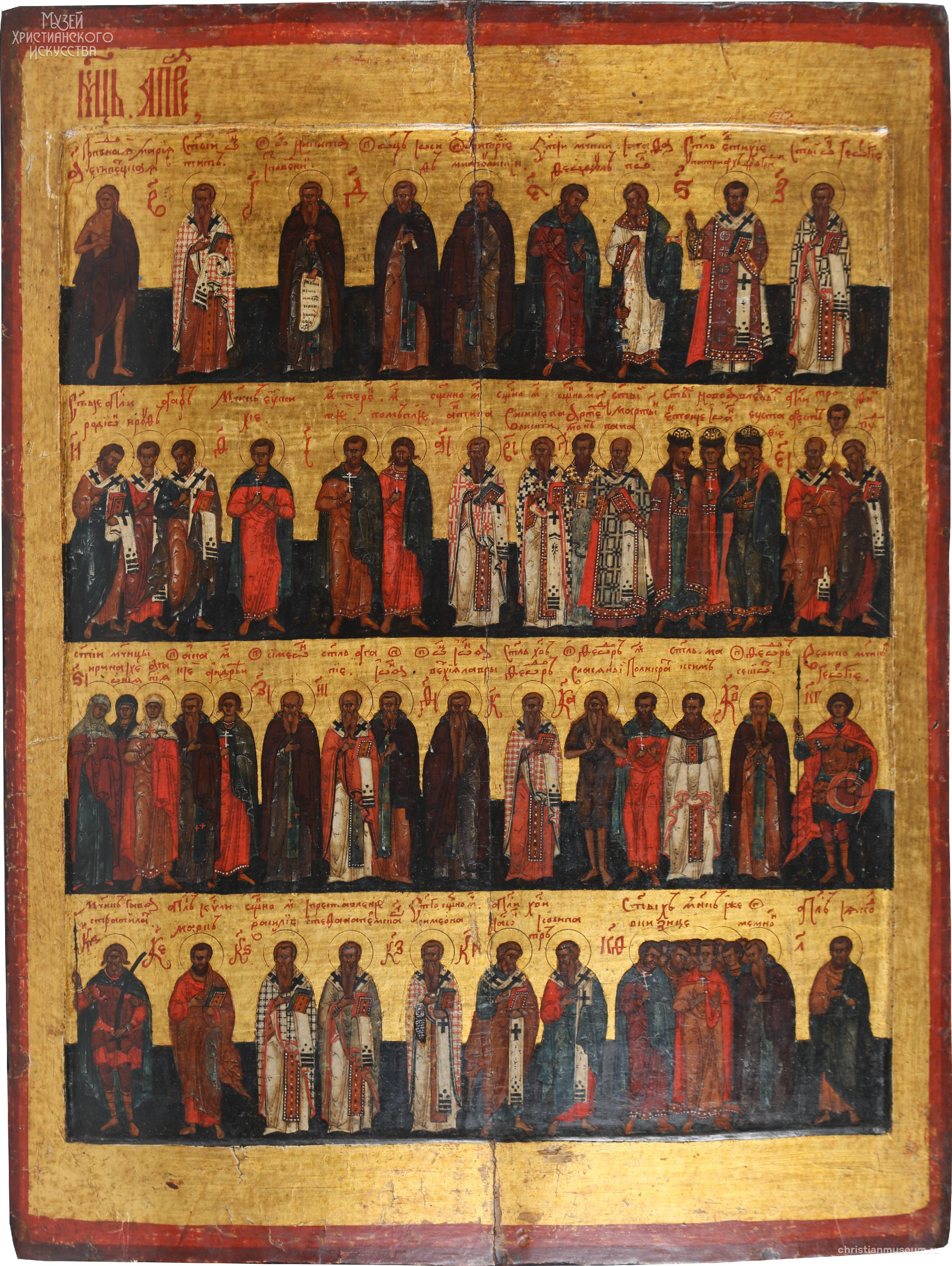
Menaion icon - April: One day = one saint

April 1 in Eastern Orthodox liturgical calendars is a feast day and a day of commemoration of saints and martyrs. Although some Orthodox churches use the Revised Julian Calendar and others use the traditional Julian calendar, the fixed commemorations for their respective April 1 are broadly the same, no matter which calendar is used. (Note: Despite the dates being the same, the days to which they refer typically differ by 13 days. The notation Old Style or O.S. is sometimes used to indicate a date in the traditional Julian Calendar (the "Old Calendar"). The notation New Style or N.S. indicates a date in the Revised Julian calendar (the "New Calendar").)

== Saints ==
- Saints Hermes and Theodora the martyrs (132) (Note: "AT Rome, the passion of St. Theodora, sister of the illustrious martyr Hermes, who underwent martyrdom in the time of the emperor Adrian, under the judge Aurelian, and was buried by the side of her brother, on the Salarian road, a short distance from the city.")
- Saint Melito of Sardis, Bishop of Sardis (177)
- Martyrs Gerontius and Basilides (3rd century) (Note: A church dedicated to Martyr Gerontius existed in Constantinople until the end of the 14th century.)
- Saints Alexander, Dionysius, Ingeniani, Panteros (or Pantainos), Parthenios and Saturninus the Martyrs. (Note: As indicated in the Martyrologium Hieronymianum.)
- Martyr Polynikos.
- Righteous Achaz (Ahaz) (Note: Holy Righteous Ahaz died in peace. It is not known where and when.)
- Saint Mary of Egypt (c. 421)
- Saint Makarios of Pelekete, Abbot of Pelekete Monastery (820) (Note: "At Constantinople, under the emperor Leo, St. Macarius, confessor, who ended his life in exile for the defence of the honor paid to sacred images.")
- Saint Procopius of Sázava, Abbot of Sázava in Bohemia (1053) (see also: July 4 - West)

== Pre-Schism Western saints ==
- Venantius, a Dalmatian bishop whose relics were brought from Spalato to Rome in 641 (c. 255)
- Saint Walric (Walericus, Valéry), Abbot of Leuconay (Saint-Valery-sur-Somme) (622) (Note: "At Amiens, the abbot St. Valery, whose tomb is made illustrious by frequent miracles.")
- Saints Caidoc and Fricor (Adrian), Welsh missionaries (7th century) (Note: The Irishmen Caidoc and Fricor evangelized the country of the Morini in Picardy, northern France, beginning about 622. Among the souls they won for Christ was the nobleman Riquier (Saint Ricarius), who intervened when some locals to offense to their preaching and took them into his home. Riquier became a fervent Christian, who engaged in penitential austerities and eventually was ordained. In 625, Riquier founded Centula based on the Rule of Columbanus, another Irishman. Their relics are still venerated at the parish church of Saint-Riquier in the diocese of Amiens, although they rested in Centula until the 17th century. Saints Caidoc and Fricor joined Riquier's community and remained there until they were buried in Saint Riquier's church.)
- Saint Dodolinus of Vienne, Bishop of Vienne in the Dauphiné in France (7th century)
- Saint Cellach (Cellach mac Congaile), Archbishop of Armagh in Ireland, previously the Abbot of Iona in Scotland and founder of the Monastery of Kells (815)

== Post-Schism Orthodox saints ==
- Saint John Shavteli of Salosi (John of Black Mountain), Georgia (12th-13th century)
- Saint Eulogius of Salosi, Georgia, (Eulogius the Prophet), Fool-for-Christ (12th-13th century)
- Martyr Abraham of Bulgaria, on the Volga, Wonderworker of Vladimir (1229)
- Saint Gerontius of the Kiev Caves, Canonarch of the Kiev Caves (14th century)
- Saint Euthymius the Wonderworker, Archimandrite of Suzdal (1404)
- Saint Pachomius (Romansky), Archbishop of Roman and Galați, Moldavia, and monk of the Kiev Caves (1724) (Note: St. Pachomius was a Romanian bishop who was very devoted to the spirituality of St Paisius Velichkovsky and to the Saints of the Kiev Caves Lavra where he asked to spend his final days and as entombed at the Holy Dormition Lavra. He was glorified by the Romanian Orthodox Church in 2006 and his name was then added to the Ukrainian Orthodox Calendar.) (see also: April 14 - Romanian)
- Saint Barsanuphius of Optina, Elder (1913)

=== New martyrs and confessors ===
- New martyr Michael (Misha), Fool-for-Christ (1931)
- New Hieromartyr Sergius (Zavarin), Archpriest, of Yaroslavl (1938) (Note: See: (in Russian) Заварин, Сергей Константинович. Википедии. (Russian Wikipedia).)
- New Hiero-confessor Schema-bishop Macarius (Vasiliev), at the Pskov Caves Monastery (1944) (Note: See: (in Russian) Макарий (Васильев). Википедии. (Russian Wikipedia).)

== Icon gallery ==
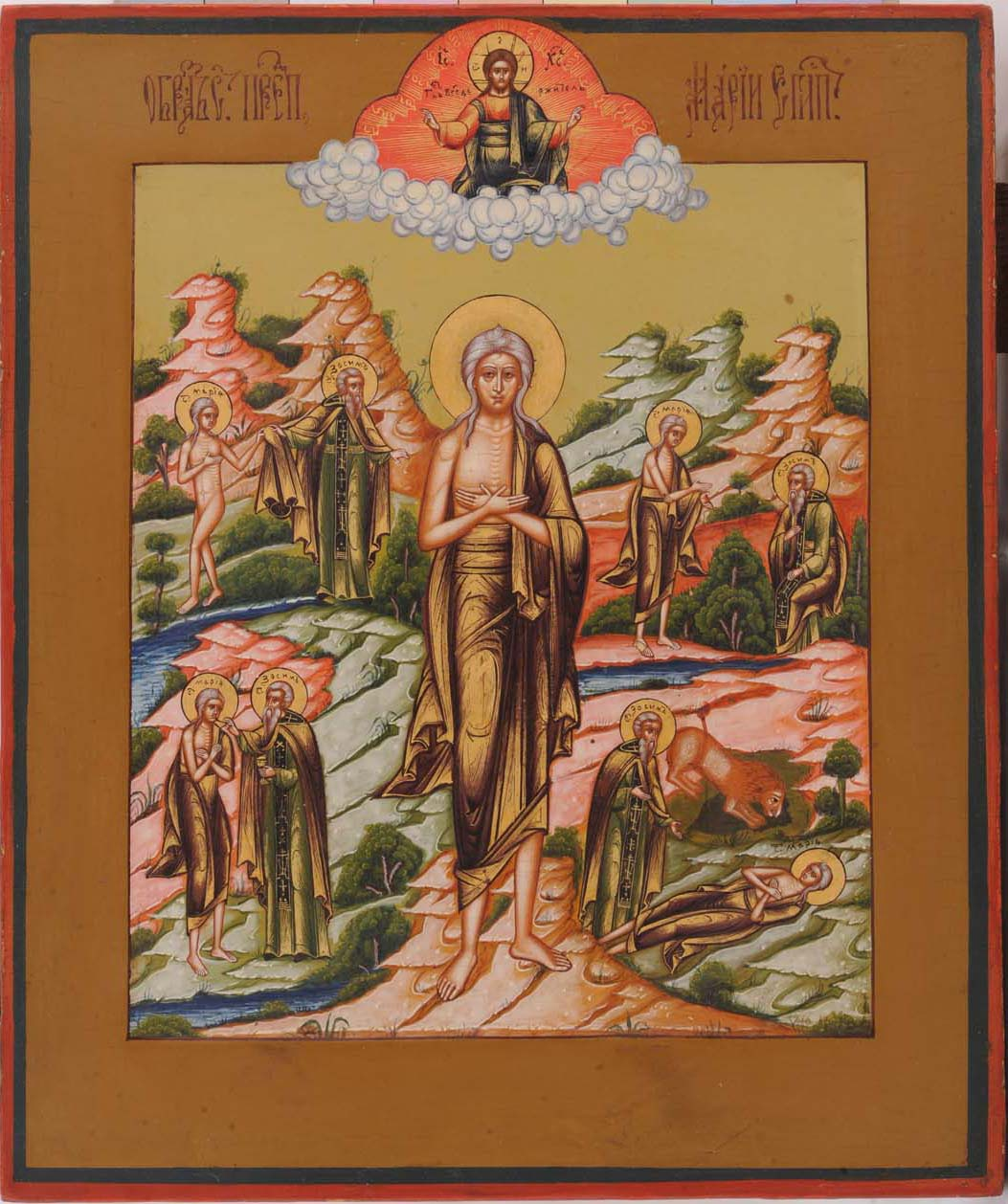
St. Mary of Egypt. Russian icon, 19th century

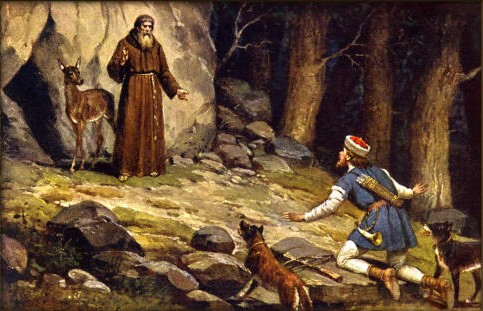
St. Procopius of Sázava.

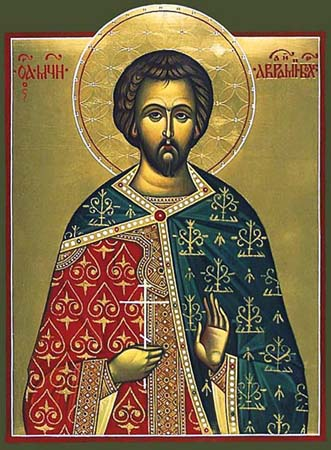
St. Abraham of Bulgaria.

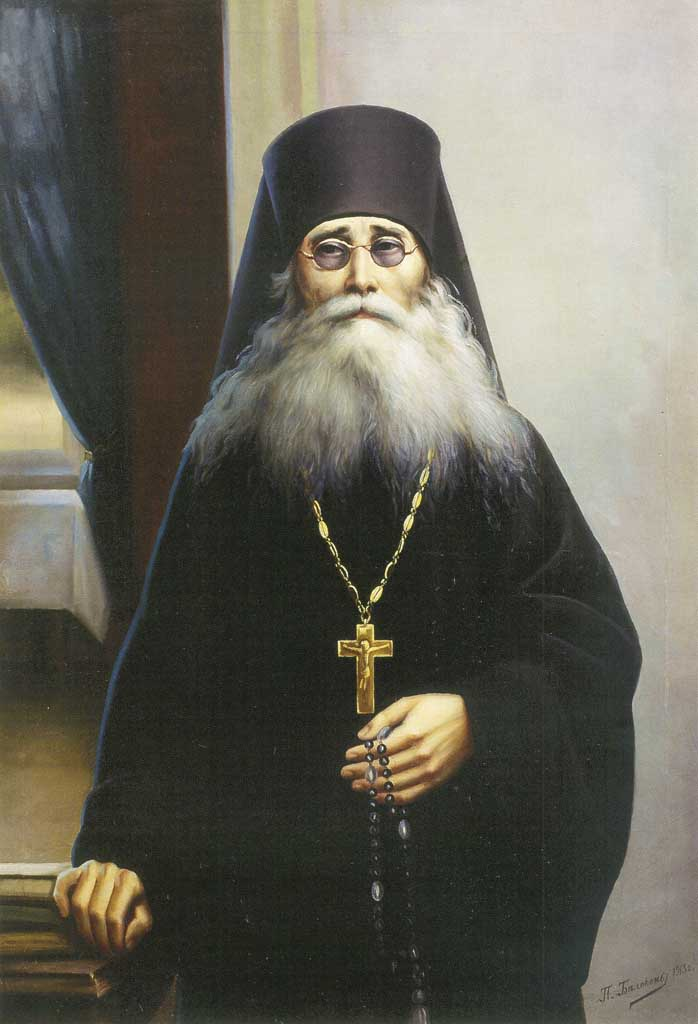
St. Barsanuphius of Optina.

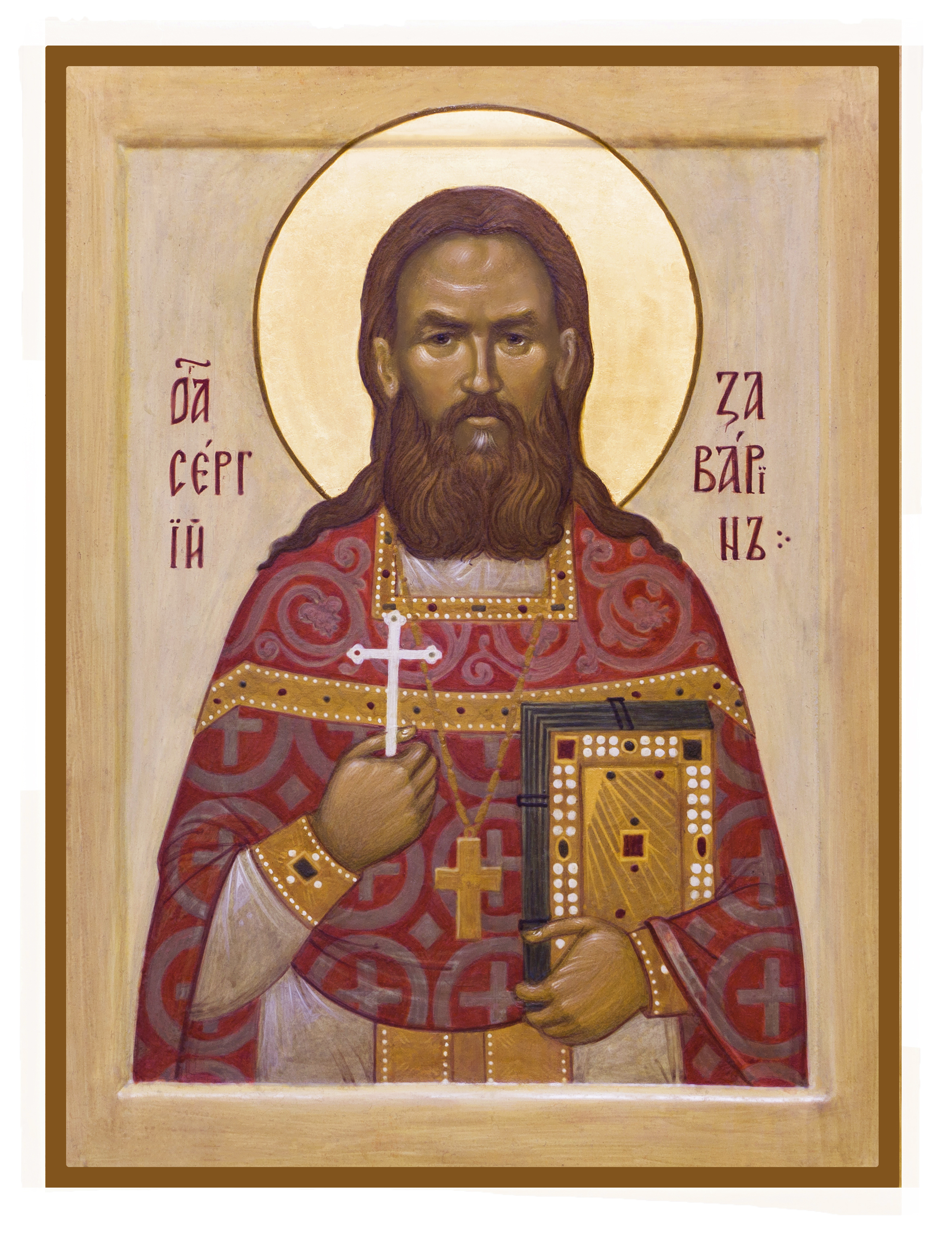
New Hieromartyr Sergius (Zavarin), Archpriest, of Yaroslavl.

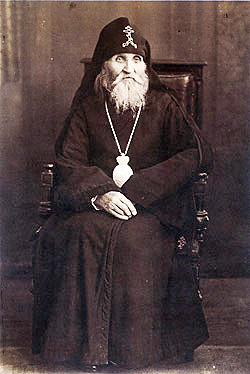
New Hiero-confessor Schema-bishop Macarius (Vasiliev).

== Sources ==
- April 1/14. Orthodox Calendar Pravoslavie.ru).
- April 14 / April 1. Holy Trinity Russian Orthodox Church (A parish of the Patriarchate of Moscow).
- April 1. OCA - The Lives of the Saints.
- April 1. Latin Saints of the Orthodox Patriarchate of Rome.
- The Roman Martyrology. Transl. by the Archbishop of Baltimore. Last Edition, According to the Copy Printed at Rome in 1914. Revised Edition, with the Imprimatur of His Eminence Cardinal Gibbons. Baltimore: John Murphy Company, 1916. p. 93.
- Rev. Richard Stanton. A Menology of England and Wales, or, Brief Memorials of the Ancient British and English Saints Arranged According to the Calendar, Together with the Martyrs of the 16th and 17th Centuries. London: Burns & Oates, 1892. p. 140.

Greek Sources

- Great Synaxaristes: (in Greek) 1 Απριλιου. Μεγασ Συναξαριστησ.
- (in Greek) Συναξαριστής. 1 Απριλίου. Ecclesia. (H Εκκλησια Τηε Ελλαδοσ).

Russian Sources

- (in Russian) 14 апреля (1 апреля). Православная Энциклопедия под редакцией Патриарха Московского и всея Руси Кирилла (электронная версия). (Orthodox Encyclopedia - Pravenc.ru).
- (in Russian) 1 апреля (ст.ст.) 14 апреля 2013 (нов. ст.). Русская Православная Церковь Отдел внешних церковных связей. (DECR).
