= April 15 (Eastern Orthodox liturgics) =

Day in the Eastern Orthodox liturgical calendar

Eastern Orthodox liturgical calendar
| April 14 | April 15 | April 16 |
April 15 O.S. ≍ April 28 N.S. April 15 N.S ≍ April 2 O.S.

An Eastern Orthodox cross

April 15 in Eastern Orthodox liturgical calendars is a feast day and a day of commemoration of saints and martyrs. Although some Orthodox churches use the Revised Julian Calendar and others use the traditional Julian calendar, the fixed commemorations for their respective April 15 are broadly the same, no matter which calendar is used. (Note: Despite the dates being the same, the days to which they refer typically differ by 13 days. The notation Old Style or O.S. is sometimes used to indicate a date in the traditional Julian Calendar (the "Old Calendar"). The notation New Style or N.S. indicates a date in the Revised Julian calendar (the "New Calendar").)

== Saints ==
- Apostles Aristarchus of Apamea, Pudens, and Trophimus of the Seventy Apostles (c. 67) (see also: April 14 - Greek)
- Martyrs Basilissa and Anastasia of Rome, disciples of Apostles Peter and Paul (c. 68) (Note: "AT Rome, the Saints Basilissa and Anastasia. Of noble family, they were disciples of the Apostles, and as they persevered courageously in the profession of their faith in the time of the emperor Nero, they had their tongues and feet cut off, were put to the sword, and thus obtained the crown of martyrdom.")
- Martyr Sukia (Suchias) and nineteen companions with him, including (c. 100-130):

- Andrew, Anastasius, Thalaleus, Theodoretus, Ivchirion, Jordan, Quadratus, Lucian, Mimnenus, Nerangius, Polyeuctus, Jacob, Phocas, Domentianus, Victor, and Zosima (Chorimos), of Georgia, in Armenia.

- Hieromartyr Theodore and martyr Pausilippus of Thrace, by the sword (c. 117-138)
- Martyrs Maximus and Olympiada, in Persia (c. 249-251) (Note: "In Persia, in the reign of the emperor Decius, the holy martyrs Maxinius and OJympiades, who were beaten with rods and whips, and struck on their heads with clubs until they breathed their last.")
- Saint Leonidas, Bishop of Athens (250) (Note: Name days celebrated today include: Leonidas (Λεωνίδας).; See: (in Greek) Άγιος Λεωνίδας Επίσκοπος Αθηνών. Βικιπαίδεια. (Greek Wikipedia).)
- Martyr Crescens of Myra in Lycia, by fire (3rd century) (see also: April 13 - Slavic)
- Martyr Sabbas the Goth, at Buzău in Wallachia (372) (Note: St Sava the Goth in Bessarabia (372). Sava was martyred by pagan Goths. St Basil the Great asked for his relics, which he received, and wrote a panegyric in St Sava’s honour. He is especially venerated throughout Bessarabia, Moldavia, Wallachia and Romania.) (see also: April 12 - Greek and Romanian)
- Saint Ephraim the Great of Atsquri (9th century) (see also: April 17)

== Pre-Schism Western saints ==
- Martyrs Maro, Eutyches and Victorinus, at Rome, under Trajan (c. 99) (Note: "The same day, the holy martyrs Maro, Eutyches, and Victorinus, who, with blessed Flavia Domitilla, were banished to the island of Pontia (Ponza) for the confession of Christ. Being recalled in the reign of Nerva, and having converted many to the faith, they were put to death in different manners by the judge Valerian during the persecution of Trajan.")
- Martyr Eutychius, in Ferentino in Italy.
- Child-martyr Laurentinus Sossius, a boy aged five, martyred on Good Friday in Valrovina near Vicenza in Italy (485)
- Saint Paternus (Paternus of Vannes, Padarn), Bishop and founder of the monastery of Llanbadarn Fawr (the great monastery of Padarn) near Aberystwyth in Wales (565) (Note: "Several Saints bear the name of Paternus. The one commemorated to-day was intimately connected with Great Britain, though a native of Brittany, and the son of a holy man called Petran, who had quitted his family and his country to embrace the religious state in Ireland. St. Padarn also forsook his home with the intention of joining his father; but, by the order of Providence, he landed in Wales, and there found an ample field for the exercise of his zeal in God's service. He established the great Abbey of Llanbadarn Vaur, which is said to have been the seat of his bishopric, and, according to the tradition, built other monasteries and churches. He was indefatigable in preaching the Faith, consoling the sick and afflicted, and ministering to the poor, while he was incessantly devoted to prayer and holy austerity of life. By such virtues he earned the title of one of the Blessed Visitors of Britain. According to the account received in Brittany, St. Padarn, after completing his work in Wales, returned to his native country, and there reposed in the Lord.") (see also: April 16)
- Saint Ruadhan (Ruadan, Rodan), one of the leading disciples of St Finian of Clonard, founder and abbot of Lothra, Ireland (c. 584)
- Saint Silvester, second Abbot of Moutier-Saint-Jean (Réome) near Dijon in France (c. 625)
- Saint Hunna, the self-sacrificing wife of a nobleman in Alsace, now in France (679)
- Saint Nidger (Nidgar, Nitgar, Neodegar), Abbot of Ottobeuren Abbey in Bavaria, became Bishop of Augsburg in Germany (c. 829)
- Saint Mundus (Munde, Mund, Mond), an abbot who founded several monasteries in Argyll in Scotland (c. 962)

== Post-Schism Orthodox saints ==
- Saint Mstislav-Theodore, Prince of Kiev (1132) (Note: St Mstislav, Sovereign of Kyiv (1132). A son of St Volodymyr Monomach and his English wife, Gytha (daughter of King Harold of England), Mstislav received a second name in Baptism, that of his royal English grandfather, "Harold". In fact, the Norse sagas mention him only as "Harald".)
- Venerable Basil of Moldovita, Igumen of Moldovița Monastery and Wonderworker (ca. 1455) (Note: "Miracle worker, born Bucovina, 1370-75, died Moldovita, c. 1455. Romanian Church. He was hegumenos of the monastery of Moldovita between 1445 and 1455, and organized the monks into three groups who took it in turns to pray, work and celebrate the liturgy. He had the gift of healing.")
- Venerable Dionysius of Pereyaslavl-Zalessky, monk of the Nikitsky Monastery (1645)
- Hieromartyr Ananias (Lambardis) of Lacedaemonia, Metropolitan Bishop of Lacedaemonia (1764)
- Basil of Poiana Mărului (1767)
- Righteous Daniel of Achinsk, Siberia (1843)

=== New martyrs and confessors ===
- New Hieromartyr Alexander Gnevushev, Priest (1930)

== Other commemorations ==
- Repose of Hieroschemamonk Michael (Pitkevich) of Valaam and Pskov Caves, the last Elder of Valaam (1962)
- Repose of Bishop Stephen (Nikitin) of Kaluga (1963)

== Icon gallery ==
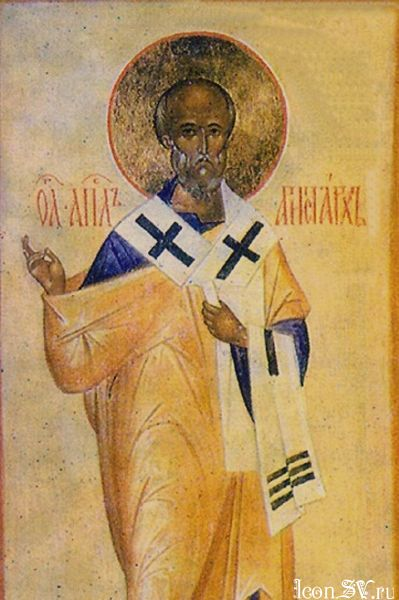
St. Aristarchus of Thessalonica (Aristarchus of Apamea).

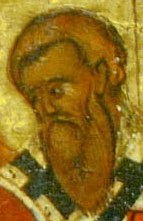
St. Pudens.

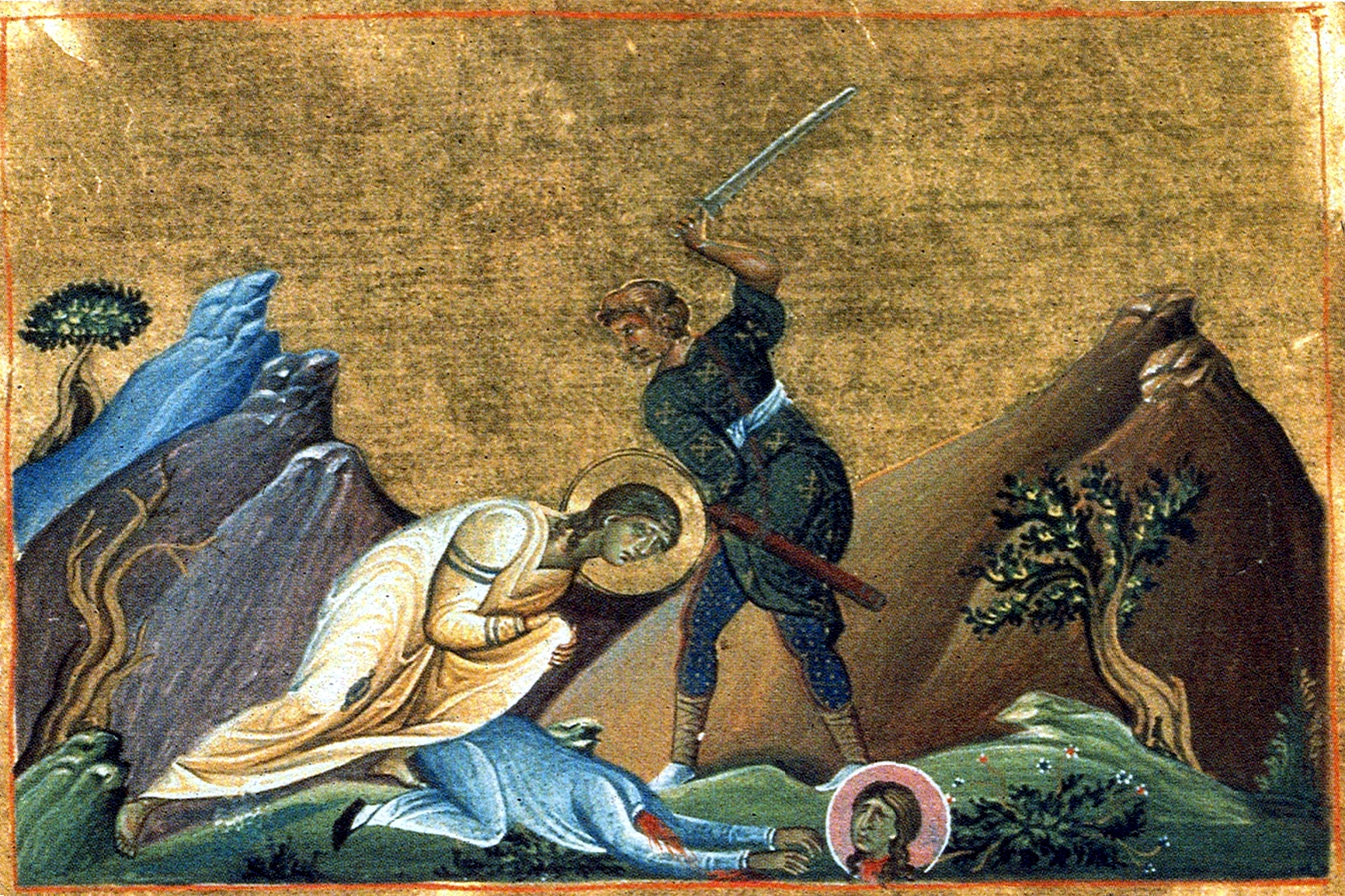
Martyrs Basilissa and Anastasia of Rome (Menologion of Basil II).

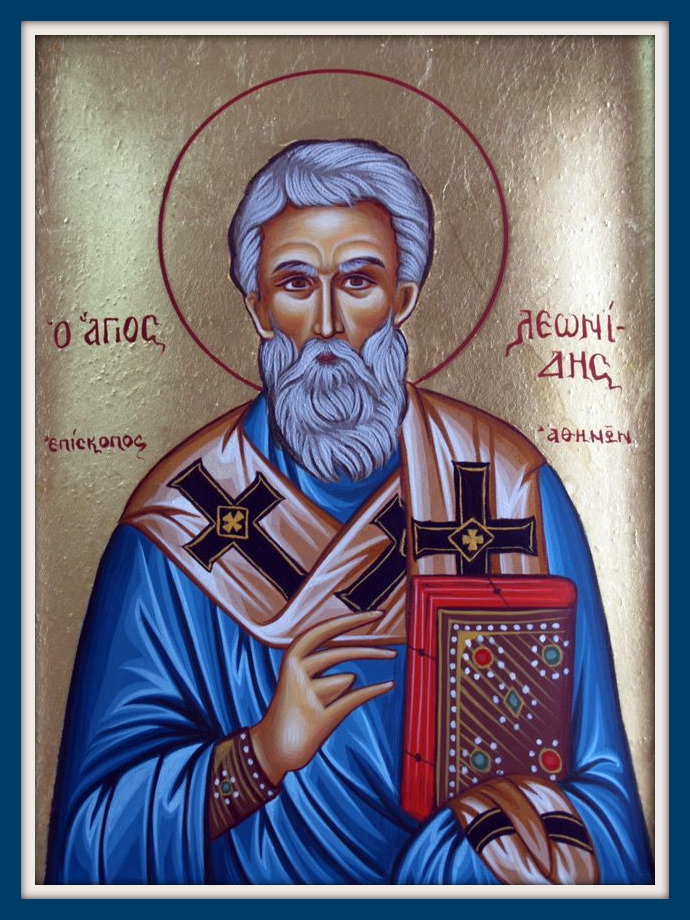
St. Leonidas, Bishop of Athens.

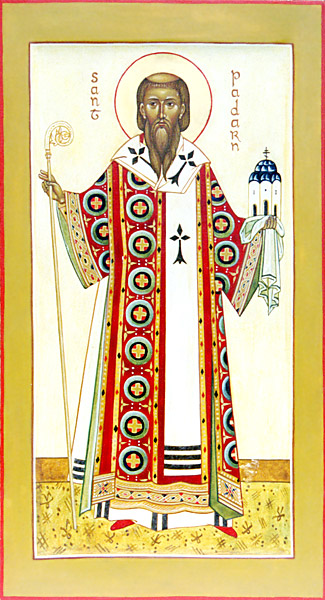
St. Paternus.

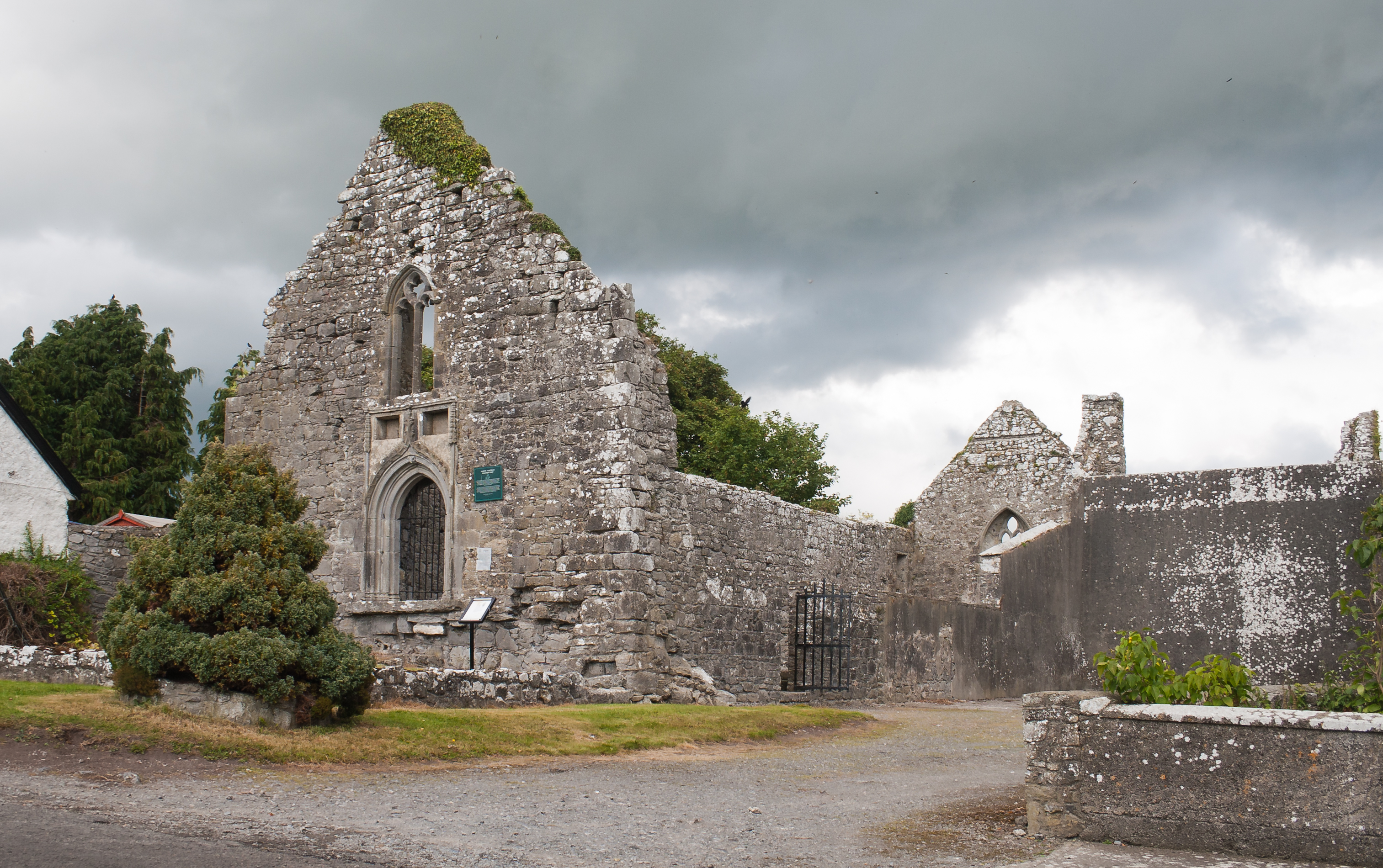
Lorrha Priory of St. Ruadhan.

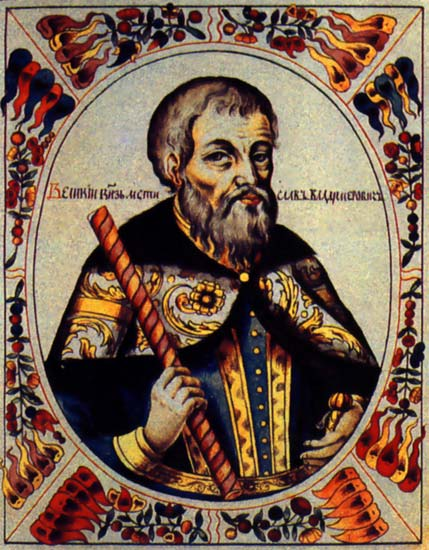
Saint Mstislav-Theodore, Prince of Kiev.

Righteous Daniel of Achinsk.

== Sources ==
- April 15 / April 28. Orthodox Calendar (pravoslavie.ru).
- April 28 / April 15. Holy Trinity Russian Orthodox Church (A parish of the Patriarchate of Moscow).
- April 15. OCA - The Lives of the Saints.
- The Autonomous Orthodox Metropolia of Western Europe and the Americas. St. Hilarion Calendar of Saints for the year of our Lord 2004. St. Hilarion Press (Austin, TX). p. 29.
- April 15. Latin Saints of the Orthodox Patriarchate of Rome.
- The Roman Martyrology. Transl. by the Archbishop of Baltimore. Last Edition, According to the Copy Printed at Rome in 1914. Revised Edition, with the Imprimatur of His Eminence Cardinal Gibbons. Baltimore: John Murphy Company, 1916. p. 106.
- Rev. Richard Stanton. A Menology of England and Wales, or, Brief Memorials of the Ancient British and English Saints Arranged According to the Calendar, Together with the Martyrs of the 16th and 17th Centuries. London: Burns & Oates, 1892. p. 159.

Greek Sources

- Great Synaxaristes: (in Greek) 15 Απριλίου. Μεγασ Συναξαριστησ.
- (in Greek) Συναξαριστής. 15 Απριλίου. ecclesia.gr. (H Εκκλησια Τησ Ελλαδοσ).

Russian Sources

- (in Russian) 28 апреля (15 апреля). Православная Энциклопедия под редакцией Патриарха Московского и всея Руси Кирилла (электронная версия). (Orthodox Encyclopedia - Pravenc.ru).
- (in Russian) 15 апреля (ст.ст.) 28 апреля 2013 (нов. ст.). Русская Православная Церковь Отдел внешних церковных связей.
