= Saint Theodosia =

Saint Theodosia may refer to:

- Theodosia of Tyre, martyred in 307 AD in Caesarea
- Theodosia of Constantinople, martyred in 729 in Constantinople
