= April 2 (Eastern Orthodox liturgics) =

Day in the Eastern Orthodox liturgical calendar

Eastern Orthodox liturgical calendar
April 1	April 2	April 3
April 2 O.S. ≍ April 15 N.S. April 2 N.S ≍ March 20 O.S.

An Eastern Orthodox cross

April 2 in Eastern Orthodox liturgical calendars is a feast day and a day of commemoration of saints and martyrs. Although some Orthodox churches use the Revised Julian Calendar and others use the traditional Julian calendar, the fixed commemorations for their respective April 2 are broadly the same, no matter which calendar is used. (Note: Despite the dates being the same, the days to which they refer typically differ by 13 days. The notation Old Style or O.S. is sometimes used to indicate a date in the traditional Julian Calendar (the "Old Calendar"). The notation New Style or N.S. indicates a date in the Revised Julian calendar (the "New Calendar").)

== Saints ==
- Martyrs Amphianus (Apphianus) and his brother Aedesius, of Patara, Lycia (306) (Note: "At Caesarea, in Palestine, during the persecution of Galerius Maximian, the birthday of the martyr St. Amphian, who, because he reproved the governor Urban for sacrificing to idols, was cruelly lacerated and, with his feet wrapped in a cloth saturated with oil, was set on fire. After these painful tortures, he was plunged into the sea. Thus through fire and water, he reached everlasting repose.")
- Virgin-martyr Theodora of Palestine (Theodosia of Tyre) (308) (Note: "In the same city, the passion of St. Theodosia, a virgin of Tyre, who, in the same persecution, for having publicly saluted the holy confessors as they stood before the tribunal, and begged of them to remember her when they should be with God, was arrested and led to the governor Urban. By his order, her sides and breasts were lacerated to the very vitals, and she was thrown into the sea.") (see also: April 3)
- Martyr Polycarp of Alexandria (4th century)
- Venerable Stephen the Wonderworker, in Ascalon, Palestine (778)
- Venerable Titus the Wonderworker (9th century)
- Saint George of Atsquri, Georgia (9th-10th centuries)

== Pre-Schism Western saints ==
- Saint Urban of Langres, sixth Bishop of Langres in France, patron-saint of vine dressers (ca. 390)
- Saint Abundius, of Greek origin, he became Bishop of Como in the north of Italy (469) (Note: A theologian, he was sent to the Emperor Theodosius the Younger and encouraged the calling of the Council of Chalcedon in 451.)
- Saint Victor of Capua, Bishop of Capua in the south of Italy and a Church writer (554)
- Saint Nicetius of Lyon (Nizier), in Gaul (573)
- Saint Brónach (Bromana), called the Virgin of Glen-Seichis, now Kilbronach in Ireland.
- Saint Musa, a child in Rome who was granted visions, mentioned by her contemporary by St Gregory the Great (6th century)
- Saints Lonochilus (Longis, Lenogisil), priest who founded a monastery in Maine in France (653), and Agnofleda, a holy virgin (638)
- Venerable Virgin-martyr Æbbe the Younger of Coldingham, Abbess of Coldingham Priory in south-east Scotland (870) (see also: June 22)
- Saint Constantín mac Cináeda (Constantine I), King of Scotland, slain in a battle against heathen invaders of his country and honoured as a martyr, buried at Iona (877)
- Saint Rufus, a hermit at Glendalough in Ireland.
- Saint Drogo, a monk at Fleury-sur-Loire in France and afterwards at Baume-les-Messieurs (10th century)

== Post-Schism Orthodox saints ==
- Saint Sabbas, Archbishop of Sourozh, Crimea (11th century) (Note: Byzantine metropolis of Sougdaia.)
- Venerable Gregory, ascetic of Nicomedia (1240)

== Icon gallery ==
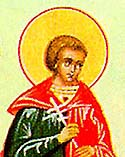
Martyr Amphianus (Apphianus).

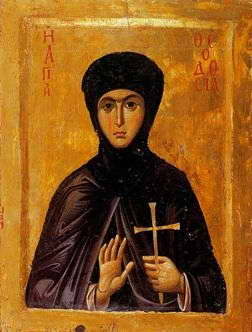
'Virgin-martyr Theodora of Palestine (Theodosia of Tyre)

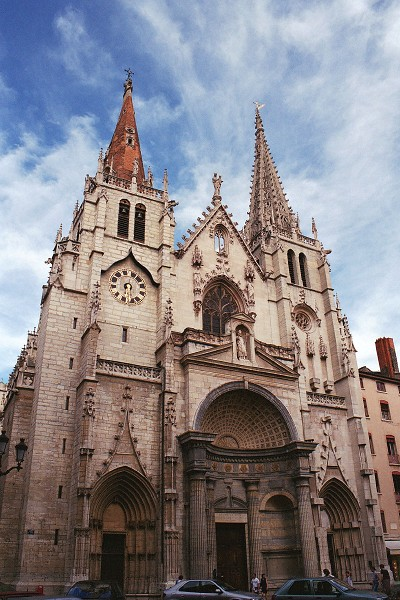
Facade of the Church of St Nicetius of Lyon, Lyon, France.

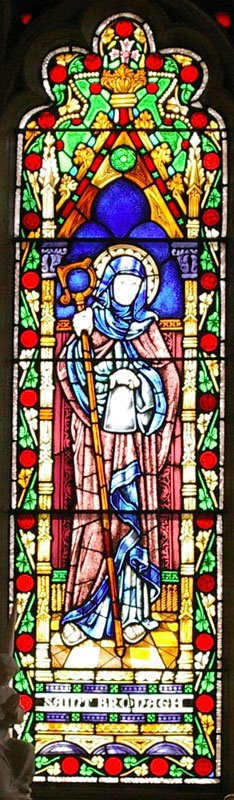
Stained glass of St. Brónach, Rostrevor Chapel.

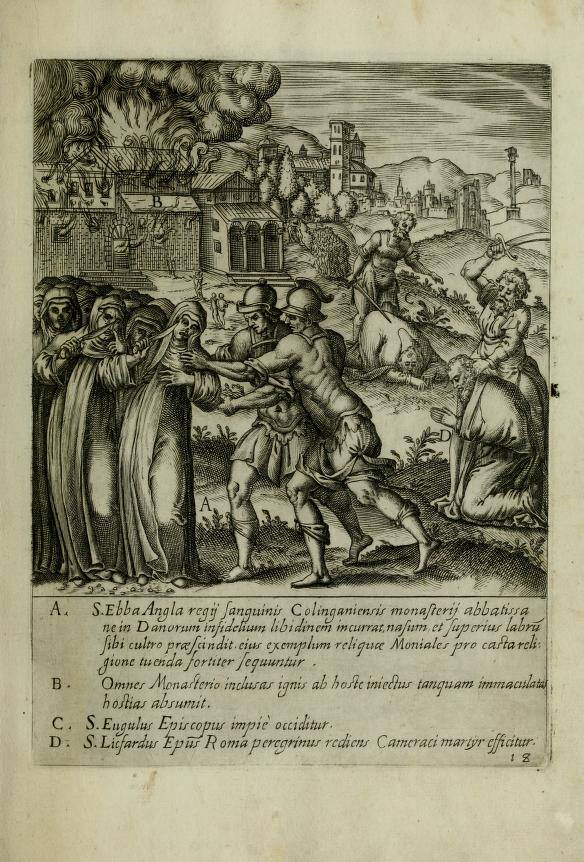
The self-mutilation of Saint Æbbe the Younger and her community.

== Sources ==
- April 2 / April 15. Orthodox Calendar (PRAVOSLAVIE.RU).
- April 15 / April 2. Holy Trinity Russian Orthodox Church (A parish of the Patriarchate of Moscow).
- April 2. OCA - The Lives of the Saints.
- The Autonomous Orthodox Metropolia of Western Europe and the Americas (ROCOR). St. Hilarion Calendar of Saints for the year of our Lord 2004. St. Hilarion Press (Austin, TX). p. 26.
- April 2. Latin Saints of the Orthodox Patriarchate of Rome.
- The Roman Martyrology. Transl. by the Archbishop of Baltimore. Last Edition, According to the Copy Printed at Rome in 1914. Revised Edition, with the Imprimatur of His Eminence Cardinal Gibbons. Baltimore: John Murphy Company, 1916. p. 94.
- Rev. Richard Stanton. A Menology of England and Wales, or, Brief Memorials of the Ancient British and English Saints Arranged According to the Calendar, Together with the Martyrs of the 16th and 17th Centuries. London: Burns & Oates, 1892. pp. 140–141.

Greek Sources

- Great Synaxaristes: (in Greek) 2 Απριλιου. Μεγασ ΣυναΞαριστησ.
- (in Greek) Συναξαριστής. 2 Απριλίου. Ecclesia.gr. (H Εκκλησια Τησ Ελλαδοσ).

Russian Sources

- (in Russian) 15 апреля (2 апреля). Православная Энциклопедия под редакцией Патриарха Московского и всея Руси Кирилла (электронная версия). (Orthodox Encyclopedia - Pravenc.ru).
- (in Russian) 2 апреля (ст.ст.) 15 апреля 2013 (нов. ст.). Русская Православная Церковь Отдел внешних церковных связей. (DECR).
