= March 20 (Eastern Orthodox liturgics) =

Day in the Eastern Orthodox liturgical calendar

Eastern Orthodox liturgical calendar
March 19	March 20	March 21
March 20 O.S. ≍ April 2 N.S. March 20 N.S ≍ March 7 O.S.

An Eastern Orthodox cross

March 20 in Eastern Orthodox liturgical calendars is a feast day and a day of commemoration of saints and martyrs. Although some Orthodox churches use the Revised Julian Calendar and others use the traditional Julian calendar, the fixed commemorations for their respective March 20 are broadly the same, no matter which calendar is used. (Note: Despite the dates being the same, the days to which they refer typically differ by 13 days. The notation Old Style or O.S. is sometimes used to indicate a date in the traditional Julian Calendar (the "Old Calendar"). The notation New Style or N.S. indicates a date in the Revised Julian calendar (the "New Calendar").)

== Saints ==
- Righteous Abel, first martyr in the history of mankind.
- Martyrs Photina (Fatima, Svetlana), the Samaritan woman, martyred under Nero (c. 66), together with: (see also: February 26 - Greek)

- her sisters Phota, Photis, Parasceva, and Cyriaca (Kyriake);
- her sons Victor (or Photinus) and Joses (Joseph);
- Sebastian the Duke;
- the officer Anatolius; and
- Theoclitus, the former sorcerer.

- Seven Virgin-martyrs of Amisus (Samsun) (c. 303-305): (Note: The Holy Virgin Martyrs Alexandra, Claudia, Euphrasia, Matrona, Juliania, Euphemia and Theodosia were arrested in the city of Amisa (on the coastal region of the Black Sea) during the persecution against Christians under the emperor Maximian Galerius (305-311). Under interrogation they confessed their faith and were subjected to cruel tortures for this. The malefactors scourged and beat them with rods, and cut off their breasts. After this, they were suspended and torn with sharp hooks. Finally, the holy virgins were burned alive in a red-hot oven (+ 310).)

- Alexandra, Claudia, Euphrasia, Matrona, Juliana, Euphemia, and Theodosia.

- Martyr Akyla the Eparch, by the sword.
- Martyr Emmanuel, by the sword.
- Martyr Rodian, by the sword.
- Martyr Lollian the Elder.
- Hieromartyr Tadros, Bishop of Edessa, at Jerusalem (691)
- Martyr Michael the Sabbaite, at Jerusalem (691)
- Martyr Archil II (Archilios II), king of Georgia (744) (see also: June 21)
- The Venerable Fathers martyred at the Monastery of St. Sabbas (796): (Note: See also another group of Sabbaite Fathers commemorated on May 16 († 614).)

- Saints John, Sergius, Patrick, and others

- Saint Nicetas the Confessor, Bishop of Apollonias in Bithynia (813) (Note: "Saint Nicetas the Confessor, Archbishop of Apollonias in Bithynia, was noted for his profound knowledge of Holy Scripture, and was a pious and kindly man. During the reign of the Iconoclast emperor Leo the Armenian (813-820), the saint championed the veneration of holy icons, and so was exiled and died in prison.")

== Pre-Schism Western saints ==
- Saint Urbitius, Bishop of Metz in the east of France (c. 420)
- Saint Tetricus of Langres, Bishop of Langres and uncle of St Gregory of Tours (572)
- Saint Martin of Braga in Iberia (580)
- Venerable Cuthbert of Lindisfarne, Bishop (687) (Note: He was a shepherd boy until he became a monk at Melrose in Scotland. After the Council of Whitby, he went to Lindisfarne where he became Abbot. In March 685, he was consecrated Bishop of Lindisfarne. After his repose his relics were found to be incorrupt and eventually they were taken to Durham. One of the most famous English saints, he is the called the Wonderworker of England. His relics are revered in Durham to this day.)
- Saint Herbert of Derwentwater, an Anglo-Saxon priest and friend of St Cuthbert, who lived as a hermit on St Herbert's Island (687)
- Saint Wulfram of Sens, missionary, Bishop of Sens (703) (Note: Bishop of Sens, he worked to enlighten the Frisians, helped by monks from the monastery of Fontenelle. After many years among the Frisians, he returned to Fontenelle where he reposed. His relics are still in Abbeville in the north of France.)
- Saint Benignus, a monk and Abbot of Fontenelle Abbey (725)
- Saint Remigius von Straßburg, a noble, became Abbot of Münster near Colmar in France and in 776 Bishop of Strasbourg (783) (Note: See: (in German) Remigius von Straßburg. Wikipedia. (German Wikipedia).)
- Saint William of Peñacorada, monk at the monastery of Satagún in León in Spain (c. 1042) (Note: In 988 he fled with the other monks from the Saracens and settled at Peñacorada, where he built the monastery of Santa Maria de los Valles, later named after him San Guillermo de Peñacorada.)

== Post-Schism Orthodox saints ==
- New Hieromartyr Euphrosynus of Blue-Jay Lake, Valaam, Novgorod Republic (1612)
- New Martyr Myron of Mega Castro (Heraklion) in Crete (1793) (Note: The Martyr Myron of Crete suffered under the Turks for his refusal to accept Islam in the year 1793.)

=== New martyrs and confessors ===
- New Hieromartyr Basil Sokolov, Deacon (1938)
- New Hieromartyr Nicholas Holz, priest of Novosiolki, Chełm and Podlasie, Poland (1944)

== Icon gallery ==
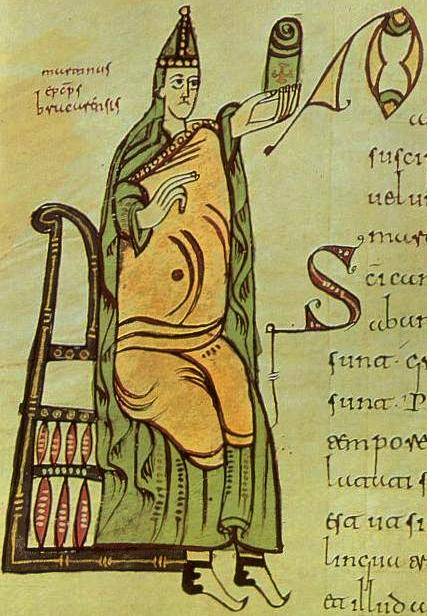
St. Martin of Braga (10th-century manuscript).

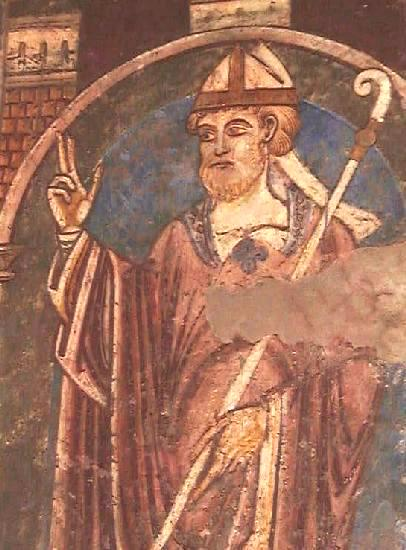
Venerable Cuthbert of Lindisfarne (11th-century fresco).

== Sources ==
- March 20/April 2. Orthodox Calendar (PRAVOSLAVIE.RU).
- April 2 / March 20. HOLY TRINITY RUSSIAN ORTHODOX CHURCH (A parish of the Patriarchate of Moscow).
- March 20. OCA - The Lives of the Saints.
- The Autonomous Orthodox Metropolia of Western Europe and the Americas (ROCOR). St. Hilarion Calendar of Saints for the year of our Lord 2004. St. Hilarion Press (Austin, TX). p. 23.
- March 20. Latin Saints of the Orthodox Patriarchate of Rome.
- The Roman Martyrology. Transl. by the Archbishop of Baltimore. Last Edition, According to the Copy Printed at Rome in 1914. Revised Edition, with the Imprimatur of His Eminence Cardinal Gibbons. Baltimore: John Murphy Company, 1916. pp. 81–82.
- Rev. Richard Stanton. A Menology of England and Wales, or, Brief Memorials of the Ancient British and English Saints Arranged According to the Calendar, Together with the Martyrs of the 16th and 17th Centuries. London: Burns & Oates, 1892. pp. 125–128.

Greek Sources

- Great Synaxaristes: (in Greek) 20 ΜΑΡΤΙΟΥ. ΜΕΓΑΣ ΣΥΝΑΞΑΡΙΣΤΗΣ.
- (in Greek) Συναξαριστής. 20 Μαρτίου. ECCLESIA.GR. (H ΕΚΚΛΗΣΙΑ ΤΗΣ ΕΛΛΑΔΟΣ).

Russian Sources

- (in Russian) 2 апреля (20 марта). Православная Энциклопедия под редакцией Патриарха Московского и всея Руси Кирилла (электронная версия). (Orthodox Encyclopedia - Pravenc.ru).
- (in Russian) 20 марта (ст.ст.) 2 апреля 2013 (нов. ст.). Русская Православная Церковь Отдел внешних церковных связей. (DECR).
