= Eastern Orthodox liturgical calendar =

Liturgical calendar used within Eastern Orthodox churches

The Eastern Orthodox liturgical calendar describes and dictates the rhythm of the life of the Eastern Orthodox Church. Passages of Holy Scripture, saints and events for commemoration are associated with each date, as are many times special rules for fasting or feasting that correspond to the day of the week or time of year in relationship to the major feast days.

There are two types of feasts in the Orthodox Church calendar: fixed and movable. Fixed feasts occur on the same calendar day every year, whereas movable feasts change each year. The moveable feasts are generally relative to Pascha (Easter), and so the cycle of moveable feasts is referred to as the Paschal cycle.

== Fixed feasts ==
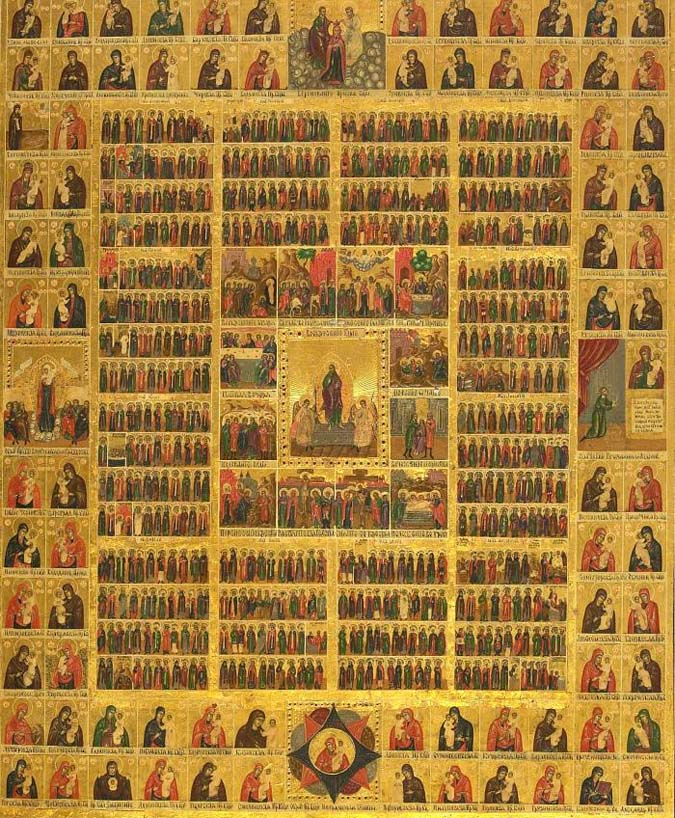
Russian icon depicting the calendar of saints (18th–19th century).

The following list of dates links only to fixed feasts of the Orthodox Church. These are the fixed dates; the particular day on which that date is observed differs depending upon whether one follows the Julian Calendar (sometimes referred to as the "Old Calendar") or the Revised Julian Calendar ("New Calendar"). All dates having to do with Pascha (Easter) - the beginning of Great Lent, Ascension, Pentecost, etc. - are moveable feasts, and thus are not on this calendar (see Paschal cycle).

(For the date in the modern Gregorian Calendar on which churches following the old Julian Calendar celebrate any fixed date's commemoration, add 13 days to the dates below. For example, Christmas Day falls on 25 December on both calendars but 25 December on the old Julian Calendar is the same day as 7 January of the modern Gregorian Calendar. Since March 1900 the number of days by which the Gregorian calendar differs from the Julian calendar is currently 13, but will increase to 14 on 1 March 2100. Over the course of future centuries, the difference will continue to increase, limitlessly.

For those churches which follow the Revised Julian Calendar, the dates below correspond exactly to the dates on the Gregorian Calendar.)

=== Table of dates ===
The Eastern Orthodox liturgical year begins on 1 September.

September	1 2 3 4 5 6 7 8 9 10 11 12 13 14 15 16 17 18 19 20 21 22 23 24 25 26 27 28 29 30
October	1 2 3 4 5 6 7 8 9 10 11 12 13 14 15 16 17 18 19 20 21 22 23 24 25 26 27 28 29 30 31
November	1 2 3 4 5 6 7 8 9 10 11 12 13 14 15 16 17 18 19 20 21 22 23 24 25 26 27 28 29 30
December	1 2 3 4 5 6 7 8 9 10 11 12 13 14 15 16 17 18 19 20 21 22 23 24 25 26 27 28 29 30 31
January	1 2 3 4 5 6 7 8 9 10 11 12 13 14 15 16 17 18 19 20 21 22 23 24 25 26 27 28 29 30 31
February	1 2 3 4 5 6 7 8 9 10 11 12 13 14 15 16 17 18 19 20 21 22 23 24 25 26 27 28 (29)
March	1 2 3 4 5 6 7 8 9 10 11 12 13 14 15 16 17 18 19 20 21 22 23 24 25 26 27 28 29 30 31
April	1 2 3 4 5 6 7 8 9 10 11 12 13 14 15 16 17 18 19 20 21 22 23 24 25 26 27 28 29 30
May	1 2 3 4 5 6 7 8 9 10 11 12 13 14 15 16 17 18 19 20 21 22 23 24 25 26 27 28 29 30 31
June	1 2 3 4 5 6 7 8 9 10 11 12 13 14 15 16 17 18 19 20 21 22 23 24 25 26 27 28 29 30
July	1 2 3 4 5 6 7 8 9 10 11 12 13 14 15 16 17 18 19 20 21 22 23 24 25 26 27 28 29 30 31
August	1 2 3 4 5 6 7 8 9 10 11 12 13 14 15 16 17 18 19 20 21 22 23 24 25 26 27 28 29 30 31

== Moveable feasts ==
Pascha (Easter) is, by far, the most important day in the ecclesiastical year, and all other days, in one way or another, are dependent upon it. Pascha falls on different calendar dates from year to year, calculated according to a strict set of rules (see Computus for details). While the Fixed Cycle begins on September 1, the new Paschal Cycle begins on "Zaccheus Sunday" in the Slavic tradition or the "Sunday of the Canaanite Woman" in the Greek tradition (the beginning of the preparatory season before Great Lent), eleven Sundays before Pascha, and continues until the Zaccheus Sunday or Sunday of the Canaanite Woman of the following year. The Epistle and Gospel readings at the Divine Liturgy throughout the year are determined by the date of Pascha.

== Great Feasts ==
There are Twelve Great Feasts throughout the church year—not counting Pascha, which is above and beyond all other feast days. These are feasts which celebrate major historical events in the lives of Jesus Christ or the Theotokos (Virgin Mary). Of these, three are on the Paschal Cycle:

- The Entry into Jerusalem (Flowery/Willow/Palm Sunday), the Sunday before Pascha
- The Ascension of Christ, forty days after Pascha
- Pentecost, fifty days after Pascha

The other Great Feasts are on the Fixed Cycle:

- The Nativity of the Theotokos, 21 September [O.S. 8 September]
- The Exaltation of the Cross (Roodmas), 27 September [O.S. 14 September]
- The Presentation of the Theotokos, 4 December [O.S. 21 November]
- The Nativity of the Lord (Christmas), 7 January [O.S. 25 December]
- The Baptism of Christ (Theophany, also called Epiphany), 19 January [O.S. 6 January]
- The Presentation of Jesus at the Temple (Candlemas), 15 February [O.S. 2 February]
- The Annunciation, 7 April [O.S. 25 March]
- The Transfiguration of Jesus, 19 August [O.S. 6 August]
- The Dormition of the Theotokos, 28 August [O.S. 15 August]

In addition, the feast day of the patron saint of a parish church or monastery is counted as a Great Feast, and is celebrated with great solemnity.

== Liturgical seasons ==
In addition to Great Lent, there are three other lesser lenten seasons in the church year:

- Nativity Fast (40 days in preparation for the Feast of the Nativity of our Lord)
- Apostles' Fast (variable time from the second Monday after Pentecost until the Feast of Saints Peter and Paul)
- Dormition Fast (2 weeks from 1 August to 14 August in preparation for the Feast of the Dormition of the Theotokos)

The season from the Sunday of the Publican and Pharisee (three weeks before the Great Lent) through Holy Saturday is called Triodion, while the season from Pascha through Pentecost is called the Pentecostarion.

== Printed calendars ==
Because of the complexity created by the intersection of the various cycles, a number of Orthodox institutions will print an annual calendar which contains rubrics for the services during that particular year. Simpler wall calendars will show the major commemoration of the day together with the appointed scripture readings.

== See also ==
- Byzantine calendar
- List of Eastern Orthodox saint titles
