= Nicetas the Patrician =

Byzantine official and saint (761/62–836)

Niketas the Patrician
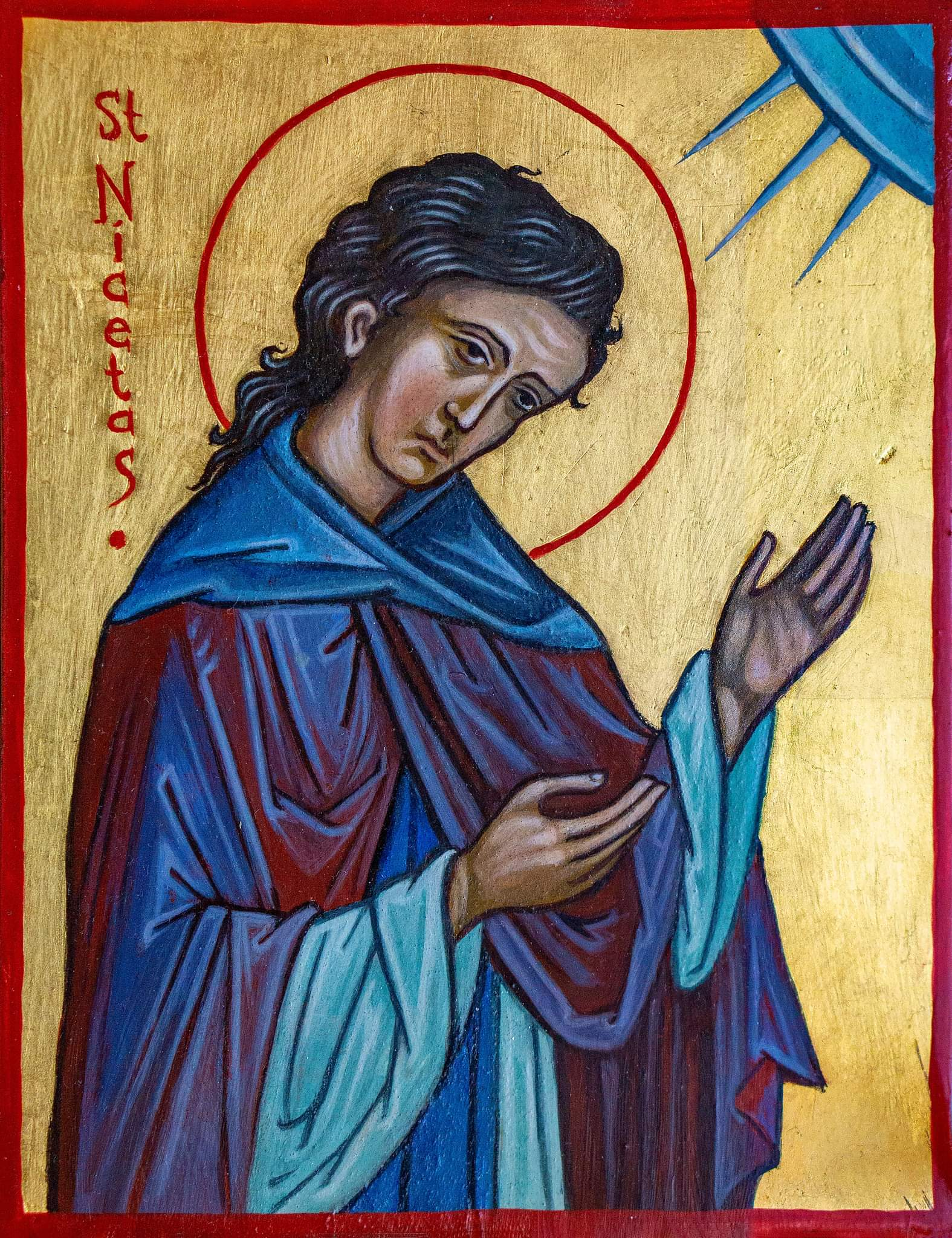
- Icon of St. Nicetas the Patrician

Confessor of the Faith
- Born: 761 or 762
- Died: 6 October 836; Katesia, Byzantine Empire
- Venerated in: Eastern Orthodoxy
- Feast: 13 October
- Attributes: Monastic vestment

Saint Nicetas the Patrician (Greek: Νικήτας Πατρίκιος, romanized: Niketas Patrikios; 761/62 – 6 October 836) was a Byzantine monk and a fervent opponent of Byzantine Iconoclasm. He is usually identified with Nicetas Monomachos (Νικήτας Μονομάχος), a eunuch official and general from Paphlagonia active at the turn of the 9th century.

He is honoured as a saint and a Confessor of the Faith by the Eastern Orthodox Church. His feast day is on 13 October.

== Early life and career ==
Nicetas was born in Paphlagonia in 761/62, and his parents were probably named Gregory and Anna. Later tradition held that he was a descendant of Empress Theodora, the wife of Theophilos (r. 829–842). This is clearly impossible, but some sort of relation cannot be excluded. Another tradition records that he was also a relative of Empress Irene of Athens (r. 797–802). According to his hagiography, he was castrated by his parents at a young age, received a good education and was sent to Constantinople at age 17 (c. 778), where he entered the service of the imperial court. According to the same source, Nicetas distinguished himself among the court eunuchs and came to the attention of Empress-mother Irene, who handled the Empire's affairs as regent after 780. Irene promoted him because of his ability and because of their ties of kinship. In 787, Nicetas is even said to have represented the Empress at the Second Council of Nicaea, although given Nicetas' youth this is likely to be an invention by his hagiographer.

Shortly after, he was promoted to the rank of patrikios, and was sent to Sicily as the governor (strategos) of the local theme. On account of this information, he is usually identified with the patrikios and strategos of Sicily Nicetas, who in 797 sent an embassy to Charlemagne, as well as with the patrikios Nicetas Monomachos, who brought the hand of Saint Euphemia from Constantinople c. 796 and built a church in Sicily to house the holy relic. Nicetas' tenure as governor of Sicily is therefore placed c. 797, and ended before 799, when a certain Michael was governor of the Theme of Sicily. If "Monomachos" represents a family name rather than a sobriquet (it means "single combatant"), Nicetas would be the first attested member of the Monomachos family, which rose to prominence in the 11th century, with several of its members becoming high-ranking functionaries, and which also produced an emperor, Constantine IX Monomachos (r. 1042–1055).

Almost nothing is known of Nicetas' activities in the decade after the deposition of Irene in 802. According to his hagiography, he wanted to retire to a monastery, but was prohibited from doing so by Emperor Nikephoros I (r. 802–811) and his son Staurakios. However, he has been tentatively identified with a number of people of the same name and rank mentioned in the chronicles: thus he may be the patrikios Nicetas who owned the house where the Gastria Monastery was later built, or the patrikios Nicetas who was one of the founders of the Church of St. Stephen in Trigleia, Bithynia. He is also frequently equated with the admiral Nicetas who in 807–808 led the Byzantine fleet in its reoccupation of Dalmatia and Venice, who in turn is sometimes identified with the Nicetas who was General Logothete in 808–811.

== Monastic life ==
With the accession of Michael I Rhangabe (r. 811–813) to the throne, Nicetas was at last able to receive tonsure (late 811). Indeed, the new emperor encouraged him in this endeavour, served as his sponsor, and gave him the convent of Chrysonike near the Golden Gate, where Nicetas retired. Nicetas remained in the monastery as its hegumenos (abbot) until late 815, when the second phase of the Byzantine Iconoclasm began under the auspices of Leo V the Armenian (r. 813–820). Refusing to acknowledge the Emperor's iconoclast policies, Nicetas left the capital for one of its suburbs. He was accused at one point of sheltering an icon, but he suffered no punishment except for the confiscation of the image and his confinement to house arrest.

Nothing is known of his life during the reign of Michael II the Amorian (r. 820–829), but in the early reign of Michael's son and successor Theophilos, the persecution of iconophiles intensified, and monks in particular became the targets of the emperor's iconoclast zeal. Despite his probable family connection to Theophilos' empress, Nicetas was ordered to accept communion with the iconoclast patriarch, Antony Kassymatas, or face exile. Nicetas chose the latter, and with a handful of disciples and other like-minded monks he fled to Bithynia. He spent the next few years moving from locality to locality around the coast of the Sea of Marmara to evade harassment from iconoclast officials, before finally settling in the villages of Zouloupas and then Katesia, where he died on 6 October 836. According to the sources, Nicetas specialized in "healing men tormented by sexual desires" (K. Ringrose).

== Hagiographic sources ==
The main sources on Nicetas are his hagiography and the synaxaria. The hagiography survives in a 12th-century manuscript, now located in the National Library of Greece at Athens. It was formerly attributed to Nicetas of Medikion, but was written by an anonymous monk of the Monastery of the Archangels (Μονή Ασωμάτων) at Katesia, founded by Nicetas, sometime shortly after Nicetas' death. The account was based on the notes of Nicetas' namesake nephew and disciple, who succeeded him as the monastery's abbot.

== Sources ==
- Banev, Gencho (2003). "Νικήτας Πατρίκιος". Encyclopedia of the Hellenic World, Asia Minor (in Greek). Foundation of the Hellenic World.
- Kazhdan, Alexander (1991). "Monomachos". In Kazhdan, Alexander (ed.). The Oxford Dictionary of Byzantium. Oxford and New York: Oxford University Press. p. 1398. ISBN 0-19-504652-8.
- Lilie, Ralph Johannes (1996). Byzanz unter Eirene und Konstantin VI. (780–802) (in German). Frankfurt am Main: Peter Lang. ISBN 3-631-30582-6.
- Lilie, Ralph-Johannes; Ludwig, Claudia; Pratsch, Thomas; Zielke, Beate (2013). Prosopographie der mittelbyzantinischen Zeit Online. Berlin-Brandenburgische Akademie der Wissenschaften. Nach Vorarbeiten F. Winkelmanns erstellt (in German). Berlin and Boston: De Gruyter.
- Papachryssanthou, Denise (1968). "Un confesseur du second iconoclasme: la vie de du patrice Nicetas (†836)". Travaux et Mémoires III (in French). pp. 309–351.
- Ringrose, Kathryn M. (2003). The Perfect Servant: Eunuchs and the Social Construction of Gender in Byzantium. Chicago, Illinois: The University of Chicago Press. ISBN 978-0-226-72015-9.
- Treadgold, Warren (1988). The Byzantine Revival, 780–842. Stanford, California: Stanford University Press. ISBN 978-0-8047-1462-4.
