= April 16 (Eastern Orthodox liturgics) =

Day in the Eastern Orthodox liturgical calendar

Eastern Orthodox liturgical calendar
April 15	April 16	April 17
April 16 O.S. ≍ April 29 N.S. April 16 N.S ≍ April 3 O.S.

An Eastern Orthodox cross

April 16 in Eastern Orthodox liturgical calendars is a feast day and a day of commemoration of saints and martyrs. Although some Orthodox churches use the Revised Julian Calendar and others use the traditional Julian calendar, the fixed commemorations for their respective April 16 are broadly the same, no matter which calendar is used. (Note: Despite the dates being the same, the days to which they refer typically differ by 13 days. The notation Old Style or O.S. is sometimes used to indicate a date in the traditional Julian Calendar (the "Old Calendar"). The notation New Style or N.S. indicates a date in the Revised Julian calendar (the "New Calendar").)

== Saints ==
- Martyrs Leonidas of Nea Epidavros, and those with him (250 or 258): (Note: Name days celebrated today include: Galina (Γαλήνη).)

- Charissa, Nika (Niki), Galina, Callista (Calisa, Calida), Nunechia, Basilissa, Theodora, and Irene, of Corinth.

- Hieromartyrs Felix, Bishop of Spoleto, (Note: See also: May 18.) and Januarius, Presbyter, and Martyrs Septeminus and Fortunatus, of Lycaonia (294 or 304) (see also: August 30)
- Virgin-martyrs Agape, Irene, and Chionia of Aquileia, in Thessaloniki (304) (Note: Name days celebrated today include: Chionia, Sonia (Χιονία).) (see also: April 3)
- Saints Agatho, Eutychia, Cassia and Phillippa, the Confessors, in Thessaloniki, by imprisonment (304)

== Pre-Schism Western saints ==
- Virgin-martyr Encratia (Encratis, Encratide, Engracia), who suffered terribly for her faith in Saragossa in Spain (c. 304) (Note: A virgin who suffered terribly for Orthodoxy in Saragossa in Spain, where a church dedicated to her now exists. She was famous for 'her ardour in suffering for Christ'. Though counted a martyr, she outlived her torments.) (Note: "In the same place, St. Encratis, a virgin and martyr who had her body lacerated, her breasts cut off, and her liver plucked out. As she survived these torments, she was confined in a prison until her ulcerated flesh putrefied.")
- The Eighteen Martyrs of Saragossa (c. 304): (Note: "At Saragossa, in Spain, the birth day of eighteen holy martyrs, Optatus, Lupercus, Successus, Martial, Urbanus, Julia, Quinctilian, Pubilus, Fronto, Felix, Caecilian, Eventius, Primitivus, Apodemius, and four others, who, it is said, bore the name of Saturninus. Under Dacian, governor of Spain, they were all together subjected to torments and slain. The glory of their martyrdom has been celebrated in verse by Prudentius.") (see also: November 3)

- Optatus, Lupercus, Successus, Martial, Urban, Julia, Quintilian, Publius, Fronto, Felix, Caecilian, Eventius, Primitivus, Apodemius and four named Saturninus.

- Saint Turibius of Astorga, Bishop of Astorga in Spain and a valiant defender of Orthodoxy (c. 460)
- Saint Vasius (Vaise, Vaize), a rich citizen of Saintes in France, murdered by his relatives for giving his property to the poor (c. 500)
- Saint Turibius of Palencia, founder of the monastery of Liébana in Asturias in Spain (c. 528) (Note: "At Palencia, St. Turibius, bishop of Astorga, who with the aid of pope St. Leo, drove the heresy of Priscillian entirely out of Spain, and went to rest in the Lord with a great renown for miracles.")
- Saint Paternus (Pair), Bishop of Avranches (c. 574 or 563) (see also: April 15)
- Saint Fructuosus of Braga in Iberia (665) (Note: Born in Spain, he became a monk and then a hermit in the Vierzo Mountains, where disciples gathered around him. Fructuosus was eventually forced to become Bishop of Dumium and later Archbishop of Braga.)
- Saint Lambert of Saragossa, a servant who was martyred near Saragossa by his Saracen master (c. 900)
- Saint Herveus of Tours (Hervé), monk at the monastery of St Martin of Tours, and hermit (1021)
- Saint Elias, Monk and Abbot in Ireland and Germany (1042) (Note: Born in Ireland, he became monk and abbot in 1020 of the Irish monasteries of St Martin the Great and St Pantaleon in Cologne in Germany.)

== Post-Schism Orthodox saints ==
- Saint Theodora-Bassa, princess of Novgorod (1378) (Note: The Synaxaristes list her death date as 1347.)
- Saint John, Fool-for-Christ, of Verkhoturye (1701)
- New Martyr Michael Burliotes of Smyrna, by beheading (1772)
- New Monk-martyr Christopher of Dionysiou, Mt. Athos, at Adrianople (1818)
- New martyrs Christodoulos and Anastasia, in Achaia (1821)
- Saint Ambrose (Khelaia) the Confessor, Catholicos-Patriarch of All Georgia (1927) (see also: March 16 and March 27)
- Venerable Amphilochios (Makris), Elder, of Patmos (1970) (Note: He was glorified by the Holy Synod of the Ecumenical Patriarchate of Constantinople on August 29, 2018: (in Greek) α) Εἰσηγήσει τῆς Κανονικῆς Ἐπιτροπῆς συμπεριελήφθη εἰς τό Ἁγιολόγιον τῆς Ὀρθοδόξου Ἐκκλησίας ὁ ἐν Πάτμῳ ἀσκήσας καί ἀναπτύξας μέγα πνευματικόν καί κοινωφελές ἔργον ἐν Δωδεκανήσῳ, Κρήτῃ καί ἀλλαχοῦ Ἀρχιμανδρίτης Ἀμφιλόχιος Μακρῆς, διατελέσας Ἡγούμενος τῆς ἱστορικῆς Ἱερᾶς Μονῆς Ἁγίου Ἰωάννου τοῦ Θεολόγου καί Πατριαρχικός Ἔξαρχος Πάτμου, ὅστις καί ἵδρυσε τήν ἐν τῇ Νήσῳ γυναικείαν Ἱεράν Μονήν Εὐαγγελισμοῦ Μητρός Ἠγαπημένου.) (see also: April 3 - os)

== Other commemorations ==
- Synaxis of the Weeping Icon of the Most Holy Theotokos "Ilyin Chernigov" (1658) (see also: September 1)
- Synaxis of the Icon of the Mother of God of Tambov (1692)

== Icon gallery ==
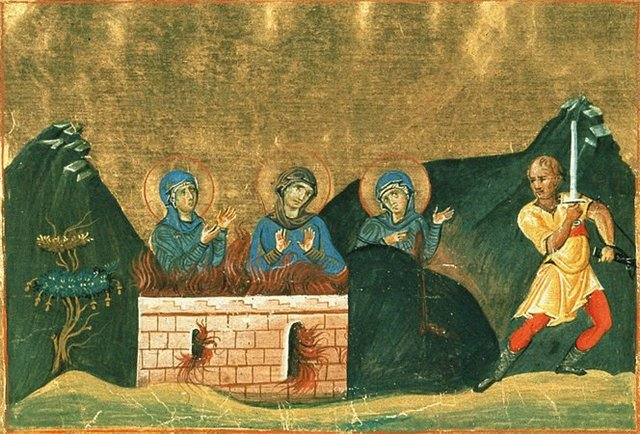
Virgin-martyrs Agape, Irene, and Chionia.
(Menologion of Basil II, 10th century).

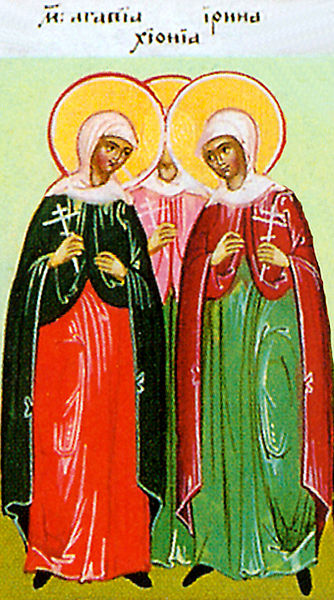
Virgin-martyrs Agape, Irene, and Chionia.

== Sources ==
- April 16 / April 29. Orthodox Calendar (pravoslavie.ru).
- April 29 / April 16. Holy Trinity Russian Orthodox Church (A parish of the Patriarchate of Moscow).
- April 16. OCA - The Lives of the Saints.
- The Autonomous Orthodox Metropolia of Western Europe and the Americas. St. Hilarion Calendar of Saints for the year of our Lord 2004. St. Hilarion Press (Austin, TX). p. 29.
- April 16. Latin Saints of the Orthodox Patriarchate of Rome.
- The Roman Martyrology. Transl. by the Archbishop of Baltimore. Last Edition, According to the Copy Printed at Rome in 1914. Revised Edition, with the Imprimatur of His Eminence Cardinal Gibbons. Baltimore: John Murphy Company, 1916. pp. 106–107.

Greek Sources

- Great Synaxaristes: (in Greek) 16 Απριλίου. Μεγασ Συναξαριστησ.
- (in Greek) Συναξαριστής. 16 Απριλίου. ecclesia.gr. (H Εκκλησια Τησ Ελλαδοσ).

Russian Sources

- (in Russian) 29 апреля (16 апреля). Православная Энциклопедия под редакцией Патриарха Московского и всея Руси Кирилла (электронная версия). (Orthodox Encyclopedia - Pravenc.ru).
- (in Russian) 16 апреля (ст.ст.) 29 апреля 2013 (нов. ст.). Русская Православная Церковь Отдел внешних церковных связей.
