= April 14 (Eastern Orthodox liturgics) =

Day in the Eastern Orthodox liturgical calendar

Eastern Orthodox liturgical calendar
April 13	April 14	April 15
April 14 O.S. ≍ April 27 N.S. April 14 N.S ≍ April 1 O.S.

An Eastern Orthodox cross

April 14 in Eastern Orthodox liturgical calendars is a feast day and a day of commemoration of saints and martyrs. Although some Orthodox churches use the Revised Julian Calendar and others use the traditional Julian calendar, the fixed commemorations for their respective April 14 are broadly the same, no matter which calendar is used. (Note: Despite the dates being the same, the days to which they refer typically differ by 13 days. The notation Old Style or O.S. is sometimes used to indicate a date in the traditional Julian Calendar (the "Old Calendar"). The notation New Style or N.S. indicates a date in the Revised Julian calendar (the "New Calendar").)

== Saints ==
- Apostles Aristarchus of Apamea, Pudens, and Trophimus of the Seventy Apostles (c. 67) (see also: April 15 - Slavic)
- Martyr Ardalion the Actor, who suffered under Maximian (c. 305-311)
- Martyr Azat the Eunuch and 1,000 Martyrs of Persia under Shapur II (341) (Note: Azad, a eunuch and companion in martyrdom of Saint Simeon Barsabae (April 17).)
- Martyr Thomais of Alexandria (476) (see also April 13 - Slavic)
- Saint St Martin the Confessor, Pope of Rome (655) (see also April 13 - Greek, and West)
- Venerable martyr Christopher the Sabbaite, of St. Sabbas’ Monastery (797) (see also April 13 - Greek)

== Pre-Schism Western saints ==
- Virgin-martyr Domnina of Terni and Companions, martyred in Terni in Italy at the same time as Bishop Valentine (c. 269)
- Martyrs Tiburtius, Valerian and Maximus, in Rome (3rd century)
- Saint Tassach, one of St Patrick's earliest disciples and first Bishop of Raholp, Ireland (c. 495)
- Saint Abundius the Sacristan, a sacrist at St Peter's in Rome (c. 564)
- Saint Lambert of Lyon, Abbot of Fontenelle and Bishop of Lyon (688) (Note: Born in the north of France, he became a monk at Fontenelle with St Wandrille whom he succeeded as abbot in 666. In 678 he became Bishop of Lyon.)

== Post-Schism Orthodox saints ==
- Saint Vsevolod III Yuryevich the Big Nest, (Demetrius in holy baptism), Great Prince of Vladimir (1212)
- Martyrs Anthony, John, and Eustathios, of Vilnius, Lithuania (1347)
- New Martyr Demetrius of the Peloponnese, at Tripolis (1803)

=== New martyrs and confessors ===
- New Martyr Sergius (Trofimov) of Nizhni-Novgorod and companion (1918)
- New Hieromartyr Alexander Orlov, Confessor, Priest (1941) (Note: See: (in Russian) Орлов, Александр Васильевич (1878-1941). Википедии. (Russian Wikipedia).)

== Other commemorations ==
- Synaxis of the Icon of the Mother of God of Vilnius (1465) (Note: The Vilnius icon is also commemorated on February 15.)

== Icon gallery ==
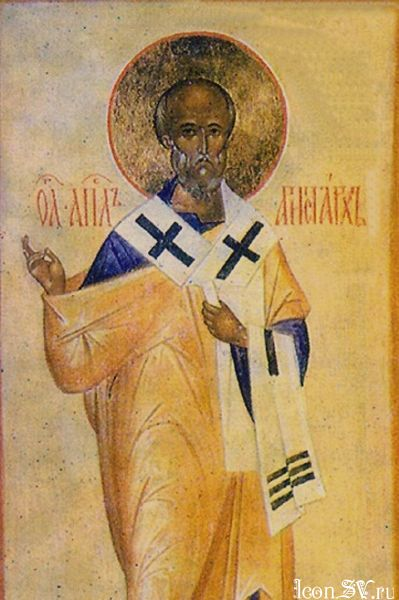
St. Aristarchus of Thessalonica (Aristarchus of Apamea).

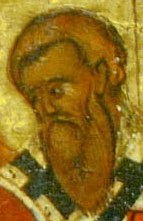
St. Pudens.

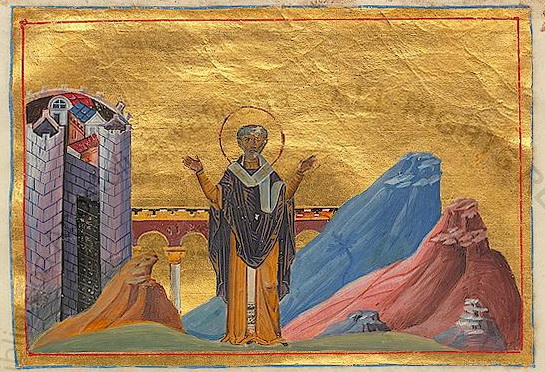
Saint Martin the Confessor (Menologion of Basil II)

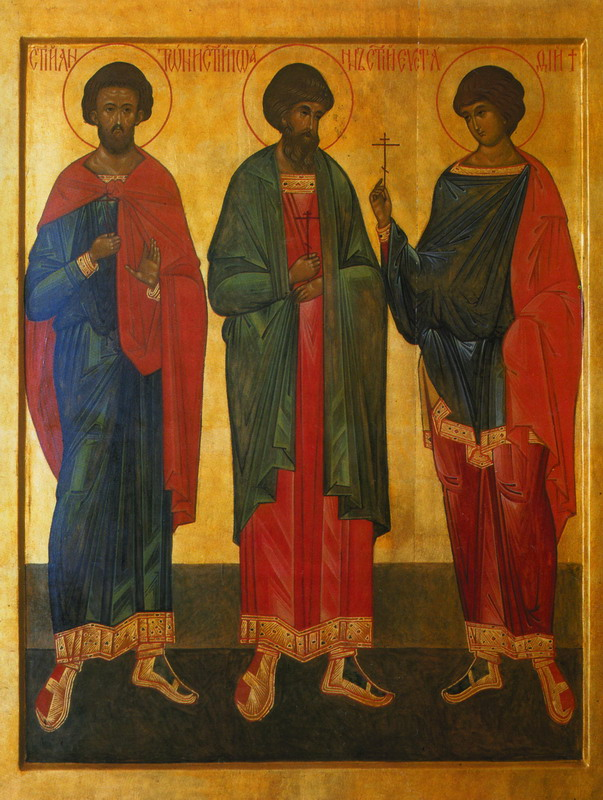
Martyrs of Vilnius, Sts. Anthony, John, and Eustathios.

== Sources ==
- April 14 / April 27. Orthodox Calendar (pravoslavie.ru).
- April 27 / April 14. Holy Trinity Russian Orthodox Church (A parish of the Patriarchate of Moscow).
- April 14. OCA - The Lives of the Saints.
- The Autonomous Orthodox Metropolia of Western Europe and the Americas. St. Hilarion Calendar of Saints for the year of our Lord 2004. St. Hilarion Press (Austin, TX). p. 28.
- April 14. Latin Saints of the Orthodox Patriarchate of Rome.
- The Roman Martyrology. Transl. by the Archbishop of Baltimore. Last Edition, According to the Copy Printed at Rome in 1914. Revised Edition, with the Imprimatur of His Eminence Cardinal Gibbons. Baltimore: John Murphy Company, 1916. p. 105.

Greek Sources

- Great Synaxaristes: (in Greek) 14 Απριλιου. Μεγασ Συναξαριστησ.
- (in Greek) Συναξαριστής. 14 Απριλίου. ecclesia.gr. (H Εκκλησια Τησ Ελλαδοσ).

Russian Sources

- (in Russian) 27 апреля (14 апреля). Православная Энциклопедия под редакцией Патриарха Московского и всея Руси Кирилла (электронная версия). (Orthodox Encyclopedia - Pravenc.ru).
- (in Russian) Русская Православная Церковь Православный Церковный календарь на 2023 год.
