= March 21 (Eastern Orthodox liturgics) =

Day in the Eastern Orthodox liturgical calendar

Eastern Orthodox liturgical calendar
March 20	March 21	March 22
March 21 O.S. ≍ April 3 N.S. March 21 N.S ≍ March 8 O.S.

An Eastern Orthodox cross

March 21 in Eastern Orthodox liturgical calendars is a feast day and a day of commemoration of saints and martyrs. Although some Orthodox churches use the Revised Julian Calendar and others use the traditional Julian calendar, the fixed commemorations for their respective March 21 are broadly the same, no matter which calendar is used. (Note: Despite the dates being the same, the days to which they refer typically differ by 13 days. The notation Old Style or O.S. is sometimes used to indicate a date in the traditional Julian Calendar (the "Old Calendar"). The notation New Style or N.S. indicates a date in the Revised Julian calendar (the "New Calendar").)

== Saints ==
- Martyrs Philemon and Domninus of Thessalonica, in Italy. (see also: March 26)
- Saint Maria the Martyr, in Perge. (Note: Saint Maria the Martyr is unknown in the Synaxaristes. However her memory is recorded in the Lavreotic Codex, as well as in the hymn in which the martyr is glorified as a "beautiful victor" (Greek: καλλίνικος), which was probably composed by the hymnographer Theophanes the Confessor.)
- Saint Serapion, Bishop of Thmuis, Egypt (c. 358) (Note: "A companion of St Antony the Great, he lived in the Nitrian desert, in charge of the monastery of Arsina which contained 11,000 monks. Palladius and Sozomenes gave him the title "the Great". He entered into rest in about 366. St Serapion wrote: "Do not think that sickness is grave; only sin is grave... Sickness leads us only to the tomb, but sin follows the sinner beyond it"." (Prologue))
- Venerable Serapion the Sindonite, monk of Egypt (5th century) (see also: May 14)
- Saint Sophronius, Abbot of the Monastery of St. Theodosius, in Palestine (542)
- Saint Thomas, Patriarch of Constantinople (610) (Note: Ancient manuscripts record his memory as being celebrated on the 18th and 22nd of February, and on March 19, 20, and 22. Parisian Codex 1587, and St Petersburg Codex 227, refer to the translation of his relics on the 19th and 20th of March.)
- Venerable Jacob the Confessor (James the Confessor), Bishop, of the Studion (late 8th century) (Note: "This Saint took up the monastic life from his youth in the Monastery of Studium, where he became a disciple of Saint Theodore the Studite. Later he became bishop and suffered many afflictions and torments at the hands of the Iconoclasts. Saint Theodore composed a homily in honour of this Saint James (PG 99, 1353–1356)." Saint Theodore the Studite refers to a certain Jacob the Confessor who died in the year 818 AD, but there is no mention made as to whether he was bishop.)

== Pre-Schism Western saints ==
- Saint Beryllus, Bishop of Catania (c. 90) (Note: A service to St. Beryllus was composed by Saints Theophanes and Joseph the Hymnographer.) (Note: In Slavonic and Georgian calendars erroneously named as Cyril.)
- Saint Lupicinus of Condat, desert-dweller of the Jura Mountains, Gaul (480) (Note: Brother of St Romanus of Condat, with whom he founded the monasteries of St Claud (Condat) in the Jura, and Lauconne.)
- Saint Enda of Aran, Abbot of Arranmore, monk, earliest leader of Irish monasticism (530) (Note: Brother of St Fanchea, he was the earliest founder of monasteries in Ireland, of which the main one was on Inishmore. Sts Kieran and Brendan were among his disciples.)

== Post-Schism Orthodox saints ==
- New Martyr Michael of Agrapha (Michael of Soluneia), at Thessalonica (1544 or 1547)
- Venerable Seraphim of Vyritsa (1949) (Note: See: (in Russian) Серафим Вырицкий. Википе́дия. Russian Wikipedia.)

=== New martyrs and confessors ===
- New Hieromartyr Vladimir Vvedensky, Priest (1931)
- New Hieromartyr Theodore (Pozdeyevsky), Archbishop (1938) (Note: See: (in Russian) Феодор (Поздеевский). Википе́дия. Russian Wikipedia.: Собором Русской православной церкви за границей в 1981 году был канонизован как священномученик и исповедник.) (see also: October 10)

== Other commemorations ==
- Glorification of Venerable Pachomius, Abbot, of Nerekhta (1384) (see also: May 15)

== Gallery ==
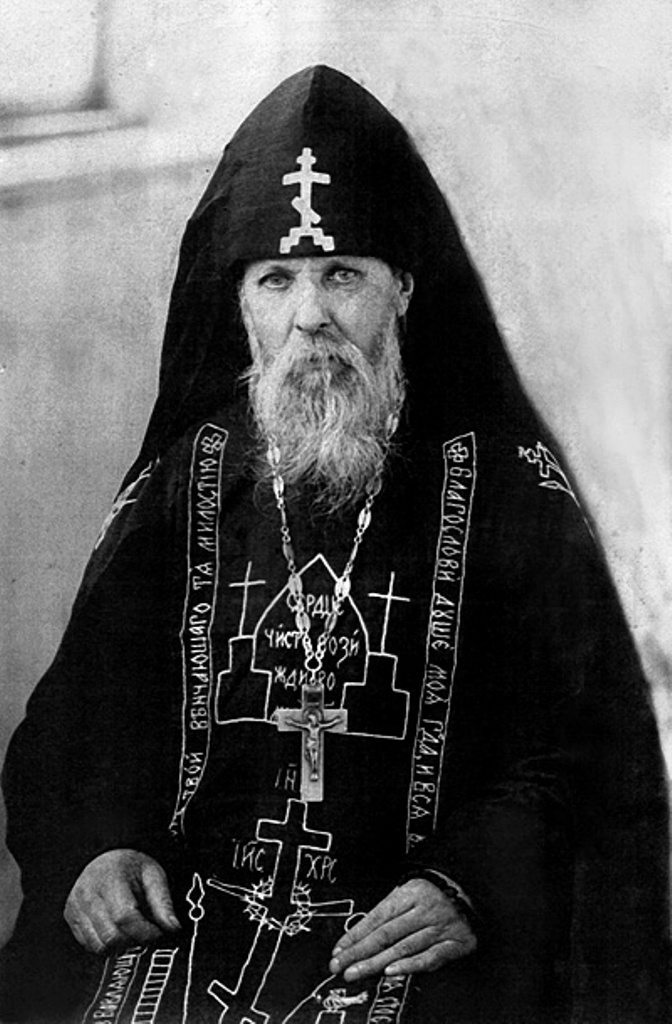
Venerable Seraphim of Vyritsa.

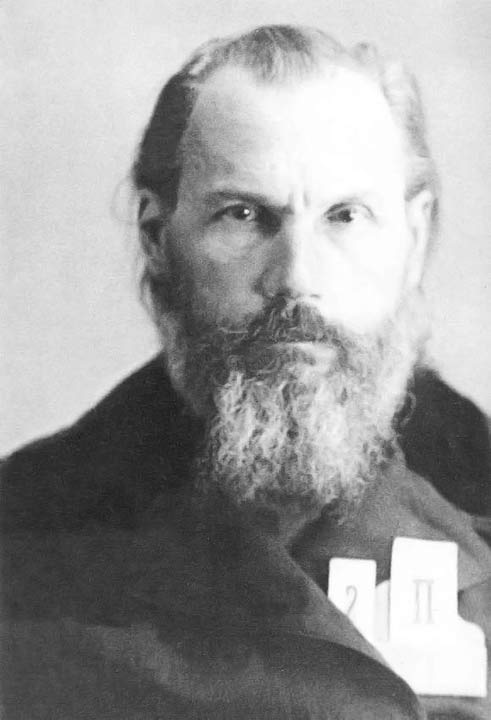
New Hieromartyr Theodore (Pozdeyevsky), Archbishop.

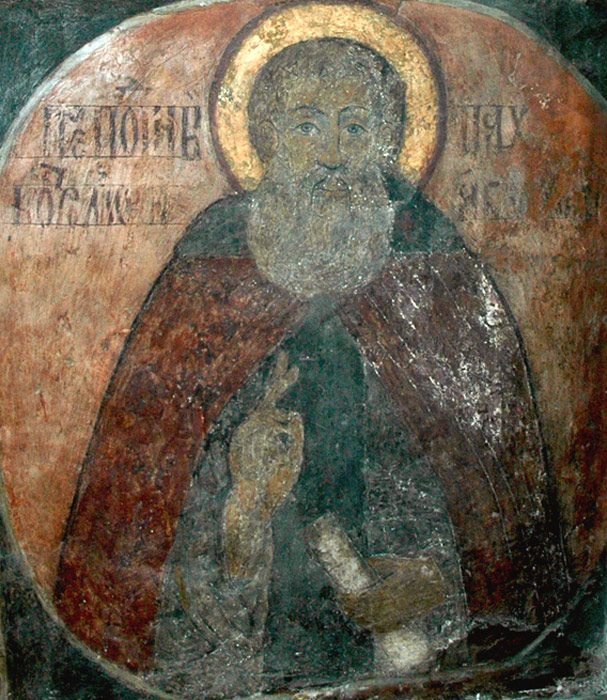
Venerable Pachomius, Abbot, of Nerekhta.

== Sources ==
- March 21/April 3. Orthodox Calendar (PRAVOSLAVIE.RU).
- April 3 / March 21. HOLY TRINITY RUSSIAN ORTHODOX CHURCH (A parish of the Patriarchate of Moscow).
- March 21. OCA – The Lives of the Saints.
- The Autonomous Orthodox Metropolia of Western Europe and the Americas (ROCOR). St. Hilarion Calendar of Saints for the year of our Lord 2004. St. Hilarion Press (Austin, TX). p. 23.
- March 21. Latin Saints of the Orthodox Patriarchate of Rome.
- The Roman Martyrology. Transl. by the Archbishop of Baltimore. Last Edition, According to the Copy Printed at Rome in 1914. Revised Edition, with the Imprimatur of His Eminence Cardinal Gibbons. Baltimore: John Murphy Company, 1916. pp. 82–83.

Greek Sources

- Great Synaxaristes: (in Greek) 21 ΜΑΡΤΙΟΥ. ΜΕΓΑΣ ΣΥΝΑΞΑΡΙΣΤΗΣ.
- (in Greek) Συναξαριστής. 21 Μαρτίου. ECCLESIA.GR. (H ΕΚΚΛΗΣΙΑ ΤΗΣ ΕΛΛΑΔΟΣ).

Russian Sources

- (in Russian) 3 апреля (21 марта). Православная Энциклопедия под редакцией Патриарха Московского и всея Руси Кирилла (электронная версия). (Orthodox Encyclopedia – Pravenc.ru).
- (in Russian) 21 марта (ст.ст.) 3 апреля 2013 (нов. ст.). Русская Православная Церковь Отдел внешних церковных связей. (DECR).
