= Basilissa and Anastasia =

Early Christian Martyrs & Saints

Saints Basilissa and Anastasia
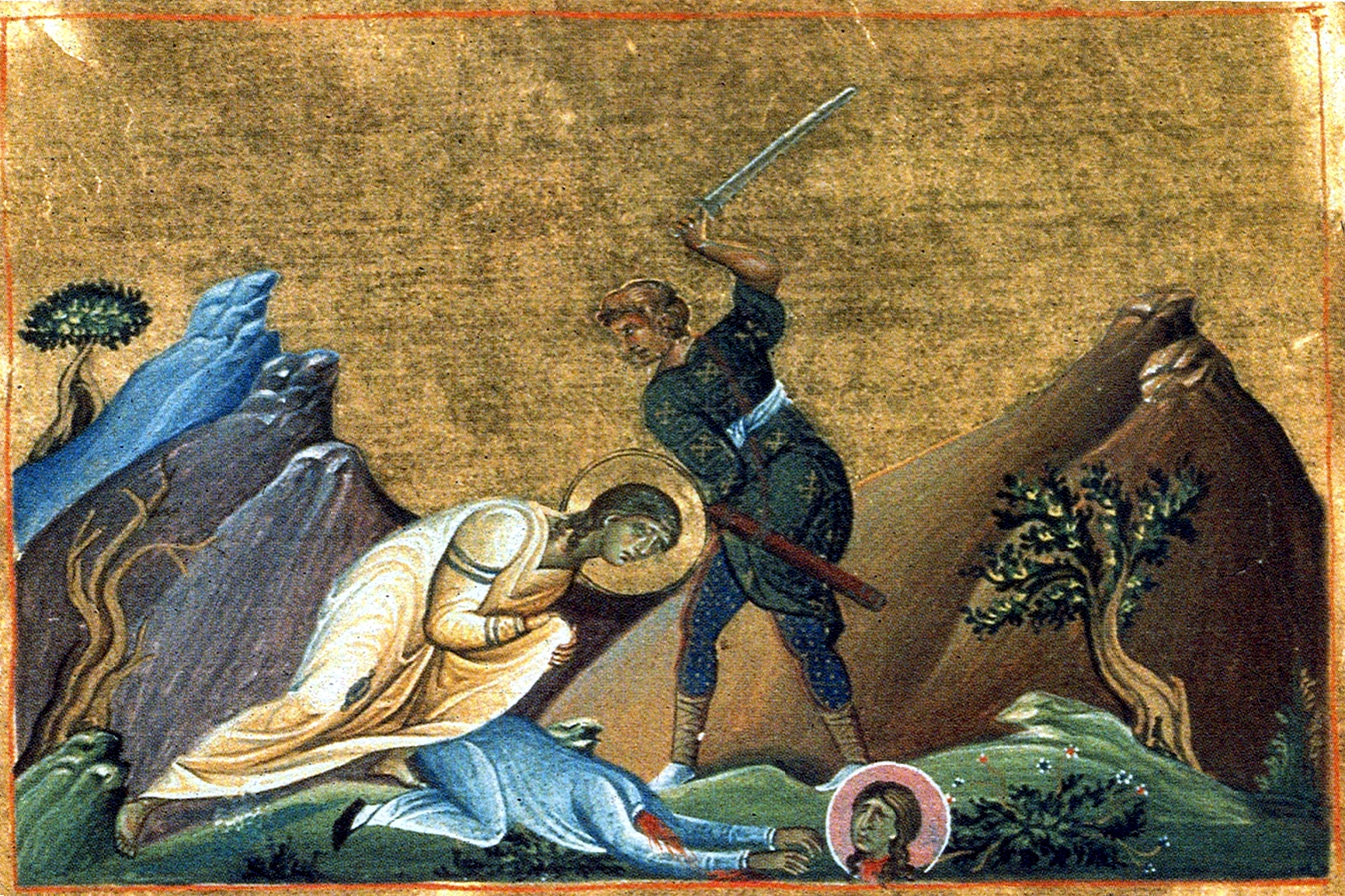

Martyrs
- Born: 1st century AD; Rome
- Died: 68 AD; Rome, Roman Empire
- Venerated in: Orthodox Church; Roman Catholic Church
- Canonized: Pre-Congregation
- Feast: April 15
- Patronage: Tailors

Basilissa and Anastasia (died 68 AD) are early Christian martyrs of Rome, put to death during the reign of Nero. They were among the first converts to Christianity in the 1st century after Christ.

Basilissa and Anastasia were described as "Roman matrons of high rank and great wealth". They were disciples of and might have been baptized by the apostles Peter and Paul, and might have given them "honorable burials" after Peter and Paul's martyrdom in Rome on the same day in 67 AD. The location of the two tombs eventually became St. Peter's Basilica and the Basilica of St. Paul Outside the Walls. The burials might have exposed Basilissa and Anastasia to more persecution, and they were arrested for collecting the relics of and burying the bodies of other martyred Christians. They refused to recant their Christian faith and were beheaded with swords by order of Nero in 68 AD, after being tortured, including having their tongues torn out, their skins scraped with hooks, being burned with fire, and their breasts and feet cut off. Their relics are at Santa Maria della Pace Church in Rome.

Their feast is April 15, are venerated by both the Orthodox Church and Roman Catholic Church, and are honored as the patron saints of tailors. A statue of Basilissa is among the statues that line the colonnade overlooking St. Peter's Square in Rome.
