= Theodora (Roman martyr) =

Saint Theodora
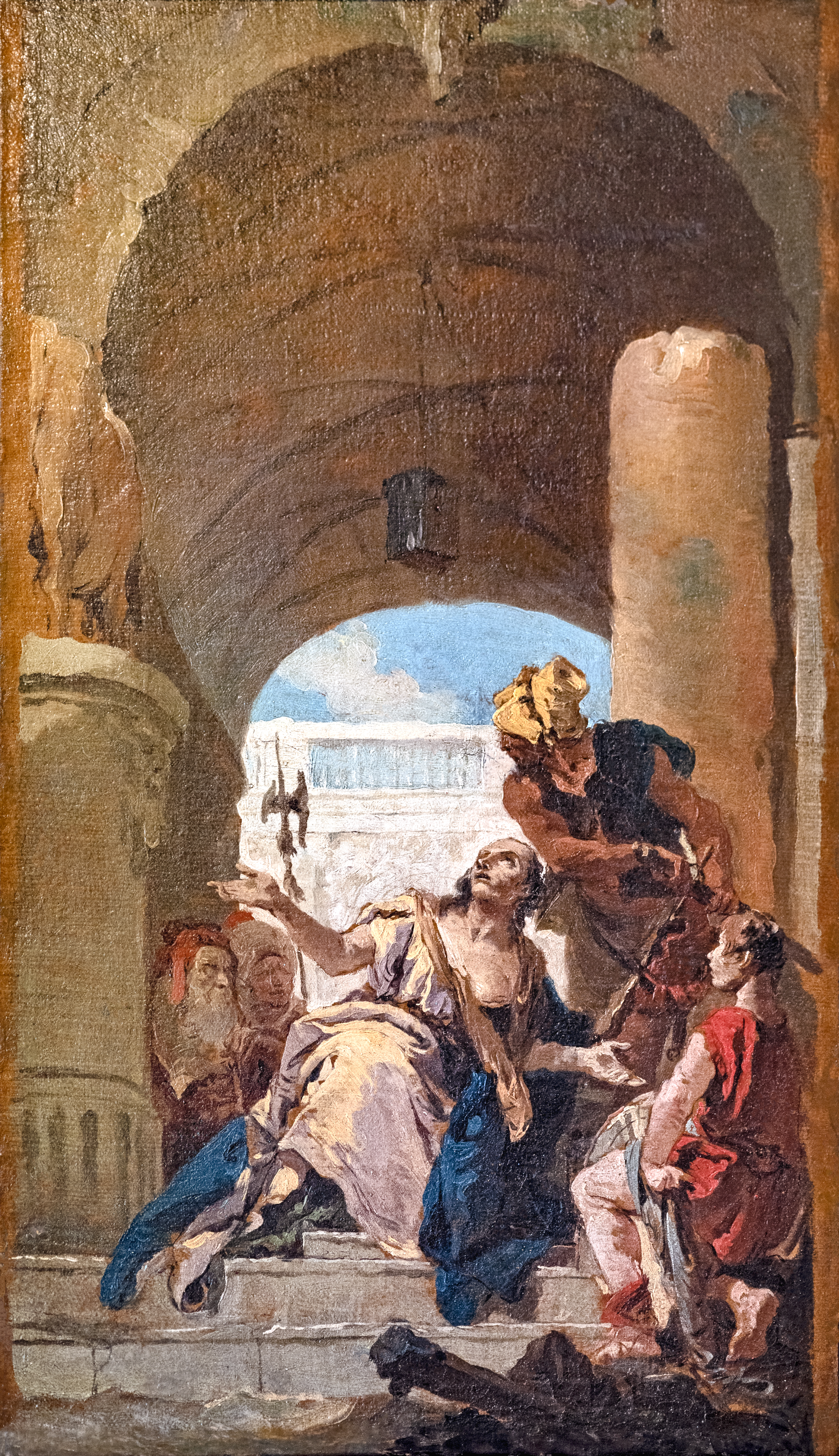
- Martyrdom of Saint Theodora of Rome by Giovanni Battista Tiepolo

Martyr
- Died: 120
- Venerated in: Roman Catholic Church; Eastern Orthodox Church
- Feast: 1 April (Catholic Church); 5 April (Orthodox Church)

Theodora was a Roman martyr. The little we know about her life is attributed to the Acta of Pope St. Alexander. She was the sister of St. Hermes, to whom she had given aid and care during his difficult time in prison. She was martyred some time after her brother, in 120. The siblings were later buried side by side on the Salarian road outside of Rome.
