= Medikion Monastery =

Greek Orthodox monastery near Tirilye, Turkey

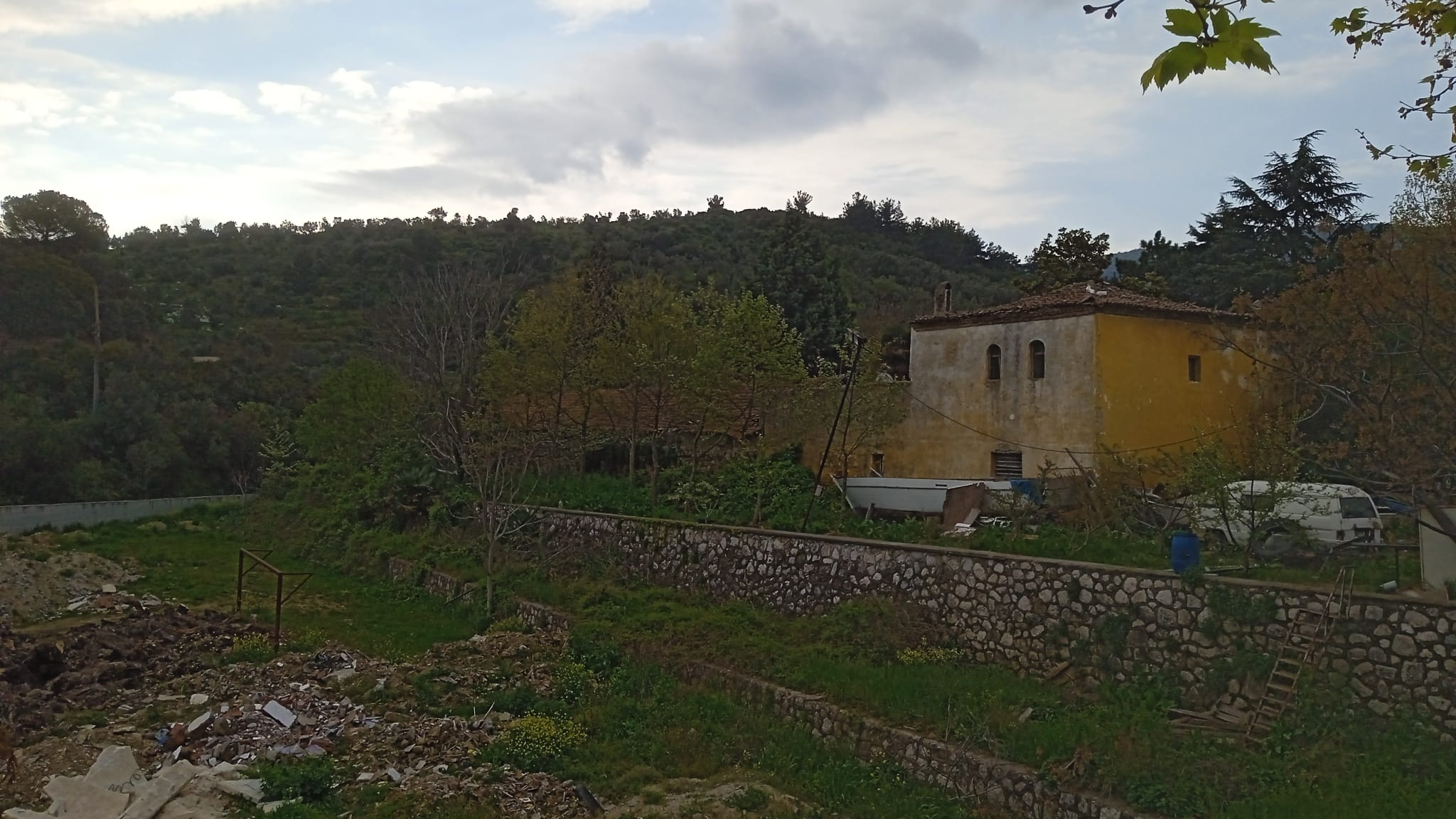
- State of the monastery as of 2023

- Location within Marmara Location within Turkey

Monastery information
- Other name: Agios Sergios monastery
- Established: 780

Site
- Location: Tirilye, Turkey
- Coordinates: 40.38532°N 28.79058°E

The Monastery of Saint Sergios of Medikion (Greek: Μονή Αγίου Σεργίου του Μηδικίου), commonly simply known as the Medikion Monastery (Μονή Μηδικίου; Turkish: Medikion manastırı), and later as the Monastery of the Holy Fathers (Greek: Μονή των Πατέρων) is a ruined Byzantine-era monastery near modern Tirilye in Turkey (medieval Trigleia in Bithynia). It is best known for the role its founders played in opposing Byzantine Iconoclasm. Built in 780, it was revered by the local Orthodox population until the Greco-Turkish population exchange in 1922.

The only remnants of the monastery complex is the perimeter wall (peribolos), which has a fortress-like appearance with its high walls and solid door. Above the entrance, there is a heavily damaged inscription on which only the date 1801 is legible. The historian Adolphe Hergès, in his Les monastères de Bithynie, indicates that the name Medikios may derive from the name for "cloverleaf" and that the church was referred to in more recent times by the people as "Pateron", that is, "Fathers".

Tryphon E. Evangelides and W.M. Ramsay dated the monastery's construction to 810, but Hergès preferred a date around 780. This is now the accepted date. The founder of the monastery was Nikephoros, who restored a ruined church dedicated to Saint Michael and built the monastery around it. Nikephotos served as its first abbot until his death and in 813. Nikephoros participated in the Second Council of Nicaea in 787, where he indicates the monastery full original name as "Saint Sergios of Medikion". After Nikephoros's death, his pupil Niketas became the abbot. Niketas was persecuted with the beginning of the second Iconoclasm under Leo V (r. 813–820). He died in 824, and is celebrated by the Orthodox Church as an iconodule Confessor of the Faith. Both Nikephoros and Niketas were buried at the narthex of the monastery's church of Saint Michael.

The history of the monastery is only intermittently known thereafter. The monastery was given as a grant to Michael Psellos in the mid-11th century, by which time it was known as the "Monastery of the Holy Fathers", indicating a cult around the two founding hegoumenoi. The monastery disappears from literary sources thereafter.

The monastery burned down in 1800, and was rebuilt in 1801, but was in a derelict condition during a visit by Frederick William Hasluck early in the 20th century. Hasluck described the katholikon as "magnificent", and wrote that it was ornamented with originally arched and black and white mosaics in the courtyard. Pancenko, who came here in 1910, drew the attention to the old icons and likened it to "a museum where Greek Church pictures are exhibited". Evangelides (1889) defined the church as a large rectangle and he added: "It has no roof and columns, it is almost like a large inn deserted by its owner...".

== Sources ==
- Nesbitt, John; Oikonomides, Nicolas, eds. (1996). Catalogue of Byzantine Seals at Dumbarton Oaks and in the Fogg Museum of Art, Volume 3: West, Northwest, and Central Asia Minor and the Orient. Vol. 3. Washington, DC: Dumbarton Oaks Research Library and Collection. ISBN 0-88402-250-1.
- Talbot, Alice-Mary (1991). "Medikion monastery". In Kazhdan, Alexander (ed.). The Oxford Dictionary of Byzantium. Oxford and New York: Oxford University Press. p. 1328. ISBN 0-19-504652-8.
