= Nicetas of Medikion =

Saint Niketas of Medikion
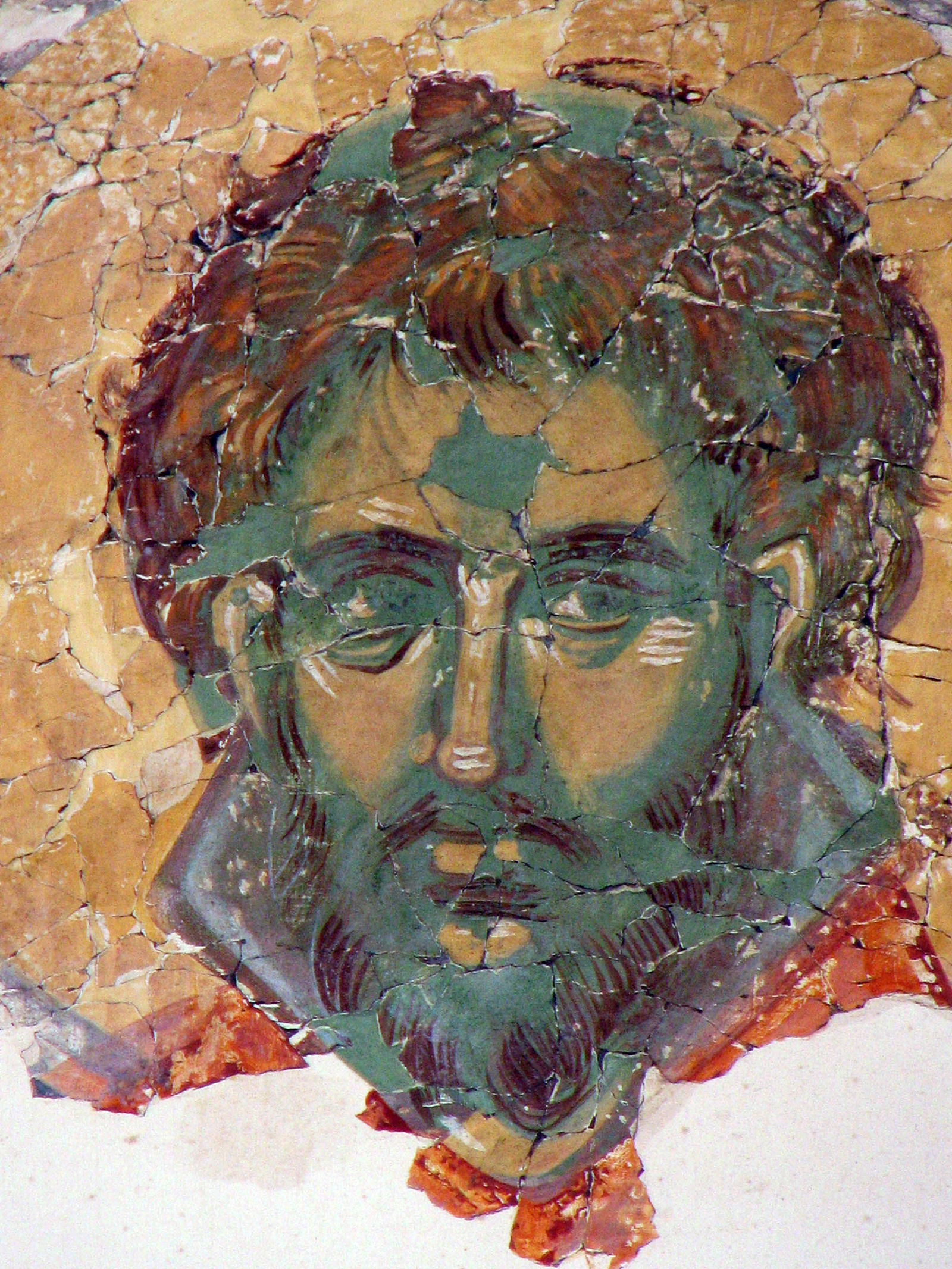
- Fresco in the Transfiguration Church in Kovalyovo, 1380.

Confessor, Wonderworker and Venerable Abbot
- Born: Bithynian Caesarea
- Died: 824; Constantinople, Byzantine Empire (modern-day Istanbul, Turkey)
- Venerated in: Eastern Orthodox Church
- Feast: April 3
- Controversy: Iconodulism

Saint Nicetas of Medikion (Greek: Νικήτας Μηδικίου) or Nicetas the Confessor (Νικήτας ο ομολογητής), who is commemorated on 3 April, was a monk who opposed Byzantine Iconoclasm.

== Life ==
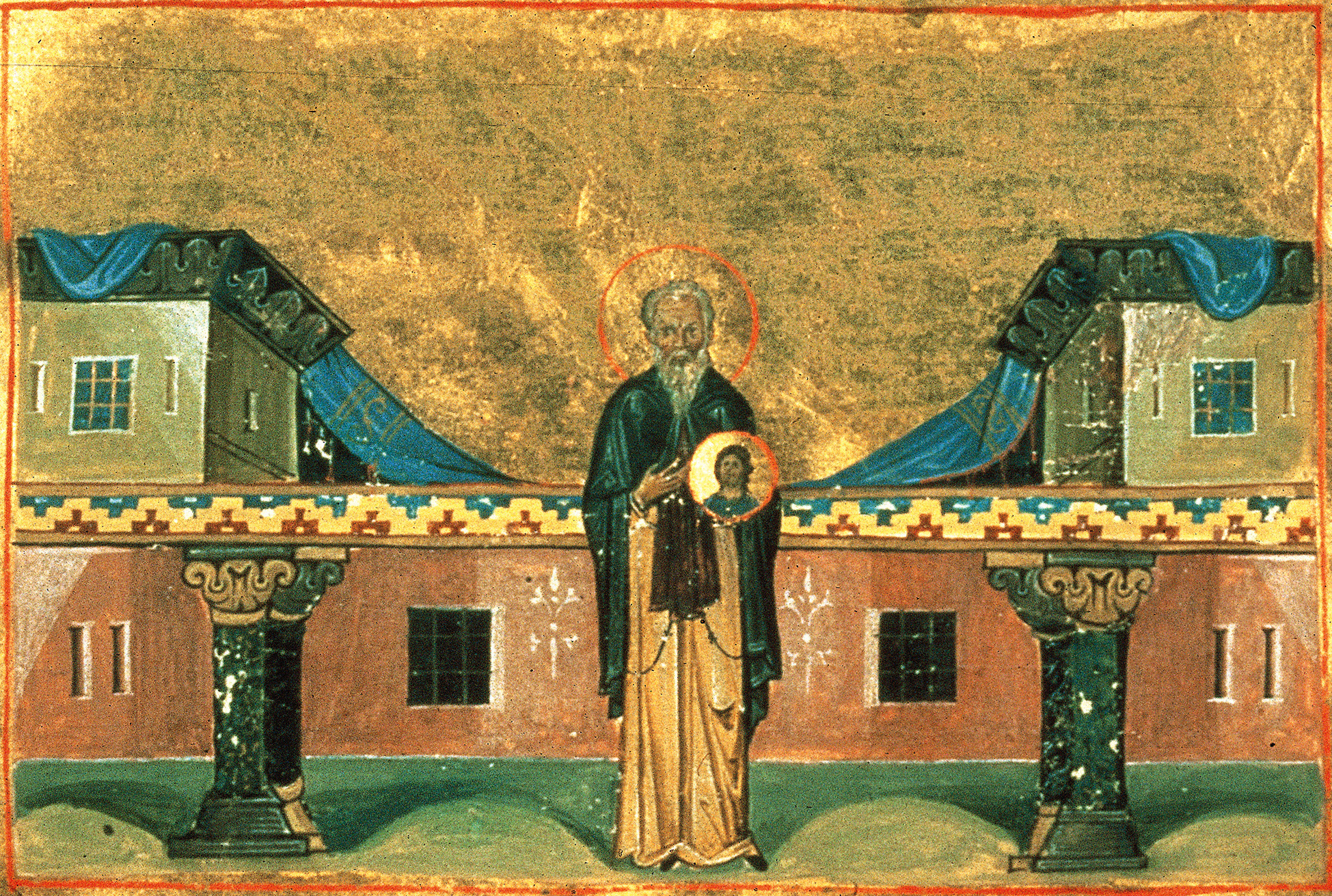
Miniature from the Menologion of Basil II

Nicetas was born in Bithynian Caesarea of a pious family. His mother died eight days after his birth, and his father Philaretos became a monk. The child was raised by his grandmother. From his youth Nicetas attended church and was a disciple of the hermit Stephen.

At a relatively young age Nicetas joined the Medikion Monastery (μονή Μηδικίου) where Nicephorus was the hegoumenos (similar to abbot). In 790, After seven years at the monastery, Nicetas was ordained presbyter. When Nicephorus became ill, he entrusted to Nicetas the guidance of the monastery, and when Nicephorus died, Nicetas was chosen hegoumenos by the monks. His piety drew many others to join and follow him at the monastery.

Twice he was imprisoned for taking stands against the heresy of iconoclasm. According to the Russian and Serbian “Synaxars”, his courageous opposition to the iconoclasts resulted in his exile, at the beginning of the 9th century, during the reign of Leo V the Armenian in Byzantium. Upon the death of the Emperor Leo, Nicetas was released, but rather than return to Medikion retreating to an austere life in a monastery near Constantinople, where he died in 824. His remains were brought back to the monastery of Medikion.

Several medieval lives of Nicetas exist. The most important of these is the life by Theosterictus, who states that he was a disciple of Nicetas.

In his Canon, written by the Constantinopolitan hieromonk, Saint Joseph the Hymnographer, the life led by Saint Nicetas was described as ascetic, God–pleasing, and full of charity. He is mentioned as a wonderworker, with the gift of healing.

References to St. Nicetas have been found in old manuscripts originating from the Greek Orthodox Patriarchate of Jerusalem, and in menaia from the Orthodox Patriarchates of Serbia and Russia. A church, first constructed in the 18th century, was dedicated to him on the Greek island of Lefkas.
