= Theodosia of Tyre =

Roman Christian martyr

Saint Theodosia of Tyre
- Martyr
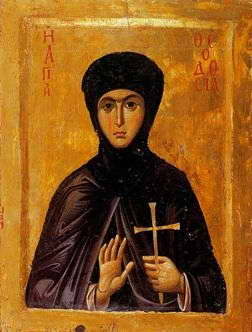
- Icon of St Theodosia, Virgin-martyr of Tyre

Personal details
- Born: 290 AD
- Died: 2 April, 307 Caesarea Maritima

Saint Theodosia of Tyre, according to the historian of the early Christian church Eusebius, was a seventeen-year-old girl who deliberately sought to be executed as a martyr to Christianity in the city of Caesarea in 307 AD. She was tortured, urged to reject Christianity, and, when she refused, thrown into the sea. She is commemorated on April 2.

== Background ==
There are two extant versions of Eusebius' Martyrs of Palestine, and in both the shorter and the longer versions, the story of Theodosia is recounted, though with variations. Eusebius was present in Caesarea during the persecutions, part of the empire-wide campaign to suppress Christianity. For five years, the governor Urbanus had sought to enforce the orders of the Emperors that all should perform sacrifices to the Roman gods, upon pain of death.

== Martyrdom ==
From Tyre, Lebanon, the seventeen-year-old Theodosia had made her way to Caesarea in Palestine. On Easter Day, 307, according to Eusebius, she went to the public square where a number of Christians were in chains awaiting interrogation. She congratulated them and asked to be remembered in their prayers. Seized by the guards and brought before the governor, he ordered her to sacrifice to the gods, and when she would not, he had her tortured with "cruel combs" on her side and breasts, and "she was torn on the ribs until her bowels were seen."

The governor, seeing that she endured these tortures uncomplainingly, appealed to her to perform sacrifices to the gods and be released, but, according to Eusebius, she replied that she had purposely come there and spoken to the Christians under guard in the square for the express purpose of being put to death by the authorities: "Why, oh man, dost thou deceive thyself, and not perceive that I have found the thing which I prayed to obtain at thy hands? For I rejoice greatly in having been deemed worthy to be admitted to the participation of the sufferings of God's martyrs: for indeed, for this very cause, I stood up and spake with them, in order that by some means or other they might make me a sharer in their sufferings." Whereupon she was thrown into the sea.

== After her death ==
Eusebius says that Urbanus had spent all his fury on the young girl and so the Christians she had spoken to who were under interrogation were sent as slaves to work in copper mines, without any torture being inflicted on them.

== See also ==
- 4th century in Lebanon
