= April 12 (Eastern Orthodox liturgics) =

Day in the Eastern Orthodox liturgical calendar

Eastern Orthodox liturgical calendar
April 11	April 12	April 13
April 12 O.S. ≍ April 25 N.S. April 12 N.S ≍ March 30 O.S.

An Eastern Orthodox cross

April 12 in Eastern Orthodox liturgical calendars is a feast day and a day of commemoration of saints and martyrs. Although some Orthodox churches use the Revised Julian Calendar and others use the traditional Julian calendar, the fixed commemorations for their respective April 12 are broadly the same, no matter which calendar is used. (Note: Despite the dates being the same, the days to which they refer typically differ by 13 days. The notation Old Style or O.S. is sometimes used to indicate a date in the traditional Julian Calendar (the "Old Calendar"). The notation New Style or N.S. indicates a date in the Revised Julian calendar (the "New Calendar").)

== Saints ==
- Hieromartyr Artemon the Presbyter, of Laodicea (284-305) (see also: March 24, April 13)
- Martyrs Demas and Protion, and those with them, by beheading (285-305)
- Martyr Sabbas the Goth, at Buzău in Wallachia (372) (Note: "In Cappadocia, in the reign of the emperor Valens, in the persecution raised against Christians by Athanaric, king of the Goths, St. Sabas, a Goth, who was cast into a river after undergoing cruel torments. According to St. Augustine, many other Christian Goths were at that time adorned with the crown of martyrdom.") (see also: April 15 - Slavic)
- Saint Isaac the Syrian (Isaac of Monteluco), Abbot of Spoleto, Italy (c. 550) (see also: April 11 - West)
- Venerable monk-martyrs David, John and Menas, of Palestine, shot by archers (after 636)
- Saint Basil the Confessor, Bishop of Parium (754)
- Venerable Anthusa of Constantinople (809) (Note: She was the daughter of Eudokia, third wife of Constantine V.) (Note: Name day: Anthi (Ἀνθή).)
- Venerable Athanasia the Wonderworker (Athanasia of Aegina), Abbess, of Aegina (860) (see also: April 18 - Greek)
- Saint Sergius II, Ecumenical Patriarch of Constantinople (1019)

== Pre-Schism Western saints ==
- Saint Vissia, a virgin-martyr in Fermo near Ancona in Italy under Decius (c. 250) (Note: John O'Hanlon has an entry for "St. Bascia, Virgin", on April 13th as follows: "According to the Martyrology of Donegal, the festival in honour of Bascia, a Virgin, was celebrated on this day. Her family, period and place do not seem to be known; nor can we trace her commemoration, in any of our earlier Calendars.")
- Saint Victor of Braga (São Victor), a catechumen martyred in Braga in Portugal under Diocletian, thus baptised in his own blood (c. 300) (Note: "At Braga, in Portugal, St. Victor, martyr, who although only a catechumen, refused to adore an idol, and confessed Jesus Christ with great constancy. After suffering many tortures, he was beheaded, and thus merited to be baptized in his own blood.")
- Saint Julius I, Pope of Rome, defended St Athanasius against his Arian accusers, and also built many churches (352)
- Hieromartyr Zeno of Verona, Bishop of Verona (371) (Note: Born in North Africa, he became Bishop of Verona in Italy at the time of Julian the Apostate. He was remembered as a fervent pastor and a fierce opponent of Arianism.)
- Saint Constantine, the first Bishop of Gap in France (529)
- Saint Wigbert (690) (Note: Born in England, he became a disciple of St Egbert in Ireland. He spent two years in Friesland in the Netherlands but later returned to Ireland.)
- Saint Tetricus, Abbot of St Germanus in Auxerre, then Bishop of Auxerre by popular acclamation, murdered in his sleep (707)
- Saint Damian of Pavia, Bishop of Pavia in Lombardy in Italy, who vigorously opposed Monothelitism (710)
- Saint Erkemboden, a monk at Sithin in Saint-Omer in France, later Bishop of Thérouanne (714)
- Saint Alferius, (Alpherius, Adalfericus), monk, founder of the Monastery of La Cava (1050) (Note: A Norman by origin, he was born in Salerno. Sent as an ambassador to France, there he fell ill and became a monk. The Duke of Salerno asked for his return and Alferius settled at Mt Fenestra near Salerno. There he founded the monastery of La Cava which became very influential in the south of Italy.)

== Post-Schism Orthodox saints ==
- Saint Basil of Ryazan, Bishop of Ryazan (1295) (see also: May 21, June 10, July 3, and July 10)
- Venerable Acacius of Kapsokalyvia Skete, Mount Athos (1730)
- Saint Filofteia Antonescu, Schemanun, from Pasărea Monastery, mother of St. Calinic of Cernica (1833) (Note: See: (in Romanian) Filofteia Antonescu. Wikipedia. (Romanian Wikipedia).)

=== New martyrs and confessors ===
- New Hieromartyr Demetrius Rozhdestvensky, Protopresbyter of Alma-Ata (1921)
- New Hieromartyr Sergiy Krestnikov (1938)

== Other commemorations ==
- Deposition of the Cincture (Sash) of the Most Holy Theotokos in Constantinople (942) (see also: August 31)
- Synaxis of the Murom Icon of the Most Holy Theotokos (early 12th century)
- Synaxis of the Belinich Icon of the Most Holy Theotokos (1876)
- Venerable Neophytus the Recluse, of Cyprus, Wonderworker (1204) (see also: January 24 - Feast day)
- Repose of Archbishop Juvenal of Vilnius, Lithuania, monk of Optina Monastery (1904)
- Proclamation of the autocephaly of the Church of Georgia (1917)

== Icon gallery ==
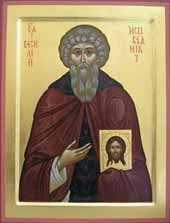
Icon of St. Basil the Confessor.

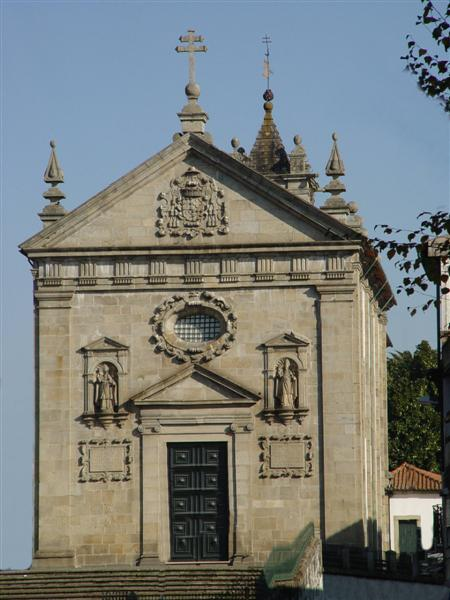
The Church of São Victor, in the municipality of Braga, Portugal.

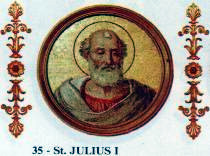
Saint Julius I, Pope of Rome.

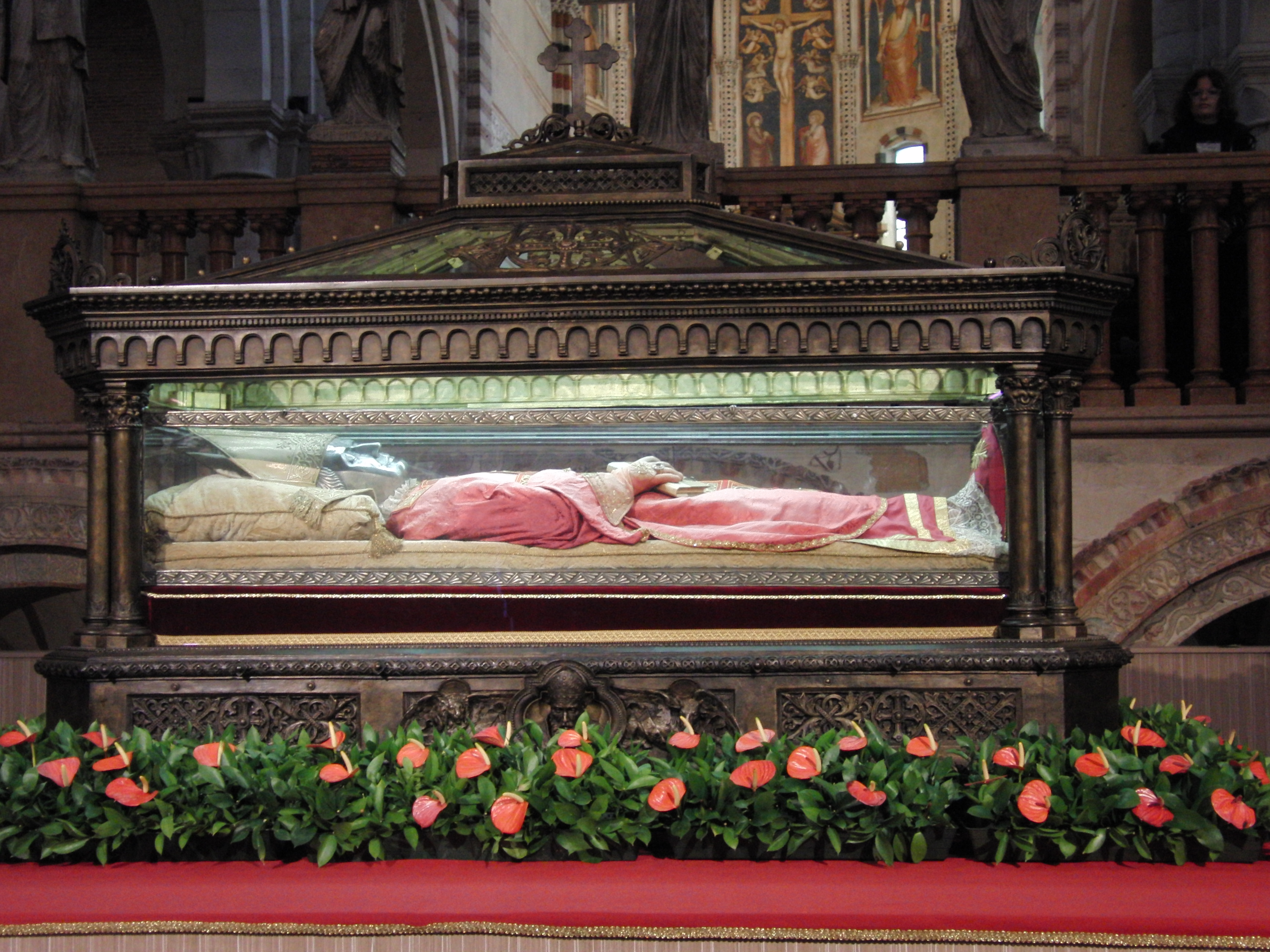
Relics of Hieromartyr Zeno of Verona, Bishop of Verona.

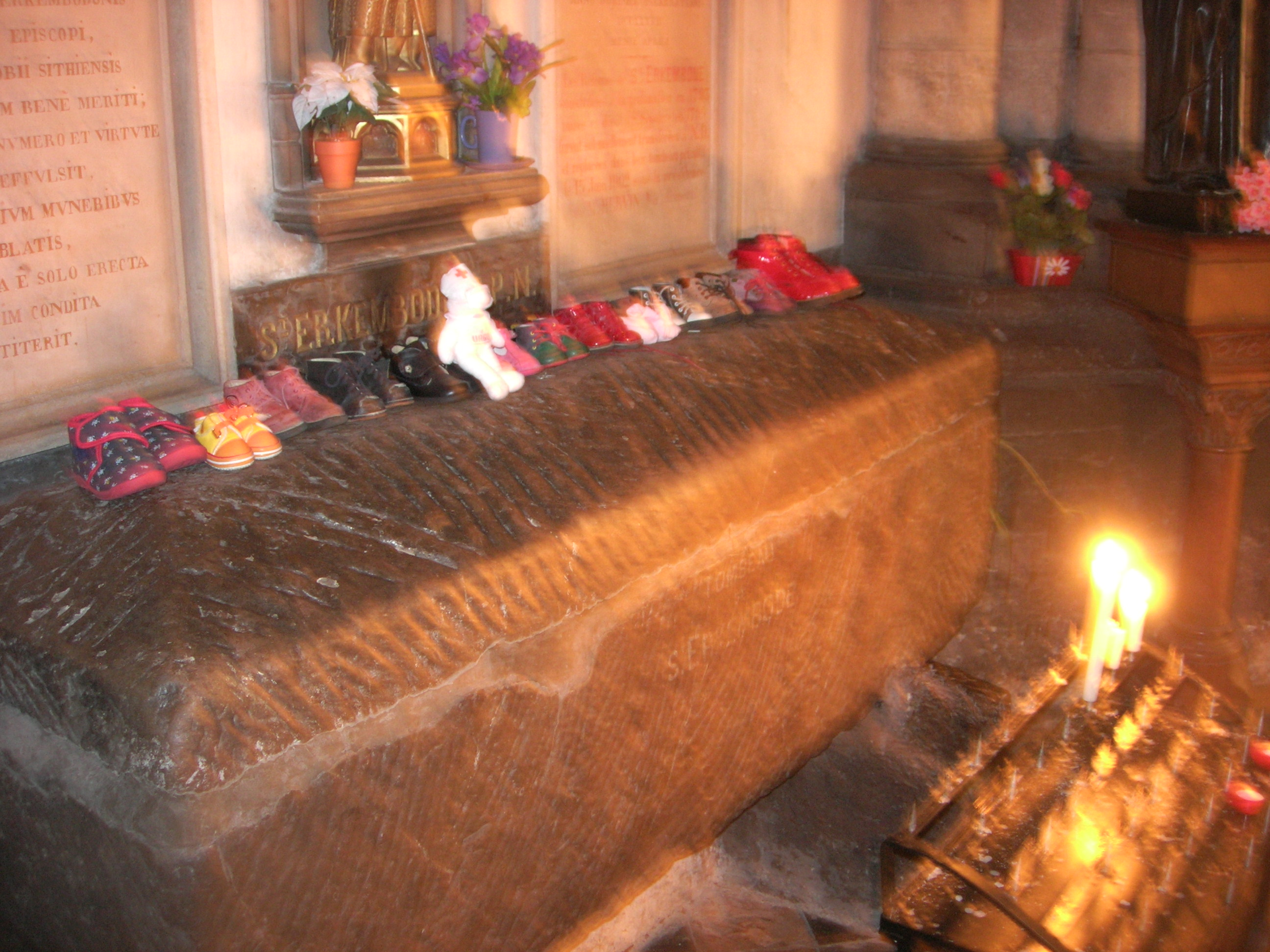
St Erkemboden's tomb in Saint-Omer Cathedral, with votive offerings placed on top.

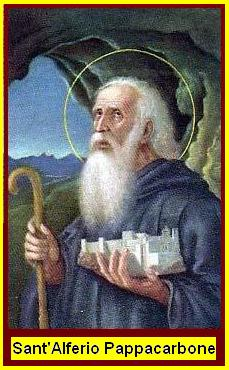
Saint Alferius, founder of the Monastery of La Cava.

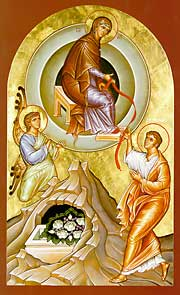
Icon depiction the Theotokos giving her cincture to Thomas the Apostle.

== Sources ==
- April 12 / April 25. Orthodox Calendar (pravoslavie.ru).
- April 25 / April 12. Holy Trinity Russian Orthodox Church (A parish of the Patriarchate of Moscow).
- April 12. OCA - The Lives of the Saints.
- The Autonomous Orthodox Metropolia of Western Europe and the Americas. St. Hilarion Calendar of Saints for the year of our Lord 2004. St. Hilarion Press (Austin, TX). p. 28.
- April 12. Latin Saints of the Orthodox Patriarchate of Rome.
- The Roman Martyrology. Transl. by the Archbishop of Baltimore. Last Edition, According to the Copy Printed at Rome in 1914. Revised Edition, with the Imprimatur of His Eminence Cardinal Gibbons. Baltimore: John Murphy Company, 1916. p. 103.
- Rev. Richard Stanton. A Menology of England and Wales, or, Brief Memorials of the Ancient British and English Saints Arranged According to the Calendar, Together with the Martyrs of the 16th and 17th Centuries. London: Burns & Oates, 1892. p. 155.

Greek Sources

- Great Synaxaristes: (in Greek) 12 Απριλιου. Μεγασ Συναξαριστησ.
- (in Greek) Συναξαριστής. 12 Απριλίου. ecclesia.gr. (H Εκκλησια Τησ Ελλαδοσ).

Russian Sources

- (in Russian) 25 апреля (12 апреля). Православная Энциклопедия под редакцией Патриарха Московского и всея Руси Кирилла (электронная версия). (Orthodox Encyclopedia - Pravenc.ru).
- (in Russian) 12 апреля (ст.ст.) 25 апреля 2013 (нов. ст.). Русская Православная Церковь Отдел внешних церковных связей.
