= April 11 (Eastern Orthodox liturgics) =

Day in the Eastern Orthodox liturgical calendar

Eastern Orthodox liturgical calendar
April 10	April 11	April 12
April 11 O.S. ≍ April 24 N.S. April 11 N.S ≍ March 29 O.S.

An Eastern Orthodox cross

April 11 in Eastern Orthodox liturgical calendars is a feast day and a day of commemoration of saints and martyrs. Although some Orthodox churches use the Revised Julian Calendar and others use the traditional Julian calendar, the fixed commemorations for their respective April 11 are broadly the same, no matter which calendar is used. (Note: Despite the dates being the same, the days to which they refer typically differ by 13 days. The notation Old Style or O.S. is sometimes used to indicate a date in the traditional Julian Calendar (the "Old Calendar"). The notation New Style or N.S. indicates a date in the Revised Julian calendar (the "New Calendar").)

== Saints ==
- Martyrs Processus and Martinian of Rome (c. 67)
- Hieromartyr Antipas of Pergamum, Bishop of Pergamon, disciple of St. John the Theologian (92) (Note: "At Pergamus, in Asia, St. Antipas, a faithful witness, of whom St. John speaks in the Apocalypse. Under the emperor Domitian, he was shut up in a red-hot brazen ox, and thus consummated his martyrdom.") (Note: (in Greek) "Ιερομάρτυρος Αντύπα (1), επισκόπου Περγάμου, του πρώτου χριστιανού και «πιστού μάρτυρος» εν Μικρά Ασία (†92).")
- Hieromartyr Domninus (Domnion), Bishop of Salona in Dalmatia, and eight soldiers with him (c. 100) (Note: One of the first to enlighten Dalmatia, where he was martyred as first Bishop of Salona, probably during the persecution of Diocletian.)
- Saint Philip of Gortyna, Bishop of Gortyna on Crete (180) (Note: "At Gortina, in Crete, in the time of Marcus Antoninus Verus and Lucius Aurelius Commodus, St. Philip, a bishop most renowned for merit and doctrine, who defended the church entrusted to his care against the fury of the Gentiles, and the wiles of the heretics.")
- Venerable Pharmuthius the Recluse, Anchorite of Egypt (4th century)
- Venerable-Martyr Bacchus, of the Great Lavra of St. Sabbas the Sanctified (8th century)
- Venerable John, disciple of Venerable Gregory of Decapolis (820)
- Venerable Tryfaini and Matrona of Cyzicus.

== Pre-Schism Western saints ==
- Saint Machai, a disciple of St Patrick who founded a monastery on the Isle of Bute in Scotland (5th century)
- Saint Isaac of Spoleto (Isaac of Monteluco), a Syrian monk who fled the Monophysite persecution and founded a monastery in Monteluco near Spoleto (c. 550) (Note: He was one of the restorers of ascetic life in 6th century Italy.)
- Saint Maedhog (Aedhan, Mogue), an abbot whose main monastery was Clonmore in Ireland (6th century)
- Saint Guthlac of Crowland, hermit of Crowland, England (714) (Note: From being a warrior in the army of Ethelred, King of Mercia, Guthlac became a monk at Repton in England. Afterwards he went to live as a hermit in the fens, where he spent the last fifteen years of his life like a desert-father. Later the monastery of Crowland grew up at the place where he had lived.) (see also: August 30)
- Saint Agericus (Aguy, Airy), Abbot of St Martin's in Tours (680)
- Saint Godebertha, a nun at Noyon and the first abbess of the convent founded there (c. 700)

== Post-Schism Orthodox saints ==
- Saint George, founder of the Monastery of Saint John Chrysostomos, north of Koutsovendis, in Cyprus (c. 1070)
- Venerable James, Abbot of Zhelezny Borok, Kostroma (1442), (Note: See: (in Russian) Иаков Железноборовский. Википедии. (Russian Wikipedia).) and his fellow ascetic St. James of Bryleevsk (15th century) (Note: "The Monk Jakov of Bryleevsk was a disciple of the Monk Jakov of Zheleznoborovsk (Comm. 11 April) and was a "trudnik" at his monastery (the word "trudnik" has two meanings: "truzhenik"-"toiler" and "posluzhnik"-"obedient"). He later founded the Bryleevsk wilderness-monastery in honour of the Entry into the Temple of the MostHoly Mother of God at a distance of 5 versts from the Zheleznoborovsk ForeRunner monastery, off in the direction of the city of Bua. The Monk Jakov died during the 15th century and was buried in the Entry into the Temple church. His memory is marked likewise on the Day of the Descent of the Holy Spirit upon the Apostles (i.e. Pentecost).")
- Venerable Euthymius (1456) and Chariton (1509), Abbots of Syanzhema, Vologda.
- Saint Barsanuphius, Bishop of Tver (1576) (Note: The translation of his relics took place on 20/6/1630.) (Note: See: (in Russian) Варсонофий II (епископ Тверской). Википедии. (Russian Wikipedia).)
- Saint Callinicus of Cernica (Kallinikos), Bishop of Rimnic in Romania (1868) (Note: He was the abbot of the Cernica Monastery near Bucharest, which became the center of printing and social activities in Wallachia. He was distinguished by humility and ascetic virtues. He was consecrated as bishop of Râmnic in 1850 and engaged in church-building and publishing, and opened a seminary. Shortly before his death he retired to the monastery he had founded.) (Note: "He was a devoted disciple of St Paisius Velichkovsky, and brought the spirituality and veneration of St Paisius to Romania.") (Note: See also: (in Romanian) Sfântul Calinic de la Cernica. Wikipedia. (Romanian Wikipedia).)

=== New martyrs and confessors ===
- New Martyrs Peter Zhukov and Prochorus Mikhailov, of Tver (1918)
- New Hieromartyr Nicholas Gavarin, Priest (1938)

== Other commemorations ==
- Commemoration of the Appearance of the Most Holy Theotokos at Pochaev, and the Leaving of her sacred Footprint there ("the Footprint") (1340)
- Repose of Elder Eulogius of St. George Kellion, Mt. Athos (1948)

== Icon gallery ==
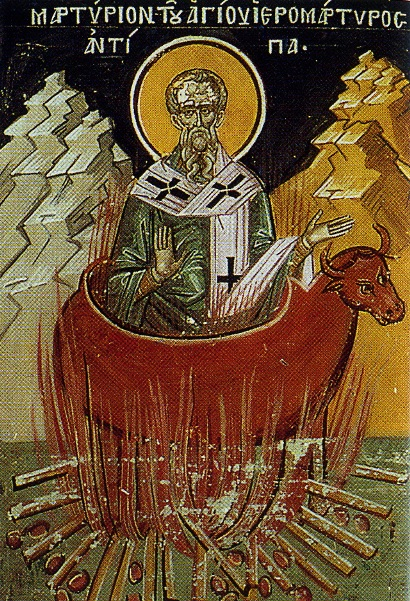
Martyrdom of St. Antipas of Pergamum.

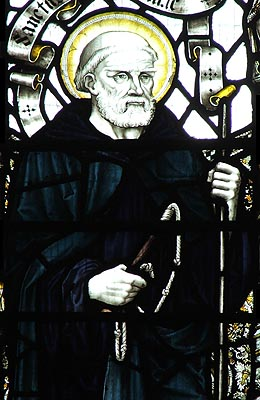
Stained glass panel depicting Guthlac of Crowland, in Crowland Abbey.

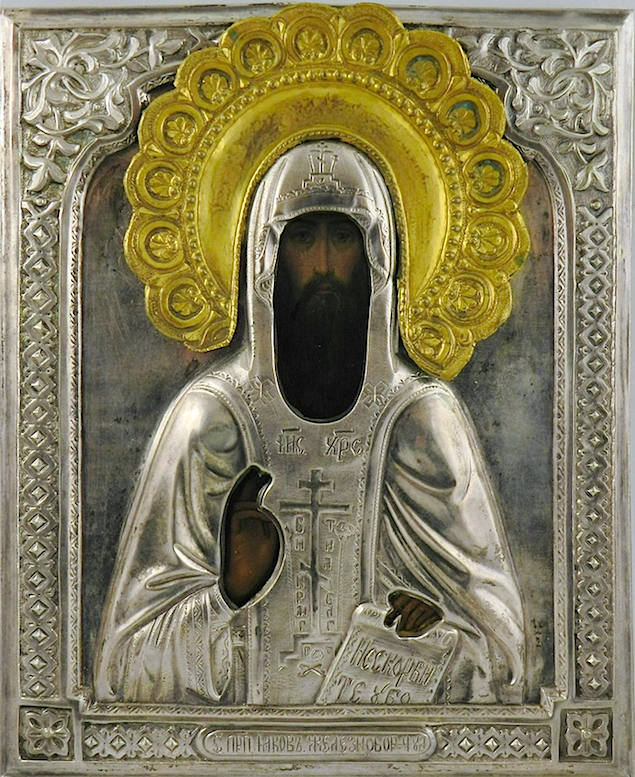
Venerable James, Abbot of Zhelezny Borok, Kostroma

== Sources ==
- April 11 / April 24. Orthodox Calendar (pravoslavie.ru).
- April 24 / April 11. Holy Trinity Russian Orthodox Church (A parish of the Patriarchate of Moscow).
- April 11. OCA - The Lives of the Saints.
- The Autonomous Orthodox Metropolia of Western Europe and the Americas. St. Hilarion Calendar of Saints for the year of our Lord 2004. St. Hilarion Press (Austin, TX). p. 28.
- April 11. Latin Saints of the Orthodox Patriarchate of Rome.
- The Roman Martyrology. Transl. by the Archbishop of Baltimore. Last Edition, According to the Copy Printed at Rome in 1914. Revised Edition, with the Imprimatur of His Eminence Cardinal Gibbons. Baltimore: John Murphy Company, 1916. p. 102.
- Rev. Richard Stanton. A Menology of England and Wales, or, Brief Memorials of the Ancient British and English Saints Arranged According to the Calendar, Together with the Martyrs of the 16th and 17th Centuries. London: Burns & Oates, 1892. pp. 152–154.

Greek Sources

- Great Synaxaristes: (in Greek) 11 Απριλιου. Μεγασ Συναξαριστησ.
- (in Greek) Συναξαριστής. 11 Απριλίου. ecclesia.gr. (H Εκκλησια Τησ Ελλαδοσ).

Russian Sources

- (in Russian) 24 апреля (11 апреля). Православная Энциклопедия под редакцией Патриарха Московского и всея Руси Кирилла (электронная версия). (Orthodox Encyclopedia - Pravenc.ru).
- (in Russian) 11 апреля (ст.ст.) 24 апреля 2013 (нов. ст.). Русская Православная Церковь Отдел внешних церковных связей.
