= José of Braganza =

José of Braganza may refer to:

- José, Prince of Brazil, Duke of Braganza (1761 – 1788)
- José of Braganza, Archbishop of Braga (1703 – 1756)
- José of Braganza, High Inquisitor of Portugal (1720 – 1801)
