= April 13 (Eastern Orthodox liturgics) =

Day in the Eastern Orthodox liturgical calendar

Eastern Orthodox liturgical calendar
April 12	April 13	April 14
April 13 O.S. ≍ April 26 N.S. April 13 N.S ≍ March 31 O.S.

An Eastern Orthodox cross

April 13 in Eastern Orthodox liturgical calendars is a feast day and a day of commemoration of saints and martyrs. Although some Orthodox churches use the Revised Julian Calendar and others use the traditional Julian calendar, the fixed commemorations for their respective April 13 are broadly the same, no matter which calendar is used. (Note: Despite the dates being the same, the days to which they refer typically differ by 13 days. The notation Old Style or O.S. is sometimes used to indicate a date in the traditional Julian Calendar (the "Old Calendar"). The notation New Style or N.S. indicates a date in the Revised Julian calendar (the "New Calendar").)

== Saints ==
- Saints Theodosia the Princess (daughter of Emperor Hadrian), and the Eunuch Gerontios (c. 117-138) (Note: Their memory is not recorded in the Synaxaristes. We know about the saints from the Lavriotiko Codex I 70, where they are both referenced.)
- Martyrs Dadas, Quinctillian and Maximus, the Lectors (c. 284-305) (Note: "The same day, the martyrdom of the Saints Maximus, Quinctillian, and Dadas, during the persecution of Diocletian.". See also August 2 for the Translation of their Relics.) (see also: April 28, August 2)
- Martyr Crescens of Myra in Lycia (3rd century) (see also: April 15 - Greek)
- Hieromartyr Artemon, priest of Laodicea in Syria (303) (see also: March 24, April 12 - Greek)
- Martyrs Eleutherius of Persia, and Zoilus, by beheading (4th century)
- Martyr Theodosius, by the sword.
- Martyr Thomais of Alexandria (476) (see also: April 14 - Greek)
- Saint Martyrius, Patriarch of Jerusalem (486)
- Saint Martin the Confessor, Pope of Rome (655) (Note: Born in Umbria, he was elected Pope of Rome in 649. He called a Council at once and condemned Monothelitism. Imperial wrath fell on him and in 653 he was deported to Naxos in the Aegean. The following year he was condemned to death at a mock trial and finally taken as a prisoner to the Chersonese where he died of starvation.) (see also: April 14 - Slavic)
- Two Confessor Bishops, who were exiled to the Crimean peninsula together with St. Martin the Confessor, Pope of Rome (ca. 655) (compare also with: Bishops Sergiy, Pir and Theodor, April 14 - Romanian)
- Venerable martyr Christophoros, of the Great Lavra of St. Sabbas the Sanctified.

== Pre-Schism Western saints ==
- Saint Ursus, Bishop of Ravenna and Confessor (396) (Note: Born in a noble family in Sicily, he converted and fled from his father's wrath to Ravenna in Italy, where he became bishop in 378. He built the original basilica to the Resurrection of Our Lord (called Anastasis in the Byzantine period))
- Saint Martius, Abbot, of Clermont in Gaul (c. 530) (Note: Born in Auvergne in France, he lived an ascetic life on a mountainside and later built a monastery for his disciples.)
- Saint Hermenegild, son of the Visigothic King of Spain, Leovigild (586) (Note: Son of the Visigothic King of Spain, Leovigild, he was brought up as an Arian in Seville. He became Orthodox on his marriage to the daughter of Sigebert of Austrasia, at which his father disinherited him. Hermenegild rose up in arms, was defeated, captured and refusing to give up his Faith, was martyred at the instigation of his stepmother.) (Note: "At Seville, in Spain, St. Hermenegild, son of Leovigild, Arian king of the Visigoths, who was incarcerated for the confession of the Catholic faith. By order of his wicked father he was beheaded because he had refused to receive communion from an Arian bishop, on the Paschal solemnity, and thus exchanging an earthly for a heavenly kingdom, he entered the abode of the blessed, both as a king and as a martyr.")
- Saint Guinoch of Buchan (Guinoc, Guinochus), a Bishop in Scotland (ca. 838)

== Post-Schism Orthodox saints ==
- Saint Arsenios of Elassonna (Arsenius of Suzdal), Archbishop of Elassona (1625) (Note: See: (in Russian) Арсений Элассонский. Википедии. Russian Wikipedia.) (see also: April 29)
- Venerable Herman, Archimandrite, of Svyatogorsk Monastery (1890) (Note: See: (in Russian) Герман (Клица). Википедии. Russian Wikipedia.)
- Saint Anastasia (Duchess Alexandra Petrovna of Oldenburg), nun and foundress of the Holy Protection Convent (Pokrovsky) in Kiev (1900) (Note: See: (in Russian) Покровский монастырь (Киев). Википедии. Russian Wikipedia.)

=== New martyrs and confessors ===
- New Hieromartyr Stephen (Bekh), Bishop of Izhevsk (1933) (Note: See: (in Russian) Стефан (Бех). Википедии. Russian Wikipedia.)
- Virgin-martyr Martha Testova (1941)

== Other commemorations ==
- Repose of Archimandrite Herman of Svyatogorsk (1890)
- Translation of the relics (1967) of the Holy New Martyr George of Cyprus (1752) (Note: His feast day is on April 23.)
- Repose of Elder Cosmas of Pantokratoros monastery, Mt. Athos (1970)

== Icon gallery ==
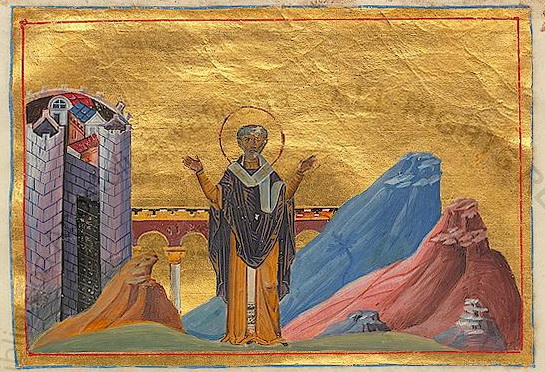
Saint Martin the Confessor (Menologion of Basil II)

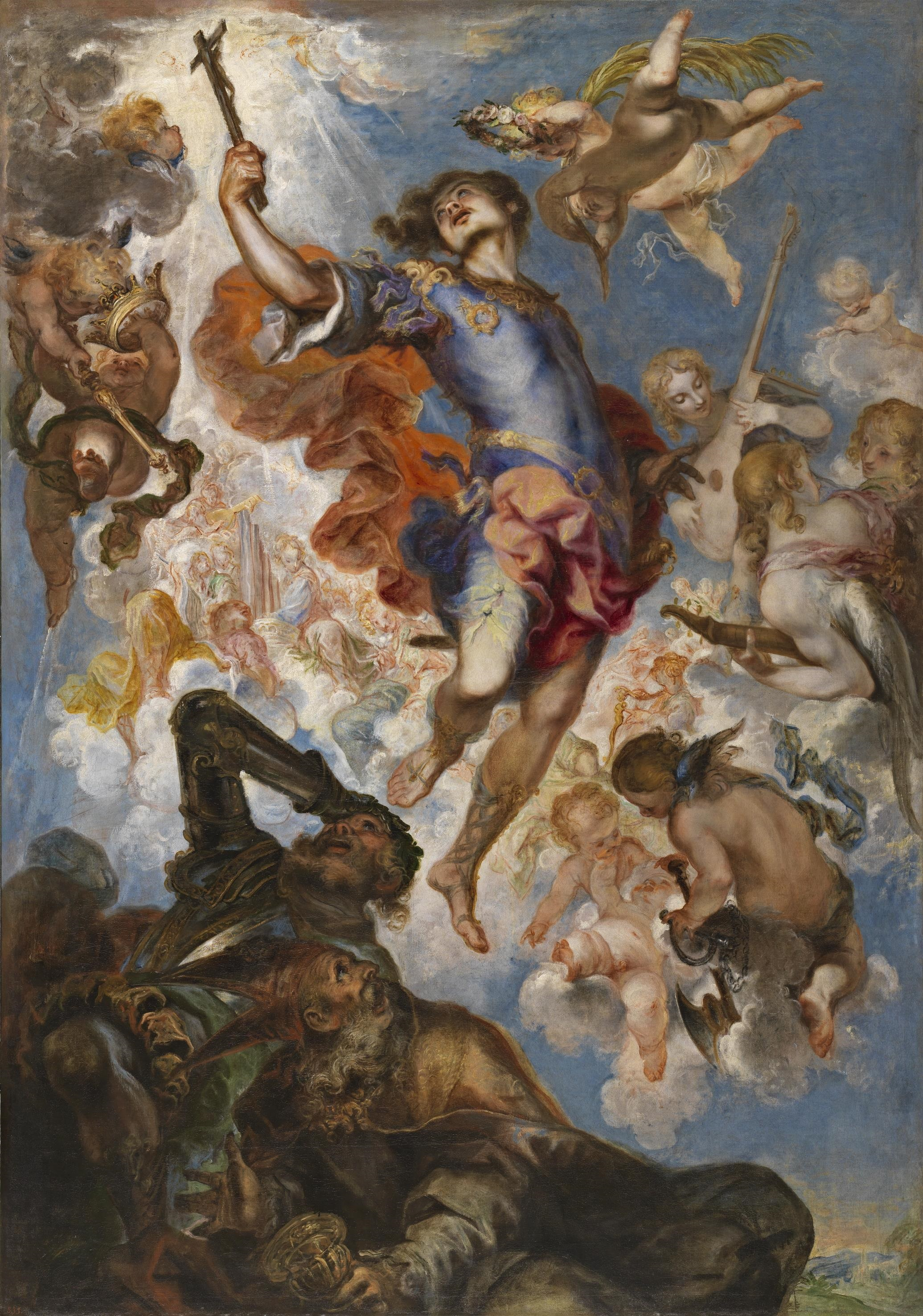
Saint Hermenegild (Francisco Herrera, 1684)

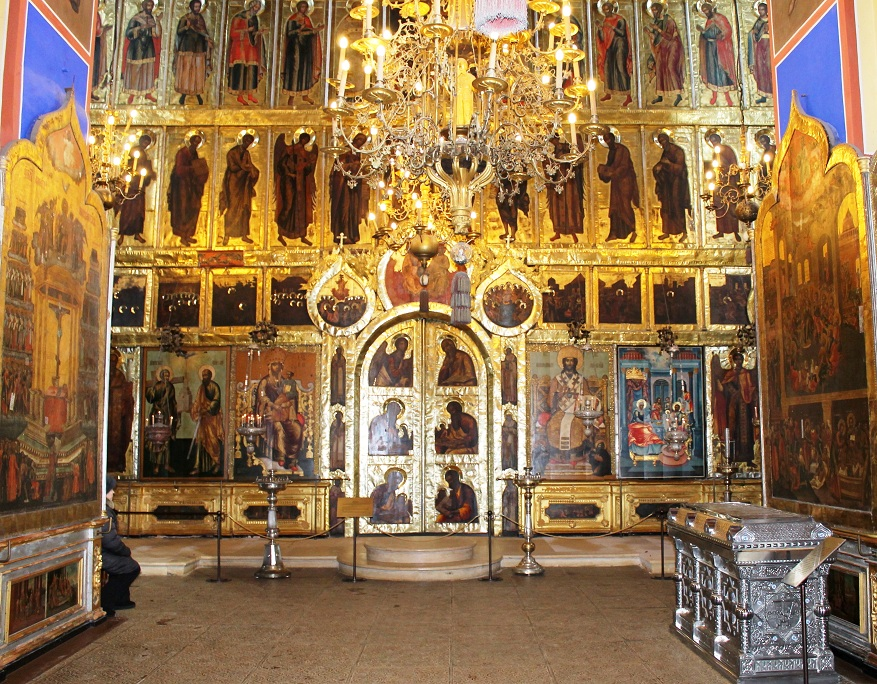
Reliquary of St. Arsenios of Elassonna, in the Theotokos-Nativity Cathedral of the Kremlin.

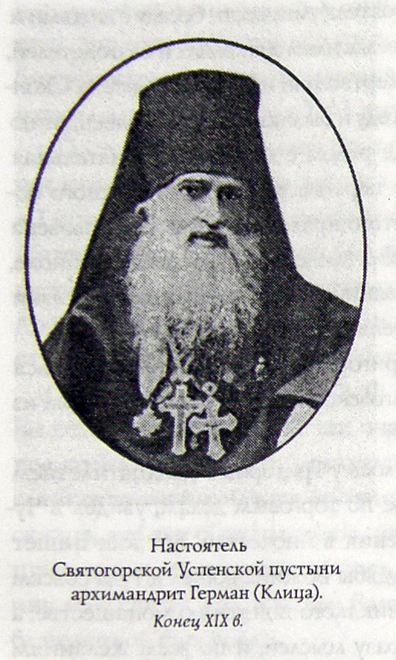
Venerable Herman, Archimandrite, of Svyatogorsk Monastery.

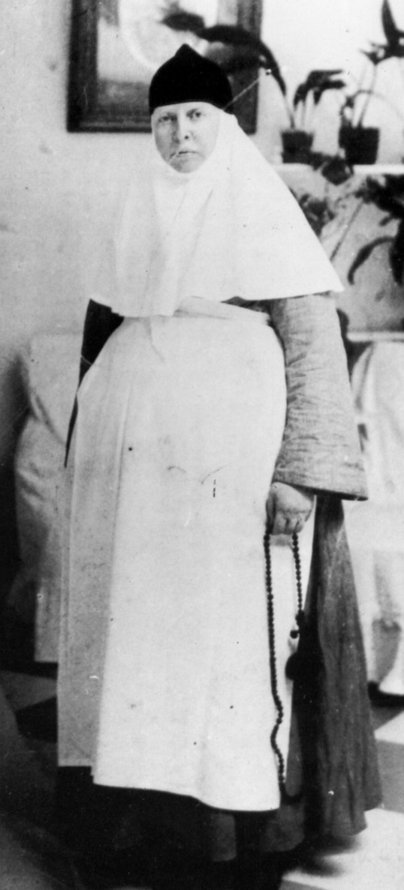
Sister Anastasia, formerly Grand Duchess Alexandra Petrovna

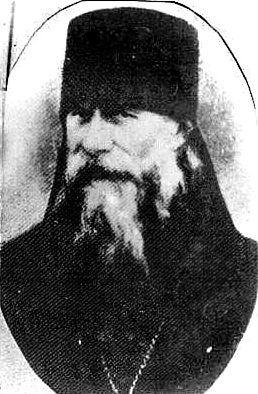
New Hieromartyr Stephen (Bekh), Bishop of Izhevsk.

== Sources ==
- April 13 / April 26. Orthodox Calendar (pravoslavie.ru).
- April 26 / April 13. Holy Trinity Russian Orthodox Church (A parish of the Patriarchate of Moscow).
- April 13. OCA - The Lives of the Saints.
- The Autonomous Orthodox Metropolia of Western Europe and the Americas. St. Hilarion Calendar of Saints for the year of our Lord 2004. St. Hilarion Press (Austin, TX). p. 28.
- April 13. Latin Saints of the Orthodox Patriarchate of Rome.
- The Roman Martyrology. Transl. by the Archbishop of Baltimore. Last Edition, According to the Copy Printed at Rome in 1914. Revised Edition, with the Imprimatur of His Eminence Cardinal Gibbons. Baltimore: John Murphy Company, 1916. pp. 104–105.

Greek Sources

- Great Synaxaristes: (in Greek) 13 Απριλιου. Μεγασ Συναξαριστησ.
- (in Greek) Συναξαριστής. 13 Απριλίου. ecclesia.gr. (H Εκκλησια Τησ Ελλαδοσ).

Russian Sources

- (in Russian) 26 апреля (13 апреля). Православная Энциклопедия под редакцией Патриарха Московского и всея Руси Кирилла (электронная версия). (Orthodox Encyclopedia - Pravenc.ru).
- (in Russian) 13 апреля (ст.ст.) 26 апреля 2013 (нов. ст.). Русская Православная Церковь Отдел внешних церковных связей.
