= São Victor =

- Civil parish
- Location in Portugal
- Coordinates: 41.555°N 8.410°W
- Country: Portugal
- Region: Norte
- Intermunic. comm.: Cávado
- District: Braga
- Municipality: Braga

Area
  - Total: 4.08 km^{2} (1.58 sq mi)

Population (2011)
  - Total: 29,642
  - Density: 7,270/km^{2} (18,800/sq mi)
- Time zone: UTC+00:00 (WET)
  - Summer (DST): UTC+01:00 (WEST)
- Website: http://juntasvictor.pt/

São Victor (also São Vítor) is a Portuguese parish, located in the municipality of Braga. The population in 2011 was 29,642, in an area of 4.08 km^{2}.

It is named after Saint Victor of Braga, an early Christian martyr who was put to death around AD 300.

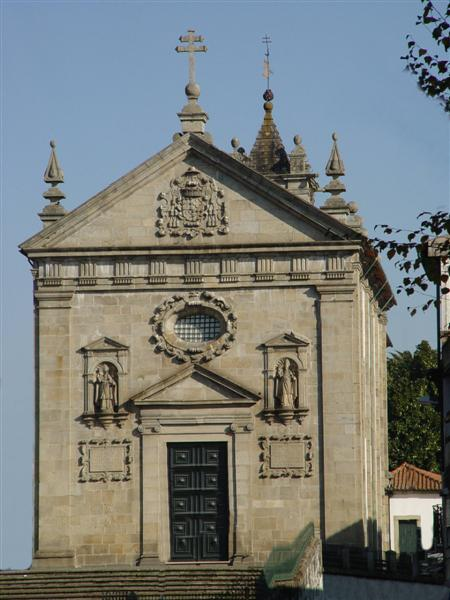
São Victor Church

== Main sights ==
- Sete Fontes
