= Sete Fontes (Braga) =

- Complexo das Sete Fontes
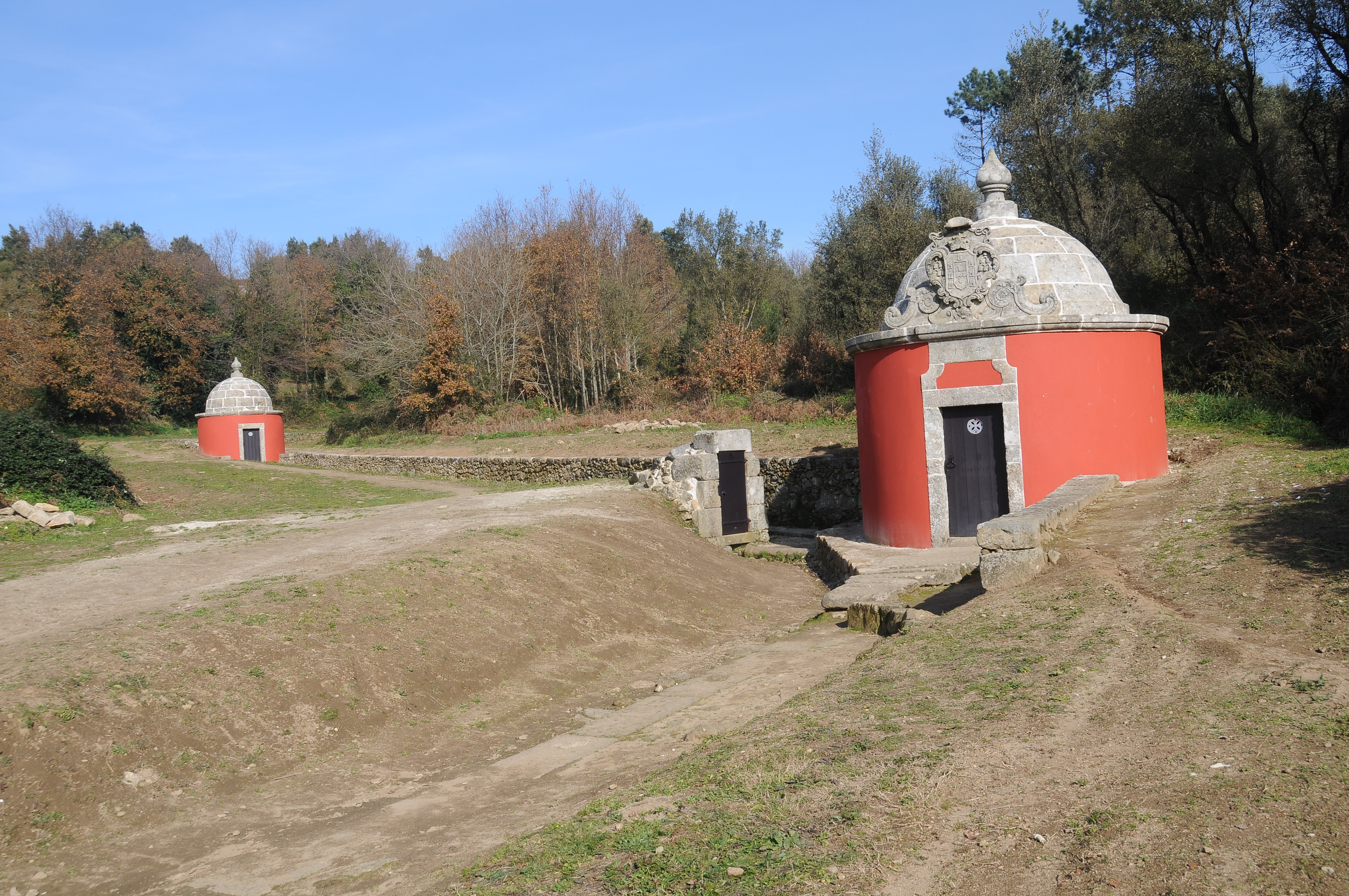
- Some of the access houses within the civil parish of São Vitor
- Interactive map of the Sete Fontes area

General information
- Type: Water supply
- Architectural style: Baroque
- Location: S. Victor , Braga, Portugal
- Coordinates: 41°34′10.16″N 8°24′13.90″W
- Opened: 1st century
- Owner: Portuguese Republic

Technical details
- Material: Granite

The Sete Fontes (literally 'Seven Springs') is part of a large water supply system built in mid-18th century, that supplied potable water to the northern Portuguese municipality of Braga, until the first half of the 20th century. In reality, there are only six springs from this network that still exist, following destruction of one in the early 1990s, to allow the construction of residential homes. The remaining sections of the Sete Fontes are identifiable for the springs that are housed within their respective Mãe de aguas ('mother of waters'), which are connected via aqueducts running along the surface or through tunnels, known as minas ('mines').

== History ==
The system is located on the outskirts of the civil parish of São Victor close to the ancient Roman Geira (also known as Route XVIII). There is speculation that these springs may date to the Roman occupation, when Braga was then known as Bracara Augusta.

For Braga, the necessity to support its population, came from its archbishops, which were preoccupied with these issued at least until the 16th century. Until the beginning of that century, D. Diogo de Sousa had brought water from Fonte dos Granginhos, in 1531 until Fonte de Santiago and Fonte da Pracinha, while (at the same time) constructing the fountain of Carcova, building a fountain in the Largo do Paço.

The main sections of the system were constructed between 1744 and 1752, under the patronage of Archbishop D. José de Bragança (1741–1756), although it is known that his predecessor D. Rodrigo de Moura Telles (1704–1728) already completed portions of the network: first deposit dates to 1752. D. José became interested in this issue immediately after arrive in Braga, starting in August 1741, and continuing at a steady rhythm until 1744. For his part, D. Rodrigo de Moura Telles supplied water to the Hospital of São Marcos and substituted this fountain with another (the Fountain of Castelos).

Friar D. Caetano Brandão (1790–1805) ordered the opening of the Mina dos orphaons ('Mine of the Orphans') around 1804 to supply water to the institution which he founded.

By 1914, the network continued to function. Until the beginning of water treatment and supply from the Cávado River in 1914, the Sete Fontes was the main source of water for the city. It continued to be used until 1929, even as water continues to flow through the system. Still today water is running through the system.

Although the Sete Fontes was mentioned within the city plans of Braga as late as 1994, as an important resource, beginning in the mid-1990s several developments put in cause the protection of the historical system. The Mina de Adelino Correia was destroyed in 1995, with rumour developing that the stones were stored somewhere in Braga. On 18 April 1995, a dispatch was authorized for the system's evaluation for consideration as a national monument.

=== Preservation ===
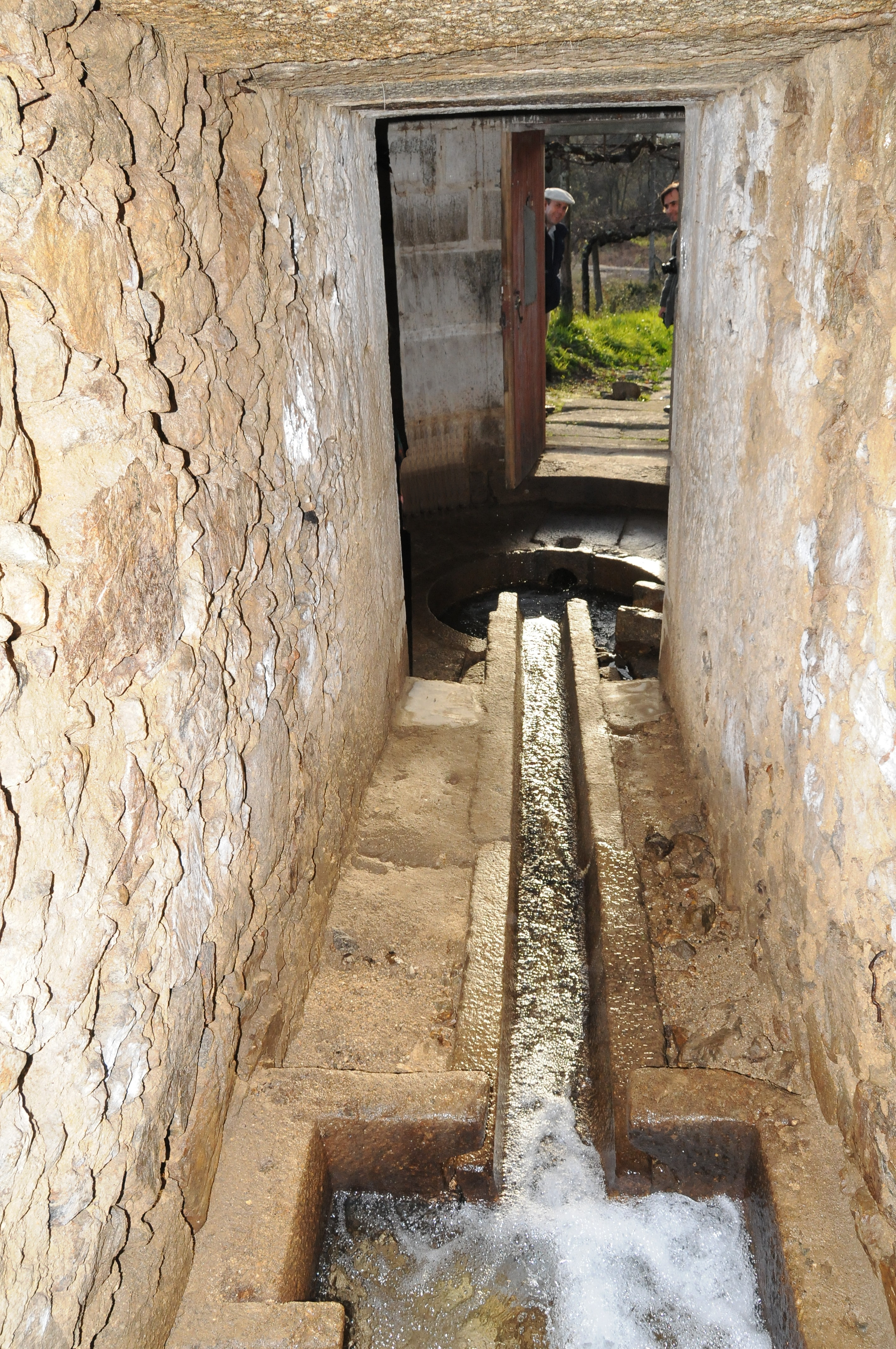
An interior perspective of the water junction in the Mina of Dr. Sampaio

The 1999 city plan indicated that the upper portion of the Sete Fontes was to be destroyed in order to provide space for the construction of an extension to the national road network. During public consultations in 2003, regarding this planned 4-lane roadway, engineers indicated the need to destroy half of the Sete Fontes in order to build the expansion. The initial Environmental impact assessment (EIA) noted that at least five of the aqueducts and many minas would be affected by this construction project, but researchers at the Instituto Português do Património Arquitectónico (IPPAR), stated the project could be completed, if proper monitoring was accomplished, noting that the aqueducts should be restored after the construction was completed.

The area occupied by the Sete Fontes is located in an area designated for urban expansion within the municipal plan. Many of the parcels were purchased by real estate companies and/or developers, without submitting plans for the system's preservation and rehabilitation. Although, the municipal authorities had indicated their desire to preserve the Sete Fontes as a National monument and transform the area into a municipal park, the area continued to be identified for construction and road redevelopment, in the municipal plan. In the 1999-2000 municipal plan, three of the upper minas fell within an area classified as "public utility" and were zoned for the construction of a hospital in 2002. Yet, these lands were also classified for use by the Portuguese armed forces.

On one occasion, the municipal government had attempted to impede the re-classification process for the system. Concerning nationally sensitive heritage sites, Portuguese law states that the authorized patrimonial agency (IPPAR, IGESPAR or DRCNorte) has to give explicit approval for projects within 50 metres (160 ft) of a designated structure, or group of structures. There have been no approvals under its classification file.

In 2009, in order to remedy the planned construction, Estradas de Portugal suggested the construction of a bridge over Sete Fontes.

In 2008, a large section of the lands, 57,950 square metres (623,800 ft^{2}), were put on sale: these included the parcels that covered the Minas das Verdosas 1, Minas das Verdosas 2, Mina dos Orfãos, Mina do Respiro (near Mina das Freiras), and half Mina das Freiras, that also included various aqueducts and underground galleries.

The president of the local Junta Freguesia of São Vitor thinks attempted to obtain clarification as to the status of the Sete Fontes, and the sale of these lands. Approaching the municipal authorities, on several occasions, the president had not received any answers. Yet, the director of the Direção Regional de Cultura do Norte (DRCNorte) also confirmed that there were promises to build on lands of the Sete Fontes. Inadvertently, this was also supported by claims on building densities for the area of Sete Fontes, where the municipal authority indicated that proposed densities were 25% less than first expected, in the detailed plan for Sete Fontes. Opposition politicians within the municipal council suggested that landowners within the Sete Fontes should trade their lands for others in the region, a process that was successfully implemented with the construction of the municipal stadium. By trading lands with local developers, it was assumed that the city could ensure a 20 hectare green space (that included the Sete Fontes), and a park of 56 hectares.

At the time of the construction of the local hospital, the site-plan for the building partially covered the Sete Fontes complex. When contacted, the Instituto de Gestão do Património Arquitectónico e Arqueológico (IGESPAR), the patrimonial agency responsible for the site, claimed that they were unaware of the situation: the construction company had ignored the presence of Sete Fontes. During the construction, representatives of the construction company expelled at least one of the archaeologists, that by law were required to accompany the progress of the construction. This followed the drainage of loose soil downstream by rainwater, into the area of the Sete Fontes, that impaired the structural integrity of at least one of the underground galleries, altered the landscape and created ditches, affecting the Mina dos Orfãos. During the building process, Roman ruins were discovered within the area.

At least one ventilation shaft for the underground gallery leading water to Mina dos Orfão was disturbed. At the end of 2008, the builders erected a fence just within the 50 metres (160 ft) minimum demarcation zone required by Portuguese law. The Mina das Verdosas 2, and its underground gallery, were demolished in February 2011 because of a new road. The authorities (DRCNorte, Estradas de Portugal and the cabinet chief of the Secretary of State for Culture) claimed that both Mina das Verdosas 1 and 2 were never part of Sete Fontes (but in reality were never included in the IPPAR/IGESPAR classification process). In addition, both Estradas de Portugal and Braga Municipal Council claimed that the access road to the hospital would not affect Sete Fontes. By early 2011, the city's geographical information system platform continued to classify most of the terrains as suitable for construction (except for those included within the hospital's construction zone).

=== Monument ===
Since most of the remaining sections of the complex are on private land the process of conserving and promoting the group has been difficult. The non-governmental organization Associação para a Defesa, Estudo e Divulgação do Património Cultural e Natural ('Association for the Defence, Study and Promotion of the Natural and Cultural Patrimony') had, for a long period of time, been promoting the Sete Fontes as a National monument. The organization petitioned the IPPAR on 27 March 1995 to classify the Sete Fontes as a national monument, in dispatch 95/3-15 (1). A process was begun shortly after this request. In 2001, a proposal for the 50 metres (160 ft) general protection zone was published, and signed by the mayor of Braga, but many structures of the Sete Fontes were excluded from the ZPE, including the two Minas das Verdosas (1 and 2), as well as the final aqueduct to Rua de Areal em Cima, which did not mention the water basin. In 2003, Sete Fontes was placed on the official evaluation for national monument status, and in May 2003, after the proposal of the IPPAR, the signed the Minister of Culture signed the decree.

In May 2009, the Ministry of Culture suggested setting up Zona de Protecção Especial (ZPE) around the Sete Fontes complex, which was published later that year (although the official definition of the ZPE was never defined). Specifically, although many of the sections of the Sete Fontes were included, the areas around Minas das Verdosas (1 and 2) and aqueduct of Rua Areal em Cima were not included. The establishment of the ZPE, included provisions for public consultation and feedback, although all claims and suggestions were summarily turned down. A petition undersigned by over 6000 persons was handed over to the president of the Portuguese parliament in mid-2010. A parliamentary committee discussed these issues, and debate occurred in parliament, after which two official statements were issued indicating the support of classifying Sete Fontes as a national monument. By law, the Sete Fontes had to be classified by end of 2010, otherwise the classification would be annulled, but on the final day of 2010, the process was extended for another year. The Portuguese Council of Ministers, on 3 March 2011 decreed that they would be proceeding with the classification of Sete Fontes as a national monument, with the official notification occurring in the Portuguese official journal (Diário da República), published in 2011, which also included the definition of the special zone of protection (ZPE). A large part of the ZPE, as defined, continues to be occupied by the hospital and its access roads.

== The water ==
Of the original aqueduct system, there still are some 13 springs providing potable water, regularly maintained by the municipal water supply division. This branch conducts periodic analysis of the water's quality, maintains a two-person staff to maintain and clean the system. The Sete Fontes continues to be used as a water resource, integrated within the city of Braga's strategic plan and providing water to fountains of the town squares Largo do Paço and Largo Carlos Amarante.

There is one public faucet, the Bica Pública das Sete Fontes (near Mina do Dr. Amorim) that is regularly maintained and monitored (almost monthly) by the local authority of São Vítor. There also was a faucet (Poça da Monte? near Mina das Verdosas 1), but it was destroyed when the access road to the hospital was built.

The name Sete Fontes gives the impression that at some time there were seven springs. In the official document defining the special protection zone (ZEP) one can count 14 endings of underground galleries, each should be a spring. But this counting ignores three underground galleries (Adelino Correia, Julio Lima and Verdosas), the spring in Respiro 1 and possibly some more springs along the underground galleries (e.g. the so-called chambers in Mina dos Orfaons and it is unclear whether one should count one or two springs for Mina das Freiras). Also, Mãe d'àgua do Dr Sampaio receives water from two aqueducts that not marked on the official map of the ZEP, so at its peak there were at least 20 springs at Sete Fontes.

The São Vitor regularly tests the water coming out of the faucet near Mãe d'àgua Amorim (actually coming from a tube placed in the Capela). Since the measurements started the water has always been found to be considered suitable for drinking.

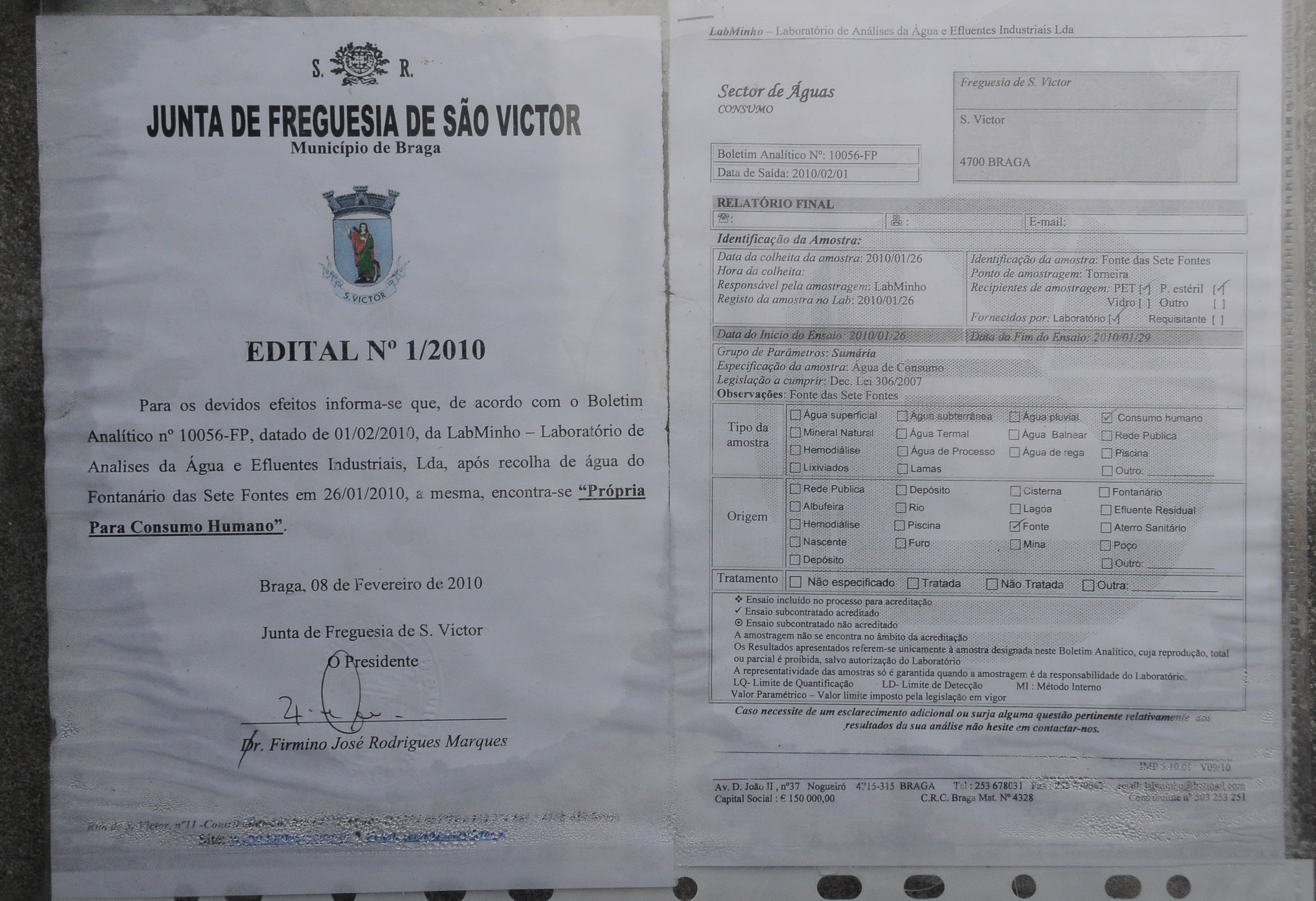
A water treatment analysis evaluation from the civil parish of São Vítor certifying the quality of its waters

The water basin seems to be mainly fed by rain water in the valley of Sete Fontes. The water flux response is in most springs quite quick to rain and some springs give very little water in dry periods giving the impression that the spring water is mostly rain water rather than coming from underground aquifer under pressure.

The mineral content of the water various both in time and place. The same spring can give different levels depending on the flux of water, many increase mineralisation with higher flux. The lower lying springs in general yield higher mineral content that those at higher altitudes, but there are also differences for some elements that does not follow this trend. This has been attributed both to differences in sediment and rock layer throughout the system but also influences of domestic, industrial waste water and agricultural fertilisers seeping into the ground water.

== Architecture ==
The Sete Fontes complex consists of a cluster of aqueducts and structures stretching over 3,500 metres (11,500 ft) in the parish of São Vítor. The network is segmented into 14 underground galleries and six junctions in an ensemble built in stone.

The more prominent features of this system, are the commonly referred to as Mães de Água ('Mothers of Water'). These structures are built in Baroque style, consisting of a cylindrical structure and vaulted dome, trimmed by a circular cornice and topped with pinnacles. Each Mães de Água is decorated with a coat of arms representing its patron. Although rarely used in their identification today, the Mães de Água include (from the highest elevation): Mina do Dr. Amorim (1752), Mina do Dr. Nozes, Mina do Dr. Sampaio, Mina dos Órfãos (1804), Mina das Freiras, Mina do Dr. Alvim (de cima), Mina do Dr. Alvim (de baixo) (1744), Mina Preta, Mina das Verdosas 1, Mina das Verdosas 2 (destroyed in 2011) and Mina de Xedas/Chedas and Mina de Adelino Correia (destroyed in 1995). There are also two untitled cylindrical structures, breathers (Portuguese: respiros), near the Mina dos Órfãos and Mina das Freiras.

The Sete Fontes is a unique specimen of 18th-century Portuguese engineering, that includes the creation of galleries and visitors chambers, the layout of underground and surface channeling of water, and the attempt to follow the valley's natural topography. The pipes are delicate works, its elements fitting snugly together, its waters branching across the system for almost 100 metres (330 ft) between junctions.

== Short description of the various structures ==
=== Names of the different types of structures ===
Apart from old documents at the Mayor's Office there are at least four documents that include the names of the structures of Sete Fontes:

- Maria Rodrigues 2012, Hidrodinâmica do sistema de captação das Sete Fontes : contributo para o ordenamento do território do Município de Braga
- Nascimento Fonseca 1937, Projeto de aproveitamento da àgua das Minas das Sete Fontes.
- Alberto Costa 1956, Mina das Sete Fonte: estrutura do complexo na zona de captação.
- Plano Director Municipal de Braga 1999/2000
- Eduardo Pires Oliveira 2001, A Freguesia de São Victor Braga

There are some inconsistencies in the names. The above documents use different names for the same structures. Some parts are named of the land owner (at the time of naming: Sampaio and Amorim) and others are named after the institution that paid for its construction (e.g. Mina dos Orfaons and Mina do Pópulo). This also gave the constructor the right to a certain flux of water.

The more emblematic structures are alternatively called Mãe d'àgua ('mother of water'), castelo ('castle'), caixa ('box') or cúpula ('dome'). The more simple entrances are called caixas ('boxes') but sometimes person simply refer to the name of the underground gallery (mina). There are also three structures above ground which does not include a door, the respiros ('breaths'). Part of the aqueduct consists of tubings made out stone placed at ground level. There are also a number of underground springs (nascentes) but most of them have not been designated any specific name, except the one called the chapel (capela) in one of the side galleries of the Mina Chã das Sete Fontes.

It is a bit unclear when the complex got the name Sete Fontes. In the municipal archives the term Sete Fontes is used at least as early as 1737. Certainly much of the structures were in place by then, even though it that is before the dates engraved in many head stones, i.e. 1744, 1752, 1761 and 1804.

=== Structures visible above ground ===
==== Caixas ====
The caixas ('boxes') are entrances to the underground galleries. The caixas are fairly simple structures in granite. Only one is adorned with a heraldic shield. Only one has both year and name inscribed. Sometimes they are referred to as boca da mina ('mouth of the mine').

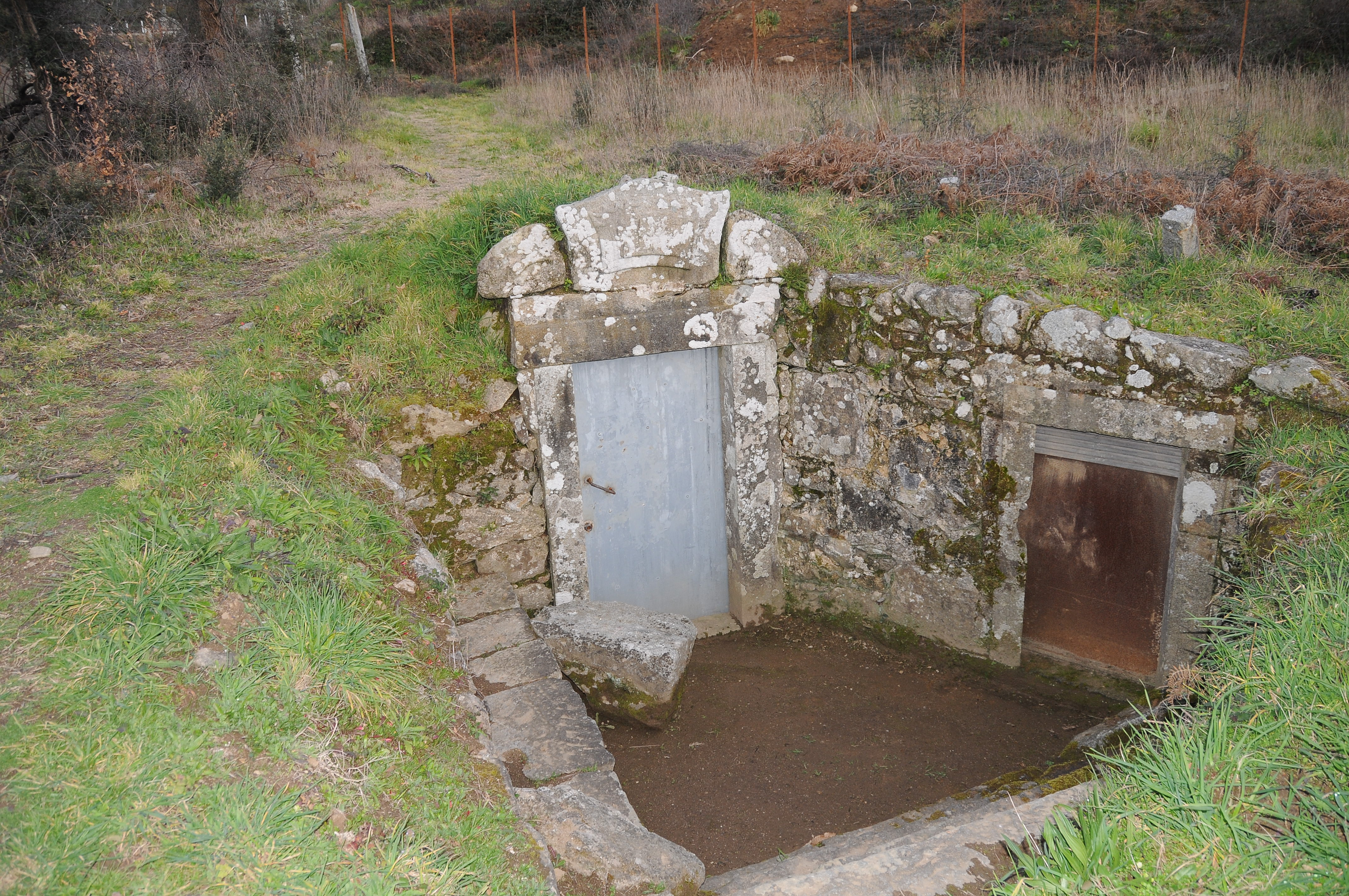
Caixa da Mina do Dr Nozes

===== Caixa mina dos Nozes =====
Caixa mina do Dr Nozes (also known as: Mina das Nozes). It is almost entirely below ground level, and the main portion is only visible when one stands next to it. There are two doors, the left one has a heraldic shield and a date. One leads to the main aqueduct, but is only to walk in a few meters. It has a heraldic shield with a year engraved, 1761 (or 1767). The other door leads to the underground gallery of Mina das Nozes.

===== Caixa mina do Pópulo =====
Simple structure, halfway sunken into the ground. It was rediscovered during the clearing of trees in an area in late 2014 (October/November?) Unknown interior.

===== Caixa mina dos Orfaons =====
Entrance to Mina dos Orfaons (also known as Mina dos Orfãos and Mina dos Orfãos de São Caetano) named after the institution that paid for its construction. Has the year 1804 engraved above the entrance. From here water leads in underground stone tubings to the nearby Respiro.

===== Caixa mina Preta =====
Entrance to the Mina Pinheiro de baixo ('lower pine tree mine'), also known as Mina Preta ('black mine'). Simple construction with a rusted metal door. A metal pipe is seen leading from it into the neighbouring Mãe d'àgua do Dr Alvim de baixo. Some parts of the system were retrofitted with metal tubings in the first half of the 20th century.

===== Caixa mina das Chedas =====
Simple structure with metal door. It is also known as Mina das Xedas. From it leads an aqueduct of stone pipes about 20 metres down to the main aqueduct (conduta geral).

===== Caixa das Verdosas 1 =====
Caixa das Verdosas 1 (also known as Mina Versosas) was partially destroyed when building the access road to the hospital. Simple structure. The water is not obviously leading to any aqueduct. Drawings from 1937 indicate an aqueduct leading to Mãe d'àgua do Dr Alvim de baixo. The nearby house use the water for irrigation.

===== Caixa das Verdosas 2 =====
Caixa das Verdosas 2 (also known as Mina Julio Lima and Lavarincho) was completely destroyed/dismantled during the construction of the access road to the hospital. A mock up entrance was constructed afterwards. Júlio Lima had a property in the parish of São Vicente. There is a street called Rua das Verdosas nearby this (former) underground gallery. A dug down aqueduct (stone piping) leads down to Mãe d'àgua do Dr Alvim de baixo.

===== Caixa mina Adelino Correia =====
Was destroyed in 1995. Drawings from early 20th depict a simple structure with junction between the aqueduct from Mina Adelino Correia and the main aqueduct (conduta geral: main conduit).

==== Mães d'água ====
Mãe d'água means 'mother of water''; this is misleading since there are no springs inside, just junctions of aqueducts. They are similar in build: cylindrical, with an entrance and rounded cupula. In 2014 they were all given a new whitish coat of cement. Inside is a "separation swirl" where the aqueducts meet, this lets sand and silt deposit thus removing from them the flowing water. The three upper have entrances to the underground whereas the lowest only has aqueducts coming, and also acts as the tool shed for the aqueceiros ('the water men').

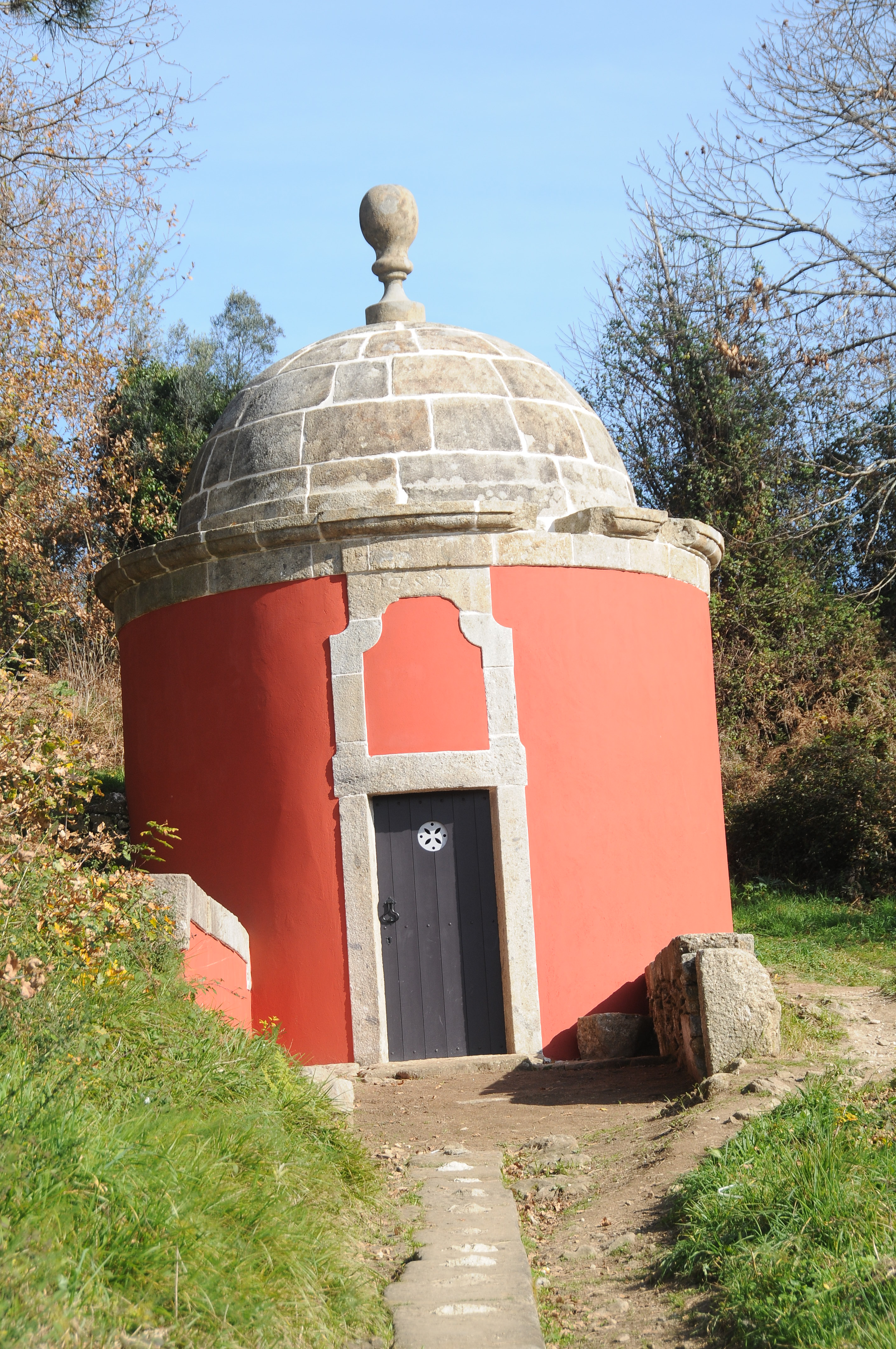
Mãe d'água do Dr. Sampaio on a slight incline

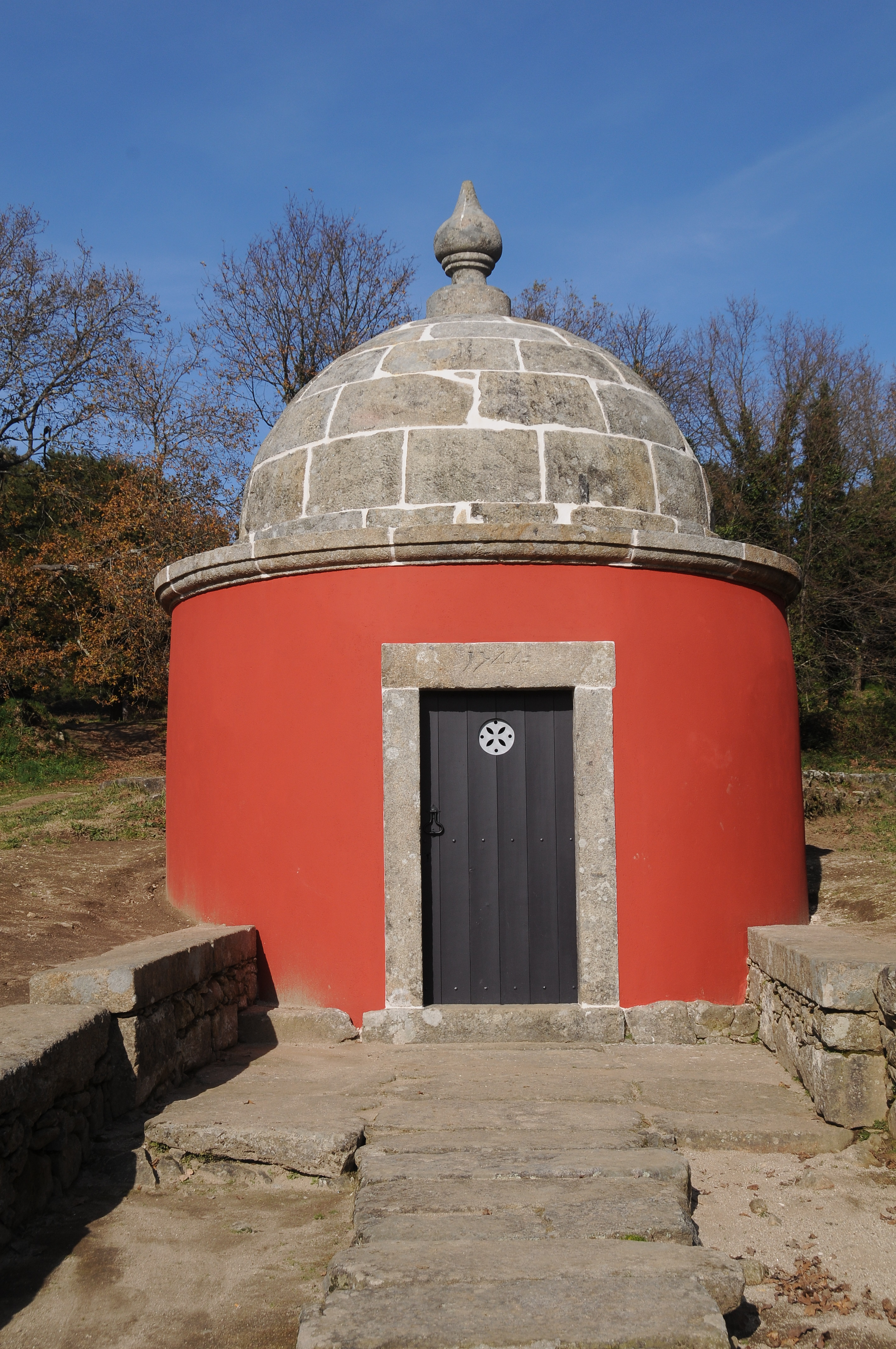
Mãe d’água do Dr Alvim em cima

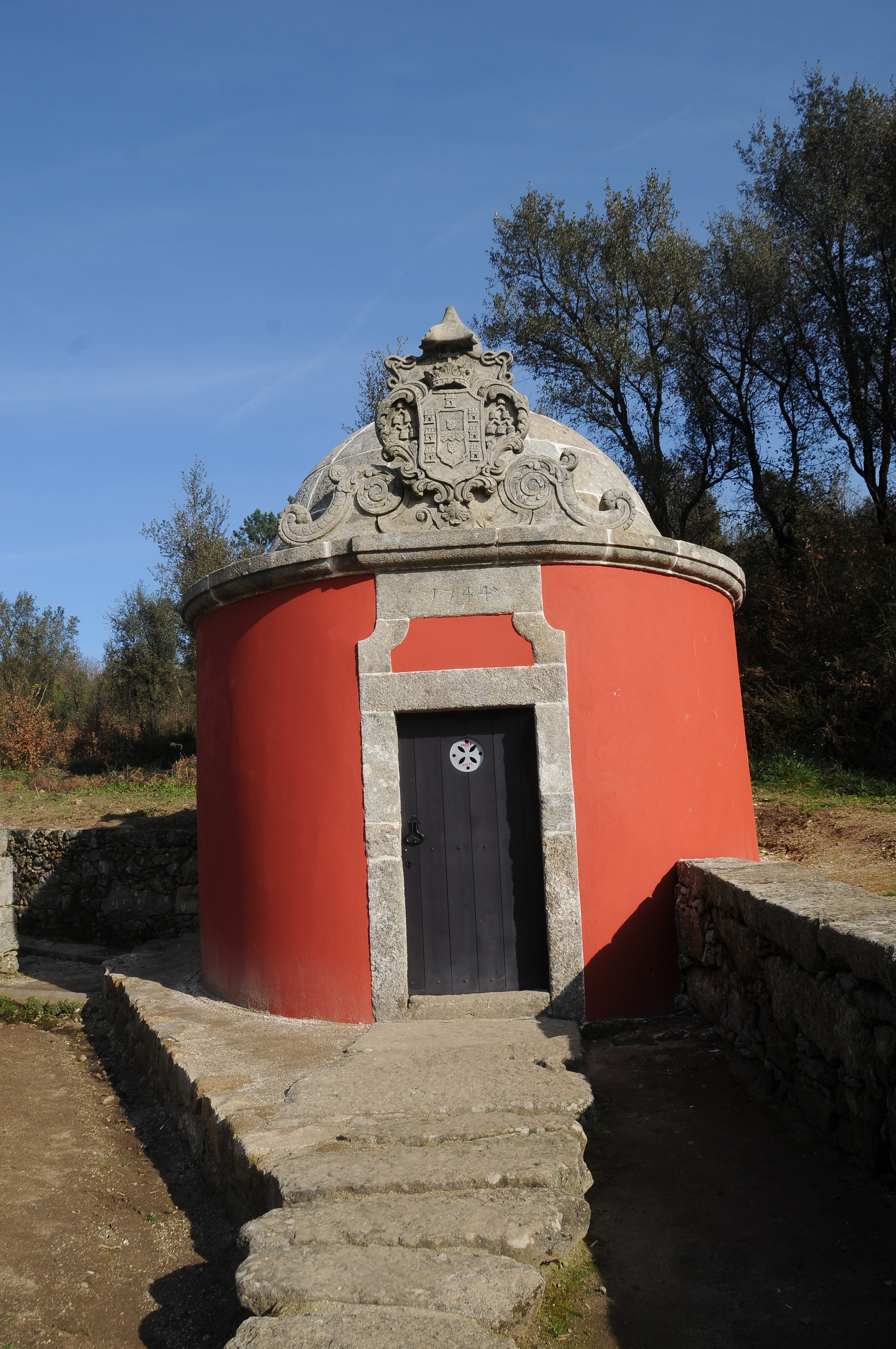
Mãe d’água do Dr Alvim em baixo, refurbished and with the heraldic shield back in place

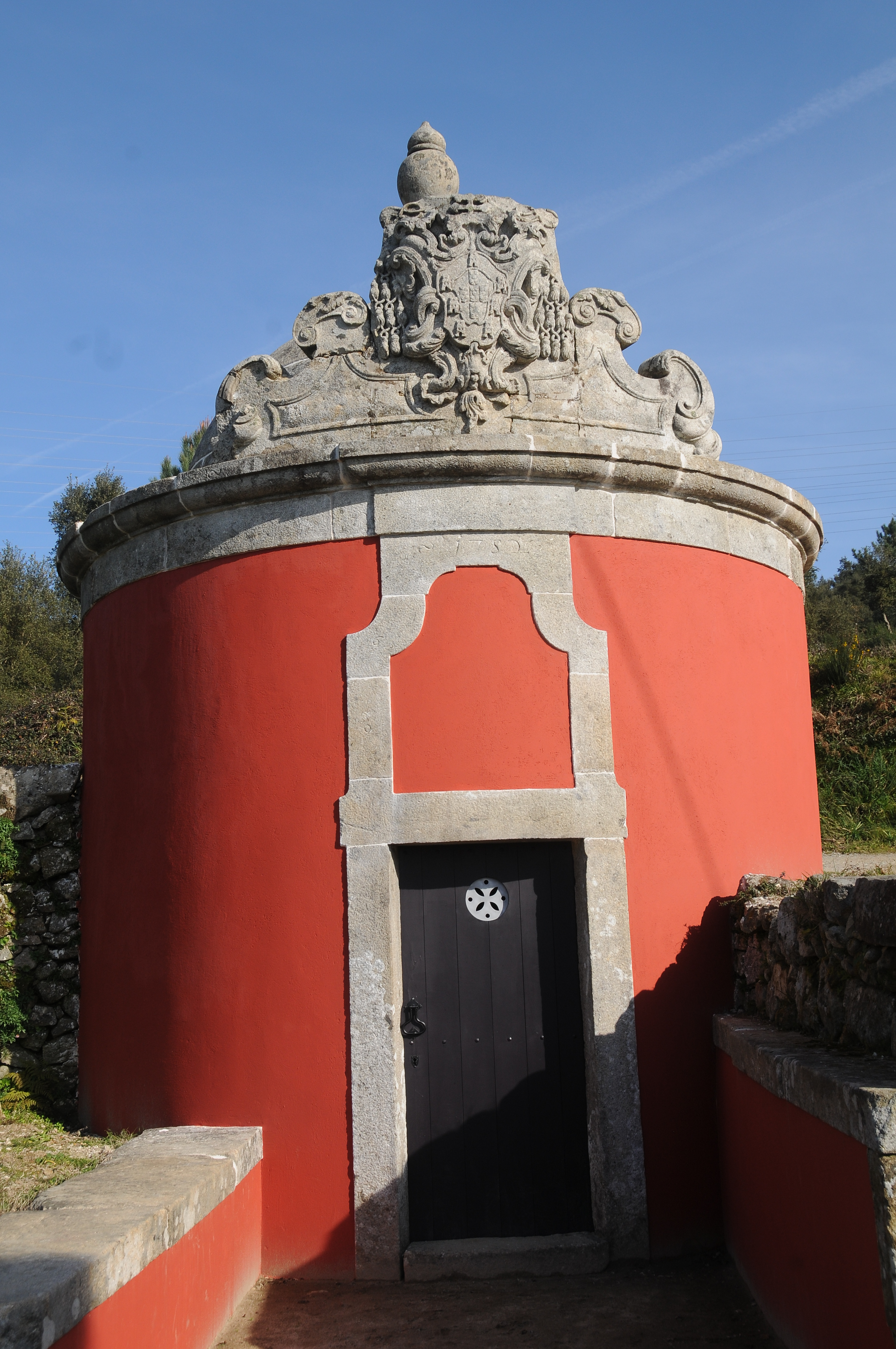
Mãe d’água do Dr Amorim

===== Mãe d'água do Dr Amorim =====
The first (or at least) the upper most structure above ground (also called Caixa n 1). With the Bragança family's large heraldic shield and the year 1752 engraved above the entrance. Water leads from two underground galleries: Mina Chã das Sete Fontes (from southeast) and Mina dos Ribeirinhos (from northeast). From here the water leads in an underground aqueduct (stone pipes) to Caixa Mina do Dr Nozes.

===== Mãe d'água do Dr Sampaio =====
Cylindrical structure (also called caixa n 3) which receives water from Mina do Pópulo and Caixa da Mina do Dr Nozes (conduta geral). The former is quite simple in its finish. As it leads in the Mãe d'água one can find an outline drawing of the adornment at the top of this Mãe d'água. Inside is a "separation swirl". From here the main conduit in ground-level stone tubing continues down to the respiro next to Mina dos Orfaos. Next to the entrance is an Egyptian-style eye engraved into the stones of a low wall.

===== Mãe d'água do Dr Alvim em cima =====
Cylindrical structure (also called caixa n 5 and Mãe d'água Gemea de cima: upper twin mother of water) with the year 1744 engraved above the entrance. It receives water from the main conduit (via the Respiro next to Mina dos Orfaons) and Mina do Pinheiro de cima ('upper pine tree mine') which in turns receives water from Mina das Freiras ('nuns' mine'). It has a "separation swirl" inside. From here the main conduit in ground-level stone tubing continues down to Mãe d'água do Dr Alvim de baixo.

===== Mãe d'água do Dr Alvim em baixo =====
Very similar to its twin (caixa n 6 and called the lower twin) and also with 1744. It receives water from 3 directions: 1. Main conduit (from the upper twin), 2. Mina Preta (Mina Pinheiro de baixo) and 3 Minas Julio Lima (Lavarincho/Verdosas 2) and Verdosas (Verdosas 1). The latter have dried out (see more in the below sections on the aqueduct). Inside is a "separation swirl". Only tubings lead here. Notably iron tubing from Mina Preta, which obviously is not part of the original design. From here the water leads into town in the main down conduit at ground level via the now-destroyed Mina do Adelino Correia.

==== Respiros ====
The structures called respiros ('breaths') or ventosa ('cup') with small openings at the top have unclear function. All three of them are situated on top of a spring, from which lead an underground gallery (mina).

A popular hypothesis is that somehow the underground galleries need to breathe in order not to create suction that would prevent the water to flow. But the entrances which recently were given doors would yield ample flux of air through the underground galleries. Perhaps it is more to let bats in so that they can eat bugs living in there.

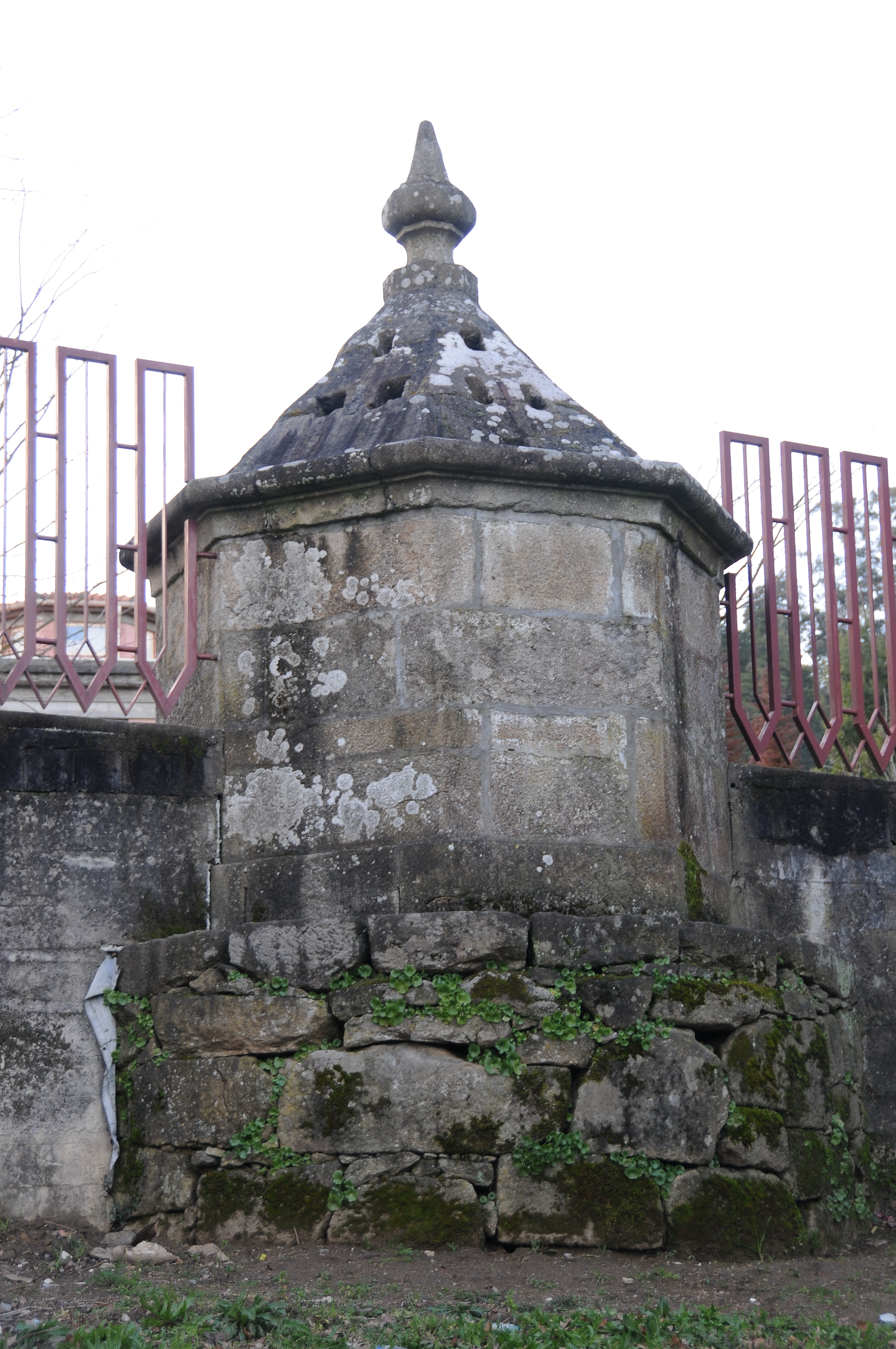
Respiro da Mina das Freiras incorporated into the wall of First College

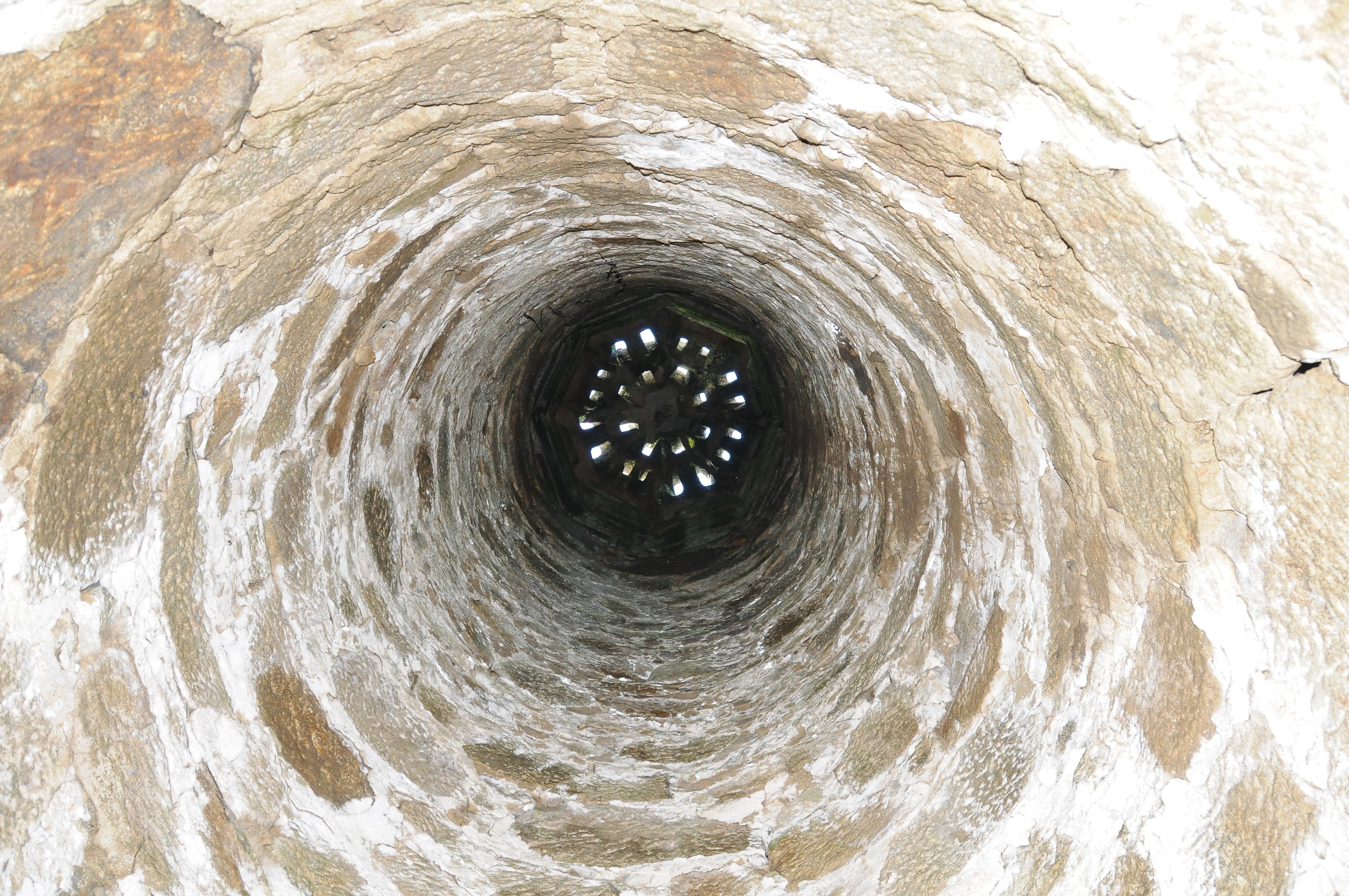
Respiro da Mina das Freiras, interior

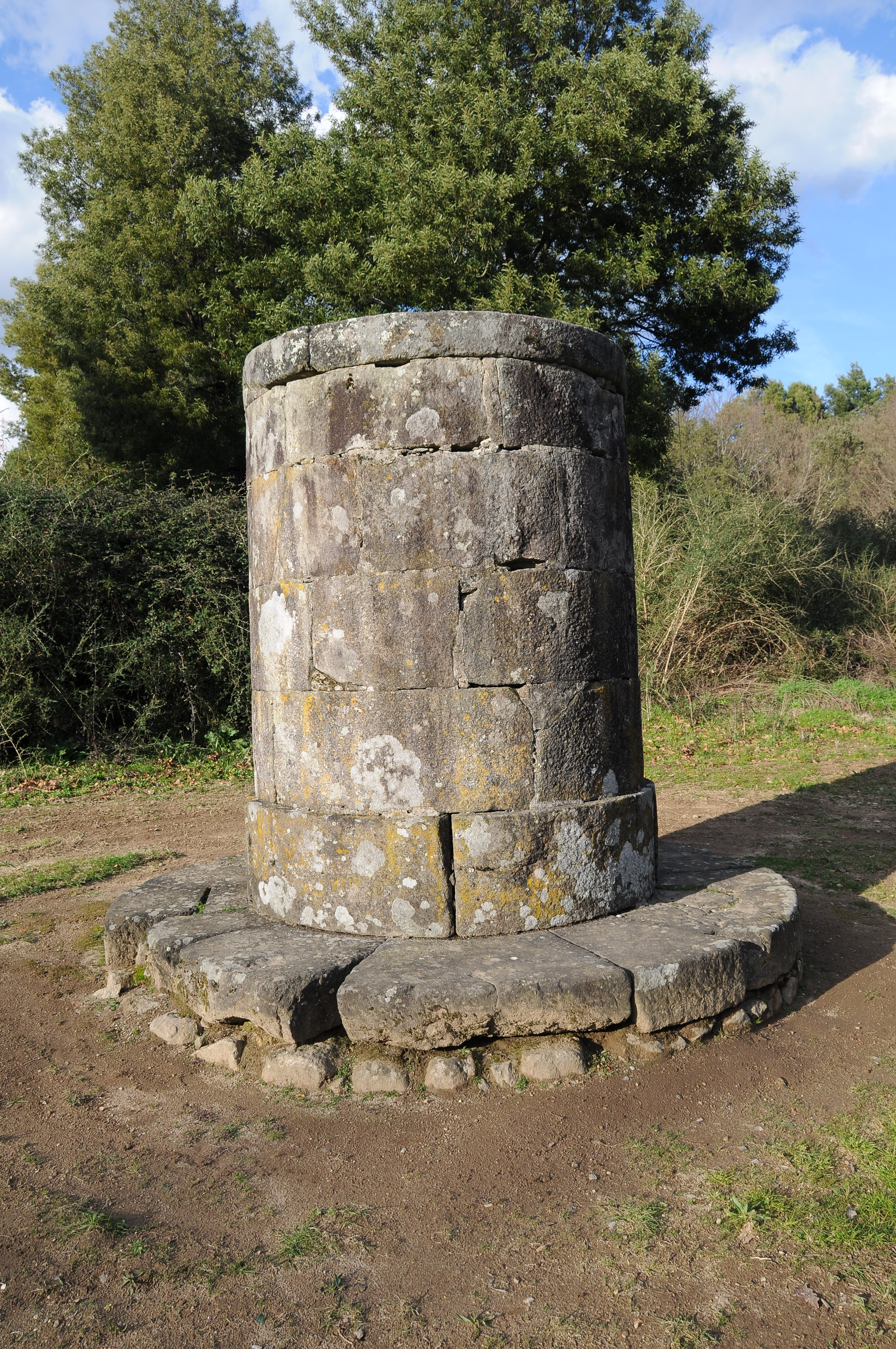
Respiro 2

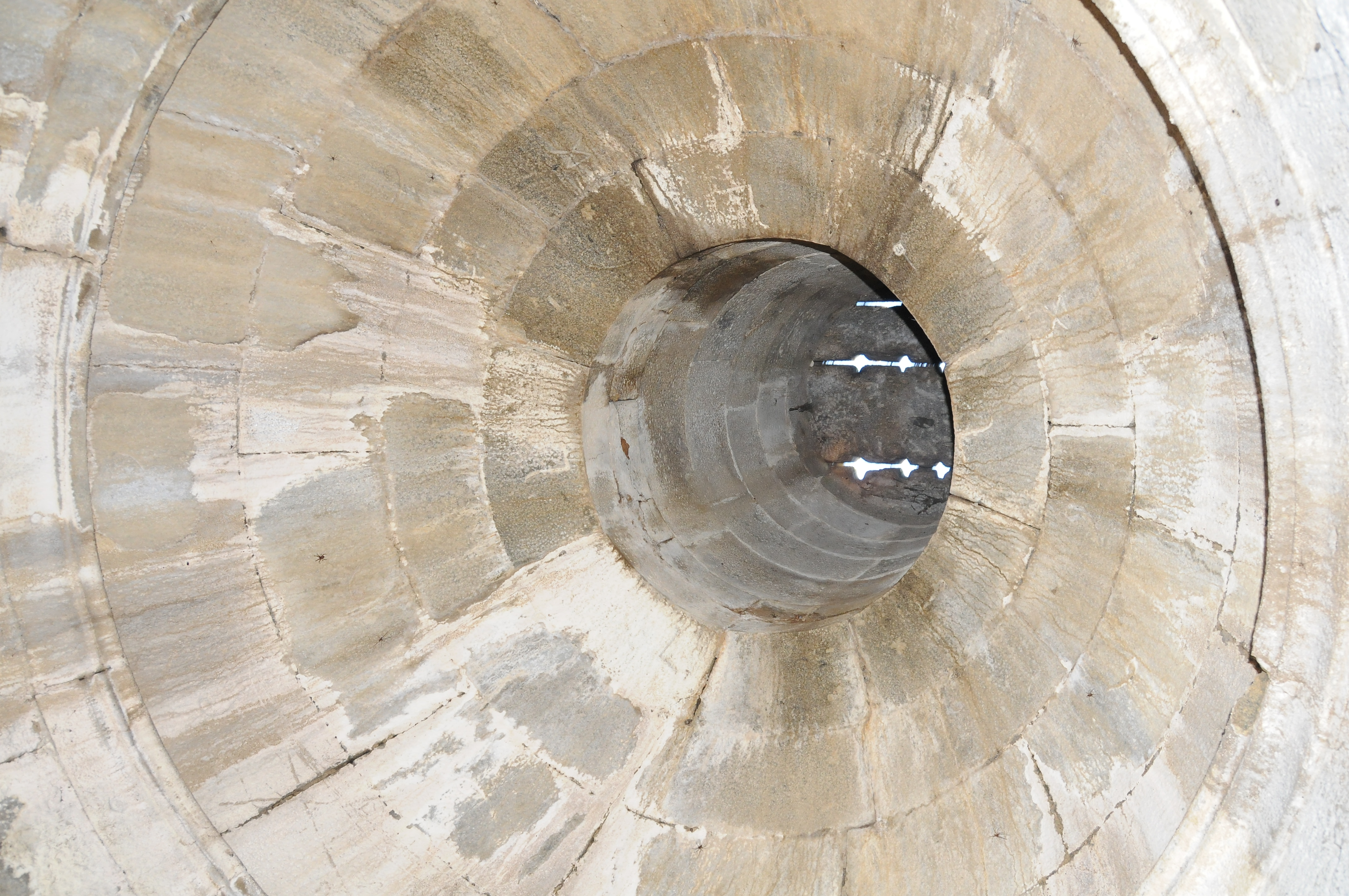
Respiro 2, interior

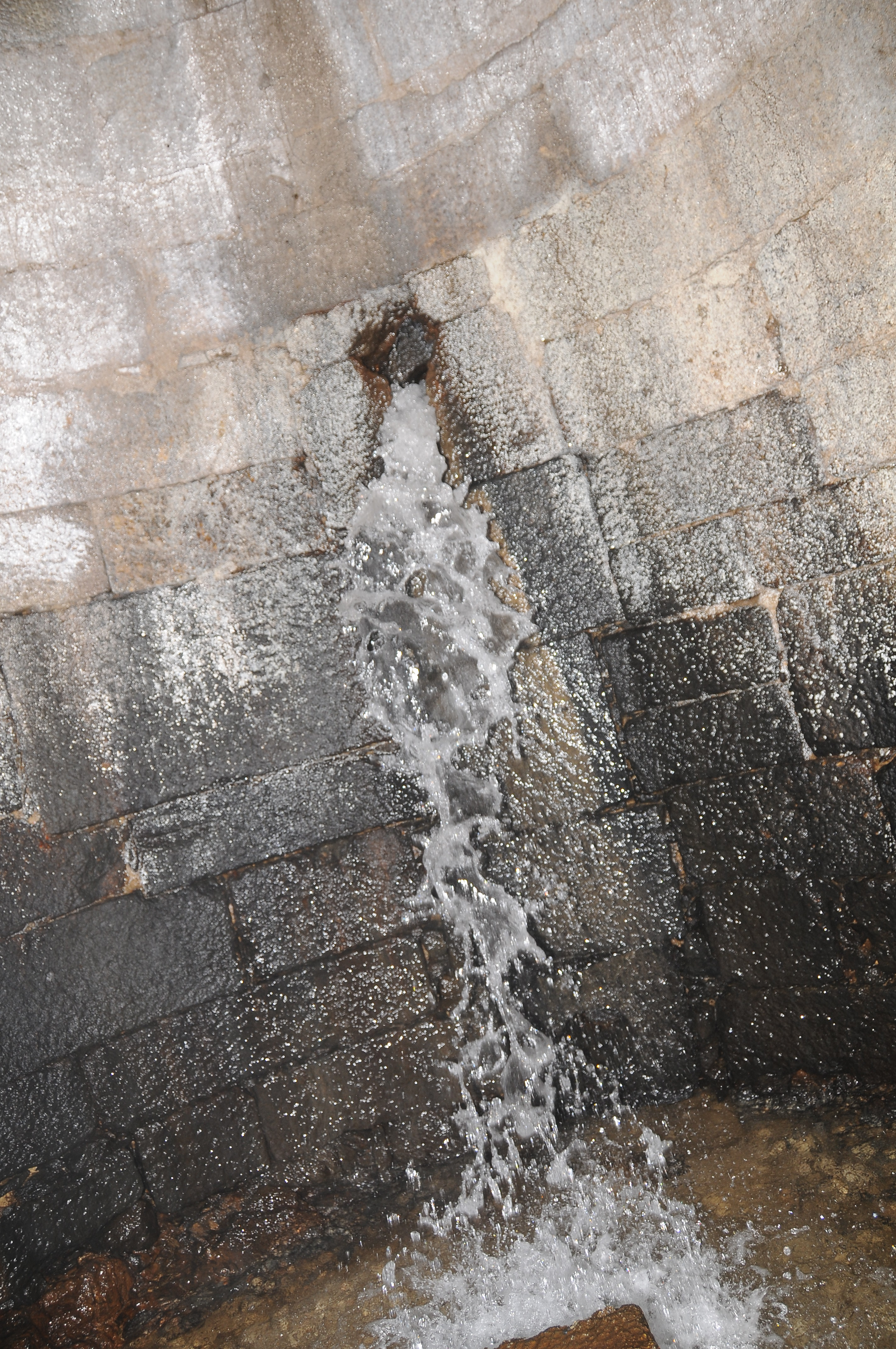
Respiro 1, interior, water from the main conduit

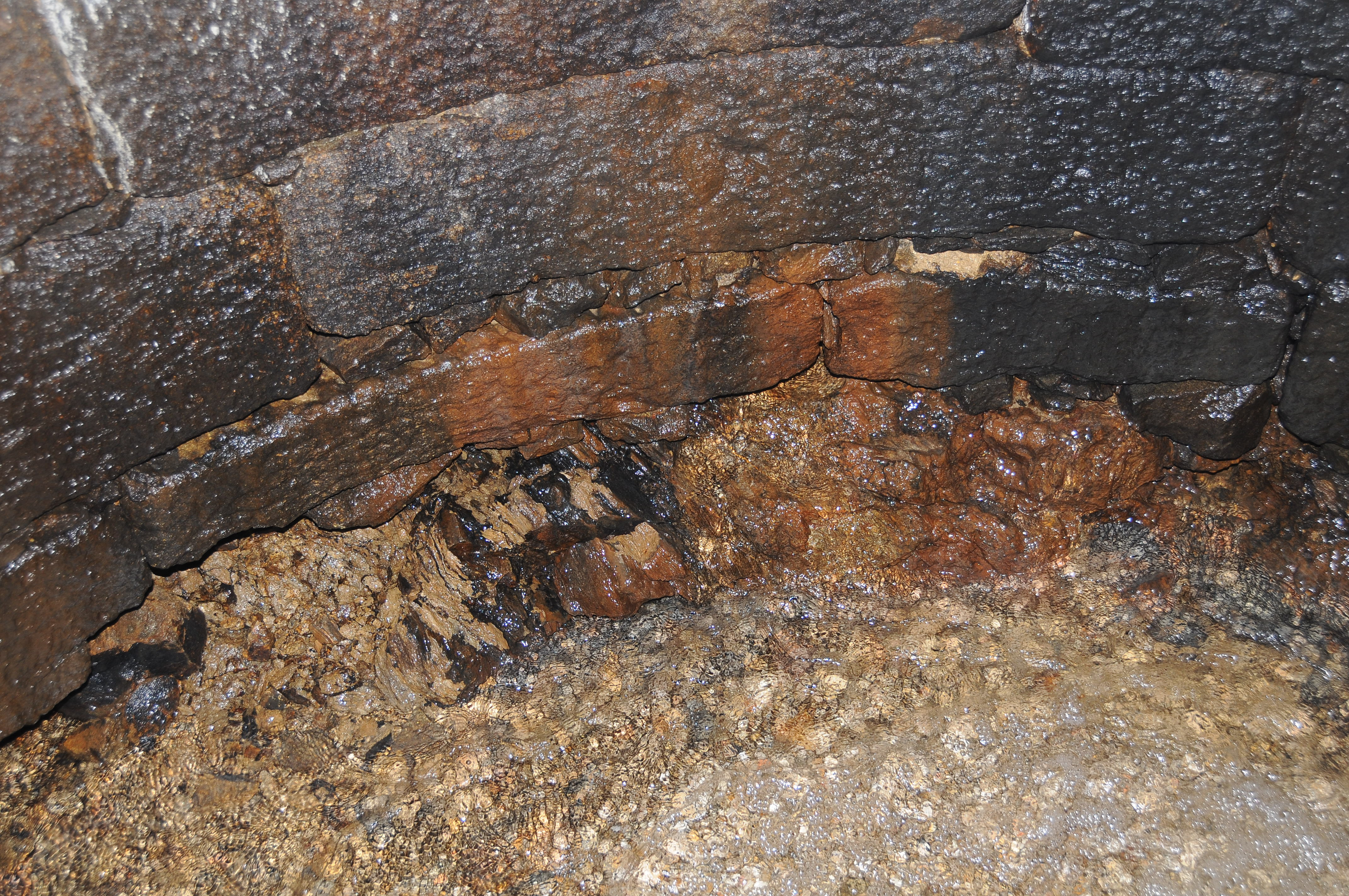
Respiro 1, interior, spring

===== Respiro 1 =====
Cylindrical structure with a flat roof with small holes in it (also called respiro 1). Has its own spring and receives water from both the main conduit (via Mãe d'àgua do Dr Sampaio) and Mina dos Orfaons. From outside it looks quite narrow but inside the base is it almost three meters wide, normally full with shallow water. At the top one can see a vault that inside the platform one sees from the outside, above which extends almost three meters of more narrow cylinder (approximately one meter inner diameter). From here water leads in an underground gallery to Mãe d'àgua dr Dr Alvim de cima.

===== Respiro 2 =====
Cylindrical structure very similar to Respiro 1. From here water leads in an underground gallery to Mãe d'àgua dr Dr Alvim de cima. From spring to rooms is more than five meters. The spring once had dried out when the Mina Preta (Pinheiro de baixo) was built (or repaired); it essentially extends under this Respiro.

===== Respiro da Mina das Freiras =====
Octagonal structure with a pointy top approximately two meters wide, also with holes in it. It has spring the only gives water after heavy rain, but also receives water from a spring in an upstream underground gallery. From spring to roof is approximately five meters. From here the water leads in underground gallery to the underground gallery of Mina Pinheiro de cima.

==== Aqueduct in stone tubes ====
The tubings of the aqueduct seen at ground level is made out of local granite (there are two kinds in this area), and so is everything else. The sections are little over one meter long with square cross section of four dms and bore of one dm radius. Each section has a male and female end which fits fairly snugly into its neighbour. Most have a square hole upwards which is capped with a stone and a kind of concrete. The same concrete is used to seal the gaps in the connections. The upper hole is opened in order to clean the tubings, especially to remove the so-called fox tails (raposas) which are bundles of tree roots invading the aqueducts. Some loose pieces of the aqueduct are on display next to Mãe de àgua do Dr Alvim de cima.

Aqueduct in tubes made of stone. This interlinks some of the mães de água in the Sete Fontes complex

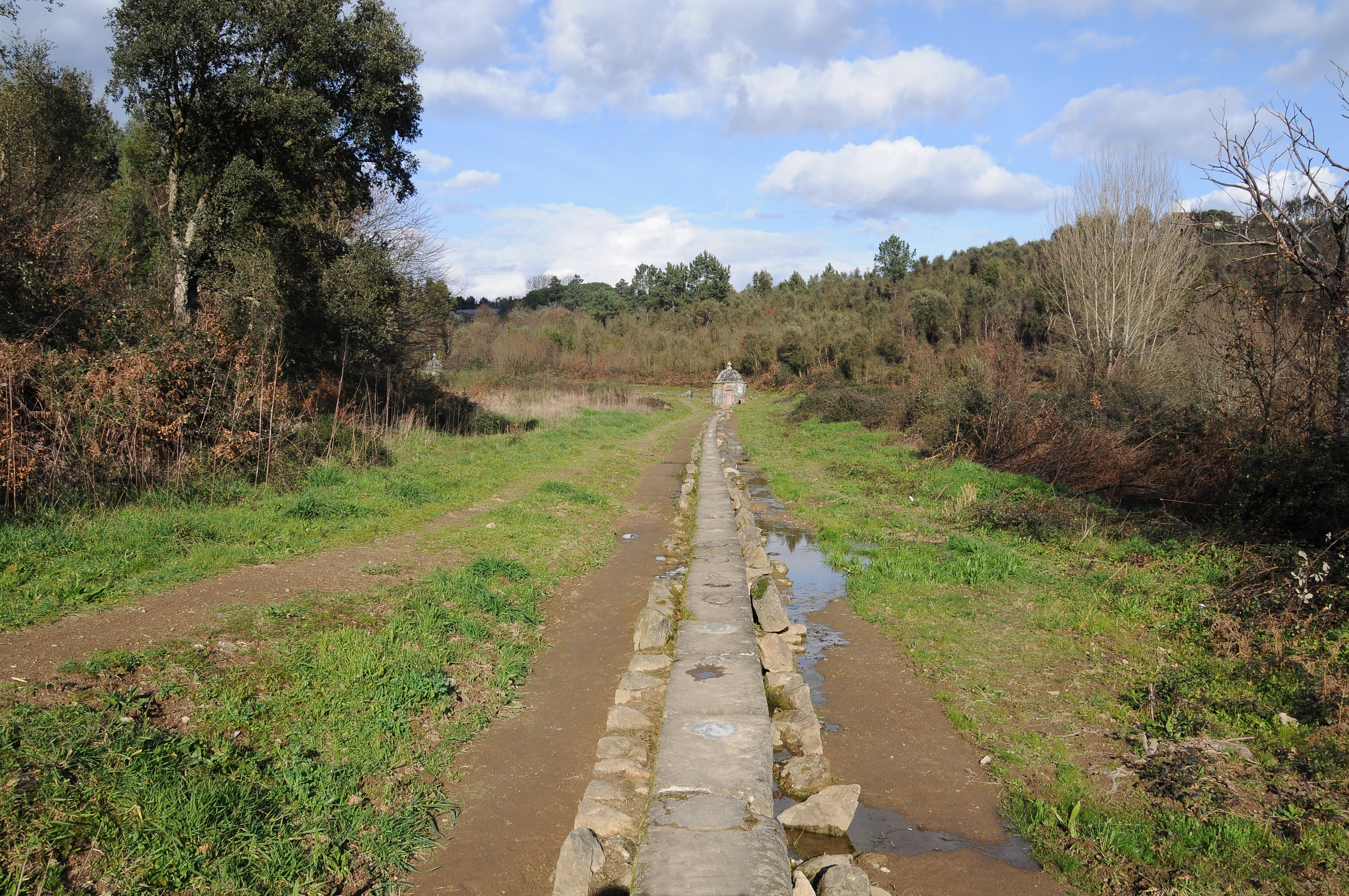
One of the covered aqueducts carrying water between each junction

===== Below MdA Sampaio =====
From here the main conduit is an unusually steep slope for approximately 20 metres before it goes underground.

===== Above MdA Alvim em cima (two) =====
The two sections above Alvim em cima are actually the ceilings of underground galleries.

===== Below MdA Alvim em cima =====
The main conduit is almost horizontal here, and surrounded by meter-high walls on both sides. One side with stone, the other is mainly dirt, but eventually becomes the outer wall of Mina Preta. On some sections one can see the pillow (almofada) finish that is said be a Roman design. In some sections one can see wedge-formed grooves on the outer edges. This is from the use of wooden wedges that are put in water to expand to cut the stones.

===== Below MdA Alvim em baixo =====
From here the main conduit leads to the conduit from Mina Chedas and to Adelino Correia. For a little over 100 metres the aqueduct is resting on stones, and is in fact above-ground level. It makes some twists and turns on its way. On most days one can see water leaking out. During and after heavy rain the flux of leaks is quite dramatic. Some parts seems to have rows of stones creating a kind of external support structure.

===== Below Chedas =====
A short ground-level main conduit (approximately 20 metres) leads into the main conduit. The stones in this section are much more uneven (less worked) than other sections. Sections do not have square cross sections. From here the ground level aqueduct leads to Adelino Correia.

===== Below Adelino Correira =====
It is unclear whether the section next to the former Mina Adelina Correia is still intact. The section is now underground because of the construction works here in 1995. There is an aqueduct upstream and downstream. Downstream the aqueduct is partially intact all the way until the road Rua Areal de cima. Some parts are contained within high stone walls; some parts are under or partially under residential buildings. The last bit until the Rua Areal de cima de aqueduct is placed in an "alley" between villas. From here in leads the underground aqueduct into town. Probably in more than one place aqueducts from other springs feed (or did feed) into the system.

=== Structures below ground ===
The underground galleries are fairly unexplored. The guided tours normally only show the two underground galleries leading into Alvim de cima and Mina Chã das Sete Fontes up to the chapel. The water men (aqueceiros) obviously have seen most of the system. But some parts, especially the sections under the parking lot of the new hospital, are only good for crawling.
