= José de Bragança, Archbishop of Braga =

Catholic archbishop (1703–1756)

José
- Archbishop of Braga
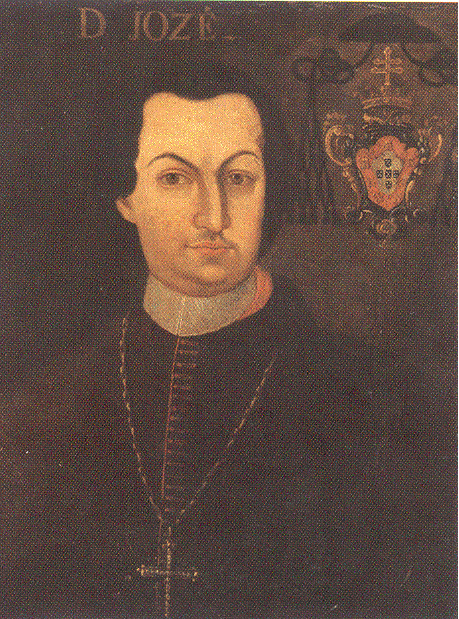
- Born: 6 May 1703; Lisbon, Kingdom of Portugal
- Died: 3 June 1756 (aged 53); Ponte de Lima
- Burial: Sete Fontes
- House: House of Braganza
- Father: Pedro II of Portugal

José of Braganza, Archbishop of Braga (Portuguese pronunciation: [ʒuˈzɛ]; 6 May 1703 – 3 June 1756) was a natural son of Portuguese King Peter II and a Portuguese lady named Francisca Clara da Silva.

He was born on 6 May 1703 in Lisbon, Portugal. He studied at the University of Évora and achieved a doctorate in Theology. He became Archbishop of Braga in 1739 and was consecrated in 1741. He built in Braga the Sete Fontes, a water supply system. He died on 3 June 1756 in Ponte de Lima and is also buried there. He was succeeded in his position by another natural-born noble, Gaspar of Braganza, Archbishop of Braga, illegitimate son of his half-brother John V of Portugal.
