= Basil the Confessor =

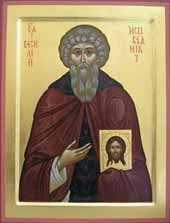

Confessor
- Feast: February 28

There are two individuals known as Basil the Confessor (Greek: Βασιλείος ό Ομολογητής); one was a monk and the other Bishop of Parium.

== Venerable Basil the Confessor ==
Venerable Basil the Confessor was an Eastern Orthodox saint who lived in the 8th century. During the iconoclast controversy, Basil and his teacher Procopius of Decapolis, were imprisoned by the Byzantine Emperor Leo III the Isaurian. Both languished in prison until the death of the emperor in 741, when they were released and returned to their monastery. He died peacefully in 750 and is venerated February 28 (New Style; March 13 Old Style).

== Basil the Confessor, Bishop of Parium ==
Basil was a monk who was elected Bishop of Parium. In February 754 Emperor Constantine V convened a synod at Hieria to condemn the veneration of icons. Basil refused to sign the orders for their destruction, He subsequently avoided any dealings with the iconoclasts. For this he suffered much persecution, hunger and deprivation. He is commemorated April 12.

== See also ==
- Byzantine Iconoclasm
