= Guinoch =

Scottish saint

Saint Guinoch
- Died: c. 838; Scotland
- Venerated in: Buchan
- Canonized: Pre-Congregation
- Feast: 13 April

St Guinoch, also known as Guinochus or Guinoc, was a Scottish saint. He is believed to have been a counsellor to Kenneth MacAlpin and, through prayer, aided in seven victories over the Picts in one day.
