= Victor of Braga =

Saint Victor of Braga
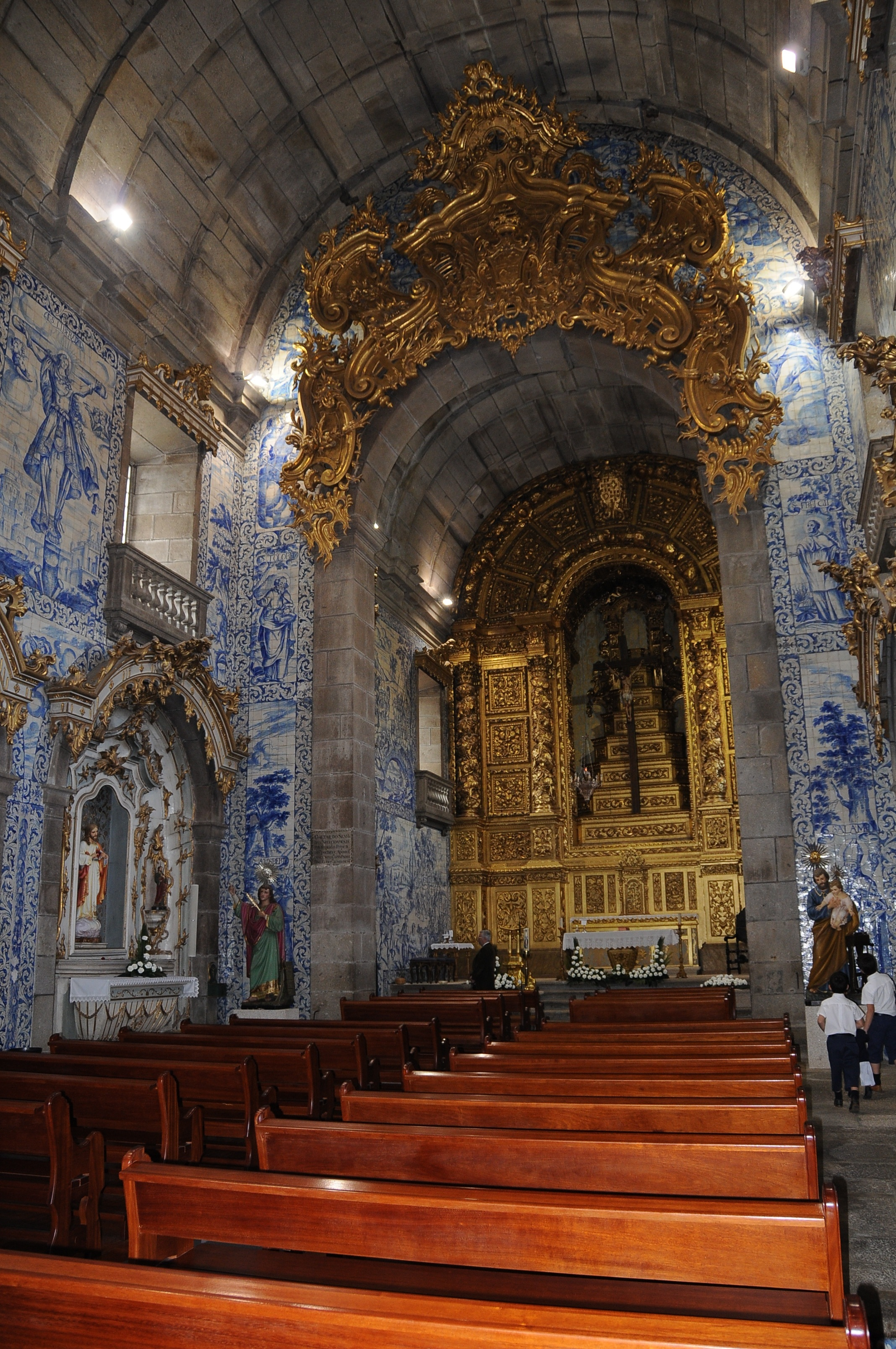
- Interior of Sao Victor Church, in Braga, Portugal.
- Born: c. 3rd century AD; Fafe, Braga, Hispania Tarraconensis, Roman Empire (modern-day Portugal)
- Died: c. 300 AD; Braga, Hispania Tarraconensis, Roman Empire (modern-day Portugal)
- Venerated in: Roman Catholic Church; Eastern Orthodox Church
- Feast: 12 April

Victor of Braga (born c. 3rd century AD - died c. 300 AD), also known as Saint Victor (Portuguese: São Victor), was a Portuguese Christian martyr. His feast day is 12 April.

== Sources ==
Victor's very existence has frequently been refuted. His story is based on the Breviary of Braga, which was credulous enough to admit all of the forgeries of "Julian Perez", the alleged eleventh century priest of Toledo. However, a short passion from the Abbey of Santo Domingo de Silos in the Province of Burgos, written at the end of the 11th century, could reflect an ancient tradition. It says that Victor met one day with the procession that accompanied the image of a pagan god and that, confessing himself a Christian, he was sentenced to death and beheaded.

== Monks of Ramsgate account ==
The Monks of Ramsgate wrote in their Book of Saints (1921),

Victor (St.) M. (April 12)
(4th century) A victim of the persecution under Diocletian at Braga in Portugal. He was only a catechumen when arrested as a Christian, and, being almost at once beheaded, was baptised in his own blood (A.D. 300 about)

== Butler's account ==
The hagiographer Alban Butler (1710–1773) wrote in his Lives of the Fathers, Martyrs, and Other Principal Saints under April 12,

St. Victor of Braga, Martyr

This city was a populous resort of the Romans; on which account it was watered with the blood of many martyrs in the persecution of Dioclesian. The names only of SS. Victor, Sylvester, Cucufas, Susana, and Torquatus have reached us. Their triumphs are honoured in that church, and recorded by Vasæus in his chronicle, and other Spanish historians. St. Victor, who is mentioned in the Roman Martyrology on the 12th of April, was a catechumen, who, refusing to sacrifice to idols, was condemned to lose his head, and baptized in his own blood. See F. Thomas ab Incarnatione. Hist. Portug. Sæc. 4, c. 6, p. 218.

== Sources ==
- Butler, Alban (1821), The lives of the fathers, martyrs, and other principal saints, vol. 4 This article incorporates text from this source, which is in the public domain.
- Kagan, Richard L. (2010). Clio and the Crown: The Politics of History in Medieval and Early Modern Spain. Baltimore: Johns Hopkins U Press. pp. 257–261. ISBN 978-1-4214-0165-2.
- San Victor de Braga (in Spanish), Real Academia de la Historia, 2018
- St. Augustine's Abbey, Ramsgate (1921). The Book of saints : a dictionary of servants of God canonized by the Catholic Church. London: A. & C. Black, ltd. OCLC 671676136. This article incorporates text from this source, which is in the public domain.
