= Monteluco =

Frazione in Umbria, Italy

Coordinates: 42°43′22″N 12°45′11″E

Monteluco is a frazione (borough) of the comune of Spoleto, in Umbria, central Italy. It is located on a limestone mountain covered by woods, at 780 metres (2,560 ft) over the sea level.

In 2021, Monteluco had a population of just 20 residents.

== Etymology ==
The name of Monteluco derives from its sacred grove (lucus).

== Sacred grove ==
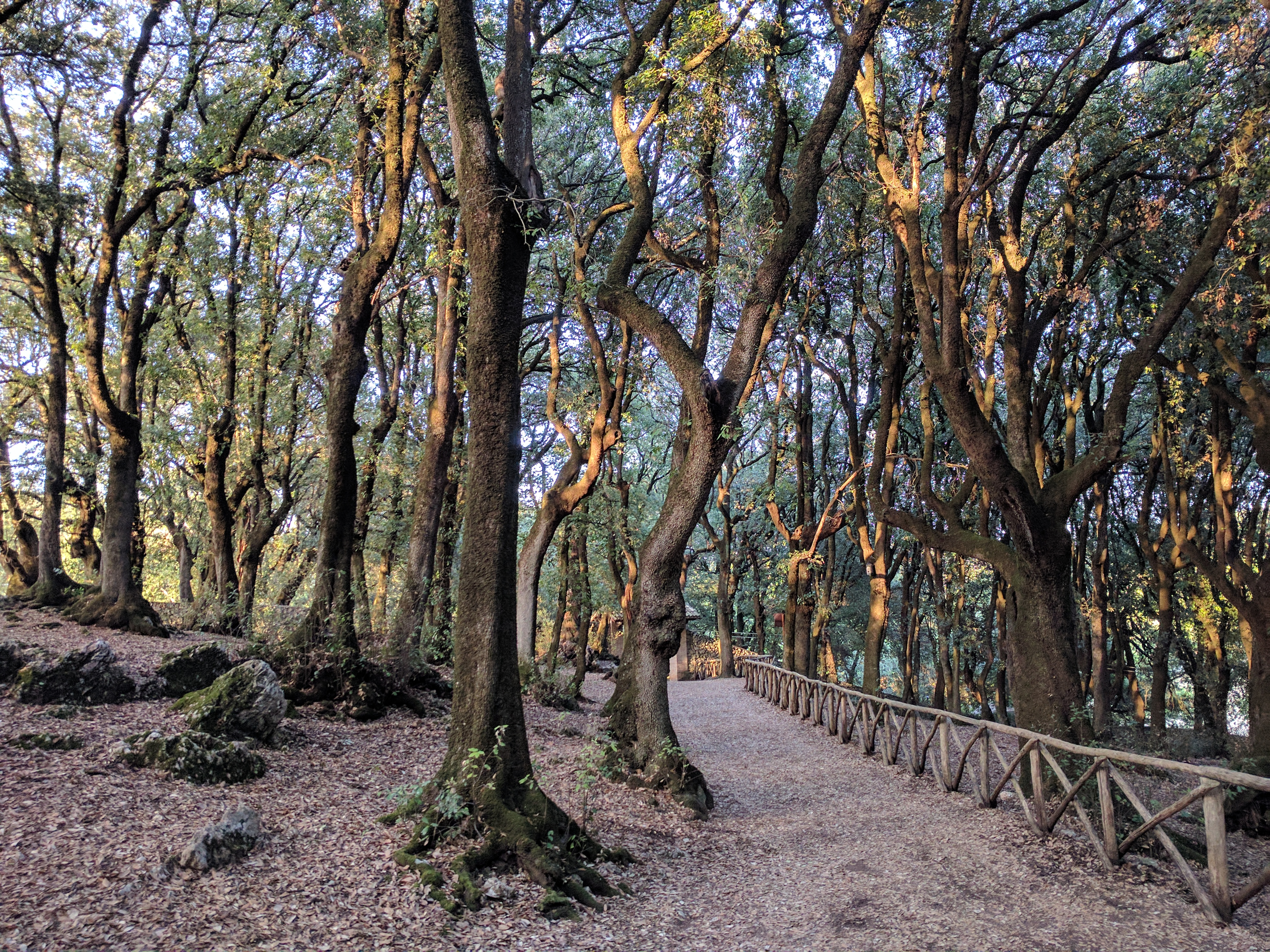
Sacred grove of Monte Luco

The dense vegetation of the sacred grove covers the hill, which rises to 800 metres (2,600 ft) above sea level and is linked to Spoleto by the Ponte delle Torri. The long-standing significance of the forest is reflected in its name and in the Lex Spoletina, a late 3rd-century BC set of stone inscriptions in archaic Latin establishing penalties for the profanation of the sacred wood dedicated to Jupiter.

The sacred grove is characterized by evergreen holm oak, unusual so far from the sea or large lakes, and provides habitat for large beetles, the green woodpecker, the great spotted woodpecker, the short-toed treecreeper, and the Eurasian nuthatch. Numerous hermitages and caves can be reached by the footpath running through the wood.

Along the ascent of Monteluco are the church of San Pietro, erected at the beginning of the 5th century on an ancient villa and a notable example of Umbrian Romanesque architecture, and the Romanesque church of San Giuliano, founded in the 12th century on the site of a 6th-century building dedicated to a martyr of the same name. Higher up stands the sanctuary of Monteluco together with a small church dedicated to Saint Catherine of Alexandria.

The sacred grove of Monteluco is designated as a Site of Community Importance.

== Hermitages ==
Monte Luco (also spelled Monteluco) is covered with dense woodland, forming a notable landscape together with the Rocca. Tradition holds that a temple of Apollo once stood there. The mountain, entirely covered with holm oaks, was a sacred wood in the Roman period and later became a place favored by the first hermits arriving from Syria in the 5th century. It still preserves ancient hermitages and religious buildings.

The hermitages developed as places of religious retreat associated with Isaac of Syria and later ascetic traditions near the city.

=== Hermitage of San Francesco ===
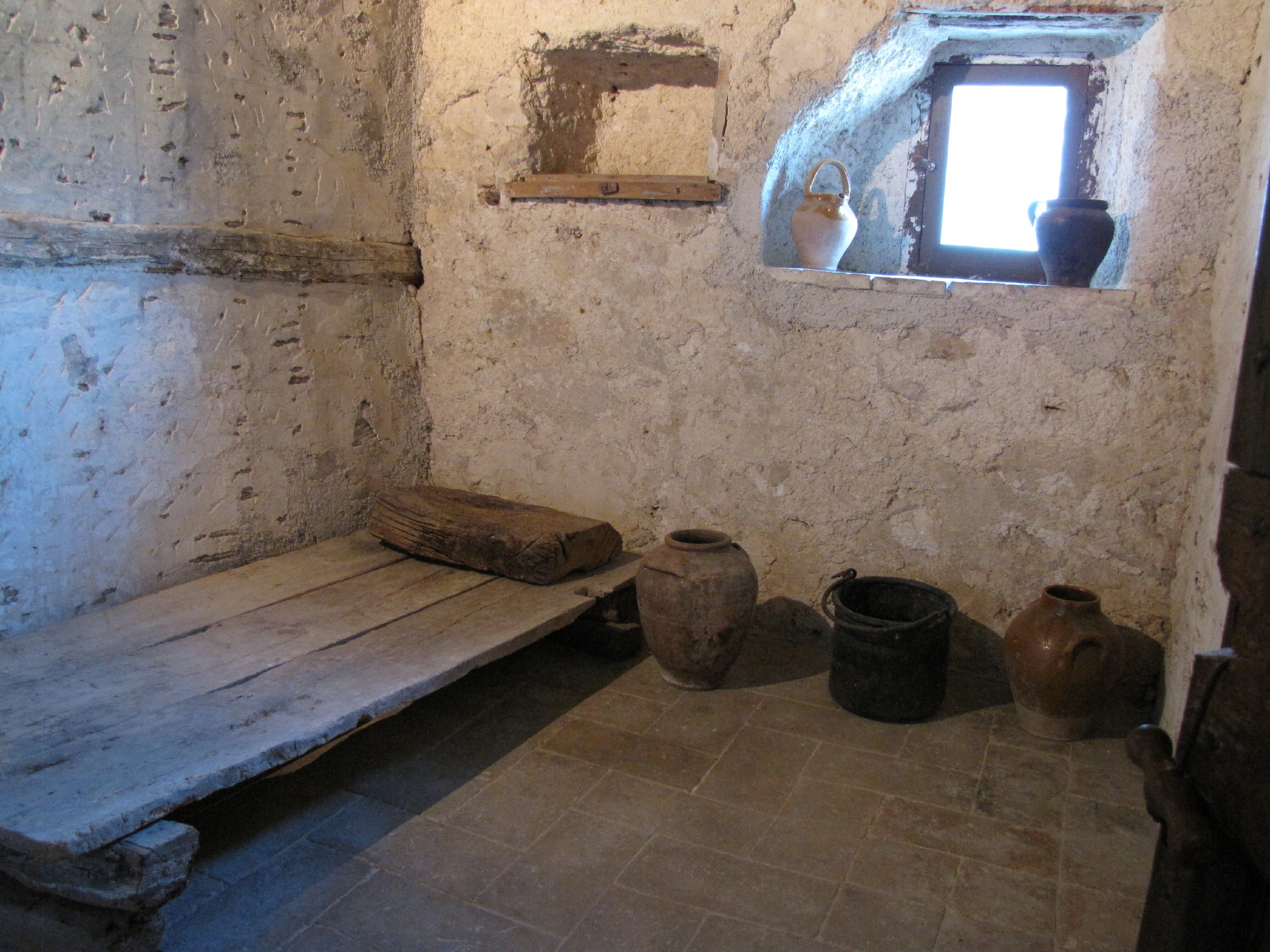
13th-century eremitic cell at the Hermitage of San Francesco

The sanctuary of San Francesco stands at Monteluco at an elevation of 800 metres (2,600 ft), near an ancient sacred wood and some natural caves frequented by hermits from the early Christian period. In the 5th century communities of hermits fleeing Syria settled there. According to tradition, in 1218 Francis received from the Benedictine monks the small chapel of Santa Caterina, which forms the oldest nucleus of the hermitage.

The ancient oratory of San Francesco is located within the convent, and the stone supporting the altar base is held to have been used by Francis of Assisi as a bed. In the courtyard, the Well of San Francesco is associated with the tradition that Francis indicated the place to dig for water at the highest point, where water then sprang forth.

Within the enclosure stands the chapel of Santa Caterina d'Alessandria, also called the Porziuncola of Monteluco, linked to the Syrian hermit movement of the 6th century. In the small courtyard to the left is the chapel of San Bernardino, erected ten years after the saint's death and altered several times.

=== Santi Francesco d'Assisi and Caterina d'Alessandria ===
The small church of Santi Francesco d'Assisi and Caterina d'Alessandria preserves several works inside. The right chapel is dedicated to Blessed Leopold of Gaiche, represented in the altarpiece by Giuseppe Moscatelli; his body is enclosed in a transparent case beneath the altar. On the high altar is the painting Madonna and Child with Saints Catherine, Francis, Anthony of Padua and Joseph by Lazzaro Baldi. Above, at the sides of the altar, are Madonna delle Grazie, a 17th-century painting by Carlo Dolci, and Decapitation of Saint Catherine, a copy by Ercole Gennari after Guercino.

The carved altar and tabernacle in fine wood are the work of Friar Bernardino di Collelungo and date to the late 17th century. Walnut cupboards of the same period beside the altar, commissioned by the Spoletan patrician Francesco Martorelli, preserve a collection of Murano glass reliquaries donated by the Barberini and Cibo families. A small walnut choir is placed in the apse.

=== Other hermitages ===
On the mountain is the hermitage of the Grazie, containing three marble sculptures representing Saint Roch, Tobias with the Angel, and the Deposition from the Cross.

The abbey of San Giuliano is traditionally held to date back to the 5th century. It was founded by Isaac of Syria, who settled in Spoleto after fleeing persecution.

The hermitage of Sant'Antimo is among the religious buildings on Monteluco.
