= Saint Callinicus of Cernica =

Romanian Orthodox saint and bishop

Archbishop
- Born: Constantin Antonescu; 7 October 1787; Bucharest
- Died: 11 April 1868 (aged 80); Pantelimon, Ilfov, Romania
- Resting place: Cernica Monastery
- Venerated in: Eastern Orthodox Church; Eastern Catholic Churches
- Canonized: 21 October 1955
- Feast: 11 April

Saint Calinic of Cernica (b. October 7, 1787 – d. April 11, 1868) was a monk, church founder, theologian, abbot of Cernica Monastery, and bishop of Râmnicu Vâlcea, the first Romanian saint recognised by Romanian Orthodox Church, on October 21, 1955.
