= June 5 (Eastern Orthodox liturgics) =

Day in the Eastern Orthodox liturgical calendar

Eastern Orthodox liturgical calendar
June 4	June 5	June 6
June 5 O.S. ≍ June 18 N.S. June 5 N.S ≍ May 23 O.S.

An Eastern Orthodox cross

June 5 in Eastern Orthodox liturgical calendars is a feast day and a day of commemoration of saints and martyrs. Although some Orthodox churches use the Revised Julian Calendar and others use the traditional Julian calendar, the fixed commemorations for their respective June 5 are broadly the same, no matter which calendar is used. (Note: Despite the dates being the same, the days to which they refer typically differ by 13 days. The notation Old Style or O.S. is sometimes used to indicate a date in the traditional Julian Calendar (the "Old Calendar"). The notation New Style or N.S. indicates a date in the Revised Julian calendar (the "New Calendar").)

== Saints ==
- The Holy 10 Martyrs of Egypt (c. 305-311): (Note: "In Egypt, the birthday of the holy martyrs Marcian, Nicanor, Apollonius, and others, who suffered a glorious martyrdom in the persecution of Galerius Maximian.") (Note: "SAINTS MARCIAN, Nicander, Apollonius, Leonidas, Arius, Gorius, Hyperechius, Seleniades, Irene, and Pambo, were the names of ten martyrs in Egypt, probably in the persecution of Diocletian. They were placed in a sort of walled pound, exposed to the full glare of the sun, in the hot summer. Water was put within easy reach, but they were told that if they drank, it would be regarded as an abjuration of Christ. The ten martyrs sang hymns till, parched with thirst, their voices grew hoarse. Although they suffered agonies of thirst, not one of them would touch the water, but died in hope of that heavenly Paradise where they might drink of the Water of the River of Life.") (Note: Name days celebrated today include: Apollon, Apollo (Ἀπόλλων).)

- Marcian, Nicander, Hyperechius, Apollonius, Leonides (father of Origen), Arius, Gorgias, Selenia, Irene, and Pambo.

- Martyr Conon of Rome, drowned at sea.
- Martyr Christopher of Rome, by the sword.
- Martyr Nonnus. (Note: The memory of the holy martyr Nonnos is preserved in the Jerusalemitic Canonarion, and his feast day was kept by the Church of Jerusalem, at the church located on the Mount of Olives.)
- Hieromartyr Dorotheus of Tyre, Bishop of Tyre (362) (Note: "At Tyre, St. Dorotheus, a priest, who suffered much under Diocletian, but survived until the reign of Julian, under whom his venerable age was crowned with martyrdom, he being then one hundred and seven years old.") (Note: Name days celebrated today include: Dorotheos (Δωρόθεος); Dorothea, Dorothy (Δωροθέα).)
- Hieromartyr Theodore of Tyre, Bishop of Tyre (c. 361-363) (Note: His memory is not recorded in the Synaxaria, however it is preserved in the 'Patmiako Codex'. He was martyred at the age of 97 years old.)
- Saint Dorotheus of Thebes (c. 395)
- Venerable Anubius, confessor and anchorite, of Scetis (4th century)
- Venerable Theodore the Wonderworker, hermit of the Jordan (6th century)
- Venerable Abba Dorotheus of Gaza (c. 620)
- Saint Plutarch, Archbishop of Cyprus (620)

== Pre-Schism Western saints ==
- Martyrs Florentius, Julian, Cyriacus, Marcellinus and Faustinus, beheaded in Perugia in central Italy under Decius (250) (Note: "At Perugia, the holy martyrs Florentius, Julian, Cyriacus, Marcellinus, and Faustinus, who were beheaded in the persecution of Decius.")
- Saint Illidius (Allyre), Bishop of Clermont in Gaul (385)
- Saint Tudno, patron saint of Llandudno (6th century) (Note: Llandudno in Wales is named after him.)
- Hieromartyr Boniface (Wynfrith), Archbishop of Mainz and Enlightener of Germany, and those martyred with him (754): (Note: "ST. BONIFACE, bishop of Mayence, who came from England to Rome, and was sent by Gregory II to Germany to preach the faith of Christ to the people of that country. Having converted large multitudes to the Christian religion, especially in Friesland, he merited the title of Apostle of the Germans. Being finally put to the sword by the furious Gentiles, he consummated his martyrdom with Eobanus and some other servants of God.") (Note: Born in Crediton in Devon in England, his baptismal name was Winfrid. At the age of five he entered the monastery in Exeter. In 718 he left England for Germany as a missionary and enlightened Bavaria, Hesse, Friesland, Thuringia and Franconia. In 723 Pope Gregory II consecrated him bishop with full jurisdiction over the Germanies. In 731 he became Metropolitan beyond the Rhine and in 747 Archbishop of Mainz. He established many monasteries and convents, including Fulda, where his relics are still venerated. He put these monasteries under the charge of English monks and nuns. He was also responsible for reorganising the corrupt Frankish Church. He was martyred in his old age, with fifty-two companions, ain Dokkum in Holland. He is known as the Apostle of Germany.)

- St. Adalar (Adalher, de), Bishop of Erfurt (755);
- Hieromartyr Eoban, Chorbishop, who preached with Sts Willibrord and Boniface and shared in the latter's martyrdom in Dokkum (754) (Note: "The sharers in the martyrdom of the great Bishop are by some authors said to have been fifty-two, but by others scarcely so many. The names of a few only have been preserved. They are: Eoban, bishop; Wintrung, Walter and Adelhere, priests; Hamund, Scirebald and Bosa, deacons; Waccar, Gundicar, Illehere and Battheulf, monks.; It can hardly be doubted that some at least of these were fellow-countrymen of St. Boniface; but not knowing which they were, and in the silence of ancient records, we can only commemorate their names.")
- Hieromartyrs Wintrung, Walter and Adelhere, priests; and, Hamund, Scirebald and Bosa, deacons, martyred with St Boniface (754)
- Monk-martyrs Waccar, Gundekar, Elleher and Hathawulf, martyred with St Boniface in Germany (754)

- Monk-martyr Felix of Fritzlar, a monk at Fritzlar in Germany, probably at the hands of heathen (790)
- Martyr Sanctius (Sancho, Sancius), soldier, at Córdoba (851) (Note: "At Cordova, in Spain, blessed Sancius, a youth, who, though brought up in the royal court, did not hesitate to undergo martyrdom for the faith of Christ, during the persecution of the Arabs.") (Note: Born in Albi in France, he was taken to Cordoba in Spain as a prisoner of war, educated at the Moorish court, and enrolled in the guards of the Emir. He was martyred by impalement for his refusal to embrace Islam.)
- Saint Meinwerk, Bishop of Paderborn (1036) (Note: He became Bishop of Paderborn in Germany in 1009. On account of his building activities, he was called 'the bishop-builder'.)

== Post-Schism Orthodox saints ==
- Saint Dorotheus the Younger, abbot, at Chiliokama on the Black Sea (11th century)
- Saint Constantine, Metropolitan of Kiev and all Rus' (1159) (Note: See: (in Russian) Константин I (митрополит Киевский). Википе́дия. (Russian Wikipedia).)
- Saint Theodore Yaroslavich of Novgorod, brother of St. Alexander Nevsky (1233) (Note: See: (in Russian) Фёдор Ярославич. Википе́дия. (Russian Wikipedia).)
- Venerable Peter of Koriša, Serbia, monk (1275) (see also: June 18 )
- Saints Agapius and Nicodemus, stewards of Vatopedi (14th century)
- New Martyr Mark of Smyrna, on Chios (1801)
- Schema-Igumen Ioann (Alexeev) of New Valamo Monastery (1958)
- Saint Elisabeta Lazăr, Schemanun of Pasărea Monastery (2014) (Note: See: (in Romanian) Elisabeta Lazăr (schimonahie). Wikipedia. (Romanian Wikipedia).)

=== New martyrs and confessors ===
- New Hieromartyr Michael Votyakov, Priest (1931)
- New Hieromartyr Nicholas Ryurikov, Priest (1943)

== Other commemorations ==
- Icon of the Mother of God of Igor (1147) (Note: See: (in Russian) Игоревская икона Божией Матери. Википе́дия. (Russian Wikipedia).)
- Translation to Chernigov of the relics of the Blessed Igor-George, tonsured Gabriel, great prince of Chernigov and Kiev (1150)
- Uncovering of the relics (1599) of Venerables Jonah (1561) and Bassian, monks, of Pertoma (ru) and Solovki (1599) (Note: See: (in Russian) Иона и Вассиан. Википе́дия. (Russian Wikipedia).)

== Icon gallery ==
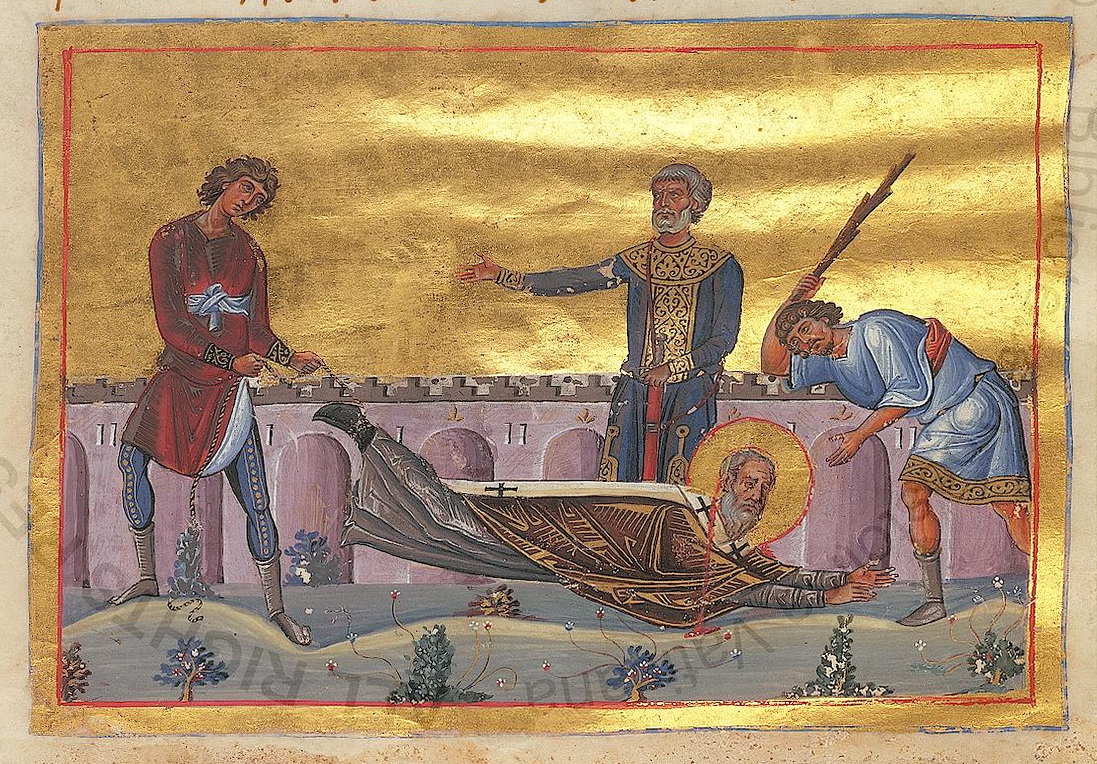
Hieromartyr Dorotheus of Tyre, Bishop of Tyre.

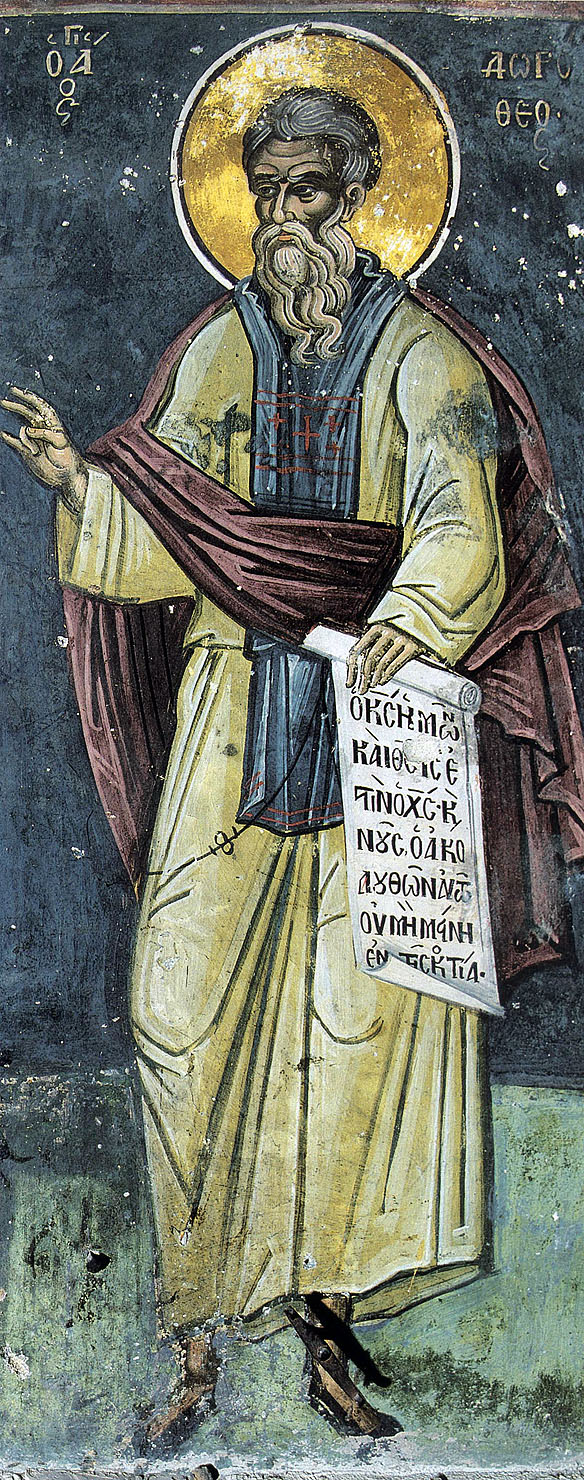
Venerable Abba Dorotheus of Gaza.

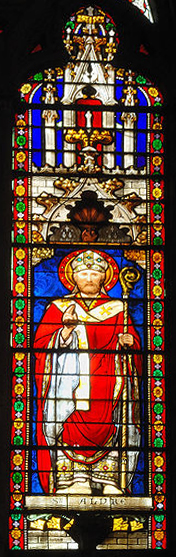
St. Illidius (Allyre), Bishop of Clermont.

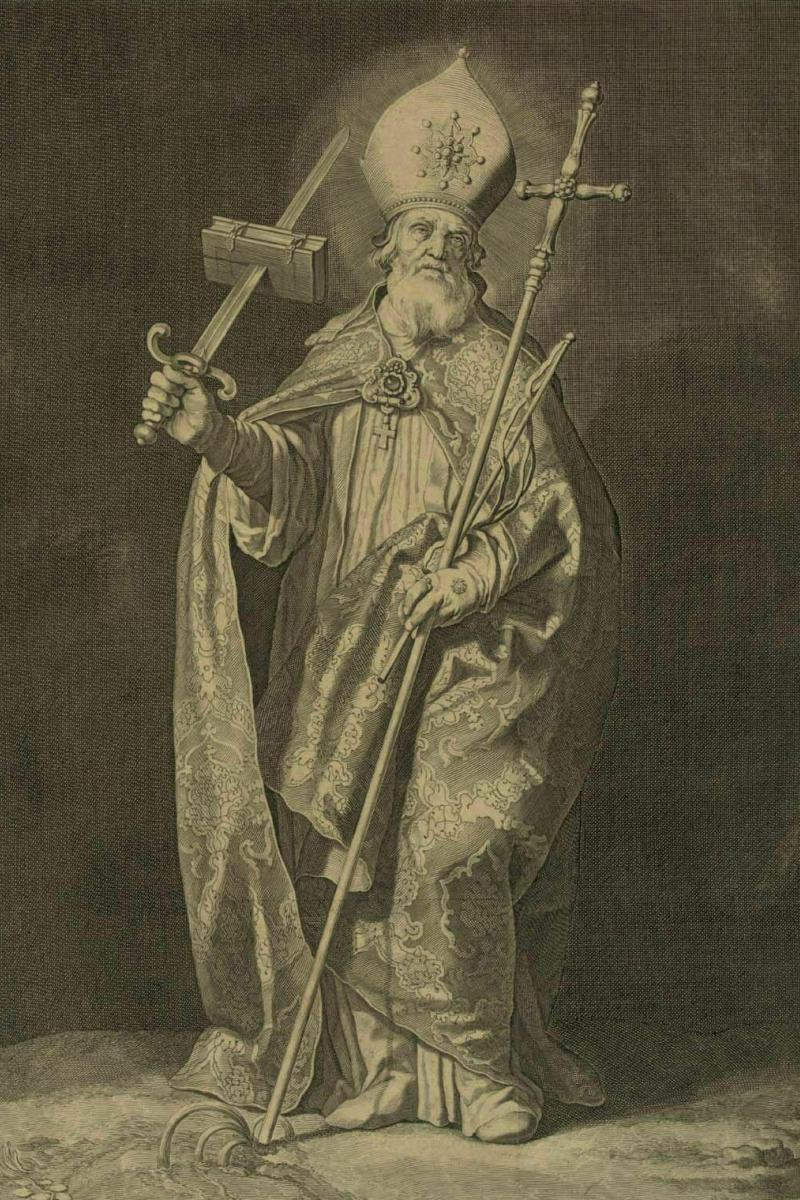
Hieromartyr Boniface, Archbishop of Mainz and Enlightener of Germany.

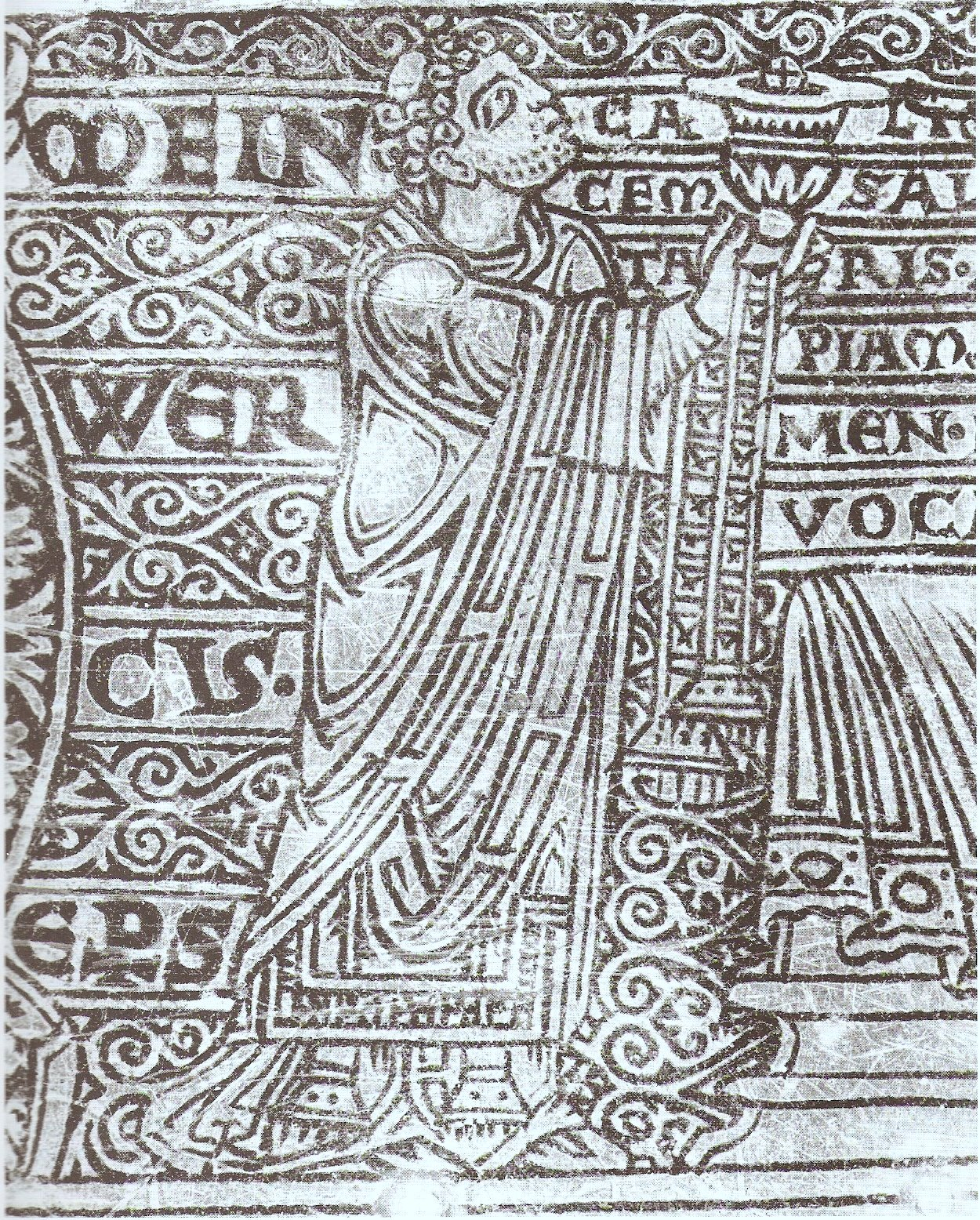
St. Meinwerk, Bishop of Paderborn.

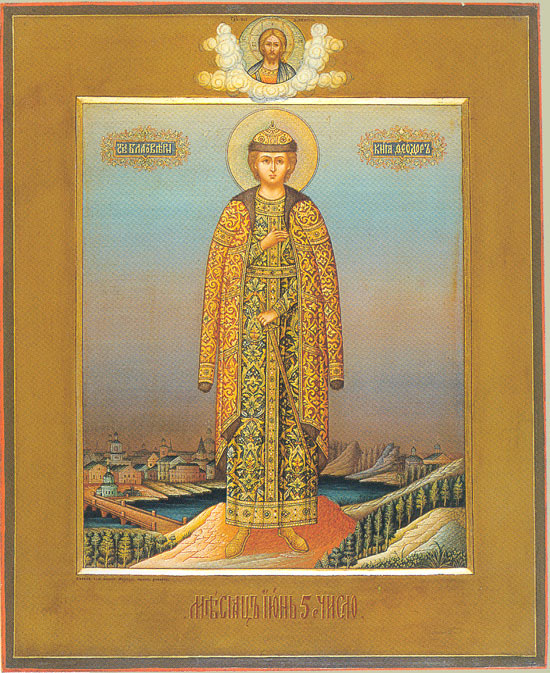
St. Theodore Yaroslavich of Novgorod.

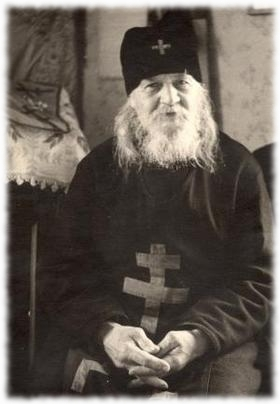
Venerable John of Valamo.

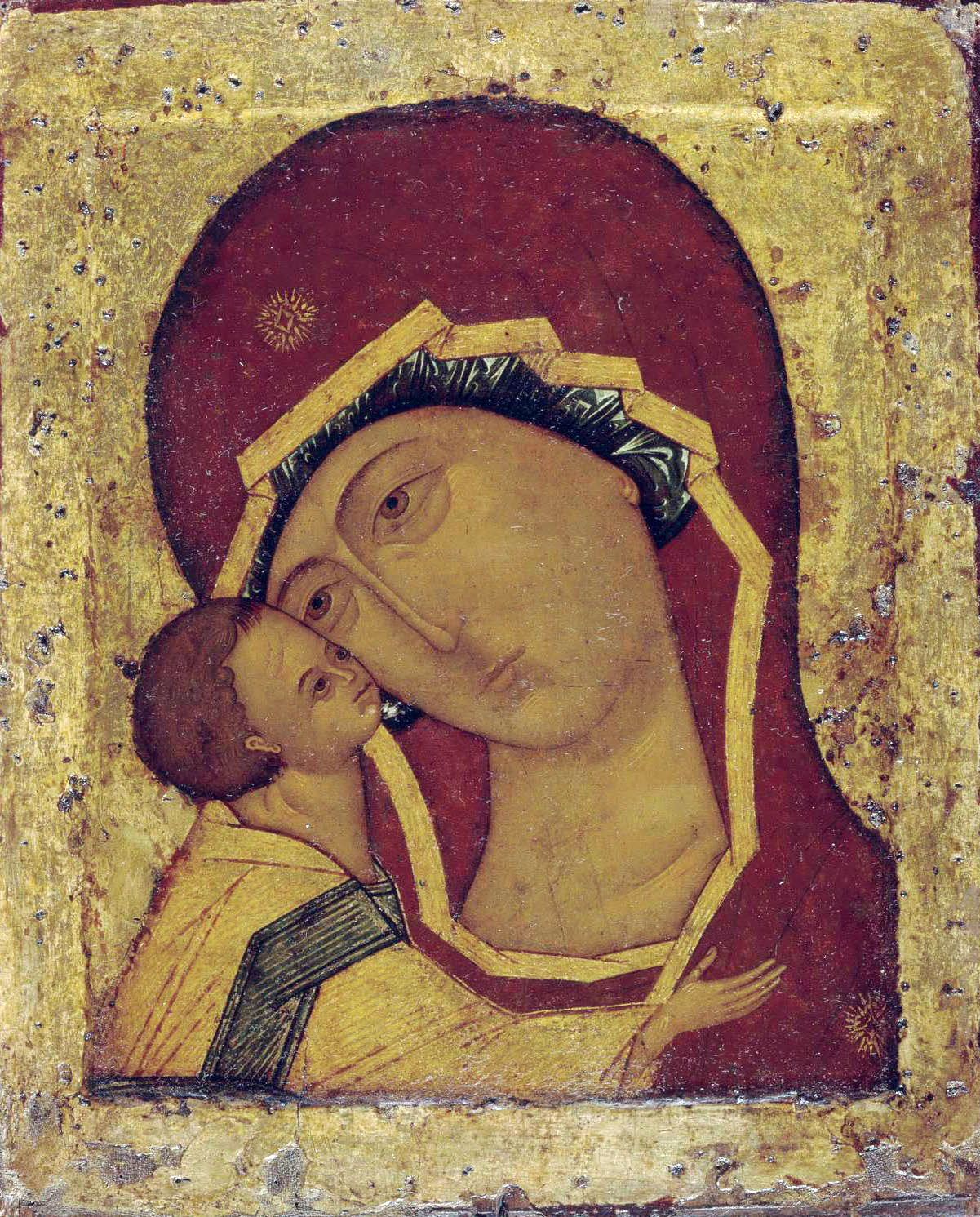
Icon of the Mother of God of Igor.

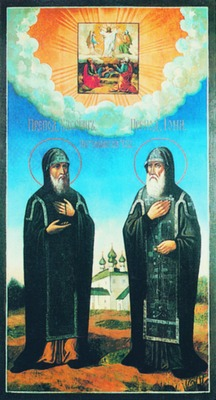
Sts. Jonah and Bassian, monks, of Pertoma and Solovki.

== Sources ==
- June 5/18. Orthodox Calendar (PRAVOSLAVIE.RU).
- June 18 / June 5. HOLY TRINITY RUSSIAN ORTHODOX CHURCH (A parish of the Patriarchate of Moscow).
- June 5. OCA - The Lives of the Saints.
- The Autonomous Orthodox Metropolia of Western Europe and the Americas (ROCOR). St. Hilarion Calendar of Saints for the year of our Lord 2004. St. Hilarion Press (Austin, TX). p. 41.
- The Fifth Day of the Month of June. Orthodoxy in China.
- June 5. Latin Saints of the Orthodox Patriarchate of Rome.
- The Roman Martyrology. Transl. by the Archbishop of Baltimore. Last Edition, According to the Copy Printed at Rome in 1914. Revised Edition, with the Imprimatur of His Eminence Cardinal Gibbons. Baltimore: John Murphy Company, 1916. pp. 164–165.
- Rev. Richard Stanton. A Menology of England and Wales, or, Brief Memorials of the Ancient British and English Saints Arranged According to the Calendar, Together with the Martyrs of the 16th and 17th Centuries. London: Burns & Oates, 1892. pp. 255–258.

Greek Sources

- Great Synaxaristes: (in Greek) 5 ΙΟΥΝΙΟΥ. ΜΕΓΑΣ ΣΥΝΑΞΑΡΙΣΤΗΣ.
- (in Greek) Συναξαριστής. 5 Ιουνίου. ECCLESIA.GR. (H ΕΚΚΛΗΣΙΑ ΤΗΣ ΕΛΛΑΔΟΣ).
- (in Greek) 05/06/2017. Ορθόδοξος Συναξαριστής.

Russian Sources

- (in Russian) 18 июня (5 июня). Православная Энциклопедия под редакцией Патриарха Московского и всея Руси Кирилла (электронная версия). (Orthodox Encyclopedia - Pravenc.ru).
- (in Russian) 5 июня по старому стилю / 18 июня по новому стилю. Русская Православная Церковь - Православный церковный календарь на 2016 год.
- (in Russian) 5 июня (ст.ст.) 18 июня 2014 (нов. ст.). Русская Православная Церковь Отдел внешних церковных связей. (DECR).
