= June 4 (Eastern Orthodox liturgics) =

Day in the Eastern Orthodox liturgical calendar

Eastern Orthodox liturgical calendar
June 3	June 4	June 5
June 4 O.S. ≍ June 17 N.S. June 4 N.S ≍ May 22 O.S.

An Eastern Orthodox cross

June 4 in Eastern Orthodox liturgical calendars is a feast day and a day of commemoration of saints and martyrs. Although some Orthodox churches use the Revised Julian Calendar and others use the traditional Julian calendar, the fixed commemorations for their respective June 4 are broadly the same, no matter which calendar is used. (Note: Despite the dates being the same, the days to which they refer typically differ by 13 days. The notation Old Style or O.S. is sometimes used to indicate a date in the traditional Julian Calendar (the "Old Calendar"). The notation New Style or N.S. indicates a date in the Revised Julian calendar (the "New Calendar").)

== Saints ==
- Saints Mary and Martha of Bethany, sisters of Saint Lazarus (1st century) (Note: Name days celebrated today include: Martha (Μάρθα).)
- Hieromartyr Astius, Bishop of Dyrrachium in Macedonia (2nd century)
- Saint Titus, Bishop of Byzantium (3rd century)
- Holy Martyrs of Niculitsel, Romania (320): (Note: Their relics were uncovered in 1971, near the village of Nicolitsel (Niculițel), in the region of Tulcea, Romania.)

- Hieromartyr Apotacius and Martyrs Zoticus, Atallus, Camasius, Philip, and 31 others, including:
- Eutychius, Quirinus, Julia, Saturninus, Ninita, Fortunio, Gaddanus, and Amasus, beheaded at Noviodunum (Niculitel), in Scythia Minor

- Saint Metrophanes of Byzantium, first Archbishop of Constantinople (c. 326) (Note: "At Constantinople, St. Metrophanes, bishop and renowned confessor.")
- Venerable Alonius of Scetis in Egypt (5th century)
- Saint Zosimas of Cilicia, Bishop of Babylon in Egypt (6th century)
- Venerable Martyr John, Abbot of Monagria Monastery, near Cyzicus (761) (Note: According to Saint Nicodemus the Hagiorite, the venerable monk-martyr John was the hegumen of the monastery of Monagria in Cyprus. He was martyred after they tied him in a sack and threw him into the sea.)
- Venerable Sophia of Ainos, Thrace, Mother of Orphans (10th-11th centuries)

== Pre-Schism Western saints ==
- Saint Clateus, one of the earliest Bishops of Brescia in Italy, martyred under Nero (c. 64)
- Martyrs Frontasius, Severinus, Severian, and Silanus, of Gaul (1st century)
- Martyr Concordius of Spoleto (c. 175)
- Martyrs Aretius (Arecius, Aregius) and Dacian, in Rome (Note: Roman martyrs who were buried in the catacombs on the Appian Way.)
- Saint Saturnina, a virgin-martyr from Germany murdered near Arras in France
- Saint Quirinus, a martyr in Tivoli near Rome
- Saint Quirinus of Sescia, Bishop of Siscia (Sisak or Seseg), now in Croatia (308) (Note: Having fled to escape the persecution of Galerius, he was captured and ordered to sacrifice to the gods. He refused, was barbarously beaten and handed over to the governor of Pannonia Prima at Sabaria, now Szombathely, in Hungary. There, on his continued refusal to apostatise, he was drowned in the River Raab.) (Note: "At Sisseck, in Illyria, in the time of the governor Galerius, St. Quirinus, bishop. Prudentius relates that for the faith of Christ he was precipitated into a river, with a milltsone tied to his neck; but as the stone floated on the water, he exhorted for a long time the Christians who were present not to be terrified by his punishment, nor to waver in the faith, and then God heard his prayers to be drowned, that he might attain to the glory of martyrdom.")
- Saint Rutilus and Companions, martyrs at Sabaria (Sabar) in Pannonia, now Hungary
- Saint Optatus, Bishop of Milevum in Numidia (376) (Note: Bishop of Milevis in Numidia in North Africa. He opposed Donatism, writing six treatises against them which were praised by his contemporaries.) (Note: "S. Optatus was an African, and was educated as an idolater, but was converted to Christianity, and became bishop of Milevis in Numidia. He is chiefly known by his books against the Donatists, which is a principal source of information concerning these schismatics in the early portion of their history.")
- Venerable Nennocha (Ninnoca, Nennoc, Gwengustle), a holy virgin from Britain who followed Saint Germanus to France, becoming an abbess in Brittany at Ploërmel or Pleumeur-Gautier (c. 467) (Note: Many miracles are ascribed to her in her legend in the Monastery of the Cross of Quimperle in the Diocese of Quimper in Brittany.) (Note: "ST. NlNNOC was the youngest of the many children of Brecan, Prince of Brecknock, and the sister of many Saints. Her pious parents, though not without reluctance, consented to her choice of a solitary life, which she is supposed to have begun at an early age in Cornwall. Afterwards, however, she removed, with a company of priests and devout persons of both sexes, into Brittany, and settled on the coast in the province of Cornouailles. Ninnoc was well received by the prince of the country, who allowed her to found a monastery, and afterwards made provision for its maintenance. She is said to have lived in this spot during thirty-eight years in all the rigorous practices of the religious life, growing in sanctity and accumulating merits, till she was admitted to joys of the heavenly paradise. The reputation of holiness which she left behind was not confined to Brittany, but spread into other lands; and we find that she is invoked in the ancient English Litanies attributed to the seventh century.") (Note: "[Venerated in Brittany (invoked in a Breton Litany of the 10th cent.). Authority: — The Acts preserved at Quimper, which are, however, fabulous. They were written in the 13th cent, from oral traditions, and are full of anachronisms, and the Bollandists do not publish them in their entirety. As specimens of the anachronisms we may adduce these. S. Columba (d. 597) is said to have baptized S. Nennocha — two hundred years before she was born! Her mother, Moneduc, is said to have been the daughter of Constantine, king of Cornwall and Devon, who died A.D. 576 (see March 11), and he is said to have been descended from Julius Caesar. And S. Germain of Auxerre (d. 448) is made contemporary with S. Turiau, B. of Dol, in the 8th cent., and is sent from Ireland by S. Patrick (d. 465) to Britain. But the Acts, it is very evident, are made out of popular Breton ballads. In one place the writer translates into metre the reply of Moneduc to her daughter.]" "The legend of S. Nennocha is pure fable, through which one can scarce discern the outlines of history. According to the legend there was a king in Wales named Breochan, who with his wife Moneduc had fourteen sons, who all deserted him that they might preach the Gospel. Breochan then promised he would yield tithe of all his gold and lands if God would give him another child. In course of time Moneduc brought forth a little girl, who was baptized by the name of Nennocha-Guengustl, and was then given to be fostered by Gurhentil, a kinsman of the king, and his wife Guenargant. At the age fourteen Nenocha returned to her father's house, and was sought in marriage by a prince of Ireland. But S. Germain being then at her father's palace, he persuaded her to embrace the religious life. Breochan sadly gave his consent. Then, the news having spread abroad, a great multitude assembled to accompany S. Nennocha in her renunciation of the world. Among these were four bishops, a crowd of priests and virgins. They all took ship together and sailed to Brittany, and landed at Pullilfyn. The king of the country gave S. Nennocha land at Ploërmel, and there she founded a great monastery where she resided till her death.")
- Venerable Breaca, a disciple of Saint Brigid who crossed from Ireland to Cornwall (c. 460) with several companions (5th-6th centuries) (Note: [Anciently venerated on this day in the diocese of Exeter. Authority: — The Ancient Exeter Martyrology of B. Grandison, quoted by Leland.] This saint is said, but it is more than questionable, to have been a disciple of S. Patrick. She came to Cornwall from Ireland, and lived a solitary life on the east bank of the river Hayle.")
- Venerable Petroc (Petrock, Pedrog, Perreux), Abbot in Cornwall (c. 594) (Note: Born in Wales, he studied in Ireland and settled in Cornwall, where he was very active. He founded a monastery at a place called after him, Petrocstow (Padstow), and another at Bodmin where he reposed.)
- Saints Croidan, Medan and Degan, three disciples of Saint Petroc in Cornwall (6th century)
- Saint Buriana, born in Ireland, she lived as an anchoress in Cornwall (6th century) (Note: St Buryan is named after her.)
- Saint Eadfrith of Lindisfarne (Edfrith), Bishop of Lindisfarne in England after Saint Edbert, he illuminated the Lindisfarne Gospels in honour of Saint Cuthbert (721)
- Saint Alexander, Bishop of Verona in Italy (8th century)
- Saint Aldegrin (Adalgrin), a noble who became a monk near Cluny in France (939)
- Saint Elsiar, a monk at Saint-Savin Abbey in Lavedan in France (c. 1050)

== Post-Schism Orthodox saints ==
- Saint Martirius, Archbishop of Novgorod (1199)
- Saint Metrophanes of Radonezh, elder and abbot (14th century)
- Venerable Methodius, founder of Peshnosha Monastery, Moscow, disciple of Saint Sergius of Radonezh (1392) (Note: See: (in Russian) Мефодий Пешношский. Википе́дия. (Russian Wikipedia).)
- Saints Eleazar and Nazarius, Wonderworkers of Olonets (15th century) (Note: They are also commemorated on the Synaxis of the Saints of Novgorod, on the fourth Sunday after Pentecost.)

=== New martyrs and confessors ===
- New Hieromartyr Andronik (Andronicus) Nikolsky, Archbishop of Perm (1918)
- New Hieromartyr Peter Belyaev, Priest (1918)
- New Hieromartyr Đorđe Bogić, Serbian Orthodox Protopresbyter in Našice, killed by the Ustashas (1941)
- New Hieromartyr Joanikije (Ioannicius) Lipovac, Metropolitan of Montenegro and the Littoral (1945) (see also: June 18)

== Other commemorations ==
- Repose of Hieromonk Bartholomew of Neamts and Svir (1864)
- Repose of the righteous sisters Vera (June 4) and Lyubov (June 8), foundresses of the Shamordino Convent (1883)
- Uncovering of the relics (1999) of New Hieromartyr Peter (Zverev), Archbishop of Voronezh and Zadonsk (1929) (Note: See: (in Russian) Пётр (Зверев). Википе́дия. (Russian Wikipedia).)

== Icon gallery ==
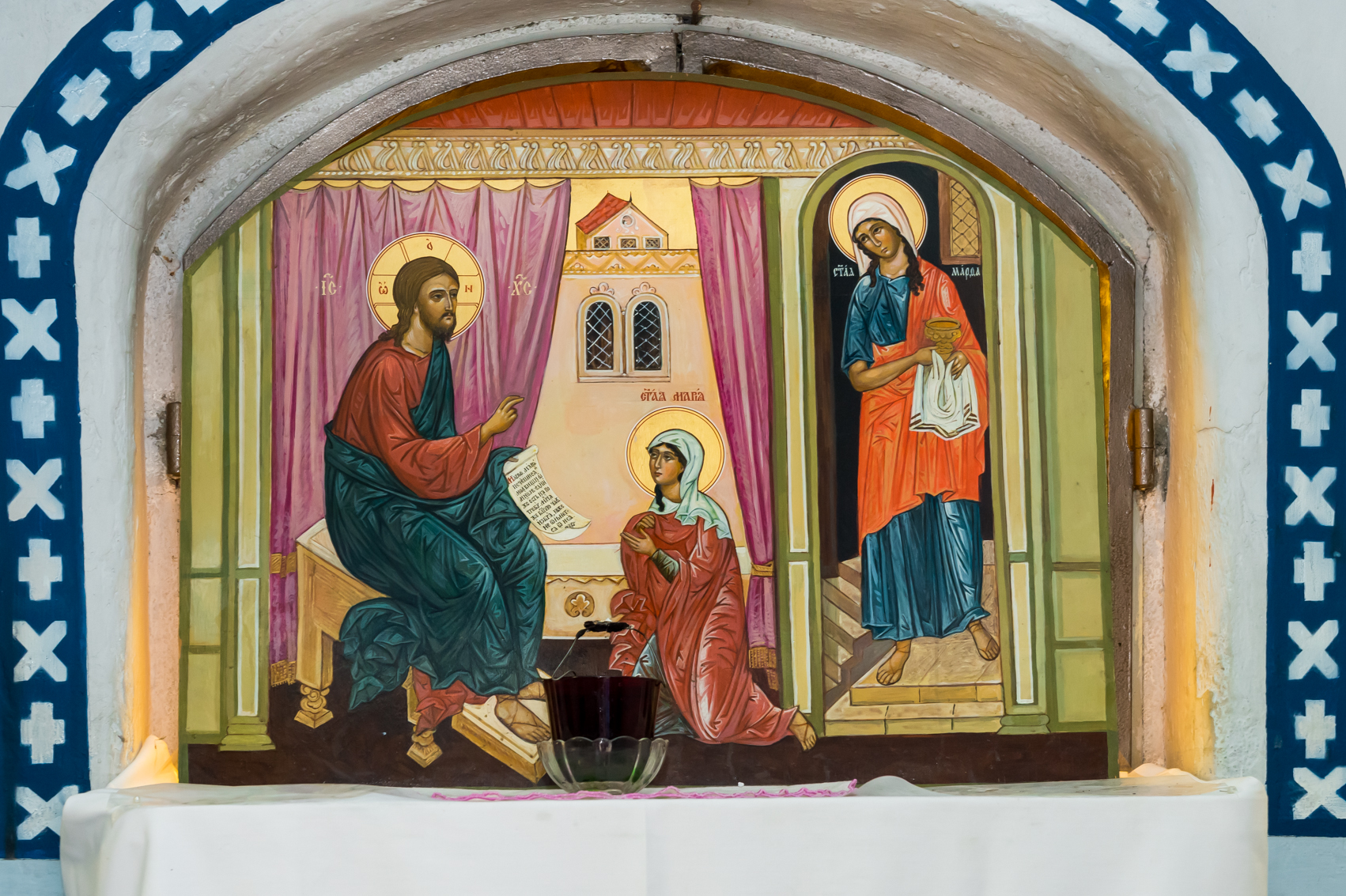
Saints Mary and Martha, sisters of St. Lazarus

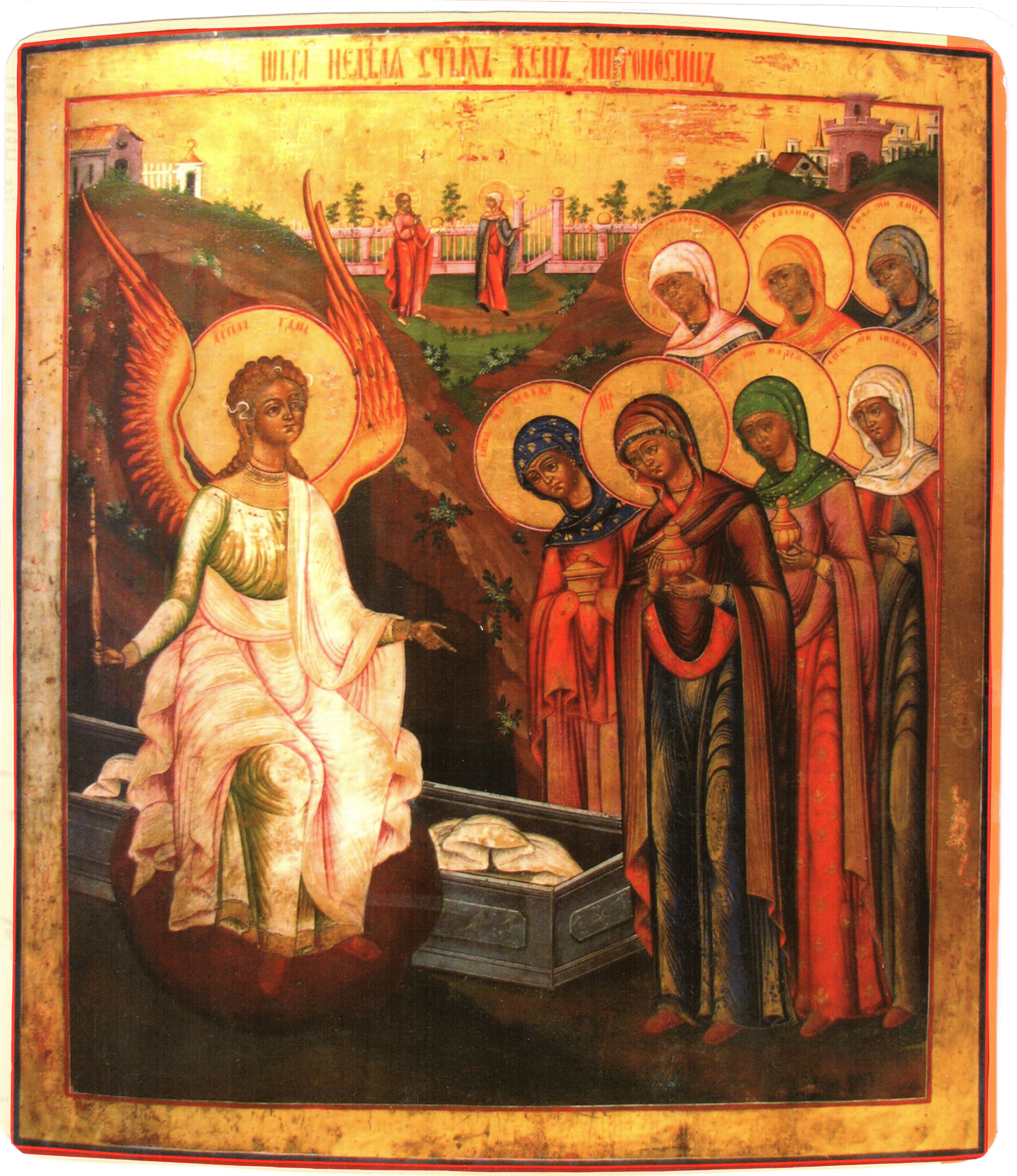
Myrrh-Bearing women, including saints Mary and Martha.

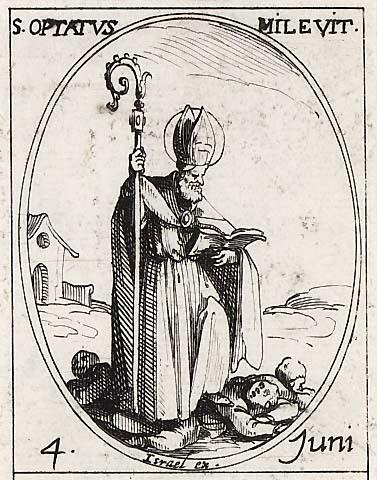
St. Optatus, Bishop of Milevum in Numidia.

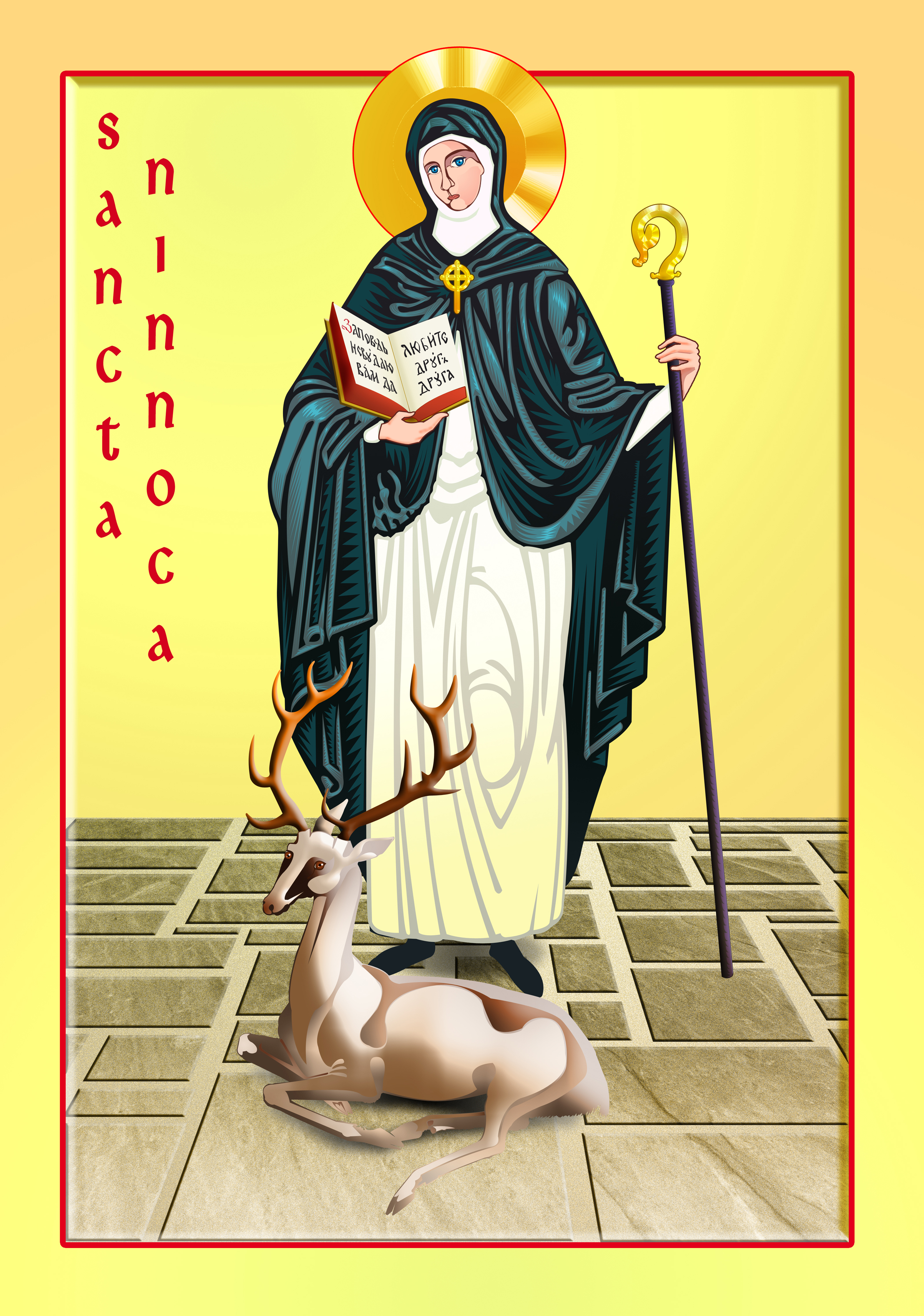
Venerable Nennocha (Nennoc, Ninnoc).

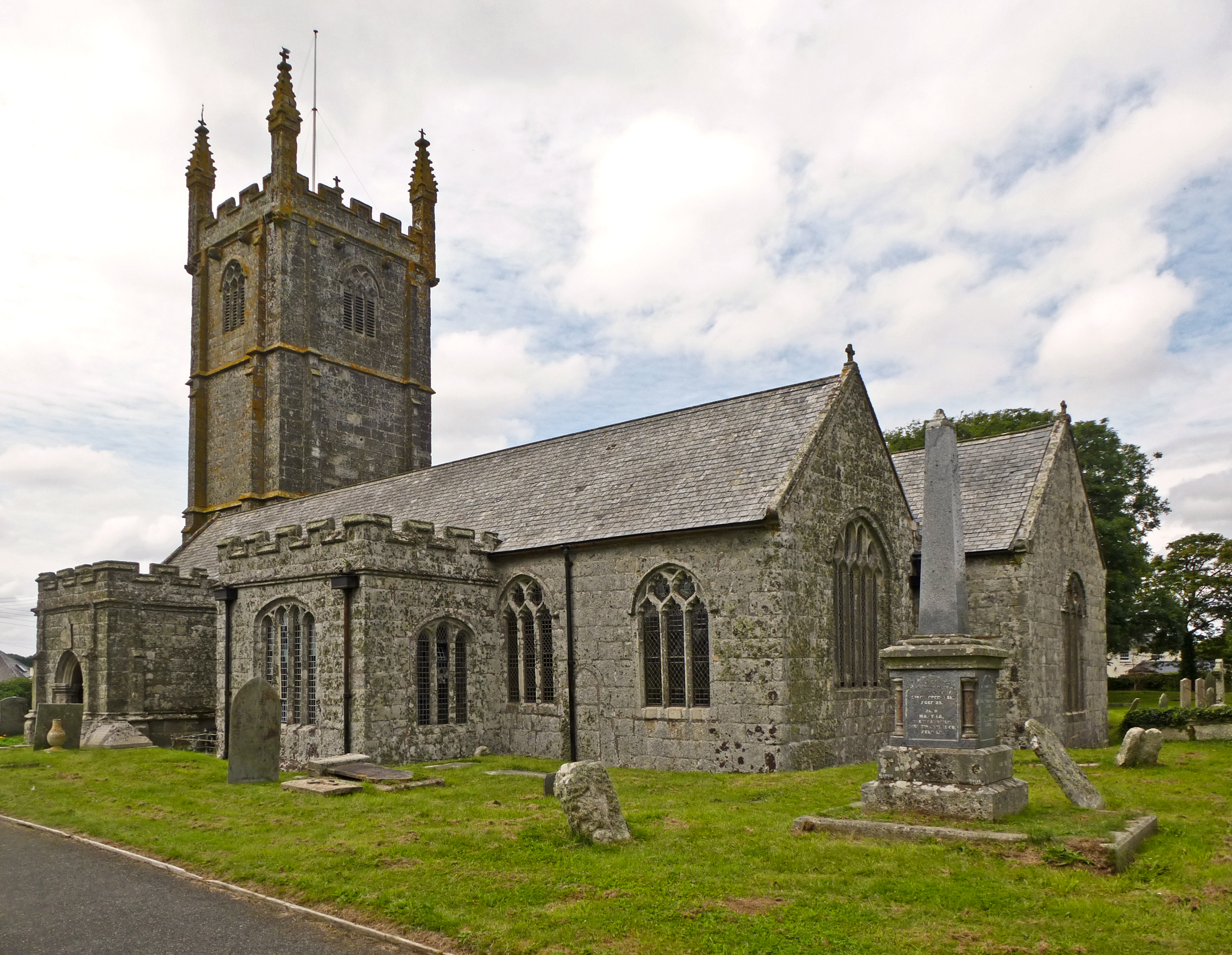
St Breage's Church, Breage.

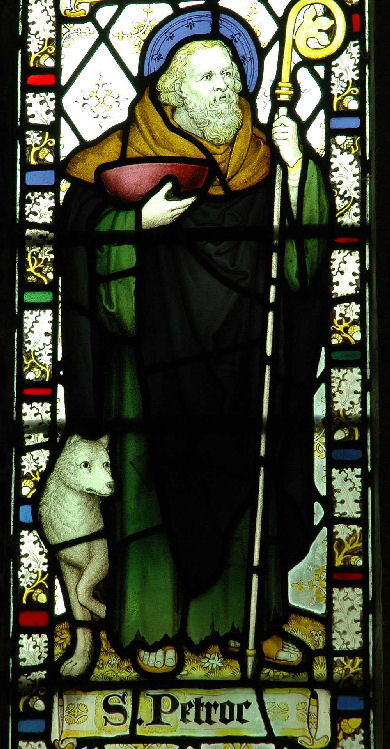
Venerable Petroc, Abbot in Cornwall.

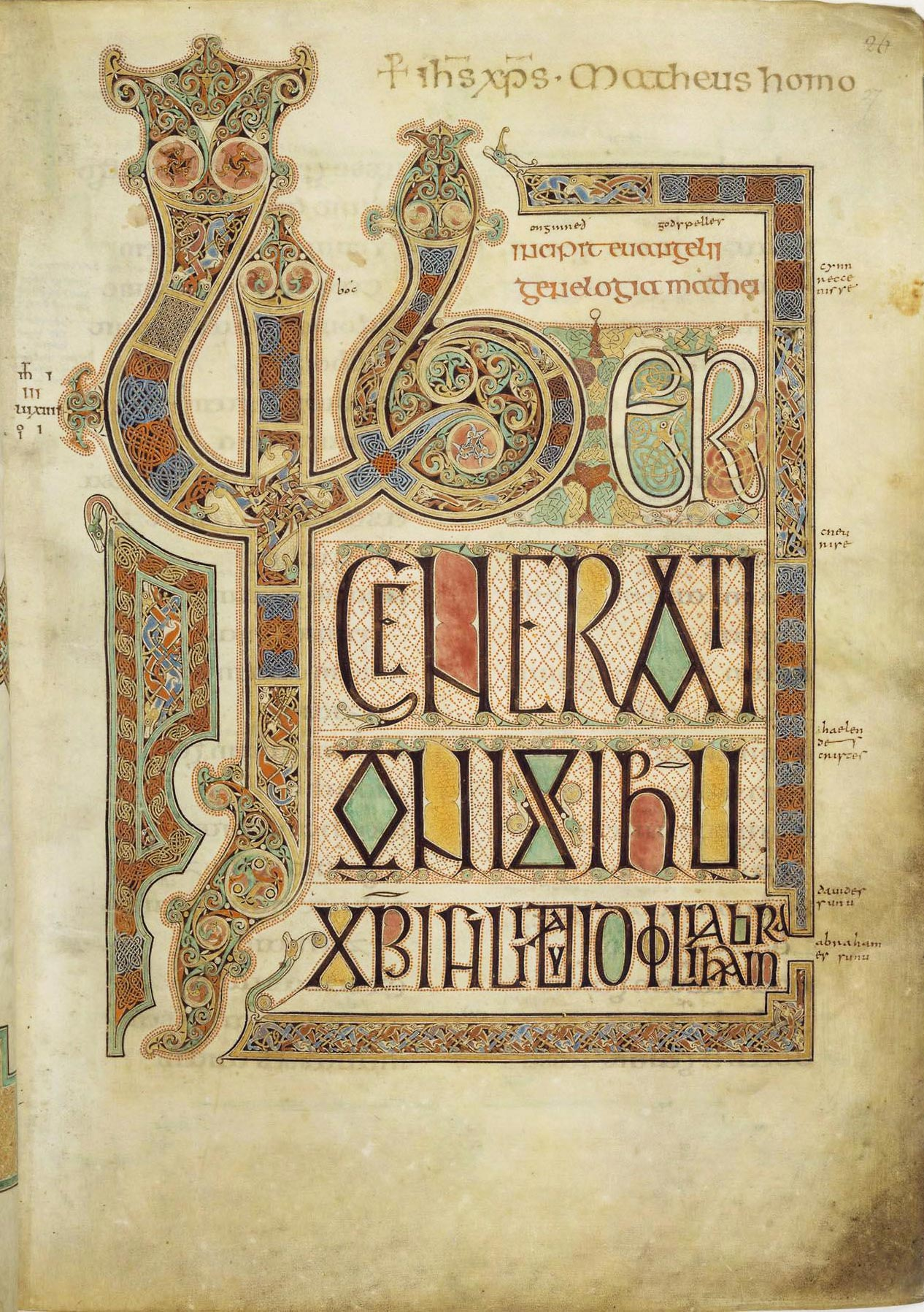
Incipit of the Gospel of Matthew from the Lindisfarne Gospels, an illuminated manuscript said to have been created by Eadfrith.

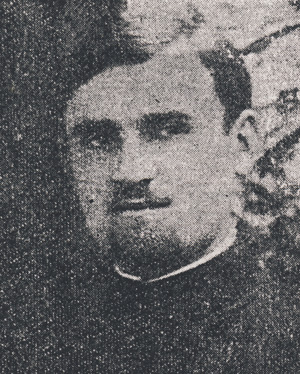
New Hieromartyr Đorđe Bogić, protopresbyter, killed by Ustashas.

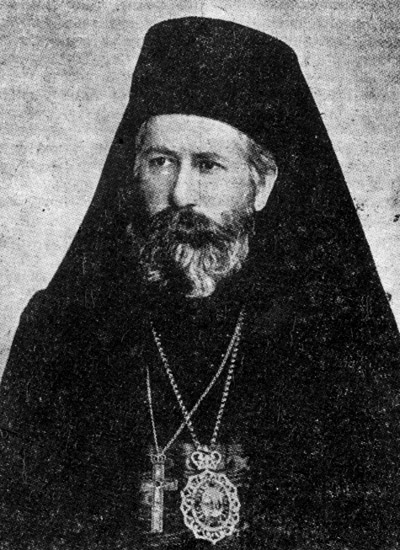
New Hieromartyr Ioannicius (Lipovac), Metropolitan of Montenegro and the Littoral.

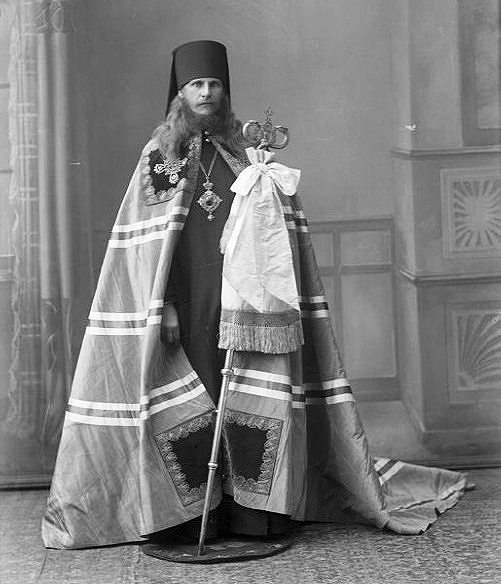
New Hieromartyr Peter (Zverev), Archbishop of Voronezh and Zadonsk.

== Sources ==
- June 4/17. Orthodox Calendar (PRAVOSLAVIE.RU).
- June 17 / June 4. HOLY TRINITY RUSSIAN ORTHODOX CHURCH (A parish of the Patriarchate of Moscow).
- June 4. OCA - The Lives of the Saints.
- The Autonomous Orthodox Metropolia of Western Europe and the Americas (ROCOR). St. Hilarion Calendar of Saints for the year of our Lord 2004. St. Hilarion Press (Austin, TX). p. 41.
- The Fourth Day of the Month of June. Orthodoxy in China.
- June 4. Latin Saints of the Orthodox Patriarchate of Rome.
- The Roman Martyrology. Transl. by the Archbishop of Baltimore. Last Edition, According to the Copy Printed at Rome in 1914. Revised Edition, with the Imprimatur of His Eminence Cardinal Gibbons. Baltimore: John Murphy Company, 1916. pp. 163–164.
- Rev. Richard Stanton. A Menology of England and Wales, or, Brief Memorials of the Ancient British and English Saints Arranged According to the Calendar, Together with the Martyrs of the 16th and 17th Centuries. London: Burns & Oates, 1892. pp. 253–255.

Greek Sources

- Great Synaxaristes: (in Greek) 4 ΙΟΥΝΙΟΥ. ΜΕΓΑΣ ΣΥΝΑΞΑΡΙΣΤΗΣ.
- (in Greek) Συναξαριστής. 4 Ιουνίου. ECCLESIA.GR. (H ΕΚΚΛΗΣΙΑ ΤΗΣ ΕΛΛΑΔΟΣ).
- (in Greek) June 4. Ορθόδοξος Συναξαριστής.

Russian Sources

- (in Russian) 17 июня (4 июня). Православная Энциклопедия под редакцией Патриарха Московского и всея Руси Кирилла (электронная версия). (Orthodox Encyclopedia - Pravenc.ru).
- (in Russian) 4 июня по старому стилю / 17 июня по новому стилю. Русская Православная Церковь - Православный церковный календарь на 2016 год.
- (in Russian) 4 июня (ст.ст.) 17 июня 2014 (нов. ст.). Русская Православная Церковь Отдел внешних церковных связей. (DECR).
