= Monaster =

The name Monaster (one star) can refer to:

- Monaster, a genus of prehistoric starfish
- Monaster, an alternate name for Niculițel, a small Romanian commune
