= June 6 (Eastern Orthodox liturgics) =

Day in the Eastern Orthodox liturgical calendar

Eastern Orthodox liturgical calendar
June 5	June 6	June 7
June 6 O.S. ≍ June 19 N.S. June 6 N.S ≍ May 24 O.S.

An Eastern Orthodox cross

June 6 in Eastern Orthodox liturgical calendars is a feast day and a day of commemoration of saints and martyrs. Although some Orthodox churches use the Revised Julian Calendar and others use the traditional Julian calendar, the fixed commemorations for their respective June 6 are broadly the same, no matter which calendar is used. (Note: Despite the dates being the same, the days to which they refer typically differ by 13 days. The notation Old Style or O.S. is sometimes used to indicate a date in the traditional Julian Calendar (the "Old Calendar"). The notation New Style or N.S. indicates a date in the Revised Julian calendar (the "New Calendar").)

== Saints ==
- Saint Justus, Bishop of Alexandria (130)
- Virgin-martyrs Archelais, Thecla, and Susanna, beheaded at Salerno (293) (see also: January 18 - West)
- Five Virgin-martyrs:

- Valeria, Kyria, Martha, Mary and Marcia, of Caesarea in Palaestina, martyred for refusing to sacrifice to idols. (see also: June 7)

- Martyr Gelasius, by beheading.
- Martyrs Amandus, Amantius, Alexander, Lucius, Alexander, Alexandria, Avdaldus, Donatus, and Peregrinus at Noviodunum (Niculitel) (320)
- Venerable Amon (or Anoub), the Standard-bearer, renowned ascetic of the Egyptian desert at Raithu (4th century)
- Venerable Bessarion the Great, Wonderworker of Egypt (4th-5th century)
- Venerable Hilarion the New, Abbot of the Dalmatian Monastery at Constantinople (845)
- Venerable Attalus the Wonderworker.
- Venerable Photius, monk.

== Pre-Schism Western saints ==
- Saint Romulus of Fiesole, a disciple of the Apostle Peter, martyred in Florence under Domitian (c. 81-96)
- Martyrs Artemius, Candida and Paulina, at Rome (302) (Note: Artemius, a jailer in one of the Roman prisons, with his wife Candida and daughter Paulina, was converted to Christ by St Peter the exorcist and baptised by St Marcellinus. Artemius was beheaded and his wife and daughter buried alive under a pile of stones.) (Note: "At Rome, St. Artemius, with his wife Candida and his daughter Paulina. Artemius became a believer through the preaching and miracles of St. Peter the Exorcist, who was baptized with all his house by the priest St. Marcellinus. By order of the judge Serenus, he was scourged with whips strung with leaden balls, and struck with the sword. His wife and daughter were forced into a pit and overwhelmed with stones and earth.")
- Saint Vincent of Bevagna, first Bishop of Bevagna in Umbria in Italy, martyred under Diocletian (303)
- Martyrs Amantius, Alexander and Companions, at Noyon in France. (Note: "At Noyon, in France, the holy martyrs Amatius, Alexander, and their companions.")
- Saint Ceratius (Cérase), Bishop of Grenoble in France (c. 455) (Note: See: (in French) Cérat de Grenoble. Wikipédia. (French Wikipedia).)
- Saint Eustorgius II, Bishop of Milan in Italy, Confessor (518) (Note: He became Bishop of Milan in Italy in 512 and spent large amounts of money paying the ransoms of many of his flock who had been taken prisoner by barbarians.)
- Saint Jarlath (Iarlaithe mac Loga), first Bishop of Tuam, founder of the monastery of Cluain Fois, Ireland (c. 540) (Note: First Bishop of Tuam in Connaught in Ireland, where he established a monastery of which St Brendan of Clonard and St Colman of Cloyne were monks.)
- Saint Alexander, Martyr-Bishop of Fiesole in Italy (590) (Note: He was a brave defender of the Church against the Kings of Lombardy. His opponents waylaid him and drowned him in the River Reno near Bologna.)
- Saint Gudwal (Curval), Welsh Bishop and Confessor and Abbot of 188 monks (6th century) (Note: A bishop from Wales who founded monasteries in Devon and Cornwall. By many he is said to be the Gurval who succeeded St Malo at Aleth in Brittany. His relics are venerated in Ghent in Belgium.) (Note: [Venerated In the diocese of S. Malo. Gallican Martyrologies. Authority:—Life in the Lessons of the S. Malo Breviary.] S. Gurwall was born in Britain, and is said — but this is questionable — to have been for some time a disciple of S. Brendan in Ireland, and to have succeeded him as abbot. Thence he went into Brittany, and became known to S. Malo, bishop of Aleth, who designated him as his successor. But, after holding the see a year and a few months, he wearied of his charge, and having appointed Colfineth, his archdeacon, to succeed him, retired with some of his clergy to the monastery of Gurn, which he had built; but not finding there the solitude he desired, he spent the rest of his days in a cavern above the sea.")
- Saint Cocca (Cucca, Cuach), patron-saint of Kilcock on the borders of Cos. Meath and Kildare in Ireland.
- Saint Claudius of Besançon (Claude), Gaul (699) (Note: Born in Franche-Comté, in France, he became a priest and monk and then Abbot of Condat in the Jura mountains. In 685 he became Bishop of Besançon. After his repose his monastery became known as Saint-Claude.)
- Saint John of Verona, the successor of St Maurus in Verona in Italy (7th century)

== Post-Schism Orthodox saints ==
- Saint Jonah, Bishop of Perm (1470) (Note: See: (in Russian) Иона (епископ Пермский). Википе́дия. (Russian Wikipedia).) (see also: January 29 )
- Saint Paisius of Uglich, Abbot (1504) (Note: See: (in Russian) Паисий Угличский. Википе́дия. (Russian Wikipedia).)
- Saint Jonah of Klimetzk, founder of Klimets Monastery, Olonets (1534) (Note: See: (in Russian) Иона Клименецкий. Википе́дия. (Russian Wikipedia).)

=== New martyrs and confessors ===
- New Hiero-confessor Raphael (Sheichenko), Hieromonk of Optina Monastery (1957)

== Other commemorations ==
- Uncovering of the relics of Venerable Barlaam of Khutyn, founder of Khutyn Monastery, Novgorod (c. 1452), (see also: November 6 )
- Commemoration of the miracle of Archangel Michael, at Alexandria.
- Icon of the Mother of God of Pimen (1381 or 1387) (Note: This icon was brought to Moscow from Constantinople in 1381 by Metropolitan Pimen.)
- Uncovering of the relics of blessed martyr Basil of Mangazea (1602) (Note: (in Russian) "Сначала днем памяти святого было 22 марта, когда святая Церковь вспоминала соименного ему священномученика Василия Анкирского. В последующее время память блаженного Василия стала совершаться и 10 мая — в память о перенесении его мощей из Мангазеи. Ранее память святому совершалась в монастыре еще и 6 июня, день явления его мощей (по другим источникам, кончина св. Мученика Василия Мангазейского приходится на 4 апреля 1602 года).) (see also: March 22 - Feast; and May 10 - Translation of Relics )
- Repose of Eldress Raisa of Serafimovich village near Volgograd (1957)
- Repose of Schemanun Macaria of Temkino in the Smolensk region (1993)

== Icon gallery ==
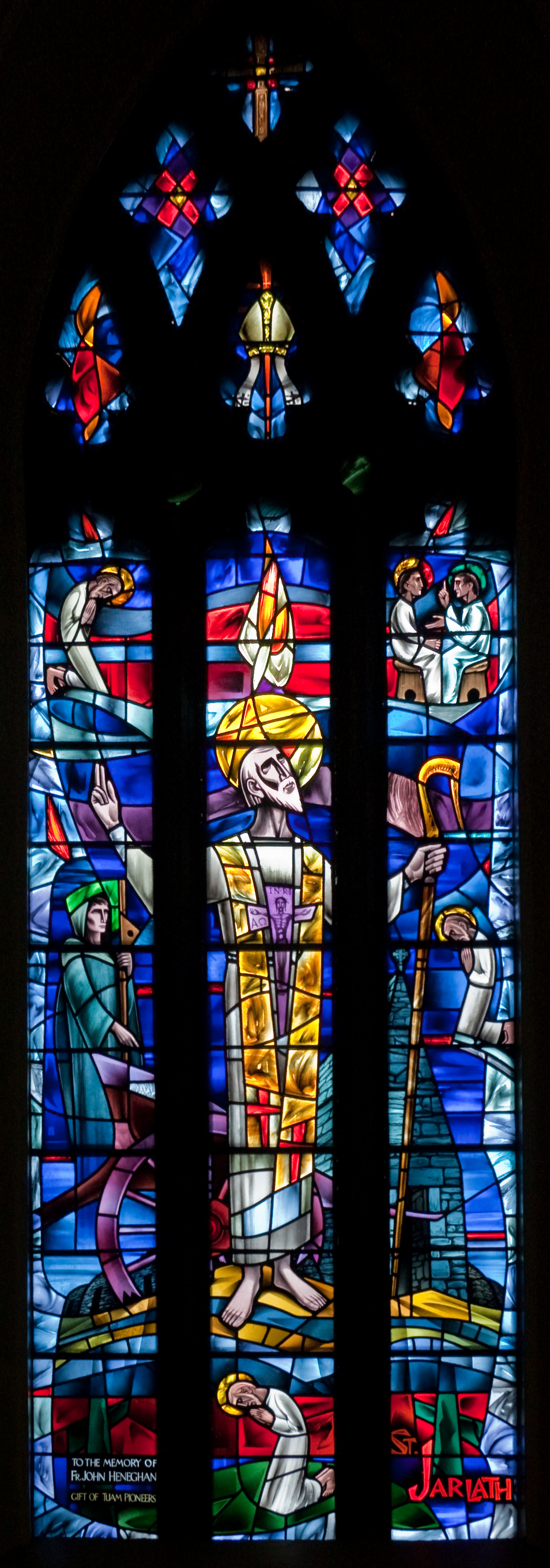
St. Jarlath (Iarlaithe mac Loga), first Bishop of Tuam.

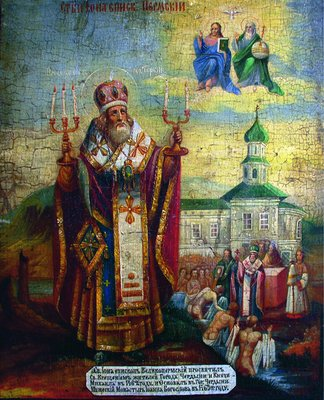
St. Jonah, Bishop of Perm

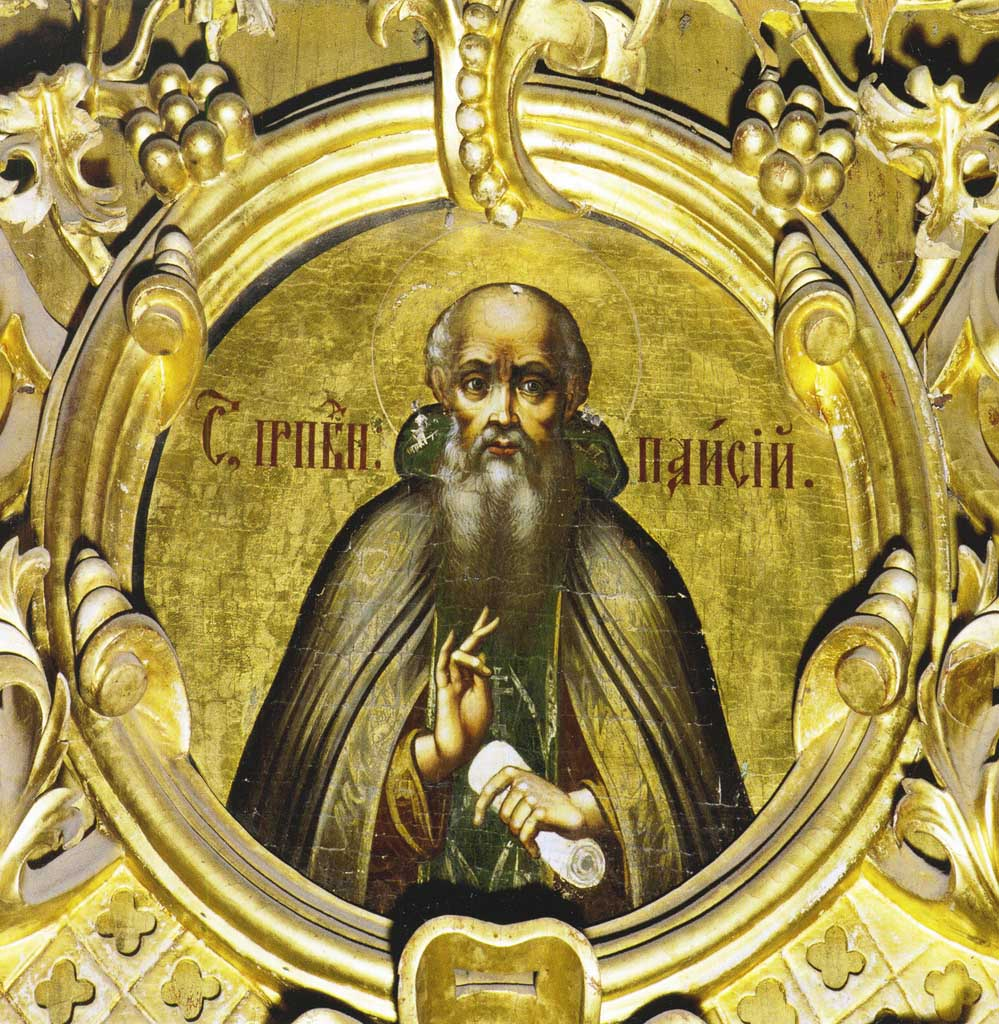
St. Paisius of Uglich, Abbot.

== Sources ==
- June 6/19. Orthodox Calendar (PRAVOSLAVIE.RU).
- June 19 / June 6. HOLY TRINITY RUSSIAN ORTHODOX CHURCH (A parish of the Patriarchate of Moscow).
- June 6. OCA - The Lives of the Saints.
- The Autonomous Orthodox Metropolia of Western Europe and the Americas (ROCOR). St. Hilarion Calendar of Saints for the year of our Lord 2004. St. Hilarion Press (Austin, TX). p. 42.
- The Sixth Day of the Month of June. Orthodoxy in China.
- June 6. Latin Saints of the Orthodox Patriarchate of Rome.
- The Roman Martyrology. Transl. by the Archbishop of Baltimore. Last Edition, According to the Copy Printed at Rome in 1914. Revised Edition, with the Imprimatur of His Eminence Cardinal Gibbons. Baltimore: John Murphy Company, 1916. pp. 165–166.
- Rev. Richard Stanton. A Menology of England and Wales, or, Brief Memorials of the Ancient British and English Saints Arranged According to the Calendar, Together with the Martyrs of the 16th and 17th Centuries. London: Burns & Oates, 1892. pp. 258–259.

Greek Sources

- Great Synaxaristes: (in Greek) 6 ΙΟΥΝΙΟΥ. ΜΕΓΑΣ ΣΥΝΑΞΑΡΙΣΤΗΣ.
- (in Greek) Συναξαριστής. 6 Ιουνίου. ECCLESIA.GR. (H ΕΚΚΛΗΣΙΑ ΤΗΣ ΕΛΛΑΔΟΣ).
- (in Greek) 06/06/2017. Ορθόδοξος Συναξαριστής.

Russian Sources

- (in Russian) 19 июня (6 июня). Православная Энциклопедия под редакцией Патриарха Московского и всея Руси Кирилла (электронная версия). (Orthodox Encyclopedia - Pravenc.ru).
- (in Russian) 6 июня по старому стилю / 19 июня по новому стилю. Русская Православная Церковь - Православный церковный календарь на 2016 год.
- (in Russian) 6 июня (ст.ст.) 19 июня 2014 (нов. ст.). Русская Православная Церковь Отдел внешних церковных связей. (DECR).
