= Concordius of Spoleto =

Christian saint and martyr

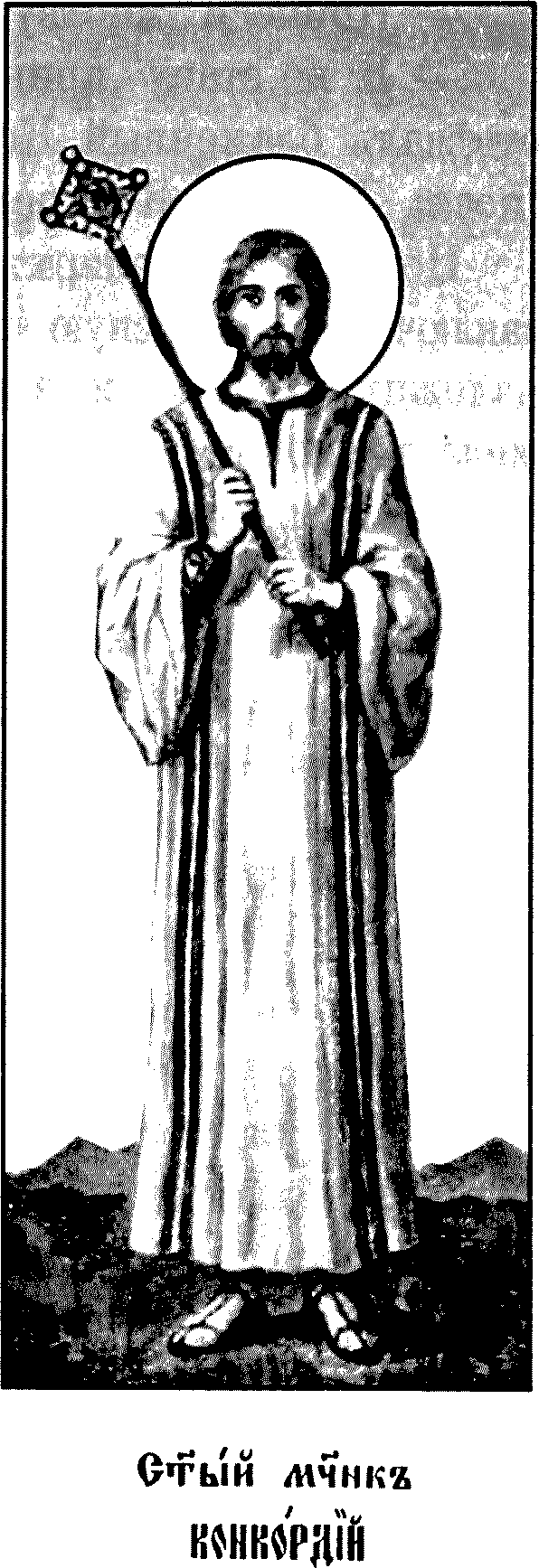

Martyr
- Born: unknown Rome, Roman Empire
- Died: c.175 Spoleto, Roman Empire
- Venerated in: Roman Catholic Church; Eastern Orthodox Church
- Canonized: Pre-congregation
- Feast: 2 January (Roman Catholic); 4 June and 1 January (Eastern Orthodox)

Concordius of Spoleto is a little-known Christian saint and martyr of the 2nd century. There is another martyr Concordius who died in the 4th century.

== Life ==
Concordius was the son of the presbyter Gordian. He was ordained a subdeacon by Pope Pius I in Rome, and was reclusive; spending most of his time alone and praying. He was imprisoned during the Christian persecutions of Marcus Aurelius and tried in Spoleto, Italy.

== Trial ==
The trial was overseen and judged by the governor of Umbria, Italy. Concordius was allowed his freedom if he would denounce his faith and worship a statue of the Roman god Jupiter. When Concordius refused, the judge had him beaten on a rack. After the torture however, Concordius praised Jesus, after which he was thrown in jail. Two days later, he was offered a second chance and presented with a statue to worship. Concordius then spat on the idol and was promptly beheaded, c.175 AD. Concordius was canonized by religious officials at that time, but it is unsure when or where this occurred.

== Veneration ==
His feast day is 2 January (Roman Catholic) and 4 June (Eastern Orthodox).
