= June 19 (Eastern Orthodox liturgics) =

Day in the Eastern Orthodox liturgical calendar

Eastern Orthodox liturgical calendar
June 18	June 19	June 20
June 19 O.S. ≍ July 2 N.S. June 19 N.S ≍ June 6 O.S.

An Eastern Orthodox cross

June 19 in Eastern Orthodox liturgical calendars is a feast day and a day of commemoration of saints and martyrs. Although some Orthodox churches use the Revised Julian Calendar and others use the traditional Julian calendar, the fixed commemorations for their respective June 19 are broadly the same, no matter which calendar is used. (Note: Despite the dates being the same, the days to which they refer typically differ by 13 days. The notation Old Style or O.S. is sometimes used to indicate a date in the traditional Julian Calendar (the "Old Calendar"). The notation New Style or N.S. indicates a date in the Revised Julian calendar (the "New Calendar").)

== Saints ==
- Holy Myrrh-bearer Mary, mother of the Apostle James (1st century)
- Holy Apostle Jude, the Brother of the Lord (c. 80)
- Martyr Zosimas the Soldier, of Apollonia, at Antioch in Pisidia (c. 89-117) (Note: "At Sozopolis, under the governor Domitian, during the persecution of Trajan, St. Zosimus, martyr, who suffered bitter tortures, was beheaded, and thus triumphantly went to heaven.")
- Saint Macarius of Petra (4th century)
- Venerable Zeno, hermit, of Egypt, wonderworker (4th century)
- Venerable Paisios the Great of Egypt, the God-bearer (5th century) (Note: Name days celebrated today include: Paisios (Παΐσιος).)
- Saint John the Solitary of Jerusalem (586)
- Hieromartyr Asyncretus, by the sword.

== Pre-Schism Western saints ==
- Martyrs Gervasius and Protasius, the twin sons of martyrs, under Nero (62 or 2nd century) (Note: In 386, during the episcopate of St Ambrose, the relics of Sts Gervase and Protase, the protomartyrs of the city, were discovered in Milan in Italy.) (Note: "At Milan, the holy martyrs Gervasius and Protasius, brothers. The former, by order of the judge Astasius, was so long scourged with leaded whips, that he expired. The latter, after being scourged with rods, was beheaded. Through divine revelation their bodies were found by St. Ambrose. They were partly covered with blood, and as free from corruption as if they had been put to death that very day. When the translation took place, a blind man recovered his sight by touching their relics, and many persons possessed by demons were delivered.") (see also: October 14 - in the East )
- Saint Ursicinus of Ravenna, a physician of Ravenna, martyred for being a Christian (c. 67) (Note: A doctor in Ravenna in Italy. Sentenced to death for being a Christian, he wavered but was encouraged by the soldier St Vitalis and accepted martyrdom.) (Note: "At Ravenna, St. Ursicinus, martyr, who remained firm through many torments in the confession of the Lord, and consummated his martyrdom by capital punishment, under the judge Paulinus.")
- Saint Zosimus, a martyr in Spoleto in Umbria in Italy under Trajan (110)
- Saint Gaudentius, Culmatius and Companions, martyred under Valentinian I (364) (Note: Gaudentius, a bishop, and Culmatius, his deacon, were martyred in Tuscany in Italy under Valentinian I. With them suffered Andrew, a layman, with his wife and children and a group of fifty-three companions.) (Note: "At Arezzo, in Tuscany, the holy martyrs Gaudentius, bishop, and Culmatius, deacon, who were murdered by the furious Gentiles, during the reign of Valentinian.")
- Saint Innocent, Bishop of Le Mans in France for over forty years (559)
- Saint Deodatus of Nevers (Deodatus of Jointures, Dié, Didier, Dieu-Donné, Adéodat), a bishop who founded the monastery of Val-de-Galilée - Jointures in France (c. 680) (Note: Bishop of Nevers in France in 655, he later lived as a hermit in the Vosges. Later he founded a monastery at Ebersheimmünster near Strasbourg.)
- Saint Hildegrim of Châlons, Bishop of Châlons-sur-Marne in France and then Abbot of Werden in Germany (827) (Note: Younger brother of St Ludger, whom he helped in enlightening the Saxons.)
- Saint Bruno of Querfurt (Bruno-Boniface), a missionary bishop, the second "Apostle of the Prussians" (1009) (Note: Born in Querfurt in Germany, he accompanied the half-Greek Emperor Otto III to Italy in 996 and became a monk there. He became Archbishop of Mersburg and was sent to enlighten the heathen Prussians. He was martyred with eighteen companions.) (Note: "The same day, St. Boniface, martyr, a disciple of blessed Romuald, who was sent by the Roman Pontiff to preach the Gospel in Russia. Having passed through fire uninjured, and baptized the king and his people, he was killed by the enraged brother of the king, and thus gained the palm of martyrdom which he ardently desired.")
- Saint Romuald, Abbot of Camaldoli, Ravenna, and a major figure in the eleventh-century "Renaissance of eremitical asceticism" (1027) (Note: Born in Ravenna in Italy, in his youth he saw his father commit a murder and resolved to repent for it by becoming a monk at Classe near Ravenna. In 996 he became abbot of that monastery. However, he left it in 999 and led a wandering life, establishing hermitages and monasteries, among them Camaldoli near Arezzo in 1009.) (Note: "At Ravenna, St. Romuald, anchoret, founder of the monks of Camaldoli, who restored and greatly extended monastic discipline, which was much relaxed in Italy.")

== Post-Schism Orthodox saints ==
- Venerable Barlaam of Shenkursk, monk (1462) (Note: See: (in Russian) Василий Степанович Своеземцев. Википедии. (Russian Wikipedia).)
- Saint Job, Patriarch of Moscow (1607)
- Venerable Paisius of Hilendar, the Bulgarian (18th century)
- Saint John (Maximovitch), Archbishop of Shanghai and San Francisco (1966) (Note: He was an advocate of restoring ancient Western Rites to modern usage within the Orthodox Church. In ROCOR St. John's feast is celebrated on the nearest Saturday to June 19 OS (July 2 NS) if it does not already fall on a Saturday or Sunday.)

== Other commemorations ==
- Repose of Schemamonk Theoktist, desert-dweller, of Valaam (1863)
- Repose of Archbishop Leonty of Chile (1971)

== Icon gallery ==
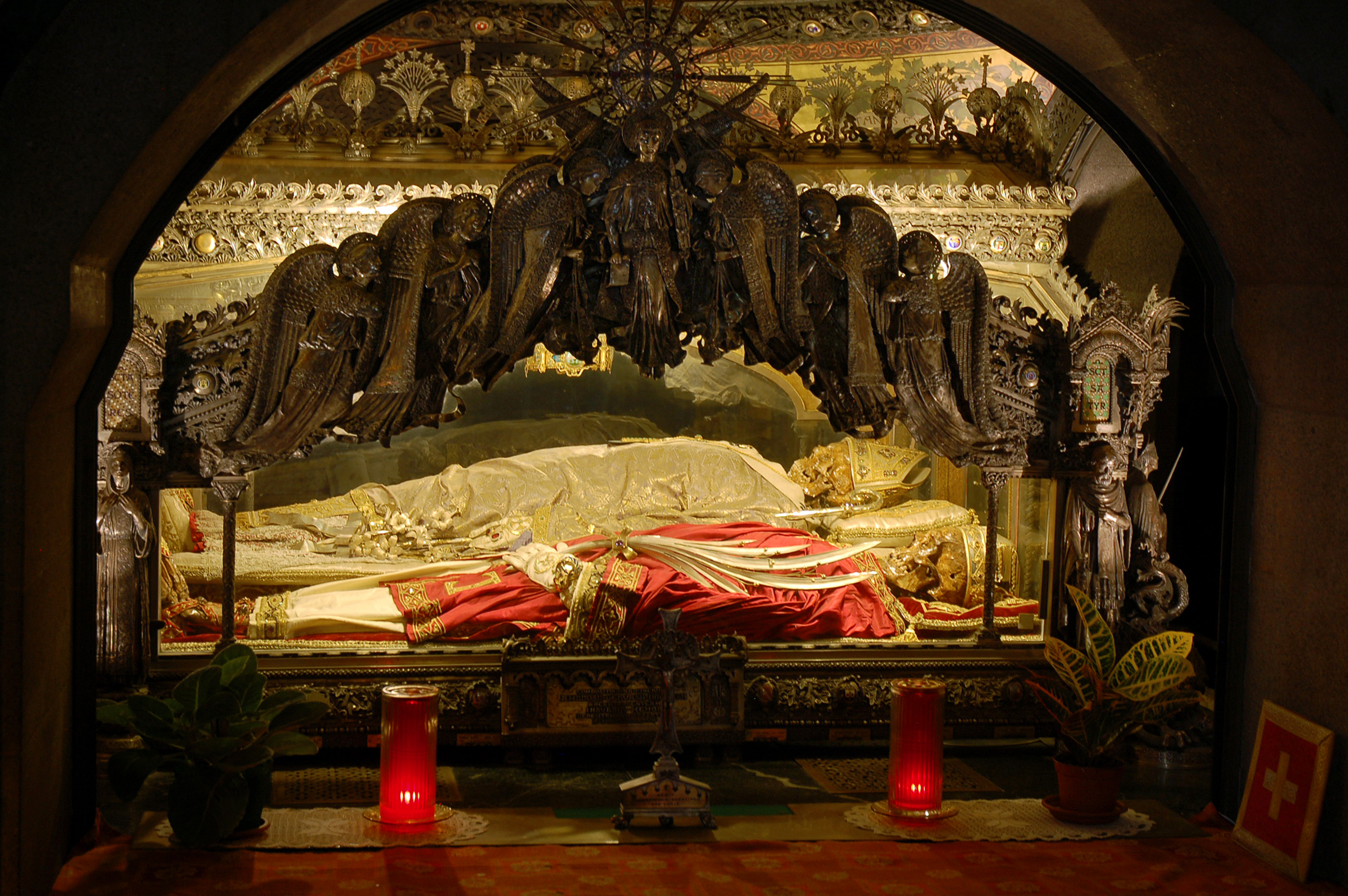
Crypt of Bp. Ambrose and two martyrs, Saints Gervasius and Protasius.

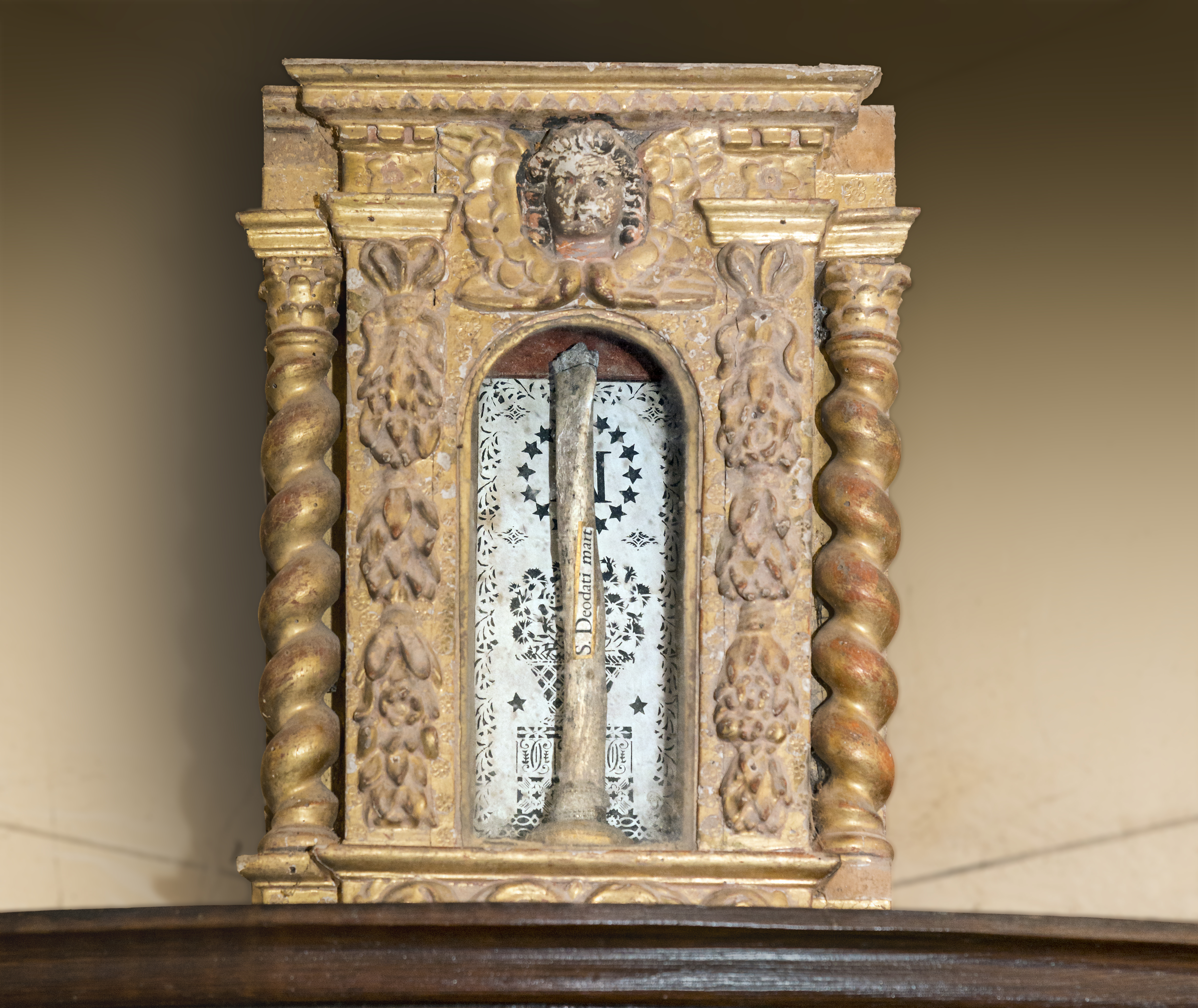
Reliquary of Deodatus of Nevers.

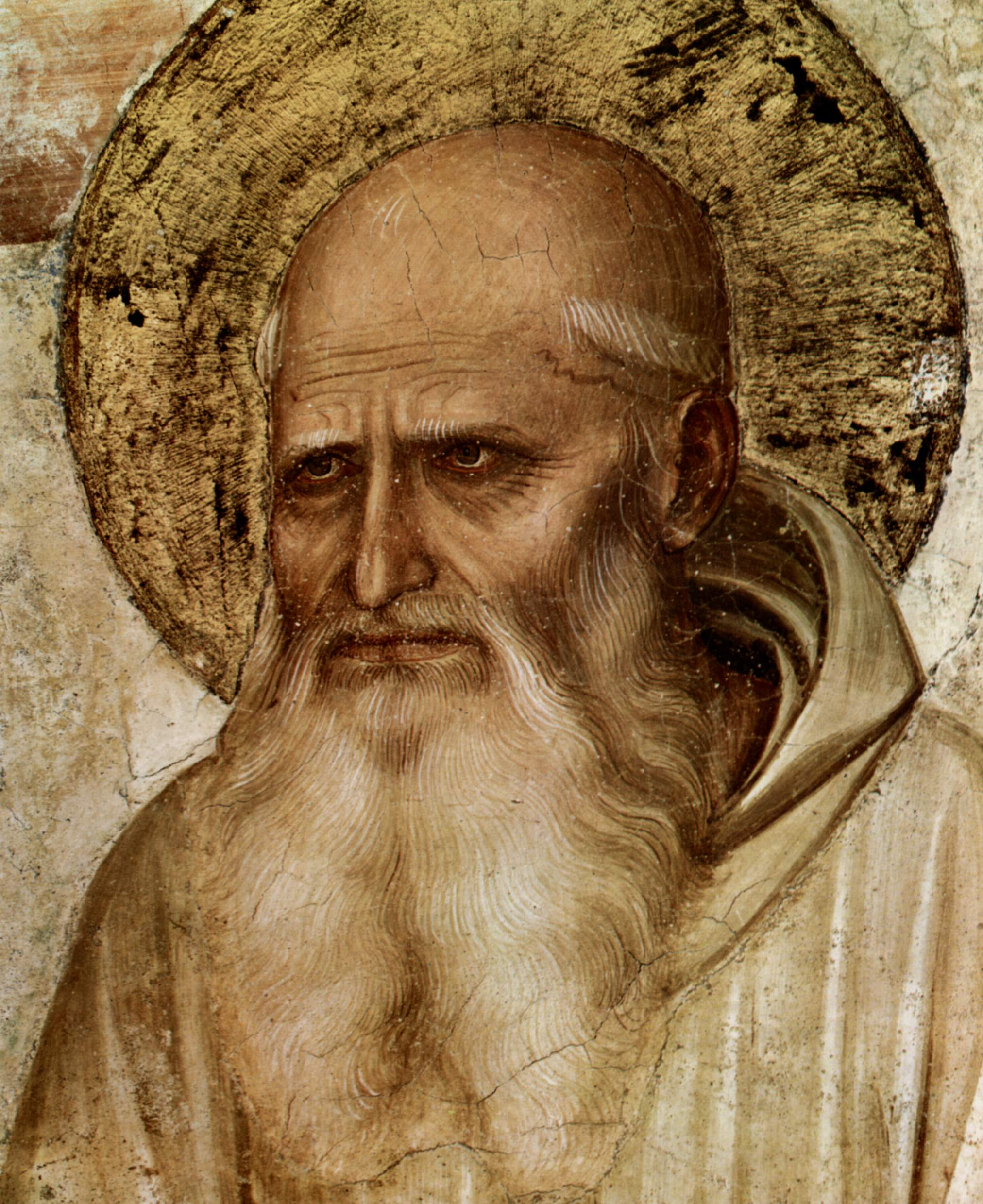
St. Romuald, Abbot of Camaldoli, Ravenna.

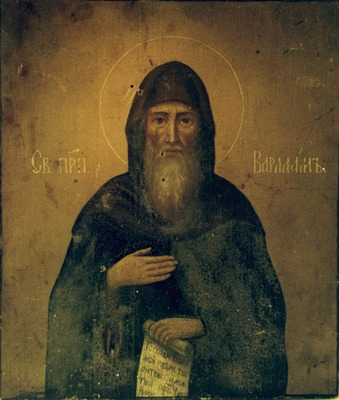
Venerable Barlaam of Shenkursk.

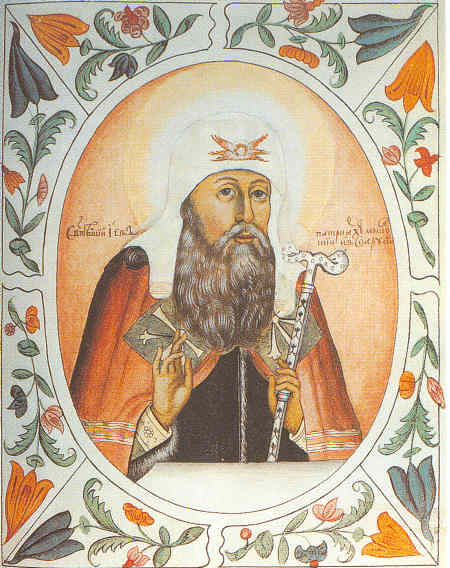
St. Job, Patriarch of Moscow.

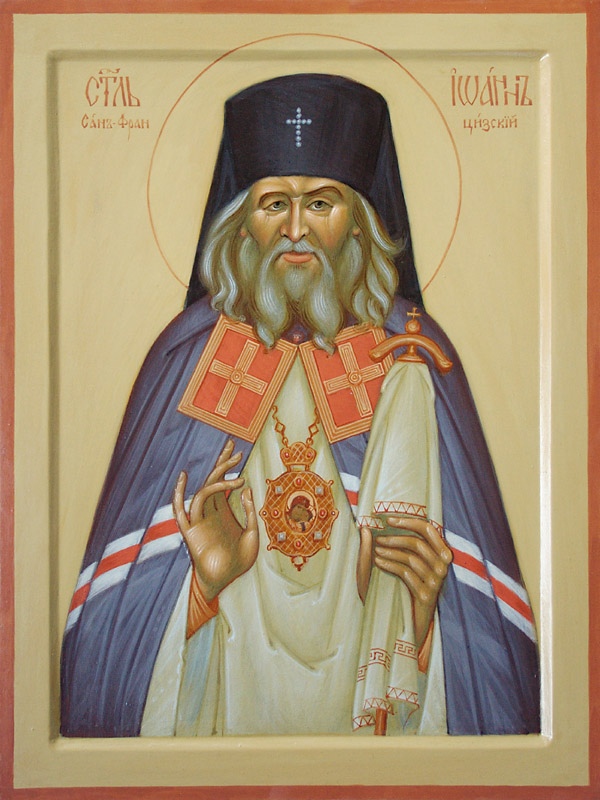
St. John (Maximovitch), Archbishop of Shanghai and San Francisco.

== Sources ==
- June 19/July 2. Orthodox Calendar (PRAVOSLAVIE.RU).
- July 2 / June 19. HOLY TRINITY RUSSIAN ORTHODOX CHURCH (A parish of the Patriarchate of Moscow).
- June 19. OCA - The Lives of the Saints.
- The Autonomous Orthodox Metropolia of Western Europe and the Americas (ROCOR). St. Hilarion Calendar of Saints for the year of our Lord 2004. St. Hilarion Press (Austin, TX). p. 45.
- The Nineteenth Day of the Month of June. Orthodoxy in China.
- June 19. Latin Saints of the Orthodox Patriarchate of Rome.
- The Roman Martyrology. Transl. by the Archbishop of Baltimore. Last Edition, According to the Copy Printed at Rome in 1914. Revised Edition, with the Imprimatur of His Eminence Cardinal Gibbons. Baltimore: John Murphy Company, 1916. pp. 178–179.
- Rev. Richard Stanton. A Menology of England and Wales, or, Brief Memorials of the Ancient British and English Saints Arranged According to the Calendar, Together with the Martyrs of the 16th and 17th Centuries. London: Burns & Oates, 1892. pp. 275–276.

Greek Sources

- Great Synaxaristes: (in Greek) 19 ΙΟΥΝΙΟΥ. ΜΕΓΑΣ ΣΥΝΑΞΑΡΙΣΤΗΣ.
- (in Greek) Συναξαριστής. 19 Ιουνίου. ECCLESIA.GR. (H ΕΚΚΛΗΣΙΑ ΤΗΣ ΕΛΛΑΔΟΣ).
- (in Greek) 19 Ιουνίου. Αποστολική Διακονία της Εκκλησίας της Ελλάδος (Apostoliki Diakonia of the Church of Greece).
- (in Greek) 19/06/2018. Ορθόδοξος Συναξαριστής.

Russian Sources

- (in Russian) 2 июля (19 июня). Православная Энциклопедия под редакцией Патриарха Московского и всея Руси Кирилла (электронная версия). (Orthodox Encyclopedia - Pravenc.ru).
- (in Russian) 19 июня по старому стилю / 2 июля по новому стилю. Русская Православная Церковь - Православный церковный календарь на 2017 год.
- (in Russian) 19 июня (ст.ст.) 2 июля 2014 (нов. ст.). Русская Православная Церковь Отдел внешних церковных связей. (DECR).
