= June 18 (Eastern Orthodox liturgics) =

Day in the Eastern Orthodox liturgical calendar

Eastern Orthodox liturgical calendar
| June 17 | June 18 | June 19 |
June 18 O.S. ≍ July 1 N.S. June 18 N.S ≍ June 5 O.S.

An Eastern Orthodox cross

June 18 in Eastern Orthodox liturgical calendars is a feast day and a day of commemoration of saints and martyrs. Although some Orthodox churches use the Revised Julian Calendar and others use the traditional Julian calendar, the fixed commemorations for their respective June 18 are broadly the same, no matter which calendar is used. (Note: Despite the dates being the same, the days to which they refer typically differ by 13 days. The notation Old Style or O.S. is sometimes used to indicate a date in the traditional Julian Calendar (the "Old Calendar"). The notation New Style or N.S. indicates a date in the Revised Julian calendar (the "New Calendar").)

== Saints ==
- Martyrs Leontius, Hypatius and Theodoulos at Tripoli in Phoenicia (70–79) (Note: "At Tripoli, in Phoenicia, in the time of the governor Adrian, St. Leontius, a soldier, who, through bitter torments, attained to the crown of martyrdom, together with the tribune Hypatius and Theodulus, whom he had converted to Christ.") (Note: "SAINT LEONTIUS was a soldier at Tripoli, in Phoenicia, who believed in Christ, and refused to sacrifice to the genius of the empire, and to the heathen gods. He converted Hypatius and Theodulus, two other officers, the former of whom he cured of fever. By order of Hadrian they were all three executed.")
- Martyr Aetherus of Nicomedia (305) (Note: "The same day, St. Ætherius, martyr, in the persecution of Diocletian. After enduring fire and other torments, he was put to death with the sword.")
- The Two Martyrs of Cyprus.
- Saint Marina the Virgin, of Bithynia (8th century) (Note: "At Alexandria, the passion of St. Marina, virgin.")
- Venerable Leontius the Shepherd, monk.
- Venerable Erasmus.

== Pre-Schism Western saints ==
- Saints Mark and Marcellian, twin brothers and deacons who suffered in Rome under Maximian (c. 287) (Note: "AT Rome, on the Ardeatine road, in the persecution of Diocletian, the birthday of the saintly brothers Marcus and Marcellian, martyrs, who were arrested by the judge Fabian, tied to a stake, and had sharp nails driven into their feet. As they ceased not to praise the name of Christ, they were pierced through the sides with lances, and thus went to the kingdom of heaven with the glory of martyrdom.")
- Saints Cyriacus and Paula of Málaga, two Christians, stoned to death in Málaga in Spain in the Diocletianic Persecution (305) (Note: "At Malaga, in Spain, the holy martyrs Cyriacus, and the virgin Paula, who were overwhelmed with stones, and yielded up their souls to God.")
- Martyr Elpidios, in Gaul (4th century)
- Saint Amandus of Bordeaux, successor of St Delphinus as Bishop of Bordeaux in France, Confessor (c. 431) (Note: See: (in French) Amand de Bordeaux. Wikipédia. (French Wikipedia).)
- Saint Alena of Brussels, martyr (c. 640) (Note: Born of pagan parents near Brussels in Belgium, Alena was baptised without their knowledge. She was put to death while secretly going to the liturgy.)
- Saint Calogerus the Anchorite, a Greek who lived for thirty-five years as a hermit near Girgenti in Sicily after preaching Christ in the isles of Lipari (c. 486) (Note: "At Sacca, in Sicily, St. Calogerus, hermit, whose holiness is principally manifested by the deliverance of possessed persons.")
- Saints Gregory, Demetrius and Calogerus, respectively a bishop, archdeacon and abbot in North Africa, driven out by Arian Vandals (5th century) (Note: They were defenders of Trinitarianism against Arianism. They settled in Fragalata near Messina in Sicily and preached the Gospel there. They are honoured as the patron-saints of Fragalata.)
- Saint Fortunatus the Philosopher, a bishop driven from the north of Italy by the Lombards (c. 569) (Note: Hagiographer from Vercelli, wrote a life of Saint Marcellus, the Bishop of Paris.)
- Saint Osmanna (Osanna), a nun at the convent of Jouarre in France (c. 700)
- Saint Guy of Baume, successor of St Berno at Baume Abbey in France, later a hermit near Fay-en-Bresse (c. 940)

== Post-Schism Orthodox saints ==
- Venerable Peter of Koriša, aristocrat who gave away his possessions to become a monk at the Monastery of the Holy Archangels, later a hermit in the Šar Mountains (1275) (Note: See: (in Serbian) Петар Коришки. Википедију. (Serbian Wikipedia).) (see also: June 5 )
- Venerable Leontius, canonarch of the Kiev Caves (14th century)
- Venerable Leontius the Myrrh-gusher (Leontius the Hagiorite), of Argos and of Dionysiou monastery on Mount Athos, clairvoyant (1605)

=== New martyrs and confessors ===
- New Hieromartyr Nicanor (Morozkin), Archimandrite, of Spas-Ruzsky, Moscow (1938)
- New Hieromartyrs Basil Smirnov, Alexander Krutitsky, Basil Krylov and Sergius Krotkov, Priests (1938)
- New Hieromartyr Ioannicius (Lipovac), Metropolitan of Montenegro and the Littoral, executed by Communist partisans at the close of World War II (1945) (see also: June 4 )

== Other commemorations ==
- Synaxis of the Church of the Commander-in-Chief Michael the Archangel, near the Church of St. Julian in the Forum, Constantinople.
- Bogolubov Icon of the Most Holy Theotokos (1155)
- Meeting of the Piukhtitsa ("At the Source") Icon of the Most Holy Theotokos (1894, 1946)
- Uncovering of the relics (1997) of New Hiero-confessor Victor (Ostrovidov), Bishop of Glazov (1934) (Note: See: (in Russian) Виктор (Островидов). Википедии. (Russian Wikipedia).)

== Icon gallery ==
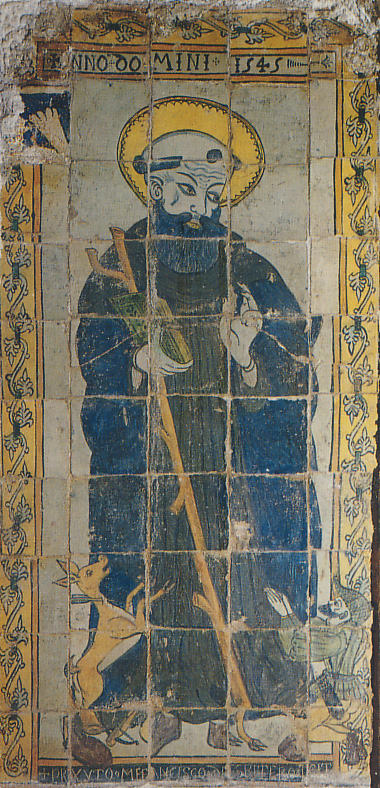
St. Calogerus the Anchorite.

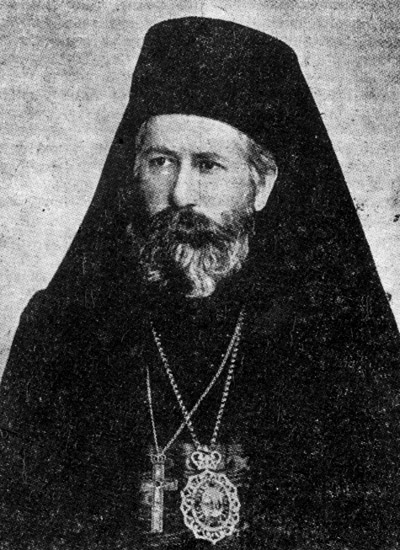
New Hieromartyr Ioannicius (Lipovac), Metropolitan of Montenegro and the Littoral.

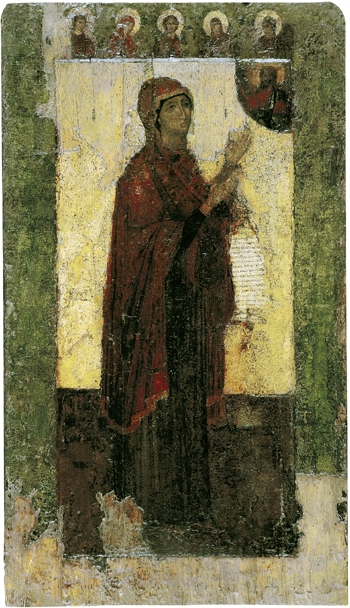
Theotokos of Bogolyubovo (12th century).

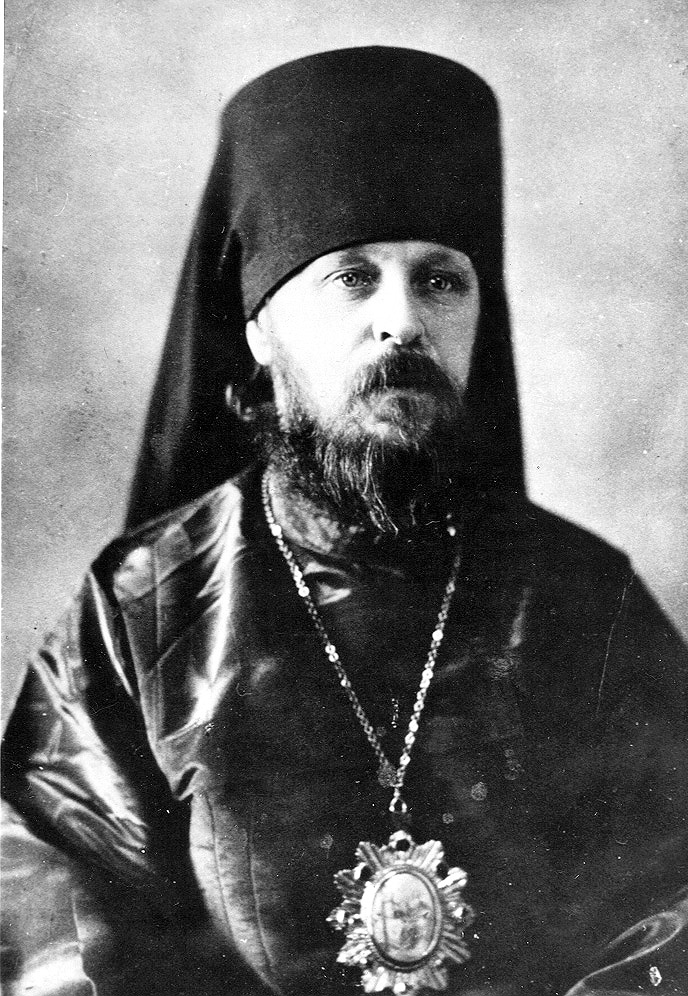
New Hiero-confessor Victor (Ostrovidov), Bishop of Glazov.

== Sources ==
- June 18/July 1. Orthodox Calendar (PRAVOSLAVIE.RU).
- July 1 / June 18. HOLY TRINITY RUSSIAN ORTHODOX CHURCH (A parish of the Patriarchate of Moscow).
- June 18. OCA - The Lives of the Saints.
- The Autonomous Orthodox Metropolia of Western Europe and the Americas (ROCOR). St. Hilarion Calendar of Saints for the year of our Lord 2004. St. Hilarion Press (Austin, TX). p. 45.
- The Eighteenth Day of the Month of June. Orthodoxy in China.
- June 18. Latin Saints of the Orthodox Patriarchate of Rome.
- The Roman Martyrology. Transl. by the Archbishop of Baltimore. Last Edition, According to the Copy Printed at Rome in 1914. Revised Edition, with the Imprimatur of His Eminence Cardinal Gibbons. Baltimore: John Murphy Company, 1916. pp. 177–178.
- Rev. Richard Stanton. A Menology of England and Wales, or, Brief Memorials of the Ancient British and English Saints Arranged According to the Calendar, Together with the Martyrs of the 16th and 17th Centuries. London: Burns & Oates, 1892. pp. 274–275.

Greek Sources

- Great Synaxaristes: (in Greek) 18 ΙΟΥΝΙΟΥ. ΜΕΓΑΣ ΣΥΝΑΞΑΡΙΣΤΗΣ.
- (in Greek) Συναξαριστής. 18 Ιουνίου. ECCLESIA.GR. (H ΕΚΚΛΗΣΙΑ ΤΗΣ ΕΛΛΑΔΟΣ).
- (in Greek) 18 Ιουνίου. Αποστολική Διακονία της Εκκλησίας της Ελλάδος (Apostoliki Diakonia of the Church of Greece).
- (in Greek) 18/06/2018. Ορθόδοξος Συναξαριστής.

Russian Sources

- (in Russian) 1 июля (18 июня). Православная Энциклопедия под редакцией Патриарха Московского и всея Руси Кирилла (электронная версия). (Orthodox Encyclopedia - Pravenc.ru).
- (in Russian) 18 июня по старому стилю / 1 июля по новому стилю. Русская Православная Церковь - Православный церковный календарь на 2017 год.
- (in Russian) 18 июня (ст.ст.) 1 июля 2014 (нов. ст.). Русская Православная Церковь Отдел внешних церковных связей. (DECR).
