= June 7 (Eastern Orthodox liturgics) =

Day in the Eastern Orthodox liturgical calendar

Eastern Orthodox liturgical calendar
June 6	June 7	June 8
June 7 O.S. ≍ June 20 N.S. June 7 N.S ≍ May 25 O.S.

An Eastern Orthodox cross

June 7 in Eastern Orthodox liturgical calendars is a feast day and a day of commemoration of saints and martyrs. Although some Orthodox churches use the Revised Julian Calendar and others use the traditional Julian calendar, the fixed commemorations for their respective June 7 are broadly the same, no matter which calendar is used. (Note: Despite the dates being the same, the days to which they refer typically differ by 13 days. The notation Old Style or O.S. is sometimes used to indicate a date in the traditional Julian Calendar (the "Old Calendar"). The notation New Style or N.S. indicates a date in the Revised Julian calendar (the "New Calendar").)

== Saints ==
- Martyrs Aesia and Susanna, disciples of St. Pancratius of Taormina (1st century)
- Virgin-martyr Potamiaena (193-211):

- and with her, martyrs: Plutarch, Serenus, Heraclides, Heron, Herais, Marcella, and Basilides, of Alexandria.

- Martyr Zenaida (Zenais) of Caesarea in Palestine, Wonderworker.
- Hieromartyr Theodotus of Ancyra, Bishop (303) (see also: May 18)
- Hieromartyr Marcellinus, Pope of Rome, and with him Martyrs Claudius, Cyrinus, and Antoninus (304) (see also: April 26 - in the West)
- Saint Marcellus, Pope of Rome, and with him the Martyrs (304-310): (see also: January 16 - in the West)

- Deacons Sisinius and Cyriacus;
- Soldiers Smaragdus, Largus, Apronian, Saturninus, Pappias, and Maurus;
- Crescentian, Priscilla, Lucia, and Princess Artemia.

- Martyr Lycarion of Tanis (Hermopolis) in Egypt. (Note: "In Egypt, St. Licarion, martyr, who was lacerated, scourged with heated iron rods, and, after other horrible torments, was crowned with martyrdom by a stroke from the sword.")
- Martyrs John and Tarasios, by the sword.
- Martyrs Cyria, Kaleria (Valeria), and Maria, of Caesarea in Palestine (4th century) (see also: June 6 )
- Saint Daniel of Scetis in Egypt (420)
- Saints Stephen and Anthimus of Constantinople, Priests, of the Fervent Ones ("the Ever-Vigilant") (5th century)
- Saint Sebastiani the Wonderworker.
- Venerable Anatolius the Sinaite.

== Pre-Schism Western saints ==
- Saint Paul I of Constantinople, an Archbishop of Constantinople whose episcopate was largely spent in exile for Orthodoxy (350) (Note: Elected in 336, he was exiled to Pontus in 337, from where he returned in 338, but was exiled again by an Arian Council, this time to Trier in Germany. He returned in c 340, but in 342 was sent in chains to Mesopotamia by the Emperor Constantius. Recalled in 344, he was banished for the last time to Cukusus in Armenia, where he was left without food for six days and then strangled.) (Note: "In the Irish Church, the Feast of this illustrious Martyr St. Paul, Bishop of Constantinople, was formerly held, as we find, by reference to the "Feilire" of St. Ængus, where a eulogy occurs on his triumph. This holy Prelate was a native of Thessalonica, and afterwards he was deacon at Constantinople, in the year 340. Then, the Archbishop on his death-bed recommended him as successor, and he was accordingly elected. However, he was bitterly persecuted by the Arians, and having been banished from his See by the Emperor Constantius, who favoured the Arian heresy, he was transported to Cucusus, a small town in Cappadocia, where his enemies conspired against his life. Meantime, Macedonius had been obtruded on the citizens of Constantinople as their bishop, with great popular tumult, and much bloodshed. Having been captured by the Eusebians, St. Paul was hanged or strangled, about the middle of the fourth century. His death has been placed, at June 7th, A.D. 344. The body of St. Paul was afterwards brought by the Emperor Theodosius to Constantinople, with every demonstration of honour and reverence. The Bollandist Father Francis Baert, has an account of him, in Four Chapters, to which a Preliminary Dissertation is prefixed, while two distinct Appendices follow. The remains of St. Paul, repose at Constantinople, in a church so called; and on the fall of that city, they were removed to Venice, A.D. 1226, where they are kept with great respect, in the Church of St. Lorenzo.") (see also: November 6 - in the East)
- Saint Colmán of Dromore, Bishop of Dromore, Ireland (6th century) (Note: Probably born in Ireland, he became Bishop of Dromore in Co. Down. By tradition he was the teacher of St Finnian of Clonard.)
- Venerable Vulphy (Wulflagius), a priest near Abbeville in the north of France who lived and reposed as a hermit, wonderworker (c. 643) (Note: He was greatly venerated in Montreuil-sur-Mer.) (Note: "[Gallican Martyrology of Saussaye, Ancient Martyrology of Centulle, and venerated in the diocese of Amiens. Authority:—An ancient life quoted by Ignatius the Carmelite in his Historia Abbavillana, 1480.]" "S. Wulphlag, a native of Ponthieu, from his earliest childhood was devoted to the service of the altar. He married a pious wife shortly before he was ordained priest, and by her became the father of three daughters, who grew up virtuous and God-fearing. S. Wulphlag was appointed to the charge of Rue, near the sea, between the rivers Somme and Authie. But after a while he went on a pilgrimage to Jerusalem, and on his return announced to his wife and daughters that he was resolved to embrace an eremitical life. He retired into a cell which he constructed at Regnie l'Ecluse, in a wild and desolate spot. He was consoled there with the news that his daughters had renounced the world and taken the vows of monastic life. He died in his hermitage, and was buried at Requier. His body was afterwards translated to S. Sauve, at Montreuil-sur-Mer, where it now rests.") (Note: See: (in French) Wulphy. Wikipédia. (French Wikipedia).)
- Venerable Modwenna, the successor of St. Hilda as Abbess of Whitby (c. 695 or 699)
- Venerable martyr Aventinus, born in Bagnères-de-Luchon in the Pyrenees in France, he became a hermit in the valley of Larboush, where the Saracens martyred him (732) (Note: See: (in French) Aventin de Larboust. Wikipédia. (French Wikipedia).)
- Saint Willibald, Bishop of Eichstätt in Bavaria (c. 787)
- Venerable Deochar (Theutger or Gottlieb), a hermit in Franconia in Germany, he became the first abbot of the monastery of Herriedon (847) (Note: See: (in German) Deocar. Wikipedia. (German Wikipedia).)
- Martyrs Peter, Wallabonsus, Sabinian, Wistremundus, Habentius and Jeremiah, martyred under Abderrahman in Córdoba for publicly denouncing Mohammed (851) (Note: Peter was a priest; Wallabonsus, a deacon; Sabinian and Wistremundus, monks of St Zoilus in Cordoba in Spain; Habentius, a monk of St Christopher's; Jeremiah, a very old man, had founded the monastery of Tábanos, near Cordoba. For publicly denouncing Mohammed they were martyred under Abderrahman in Cordoba. Jeremiah was scourged to death; the others were beheaded.) (Note: "At Cordova, the holy martyrs Peter, priest, Wallabonsus, deacon, Sabinian, Wistremundus, Habentius, and Jeremias, monks.") (Note: "[Spanish and Roman Martyrologies. Authority:—S. Eulogius of Cordova, a martyr in the same persecution.]" "Peter a priest, Walabons a deacon, Sabinian, Wistremund, Habentius, and Jeremias, monks, suffered in the persecution of the Mussulmans in Spain. Sabinian was quite a young man, but Jeremias was very old. He had been married and had a family, but in his old age renounced the world and entered a monastery. They presented themselves before the cadi of Cordova, declaring that they were Christians and ready to die for their faith. Jeremias was first scourged and then, with the rest, decapitated.")
- Venerable Meriadoc (Meriadec), born in Wales, he became a hermit and later Bishop of Vannes in Brittany (c. 886)
- Saint Odo of Massay, Abbot of Massay in France (935-967)

== Post-Schism Orthodox saints ==
- Venerable Anthony (in schema Abramius), monk of Kozhaezersk Monastery (1634)
- Venerable Anastasios Gordios, the "Teacher of the Nation", at Vragiana, Evrytania, Greece (1729) (Note: Venerable Anastasios Gordios was one of the most important scholarly clerics during the Turkish occupation. He is numbered among the Teachers of the Nation and is considered a precursor to the Modern Greek Enlightenment. His fragrant skull is today treasured at St. Paraskevi Monastery in Agrafa.) (Note: See: (in Greek) Αναστάσιος Γόρδιος. Βικιπαίδεια. (Greek Wikipedia).)
- Venerable Panagis Bassias, Priest of Cephalonia (1883 or 1888)
- Saint Ioannicius (Rudniev), Metropolitan of Kiev and Galich (1900) (Note: See: (in Russian) Иоанникий (Руднев). Википе́дия. (Russian Wikipedia).) (see also: August 30)

=== New martyrs and confessors ===
- New Hieromartyr Andronicus (Nikolsky), Archbishop of Perm (1918)
- New Hieromartyrs (1918):

- Alexander Osetrov, Valentine Belov, Veniamin Lukanin, (Note: See: (in Russian) Луканин, Вениамин Васильевич. Википе́дия. (Russian Wikipedia).) Viktor Nikiforov, Alexander Mahetov, Paul Anoshkin, Vladimir Belozerov, Ignatius Yakimov, Michael Denisov, Nicholas Onanyov, Paul Sokolov, Alexander Preobrazhensky, Nicholas Rozhdestvensky, Nicholas Konyukhov, Priests;
- New Hieromartyr Gregory Smirnov, Deacon;
- Martyrs Athanasius Zhulanov and Alexsander Zuev.

- New Hieromartyr Peter Kuznetsov, Priest (1919)

== Other commemorations ==
- Synaxis of the Saints of Ivanovo.
- Repose of Anthony Ivanovich, Fool-for-Christ of Valaam (1832)

== Icon gallery ==
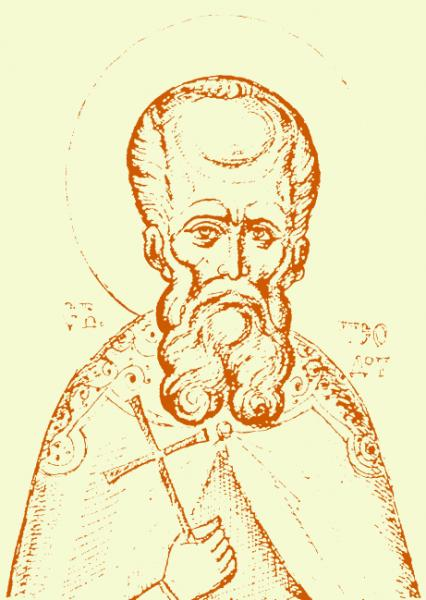
Hieromartyr Theodotus of Ancyra, Bishop.

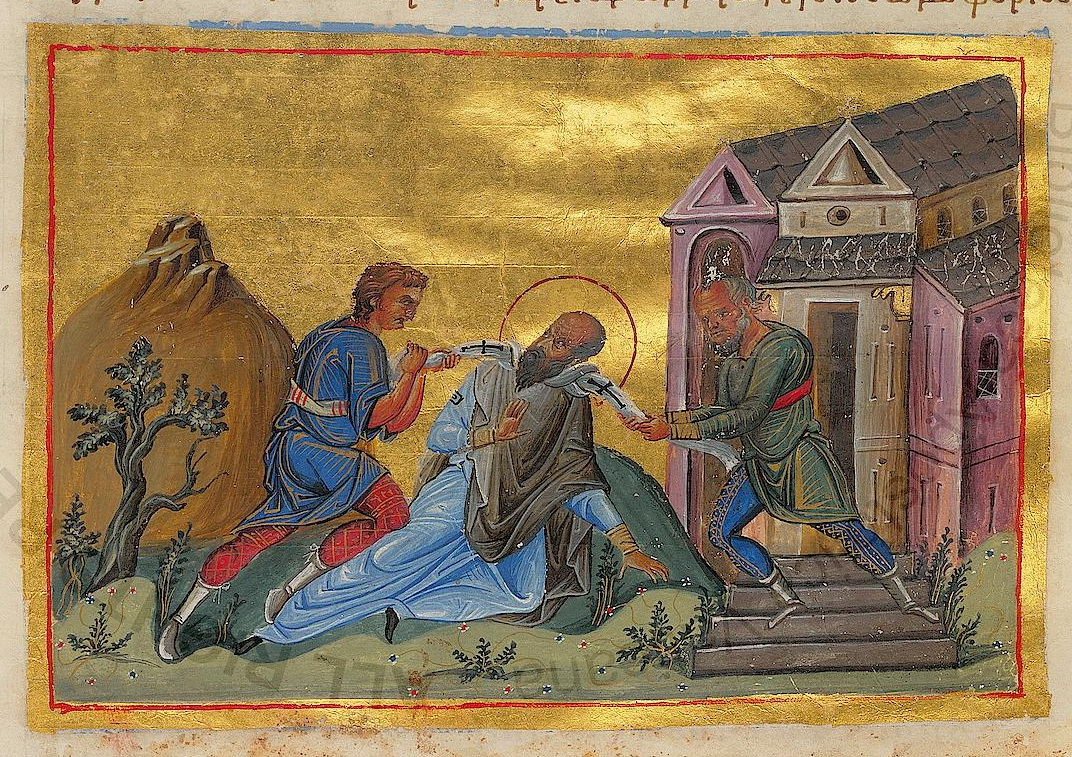
St. Paul I of Constantinople, Archbishop of Constantinople.

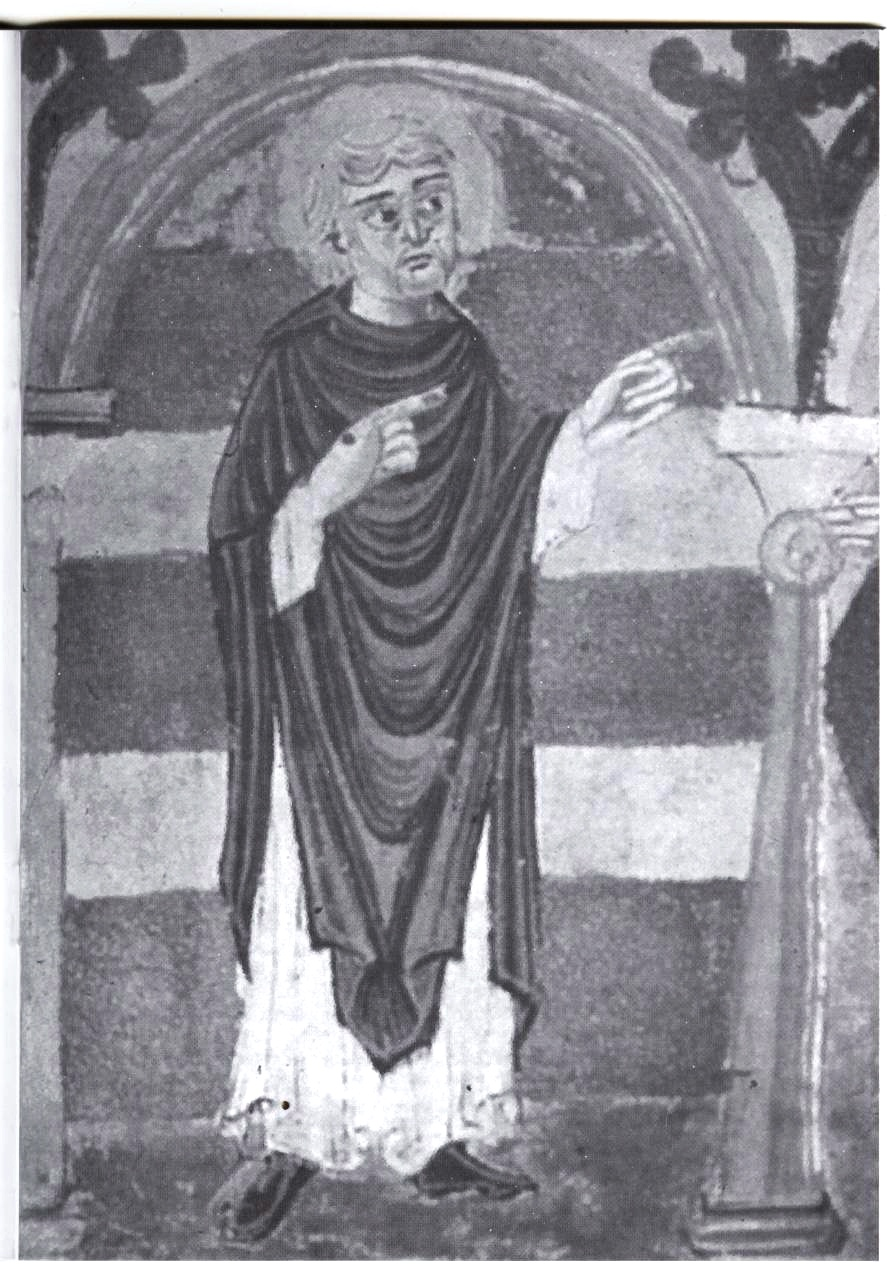
Venerable Deochar.

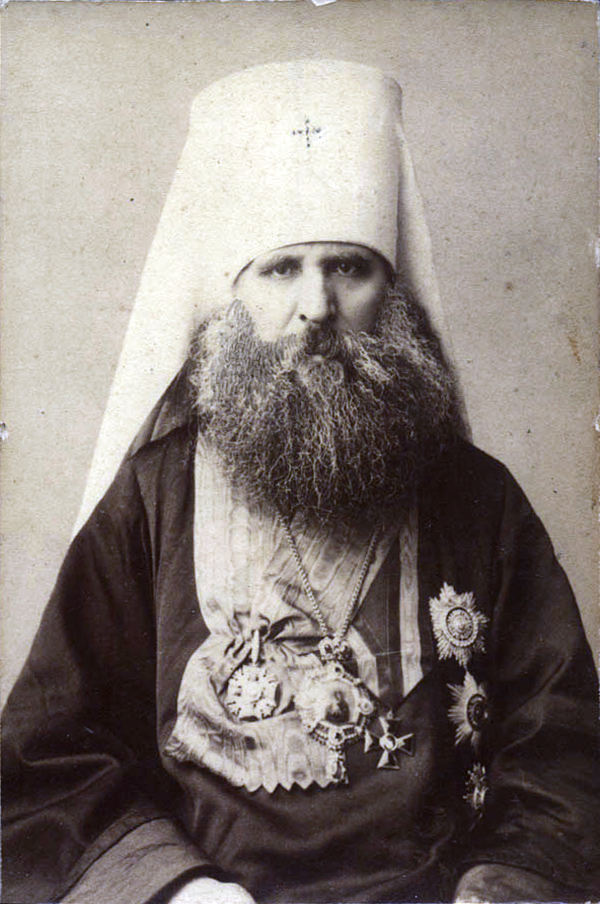
St. Ioannicius (Rudnyev), Metropolitan of Kiev and Galich.

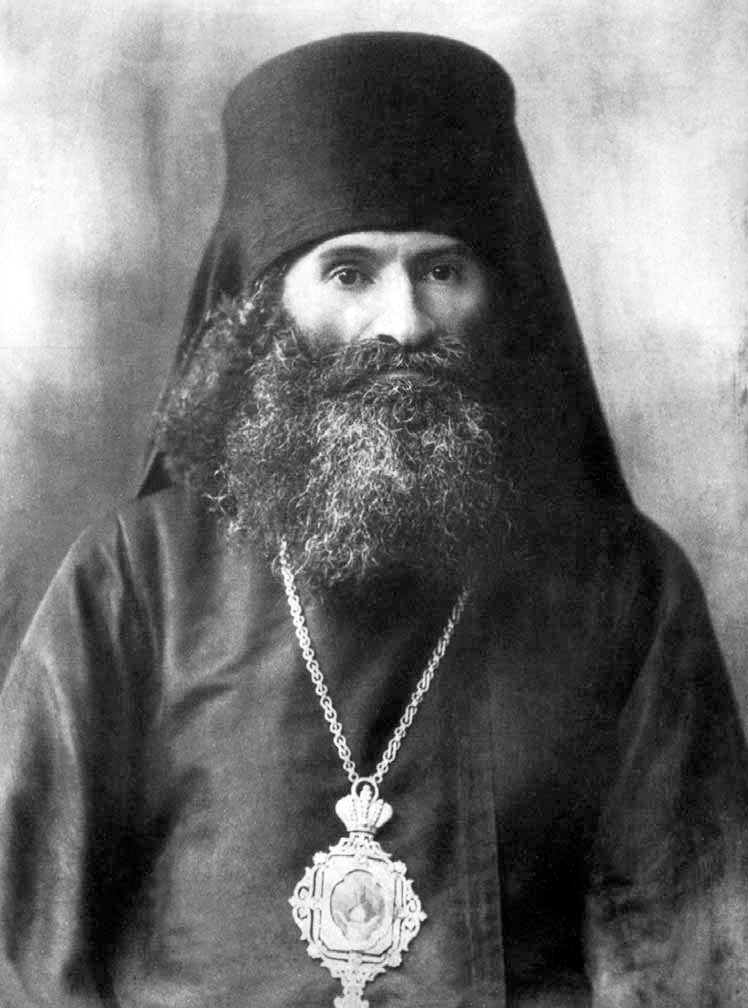
New Hieromartyr Andronicus (Nikolsky), Archbishop of Perm.

== Sources ==
- June 7/20. Orthodox Calendar (PRAVOSLAVIE.RU).
- June 20 / June 7. HOLY TRINITY RUSSIAN ORTHODOX CHURCH (A parish of the Patriarchate of Moscow).
- June 7. OCA - The Lives of the Saints.
- The Autonomous Orthodox Metropolia of Western Europe and the Americas (ROCOR). St. Hilarion Calendar of Saints for the year of our Lord 2004. St. Hilarion Press (Austin, TX). p. 42.
- The Seventh Day of the Month of June. Orthodoxy in China.
- June 7. Latin Saints of the Orthodox Patriarchate of Rome.
- The Roman Martyrology. Transl. by the Archbishop of Baltimore. Last Edition, According to the Copy Printed at Rome in 1914. Revised Edition, with the Imprimatur of His Eminence Cardinal Gibbons. Baltimore: John Murphy Company, 1916. pp. 166–167.
- Rev. Richard Stanton. A Menology of England and Wales, or, Brief Memorials of the Ancient British and English Saints Arranged According to the Calendar, Together with the Martyrs of the 16th and 17th Centuries. London: Burns & Oates, 1892. pp. 260–261.

Greek Sources

- Great Synaxaristes: (in Greek) 7 ΙΟΥΝΙΟΥ. ΜΕΓΑΣ ΣΥΝΑΞΑΡΙΣΤΗΣ.
- (in Greek) Συναξαριστής. 7 Ιουνίου. ECCLESIA.GR. (H ΕΚΚΛΗΣΙΑ ΤΗΣ ΕΛΛΑΔΟΣ).
- (in Greek) 07/06/2017. Ορθόδοξος Συναξαριστής.

Russian Sources

- (in Russian) 20 июня (7 июня). Православная Энциклопедия под редакцией Патриарха Московского и всея Руси Кирилла (электронная версия). (Orthodox Encyclopedia - Pravenc.ru).
- (in Russian) 7 июня по старому стилю / 20 июня по новому стилю. Русская Православная Церковь - Православный церковный календарь на 2016 год.
- (in Russian) 7 июня (ст.ст.) 20 июня 2014 (нов. ст.). Русская Православная Церковь Отдел внешних церковных связей. (DECR).
