= Theodore of the Jordan =

St. Theodore is an Orthodox saint who is recorded to have lived in the sixth century.

In his youth Theodore accepted the call from Christ to enter into the desert as a monk solitary. As a fruit of the Holy Spirit he received the gift of miracle working for the sake of those whom God brought into his life to serve.

It is recorded that:

Thus, while journeying on a ship to Constantinople, St. Theodore besought the Lord that water drawn from the sea be made fresh to quench the thirst of his companions.

To those thanking him for this the monk said that God had worked such a miracle out of pity for the intense thirst of mankind...

Saint Theodore the Wonderworker and Hermit of the Jordan is commemorated on 5 June by the Eastern Orthodox and Byzantine Catholic Churches.

== See also ==
- Christian monasticism
- Desert Fathers
- Poustinia
