= Illidius =

French saint and bishop

Saint Illidius
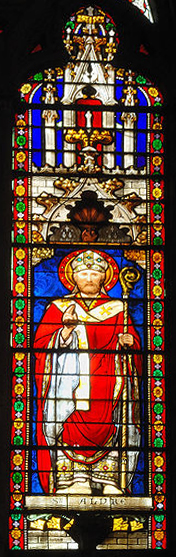
- Stained glass depiction of Illidius. Église Saint-Eutrope, Clermont-Ferrand.

Bishop
- Died: 385; Clermont-Ferrand
- Venerated in: Roman Catholic Church
- Major shrine: Abbaye Saint Allyre, near Clermont
- Feast: July 7; June 5 (locally at Clermont-Ferrand)
- Patronage: Clermont-Ferrand

Saint Illidius (French: Saint Allyre, Alyre; (Note: also known as Allirol, Allirand, Allirot, Illide, Illidio) died 385) was a 4th-century bishop of Clermont, France. To Illidius is attributed the rise of Clermont-Ferrand as a center of religious teaching and culture.

Gregory of Tours mentions Illidius in his work. Illidius is credited with having cured the daughter of the Roman Emperor Magnus Maximus at Trier, and died on the return journey.

His tomb attracted many pilgrims.

The fountain of St. Allyre at Clermont is known for its petrifying water, caused by calcareous deposits.

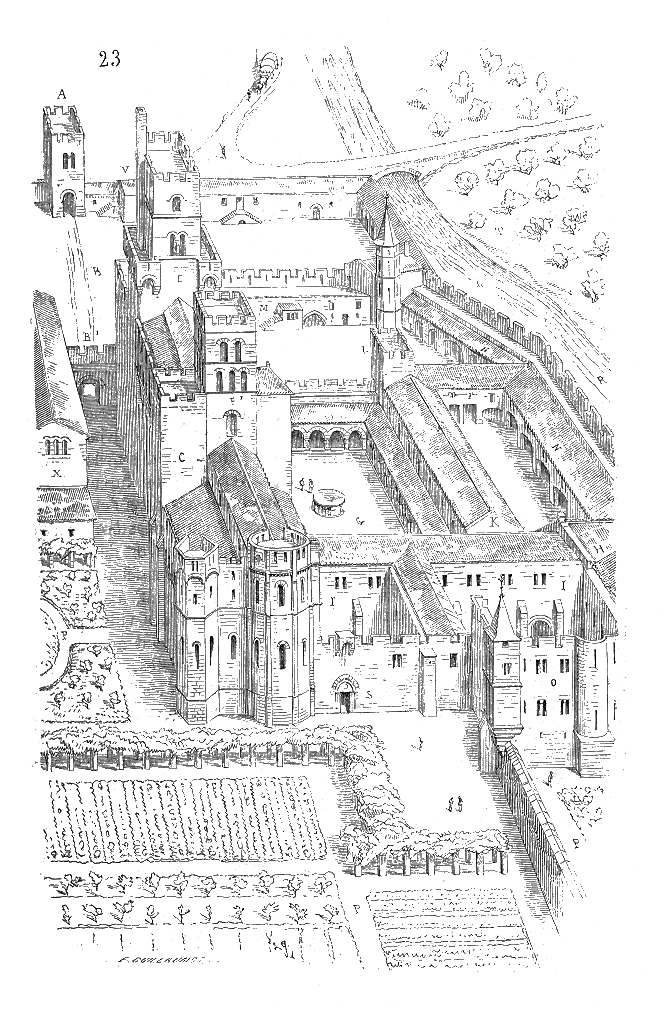
Abbaye Saint Allyre, Clermont.
