= Niculițel =

- Commune
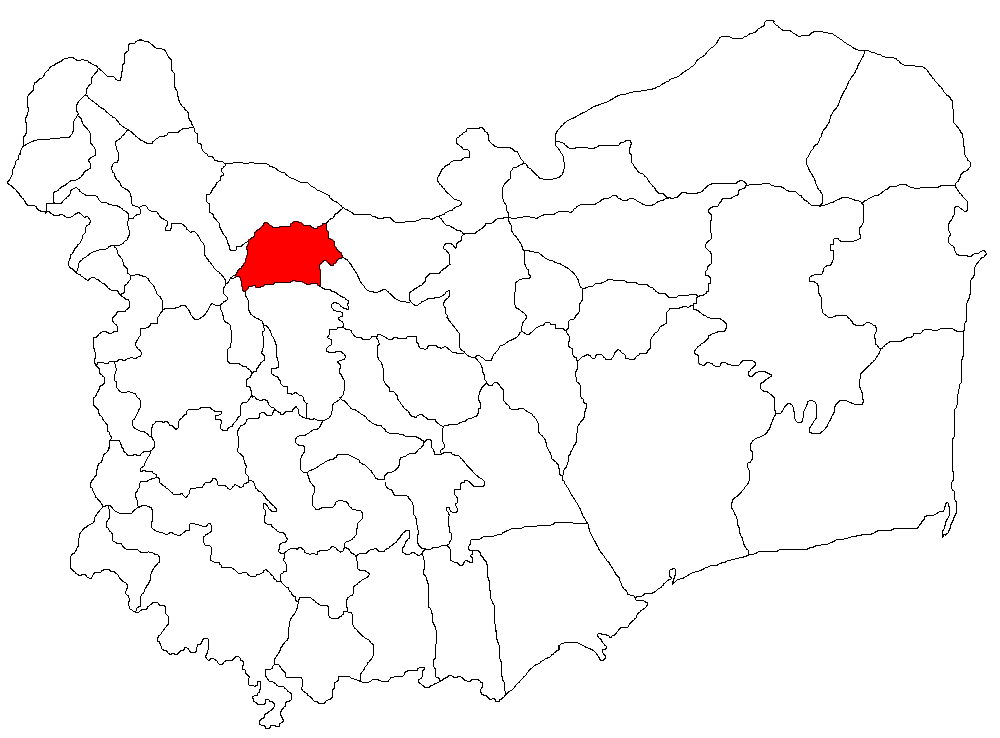
- Location in Tulcea County

- Location in Romania
- Coordinates: 45°11′N 28°29′E
- Country: Romania
- County: Tulcea

Government
  - Mayor (2020–2024): Florin Sechila (PSD)
- Area: 93.67 km^{2} (36.17 sq mi)
- Population (2021-12-01): 3,774
  - Density: 40.29/km^{2} (104.4/sq mi)
- Time zone: UTC+02:00 (EET)
  - Summer (DST): UTC+03:00 (EEST)
- Postal code: 827165
- Vehicle reg.: TL
- Website: www.primaria-niculitel.ro

Niculițel is a commune in Tulcea County, Northern Dobruja, Romania. It is composed of a single village, Niculițel.

A paleo-Christian basilica dated from the end of the 4th century to the 6th century was discovered in Niculițel in the spot named "La Plăcintă". Coins from between 330 and 354 were discovered, as were 5th-century modifications to the basilica. While a specific end date for the use of the basilica could not be determined, a couple of 10th-century submerged dwellings were discovered as having been dug in the NV corner of the nave, which suggests that the basilica was in disrepair by the 10th century. Under the altar there is a crypt which housed the bones of the martyrs whose names were written on the sidewalls.

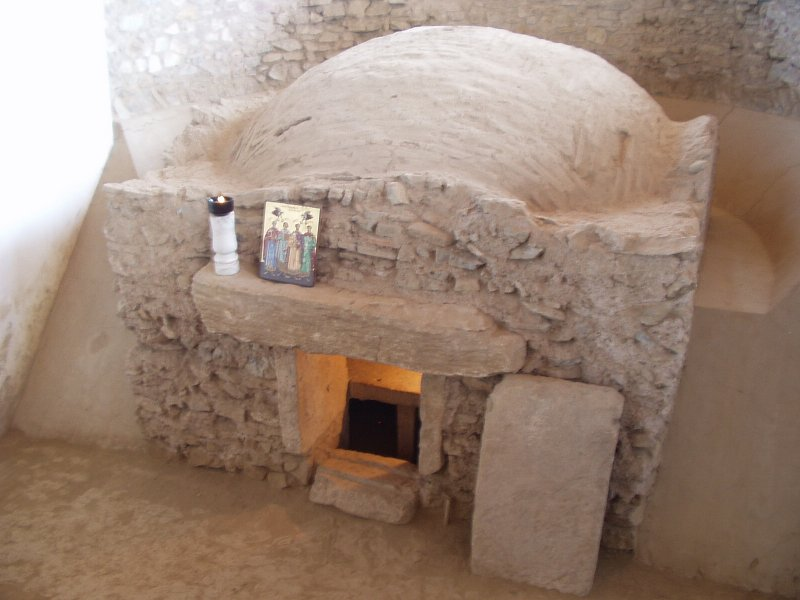
Tomb of martyrs in the paleo-Christian basilica
