= May 23 (Eastern Orthodox liturgics) =

Day in the Eastern Orthodox liturgical calendar

Eastern Orthodox liturgical calendar
May 22	May 23	May 24
May 23 O.S. ≍ June 5 N.S. May 23 N.S ≍ May 10 O.S.

An Eastern Orthodox cross

May 23 in Eastern Orthodox liturgical calendars is a feast day and a day of commemoration of saints and martyrs. Although some Orthodox churches use the Revised Julian Calendar and others use the traditional Julian calendar, the fixed commemorations for their respective May 23 are broadly the same, no matter which calendar is used. (Note: Despite the dates being the same, the days to which they refer typically differ by 13 days. The notation Old Style or O.S. is sometimes used to indicate a date in the traditional Julian Calendar (the "Old Calendar"). The notation New Style or N.S. indicates a date in the Revised Julian calendar (the "New Calendar").)

== Saints ==
- Holy Myrrhbearer Mary of Clopas, aunt of Jesus (1st century)
- Saint Manahen (Manaen), prophet and teacher of the Church of Antioch (Acts 13:1) (1st century)
- Martyr Seleucius (Selefkos), by sawing in two.
- Martyr Salonas the Roman, by the sword.
- Saint Synesius, Bishop of Karpasia (Carpasia) on Cyprus (c. 5th century) (Note: "A local saint on Cyprus, not mentioned in the synaxaria. He was the successor of St. Philon (January 24).")
- Saint Michael the Confessor, Bishop of Synnada in Phrygia Salutaris (826) (Note: A close friend of Saint Tarasios of Constantinople, venerated together with him and depicted on the miraculous icon of the Theotokos “Economissa” of Mount Athos which was popular among the Cossacks who became monastics there.)
- Hieromartyr Michael "the black-robed", monk of St. Sabbas Monastery (9th century)

== Pre-Schism Western saints ==
- Hieromartyrs Epitacius, first Bishop of Tui in Galicia (Spain); and Basileus, second Bishop of Braga in Portugal c. 60-95 (1st century)
- Saint Euphebius, Bishop of Naples in Italy.
- Martyrs Donatianus and Rogatianus of Nantes, brothers (c. 284-305) (Note: In the late 5th century AD the Christians built a church on the site of the burial ground of the martyrs; and in 1145 AD the holy relics of the martyrs were translated to the cathedral of Nantes ("Église Saint-Donatien et Saint-Rogatien").) (see also: May 24)
- Saint Merculialis of Forli (Mercurialis), Bishop of Forlì, zealous opponent of paganism and Arianism (406)
- Saint Desiderius of Langres (Didier II), Bishop of Langres in Gaul (407) (Note: The Great Synaxaristes records that St. Desiderius reposed in peace. However, the Roman Martyrlogy notes that he was martyred after visiting the king to offer entreaties on behalf of his people who were mistreated by the Vandal army.)
- Martyrs Quintianus, Lucius and Julianus, with 19 other Christians in North Africa during the persecution of the Arian Vandals (430)
- Saint Patricius (Patrice), Bishop of Bayeux in Normandy 464-469 AD (469) (see also: May 24)
- Saints Eutychius and Florentius, two monks who governed a monastery in Valcastoria near Nursia, Italy (540) (Note: Saint Gregory the Great praised their virtues and miracles.)
- Saint Goban (Gobhnena), Abbot of the monastery of Old Leighlin, from where he went to Tascaffin in Co. Limerick, Ireland (6th-7th century)
- Hieromartyr Desiderius, Bishop of Vienne (608) (Note: Crowned with martyrdom by being stoned at the order of King Theuderic II of Burgundy.)
- Saint Syagrius (Siacre) of Nice, a monk at Lérins Abbey, who later founded the monastery of St Pons, at Cimiez, then becoming Bishop of Nice 777-787 (787) (Note: Saint Syagrius was a relative of Charlemagne. When Charlemagne visited Cimiez, which had been devastated by the Lombards in 574, he caused St. Syagrius to build the monastery of St. Pontius on its ruins, the largest Alpine abbey of the Middle Ages.)
- Saint Guibertus of Gorze (Wicbert), a hermit on his own estate of Gembloux in Brabant, Belgium, who retired to the monastery of Gorze in France (962)

== Post-Schism Orthodox saints ==
- Saint Damian (King Demetrius of Georgia (1125-1156), Damianos in monasticm), Hymnographer (1156)
- Saint Simon, Bishop of Suzdal (c. early 12th century)
- Saint Euphrosyne of Polotsk, Princess (1173) (Note: A descendant of St Volodymyr the Great, St Euphrosynia led a very holy life, dying while in Jerusalem on pilgrimage. Her relics were enshrined in the Kyiv Caves where they were later taken to her native Belarus – a portion of her relics remained in the Kyiv Caves however. Her two-bar blessing Cross has become the national Cross of Belarus.)
- Saint Ioannicius I, Metropolitan of Peć and Archbishop of Serbia 1272-1276 AD (1279)
- Saint Anthony, Bishop of Rostov (1336)
- Saint Cyril, Bishop of Rostov (1384)
- Saint Paisius of Galich, abbot (1460)
- Saints Adrian and Bogolep of Uglich, monks of St. Paisius of Uglich Monastery (late 15th century) (Note: Two disciples of Paisius of Uglich who helped him to spread devotion to The Protection of the Mother of God, which devotion had come to Paisius and Adrian in a vision of the Theotokos around 1472 AD. The Monk Bogolep is commemorated on August 22.)
- Saints Anthony and Joannicius of Zaonikiev Monastery (Vologda) (16th century)
- Saint Dorotheus of Pskov Lavra, monk and hermit (1622) and Monk Hilarion of the Dormition of the Theotokos monastery near Podolsk (17th-18th century) (see also: May 12)
- Saint Alexander, Bishop and Wonderworker of Pereiaslav (17th century)
- Saint Joachim, monk of St. Nicholas monastery of Shartoma (17th century)
- Synaxis of All Saints of Rostov and Yaroslavl (established March 10, 1964): (Note: See: (in Russian) Собор Ростово-Ярославских святых. Википедии. (Russian Wikipedia).)

- Rostov Wonderworkers: Bishop Leontius (1073); Archimandrite Abraham the wonderworker (1073-1077); Bishop Isaiah, wonderworker (1090); Prince Basil (1238); Bishop Ignatius (1288); Peter, Tsarevich of Ordynsk (1290); Bishop James (1391); Archbishop Theodore (1394); Blessed Isidore, Fool-for-Christ (1474); Blessed John of the Hair-Shirt (the Merciful), Fool-for-Christ (1580); Monk Irenarchus the Hermit (1616); Metropolitan Demetrius (1709);
- Yaroslav Wonderworkers: Princes Basil (1249); Constantine (1257); Theodore (1299) and his sons David (1321) and Constantine (XIV);
- Pereslavl Wonderworkers: Monk Nikita the Stylite (1186); Prince Alexander Nevsky (1263); Prince Andrew of Smolensk (15th century); Monk Daniel the Archimandrite (1540);
- Uglich Wonderworkers: Prince Roman (1285); Monk Paisius (1504); Monk Cassian (1504); Monk Ignatius of Lomsk (1591); Tsarevich Demetrius (1591);
- Poshekhonsk Wonderworkers: Monk Sylvester of Obnora (1379); Monk Sebastian (1542); Hieromartyr Adrian (1550); Monk Gennadius of Liubimograd and Kostroma (1565).

- Saint John (Alexeev) of Valaam and New Valamo, Finland, Schema-Abbot (1958)
- Saint Eumenius (Saridakis) the Leper, of Crete (Eumenius the Younger), the God-bearer, father confessor to the Athens leprosy hospital (1999) (Note: He was formally glorified by the Ecumenical Patriarchate on April 14, 2022. The official communiqué of the Ecumenical Patriarchate was as follows: (in Greek) "Συνῆλθε σήμερον, 14ην τ.μ. Ἀπριλίου 2022, ἡ Ἁγία καί Ἱερά Σύνοδος εἰς τήν τακτικήν συνεδρίαν τοῦ μηνός Ἀπριλίου, ὑπό τήν προεδρίαν τῆς Α. Θ. Παναγιότητος, καθ᾿ ἥν: α) εἰσηγήσει τῆς Κανονικῆς Ἐπιτροπῆς, προέβη ὁμοφώνως εἰς τήν ἀναγραφήν εἰς τό Ἁγιολόγιον τῆς κατ᾿ Ἀνατολάς Ὀρθοδόξου Ἐκκλησίας τοῦ Ὁσίου καί Θεοφόρου Πατρός ἡμῶν Εὐμενίου τοῦ νέου (Σαριδάκη).") (Note: See: (in Greek) Όσιος Ευμένιος Σαριδάκης ο Λεπρός. Βικιπαίδεια. (Greek Wikipedia).) (see also: May 10 - OS)

== Other commemorations ==
- Icon of the Theotokos 'Thou Art the True Vine' .
- Uncovering of the relics (1164) of St. Leontius, Bishop and Wonderworker of Rostov (1073) (Note: See: (in Russian) Леонтий Ростовский. Википедии. (Russian Wikipedia).)
- Uncovering of the relics (1210) of St. Abramius of Rostov, Archimandrite, (1077)
- Translation of the holy relics (1992) of Saint Joachim of Ithaca (1868) (see also: March 2)
- Uncovering of the relics (2001) of new martyrs Evdokia Sheykovoy, Daria Timaginoy, Daria Ulybina, and Maria (1919) (Note: The celebration was included in the calendar with the blessing of His Holiness Patriarch Kirill on November 28, 2011.) (Note: See: (in Russian) Шейкова, Евдокия Александровна. Википедии. (Russian Wikipedia).)
- Repose of Hieromonk Damascene of Valaam (1825)
- Repose of Hieroschemamonk Meletius of Svir, disciple of Elder Theodore of Svir (1877)
- Repose of Nun Euphrosyne, disciple of St. Barsanuphius of Optina (1934)

== Icon gallery ==
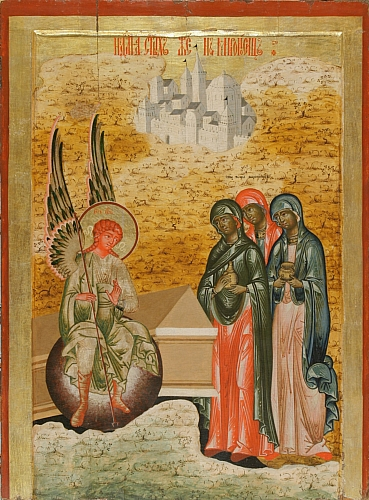
Icon of the Myrrhbearing Women (The Three Marys, including Mary of Clopas) at the Tomb of Christ (Kizhi, Russia, 18th century).

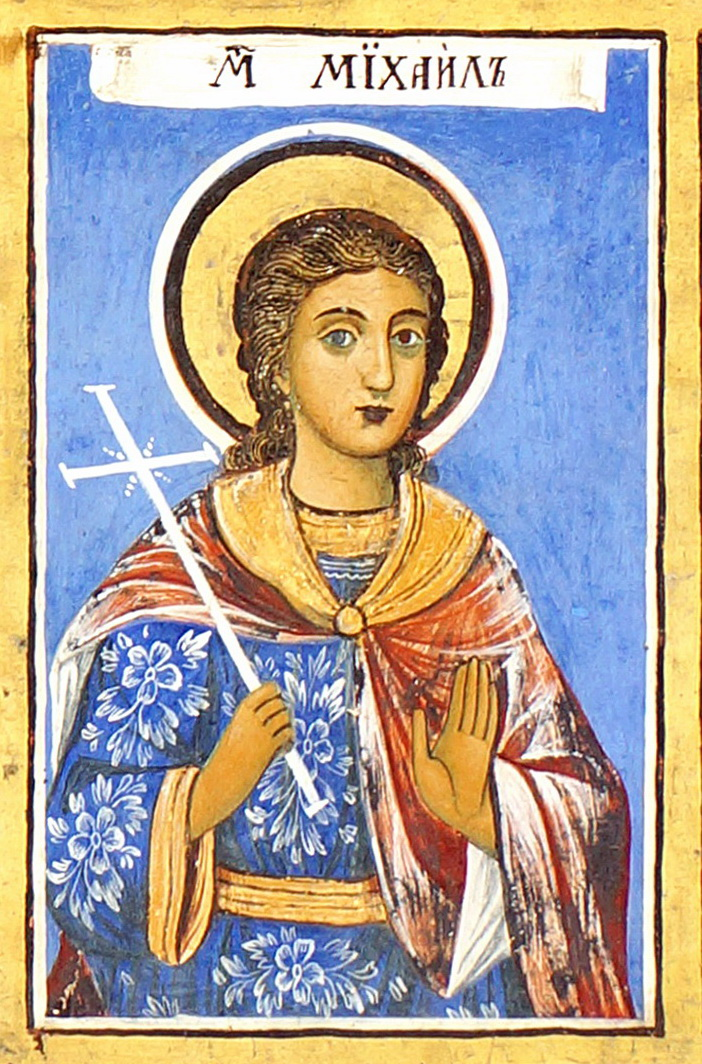
St. Michael the Confessor, Bishop of Synnada.

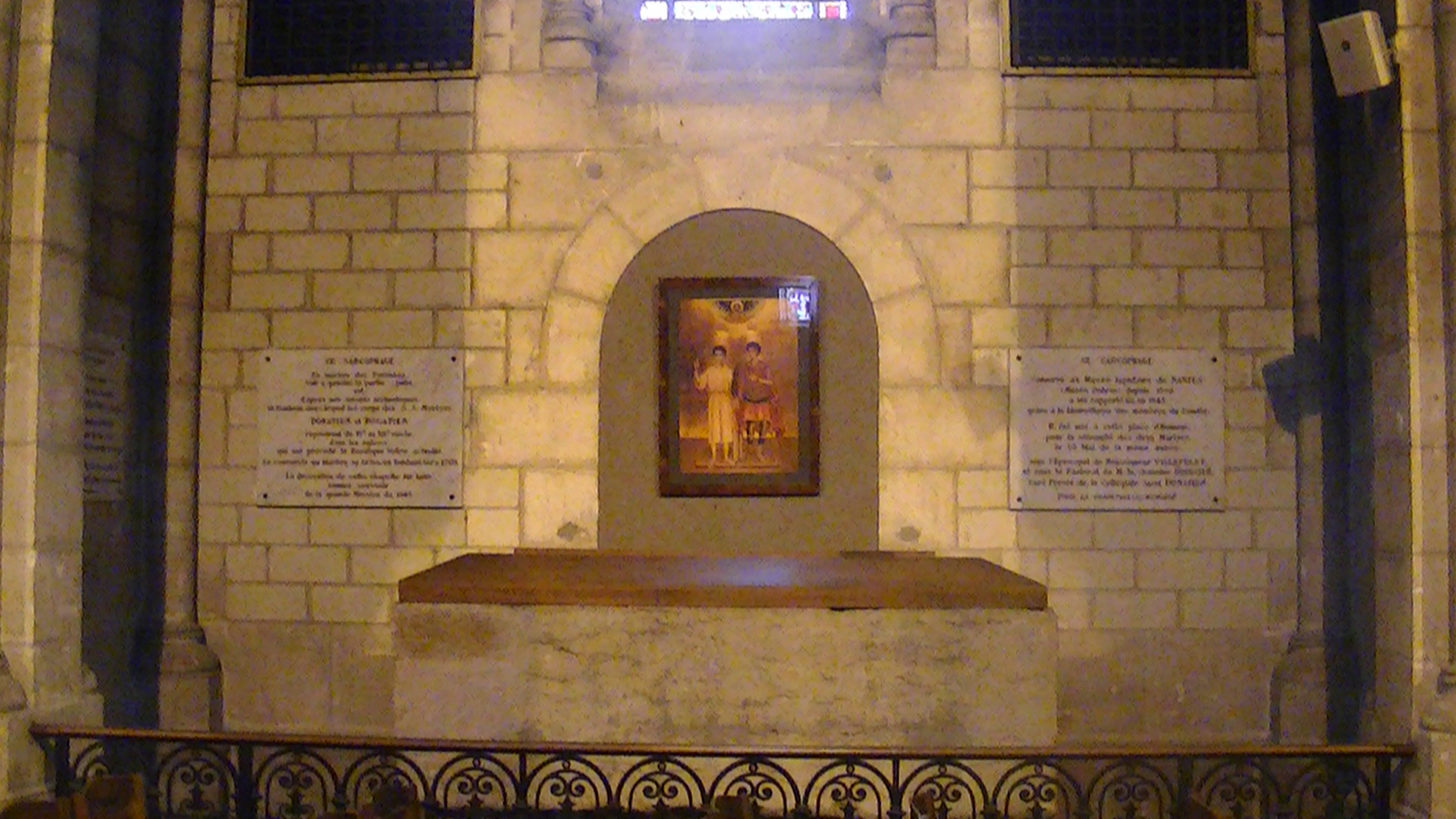
Tomb of Sts. Donatian and Rogatian in the Basilica of Sts. Donatian and Rogatian. The tomb is empty, as the relics were transferred to Ostia in the 12th century.

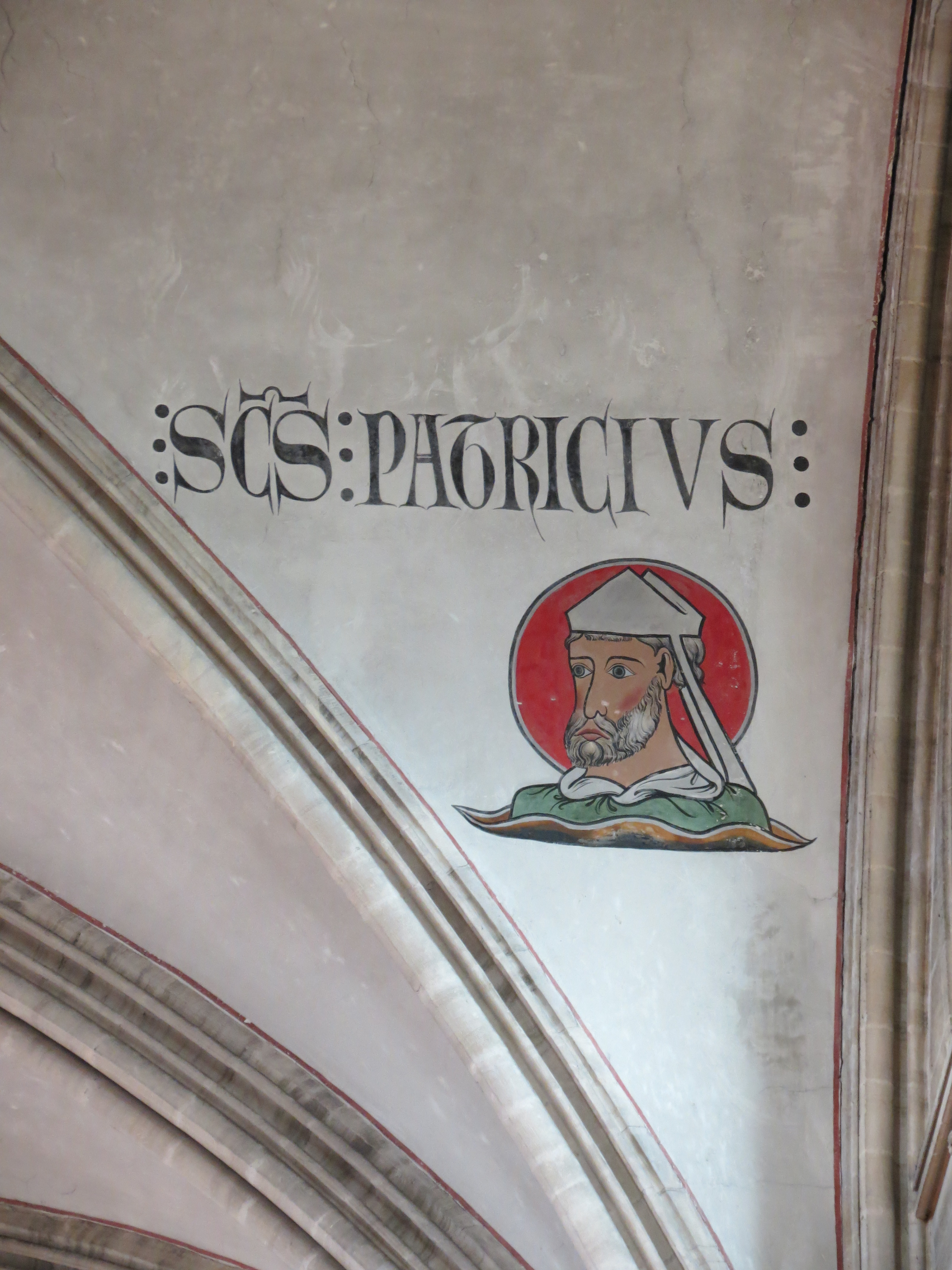
Saint Patricius (Patrice), Bishop of Bayeux.

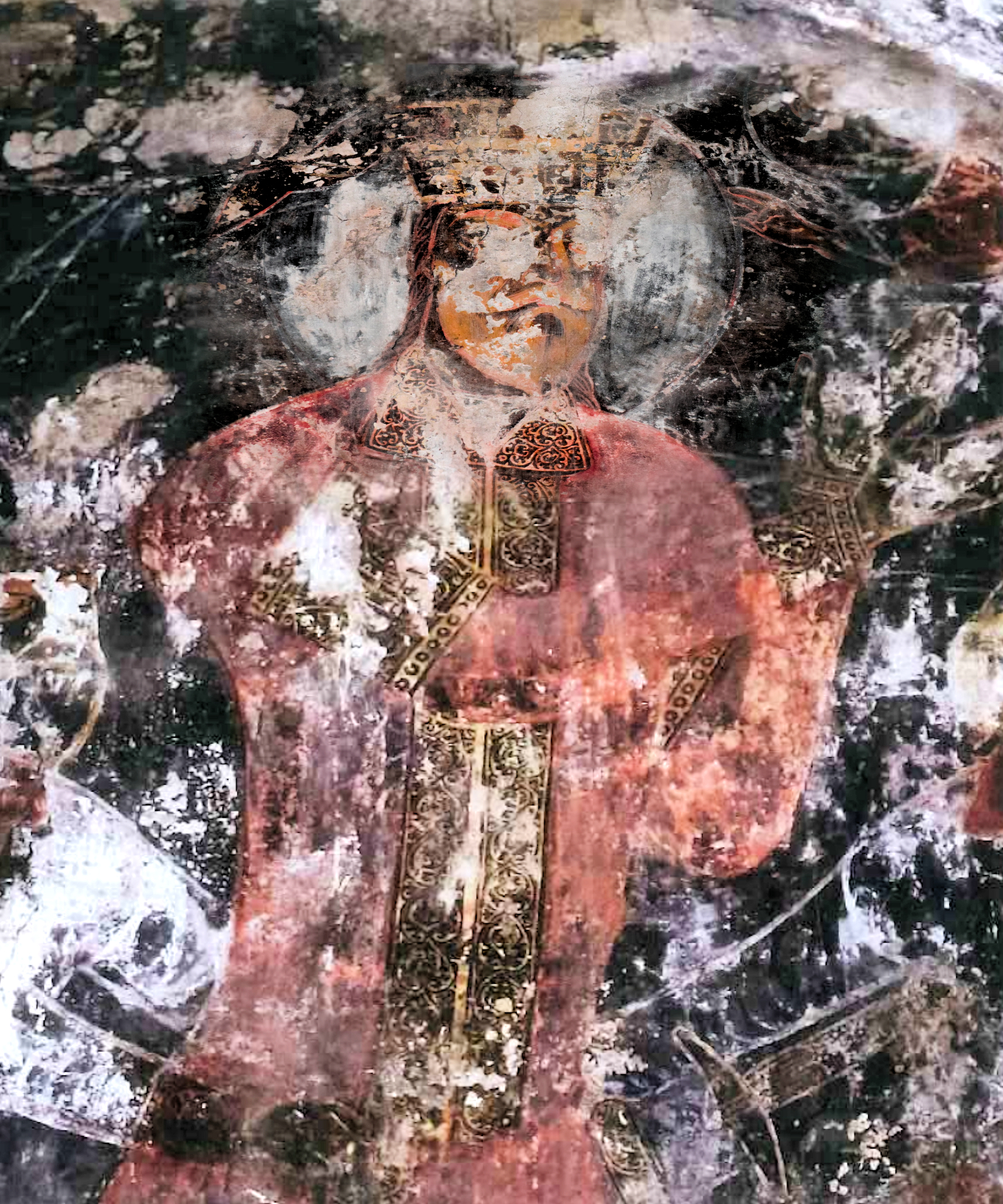
St. Demetrius I of Georgia, known as Damian after tonsure.

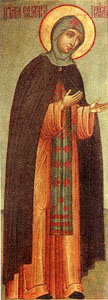
St. Euphrosyne of Polatsk.

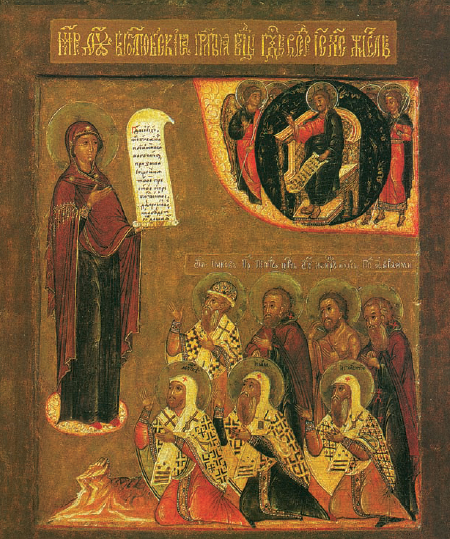
Rostov saints in front of the Mother of God.

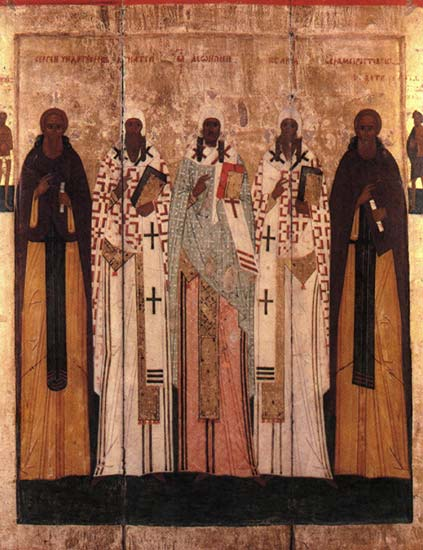
Rostov Wonderworkers: Sts. Abraham, Isaiah, Leontiy and Ignatiy of Rostov with Sergius of Radonezh.

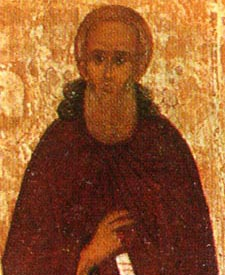
Rostov Wonderworkers: St. Abraham of Rostov.

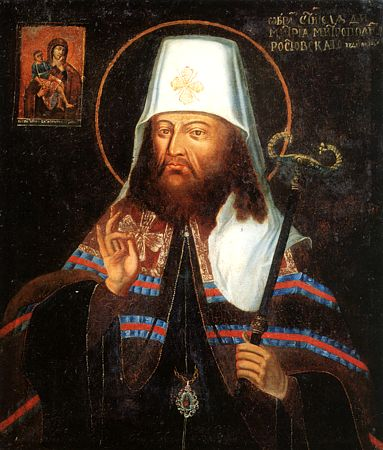
Rostov Wonderworkers: St. Dimitry of Rostov.

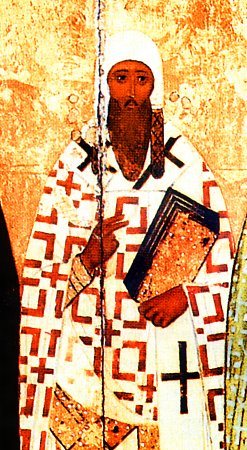
Rostov Wonderworkers: St. Ignatius of Rostov.

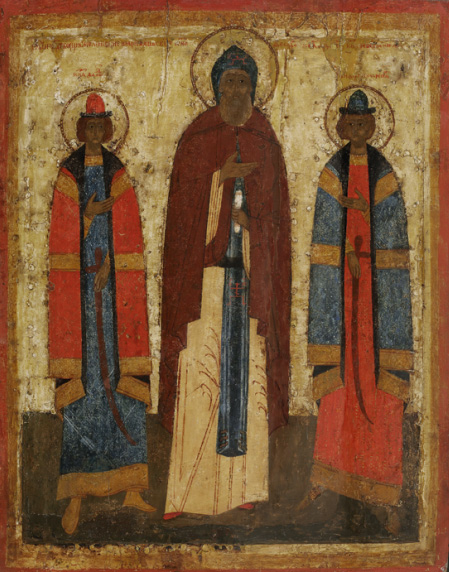
Yaroslav Wonderworkers: Sts. David, Theodore and Constantine of Yaroslavl (15th century).

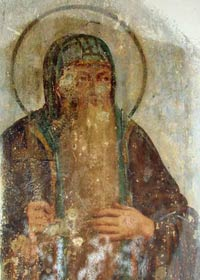
Pereslavl Wonderworkers: Monk Nikita the Stylite.

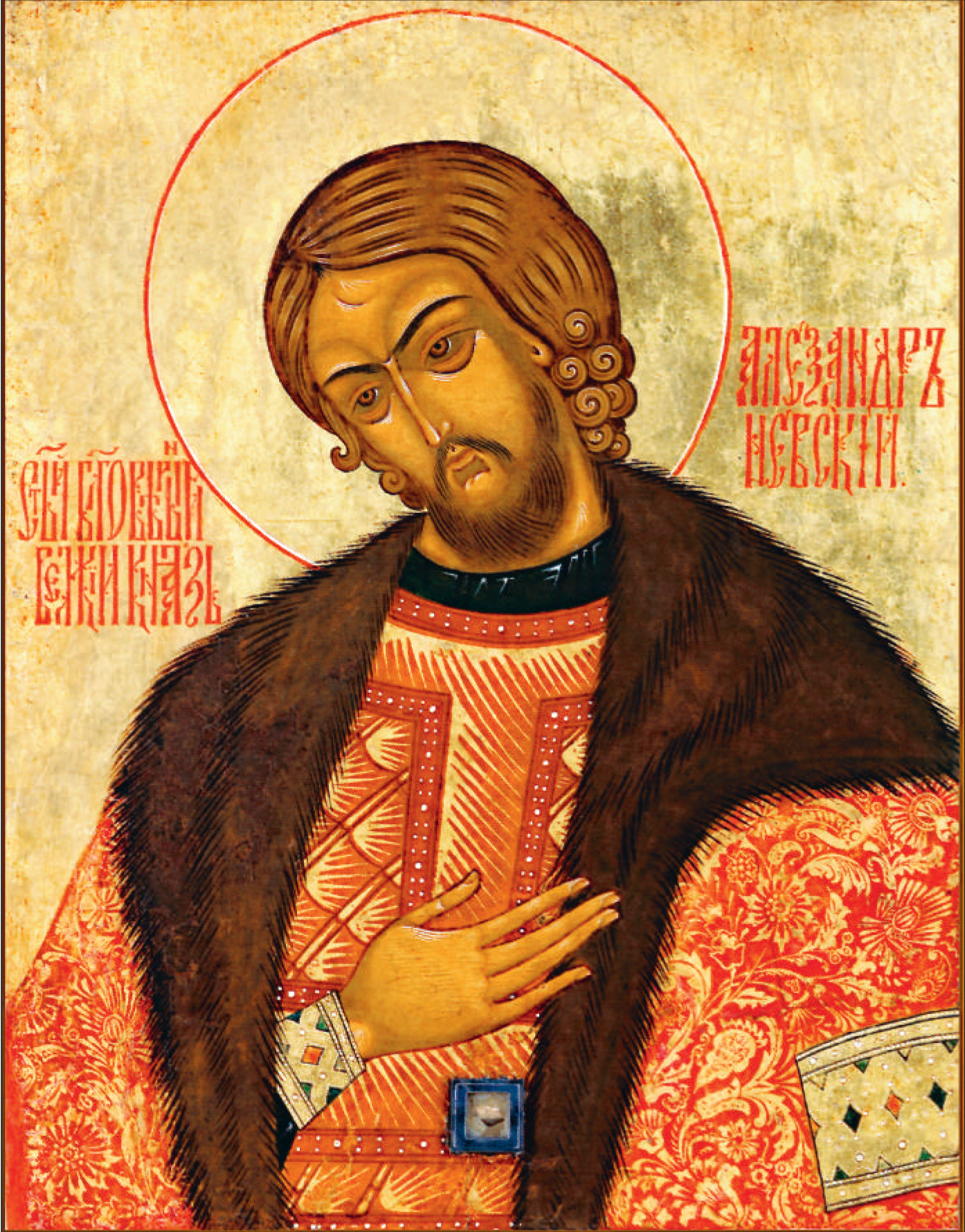
Pereslavl Wonderworkers: St. Alexander Nevsky.

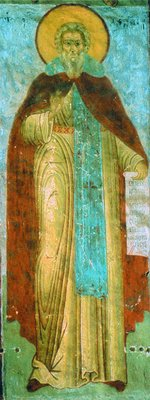
Pereslavl Wonderworkers: Monk Daniel the Archimandrite (1668).

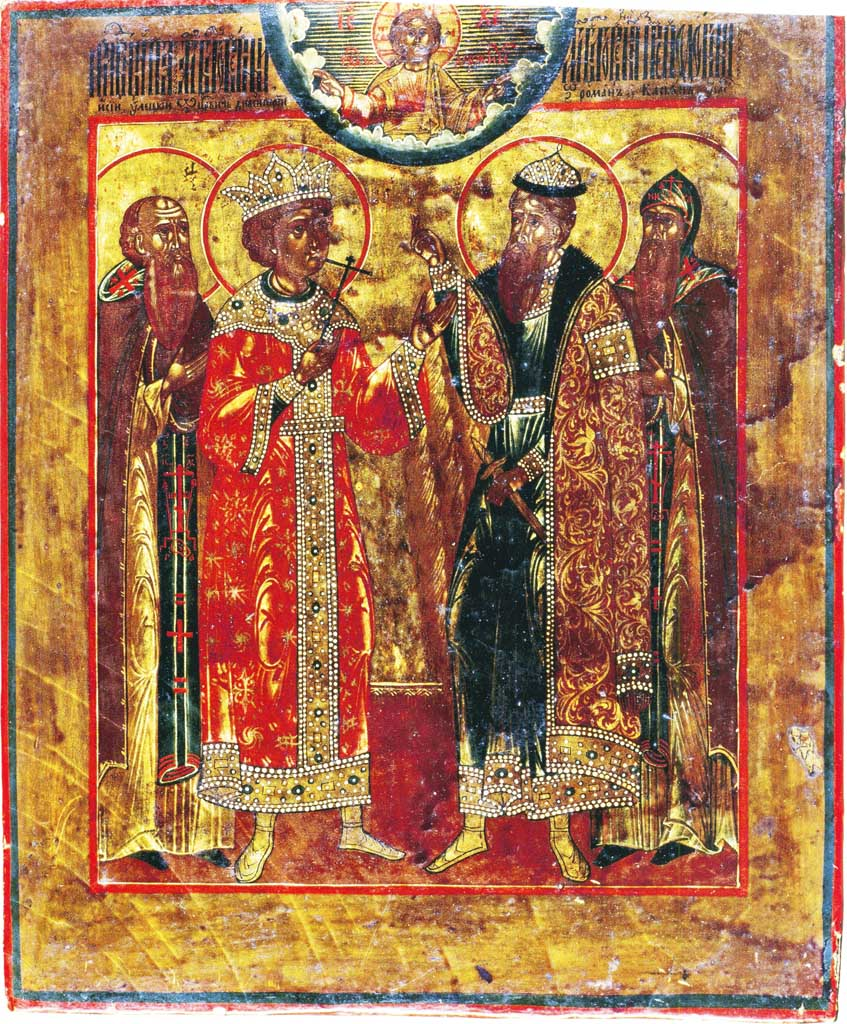
Uglich saints: Paisius of Uglich, Tsarevich Dimitri, Prince Roman, Cassian of Uchem.

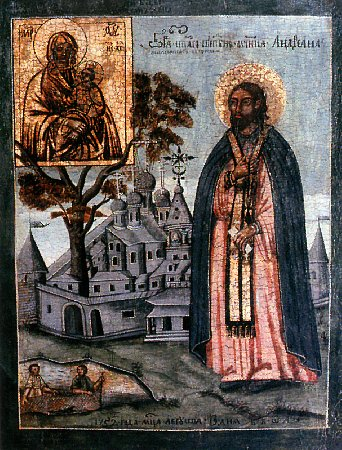
Poshekhonsk Wonderworkers: St. Adrian of Poshekhonye.

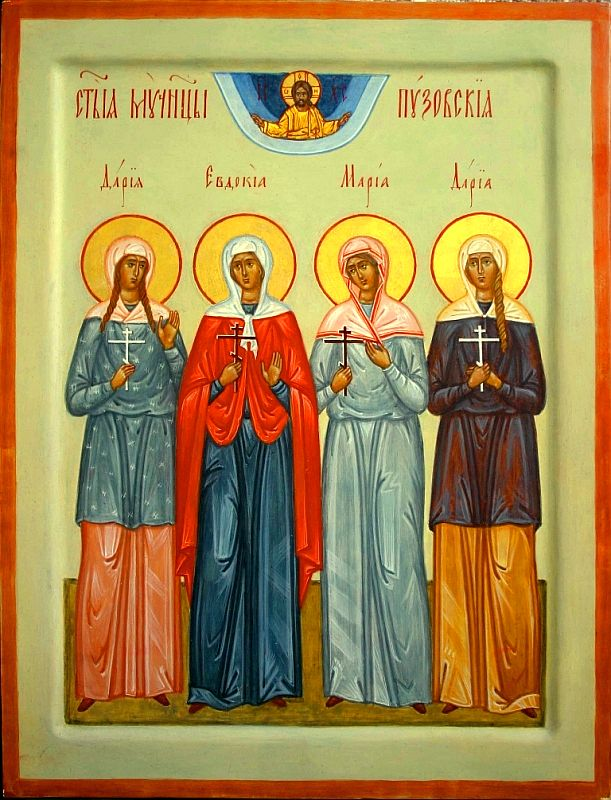
New martyrs Evdokia Sheykovoy, Daria Timaginoy, Daria Ulybina, and Mary Neizvestnaya.

== Sources ==
- May 23/June 5. Orthodox Calendar (ORTHOCHRISTIAN.COM).
- June 5/May 23. HOLY TRINITY RUSSIAN ORTHODOX CHURCH (A parish of the Patriarchate of Moscow).
- May 23. OCA - Lives of the Saints.
- May 23. Latin Saints of the Orthodox Patriarchate of Rome.
- May 23. The Roman Martyrology.

Greek Sources

- Great Synaxaristes: (in Greek) 23 ΜΑΪΟΥ. ΜΕΓΑΣ ΣΥΝΑΞΑΡΙΣΤΗΣ.
- (in Greek) Συναξαριστής. 23 Μαΐου. ECCLESIA.GR. (H ΕΚΚΛΗΣΙΑ ΤΗΣ ΕΛΛΑΔΟΣ).

Russian Sources

- (in Russian) 5 июня (23 мая). Православная Энциклопедия под редакцией Патриарха Московского и всея Руси Кирилла (электронная версия). (Orthodox Encyclopedia - Pravenc.ru).
- (in Russian) 23 мая (ст.ст.) 5 июня 2013 (нов. ст.). Русская Православная Церковь Отдел внешних церковных связей. (DECR).
