= May 10 (Eastern Orthodox liturgics) =

Day in the Eastern Orthodox liturgical calendar

Eastern Orthodox liturgical calendar
May 9	May 10	May 11
May 10 O.S. ≍ May 23 N.S. May 10 N.S ≍ April 27 O.S.

An Eastern Orthodox cross

May 10 in Eastern Orthodox liturgical calendars is a feast day and a day of commemoration of saints and martyrs. Although some Orthodox churches use the Revised Julian Calendar and others use the traditional Julian calendar, the fixed commemorations for their respective May 10 are broadly the same, no matter which calendar is used. (Note: Despite the dates being the same, the days to which they refer typically differ by 13 days. The notation Old Style or O.S. is sometimes used to indicate a date in the traditional Julian Calendar (the "Old Calendar"). The notation New Style or N.S. indicates a date in the Revised Julian calendar (the "New Calendar").)

== Saints ==
- Saint Simon the Zealot, Apostle (1st century)
- Martyr Hesychius the Palatine of Antioch (c. 304)
- Saint Isidora the Fool-for-Christ, of Tabennisi, Egypt (c. 365)
- Saint Isidore of Alexandria (Isidore The Simple-Minded) (319-404), (404)
- Venerable Passarion the Presbyter (Passarion of Palestine), Agapius and Philemon (mid-5th century) (Note: Passarion was a famous acetic of Palestine, a contemporary of Patriarch Juvenal of Jerusalem (420-458), and served as the teacher of Saint Euthymius the Great. Cyril of Scythopolis (525-558) tells that Passarion died seven months after the dedication of the church of the Lavra of St. Euthymius. This dedication was on March 7, 428. The death of Passarion was at the end of October, 428. The Palestinian-Georgian calendar has the feast of Passarion on June 7. There is also a "Passarion (Ascetic)" listed on August 11.)
- Blessed Thais (Taisia) of Egypt (5th century) (Note: Not to be confused with Venerable Thaïs of Egypt (October 8).)
- Saint Laurence of Egypt, monk, of Egypt (6th century)

== Pre-Schism Western saints ==
- Martyrs Calepodius, Palmatius, Simplicius, Felix, Blanda and Companions (c. 222–232)
- Martyrs Alphius, Philadelphus, Cyprian, at Lentini in Sicily (251)
- Martyrs Erasmus, Onesimus, and 14 other martyrs, in Sicily (251)
- Saint Aurelian of Limoges, Disciple of St Martial of Limoges in France (3rd century)
- Martyrs Quartus and Quintus, two citizens of Capua who were condemned and executed in Rome.
- Saint Conleth, hermit and first Bishop of Kildare (c. 519) (see also: May 3 and May 4)
- Saint Comgall, founder and abbot of Bangor (602)of Egypt
- Saint Cataldus, born in Munster in Ireland, became a monk at Lismore, then Bishop of Taranto; renowned for miracles (7th century)
- Virgin-martyr Solangia (Solange) (880)

== Post-Schism Orthodox saints ==
- Saint Simon of Vladimir and Suzdal, Kiev Caves, Bishop (1226) (Note: See: (in Russian) Симон (епископ Владимирский). Википедии. (Russian Wikipedia).)
- Venerable Laurence, monastic founder at Mt. Pelion in Volos (late 14th century)
- Blessed Simon of Yurievets and Zharki, Fool-for-Christ (1584) (Note: See: (in Russian) Симон Блаженный. Википедии. (Russian Wikipedia).)
- Martyr Eustathios of Crimea (1745-1759), martyred in Theodosia, Crimea (1759)
- Saint Synesius of Irkutsk (1787) (Note: Associate and close friend of St Sophronius, Bishop of Irkutsk (March 30).)
- Saint Yoakim Krchovski (1820)
- Venerable Calistrat (Bobu) of Timișeni and Vasiova, Confessor at Timișeni Monastery and Vasiova Monastery (1975) (Note: See: (in Romanian) Calistrat Bobu. Wikipedia. (Romanian Wikipedia).)
- Saint Eumenius (Saridakis) the Leper, of Crete (Eumenius the Younger), the God-bearer, father confessor to the Athens leprosy hospital (1999) (Note: See: (in Greek) Όσιος Ευμένιος Σαριδάκης ο Λεπρός. Βικιπαίδεια. (Greek Wikipedia).) (see also: May 23 - NS)

== Other commemorations ==
- The passage of the relics (1087) of St. Nicholas the Wonderworker through the island of Zakynthos, while on their way to Bari.
- Translation of the relics (1670) of the blessed martyr Basil of Mangazea in Siberia (1602)
- "Kiev-Bratskaya" Icon of the Mother of God (1654) (Note: The "Kiev-Bratskaya" Icon of the Mother of God miraculously appeared in the Church of Sts. Boris and Gleb in 1654 in the town of Vishgorod (Kiev Province). In 1662, during Russia's war with Poland (1659 - 1667), the town suffered greatly at the hands of Crimean Tatars allied with the Poles. The Church of the Holy Passion-bearers Boris and Gleb was brought to ruin, and was desecrated. However, by God's Providence the miraculous Icon of the Mother of God and the relics of Sts. Boris and Gleb were spared; the Icon had been timely removed from the church and sent down the Dniepr River, and the relics of the saints had been hidden. The Icon was carried by the river current to the banks of Podol in Kiev, where it was joyously received by the Orthodox and with due honor was taken to the Bratsk Monastery. There it remained over the course of many years. A survey of the Kiev-Bratsk Monastery church property compiled in 1807 included a description of the Icon. There was a "Song of the Miraculous Kiev-Bratskaya Icon of the Mother of God," composed shortly after 1692. The Kiev-Bratskaya Icon of the Mother of God is celebrated on three days each year: September 6, May 10, and June 2. They are all dedicated to the miraculous appearance of the Holy Icon in 1654. The original Icon is no longer extant. A copy exists in the Kiev Monastery of the Protection of the Mother of God.)
- Repose of Eldress Thaisia of Voronezh (1840)
- Repose of Hieromonk Andrew (Abramius in Schema) of Whitehoof Convent (1902)
- Slaying of Soldier Eugene Rodionov in Chechnya (May 23, 1996)

== Icon gallery ==
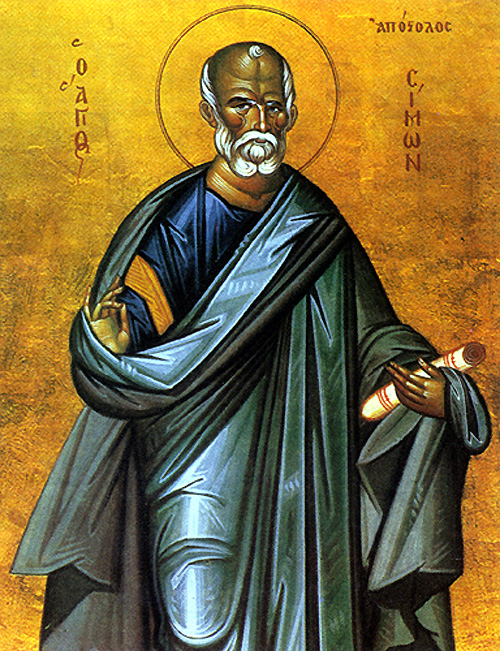
Icon of St. Simon the Zealot.

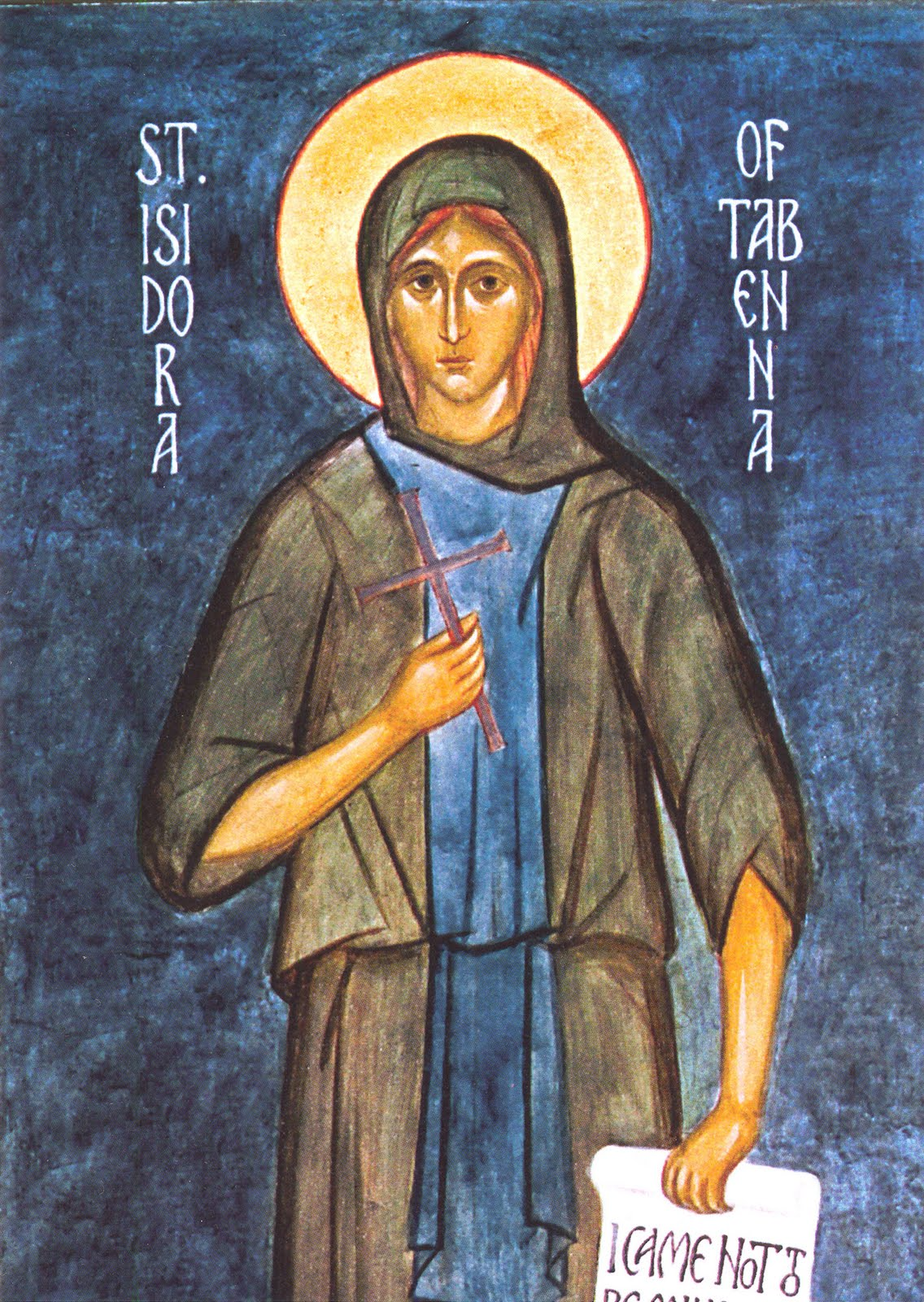
St. Isidora the Fool-for-Christ, of Tabennisi.

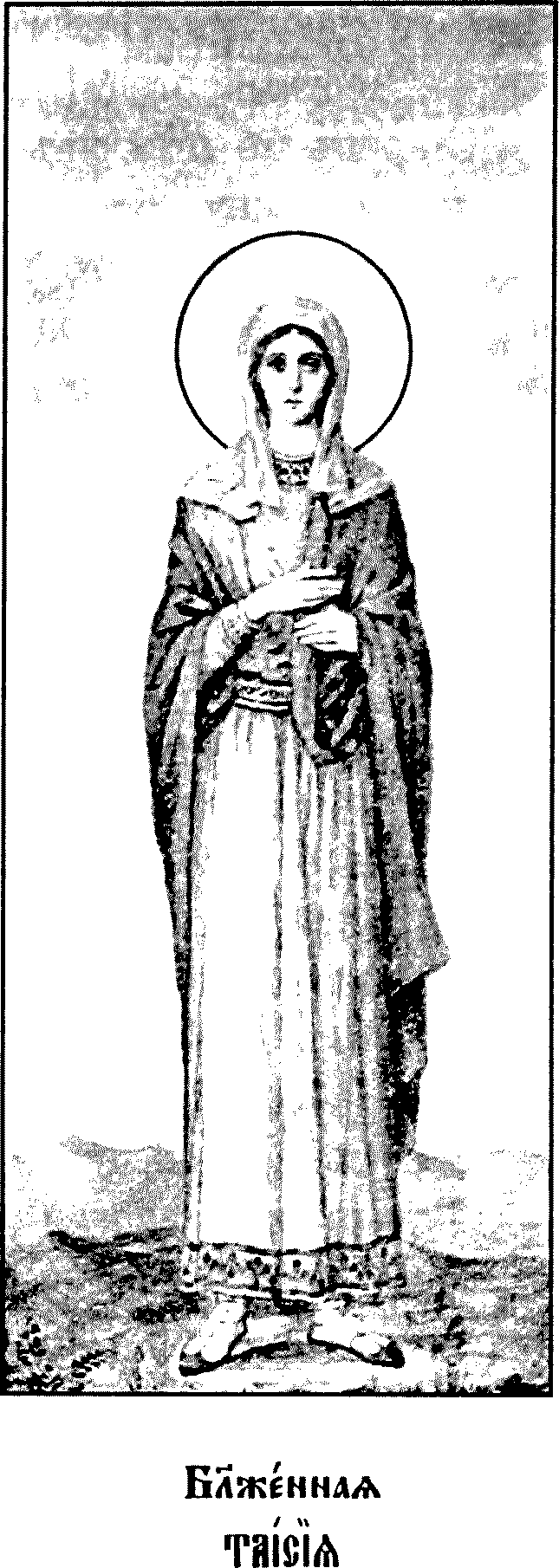
Blessed Thais of Egypt.

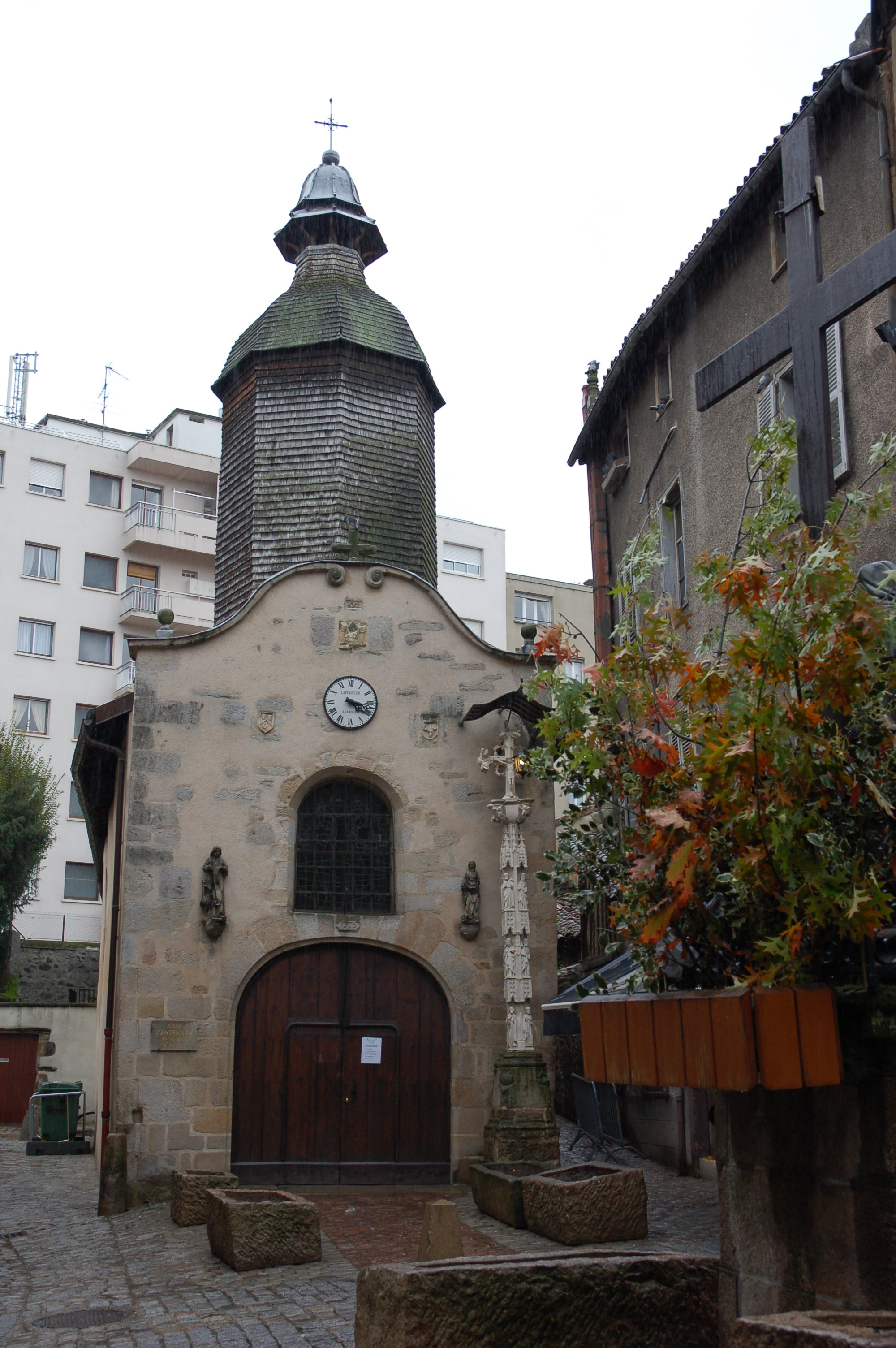
Chapel of St. Aurelian, Limoges.

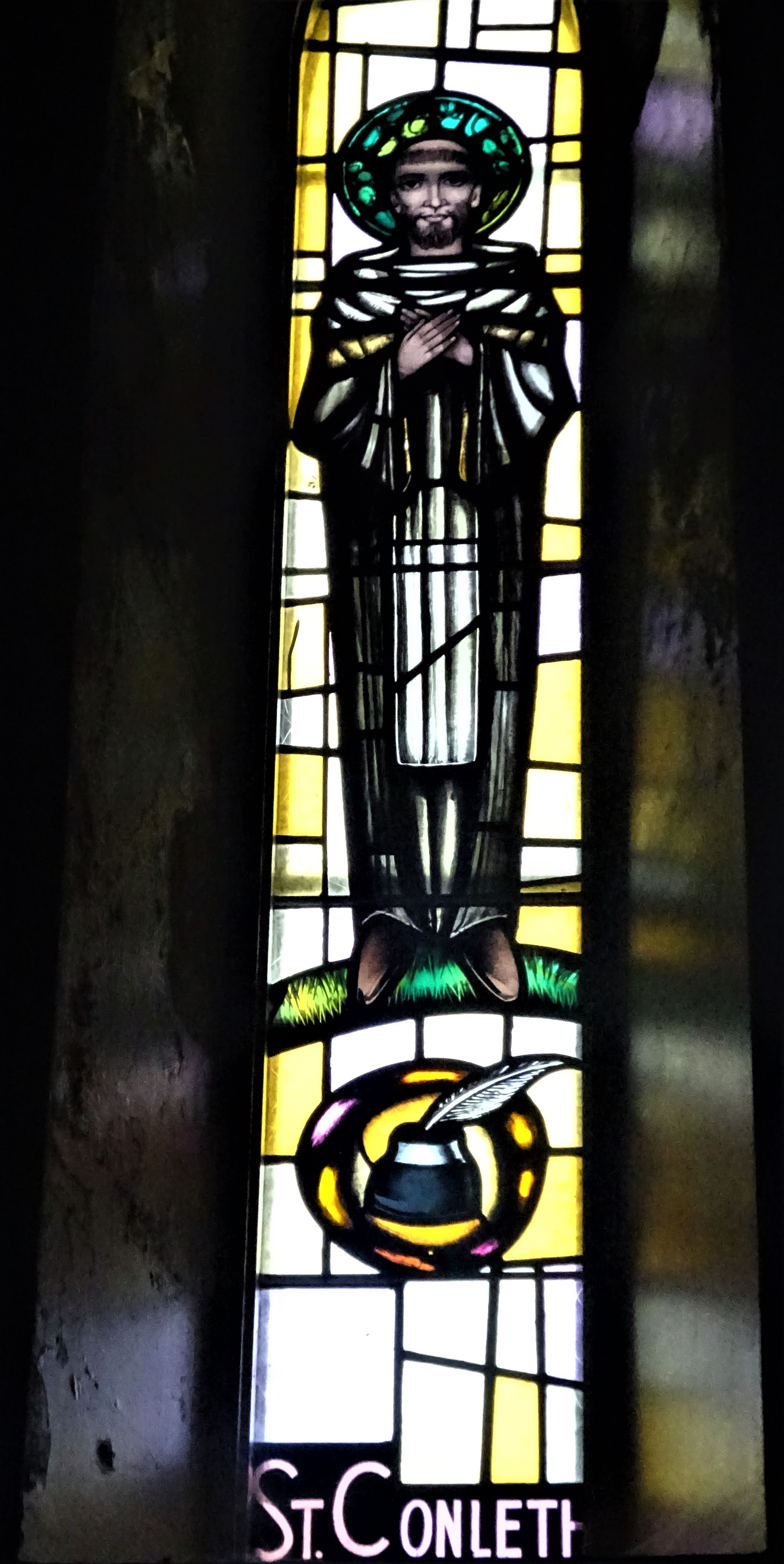
St. Conleth, hermit and first Bishop of Kildare.

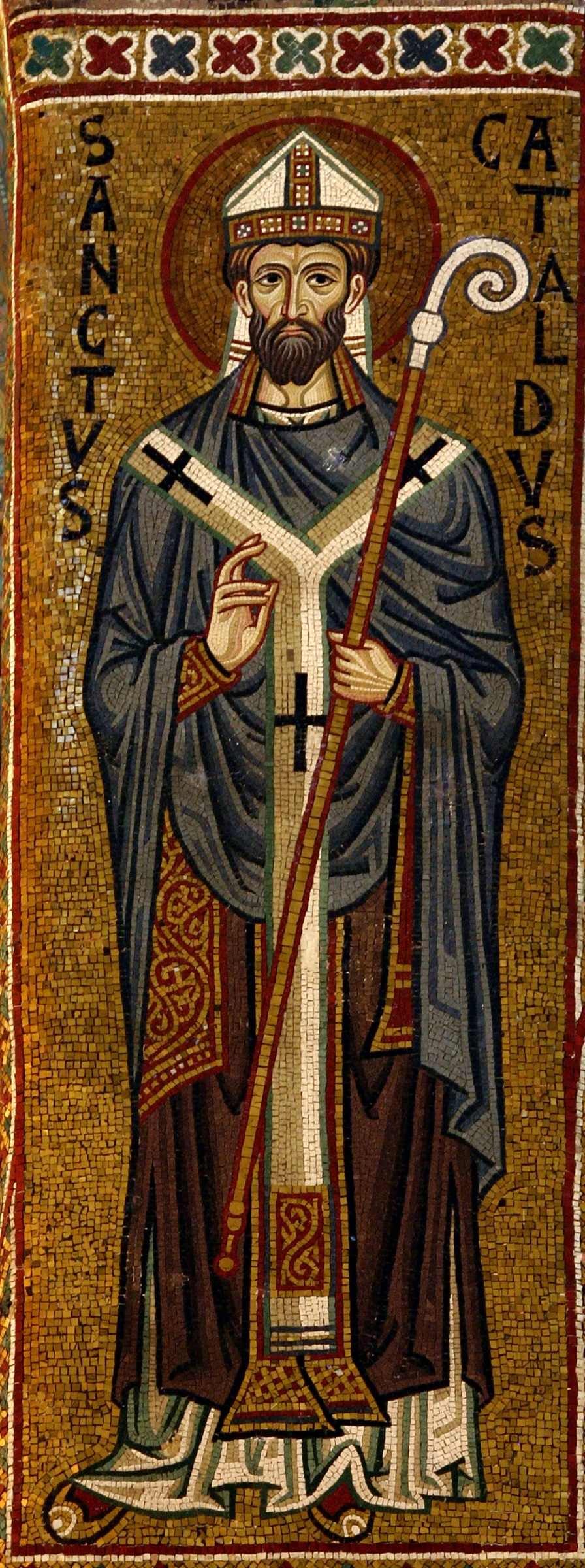
St. Cataldus.

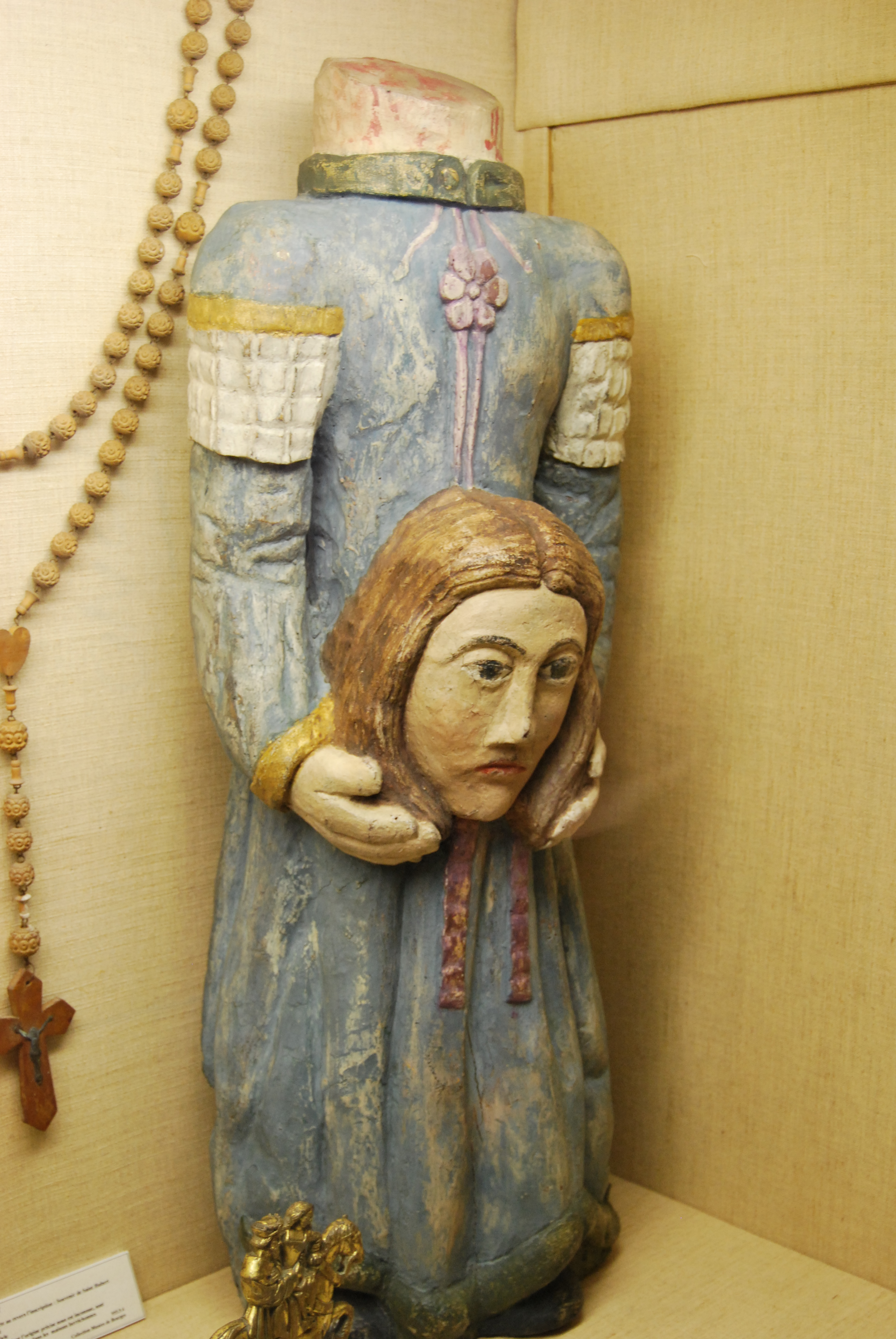
Virgin-martyr Solangia (Solange).

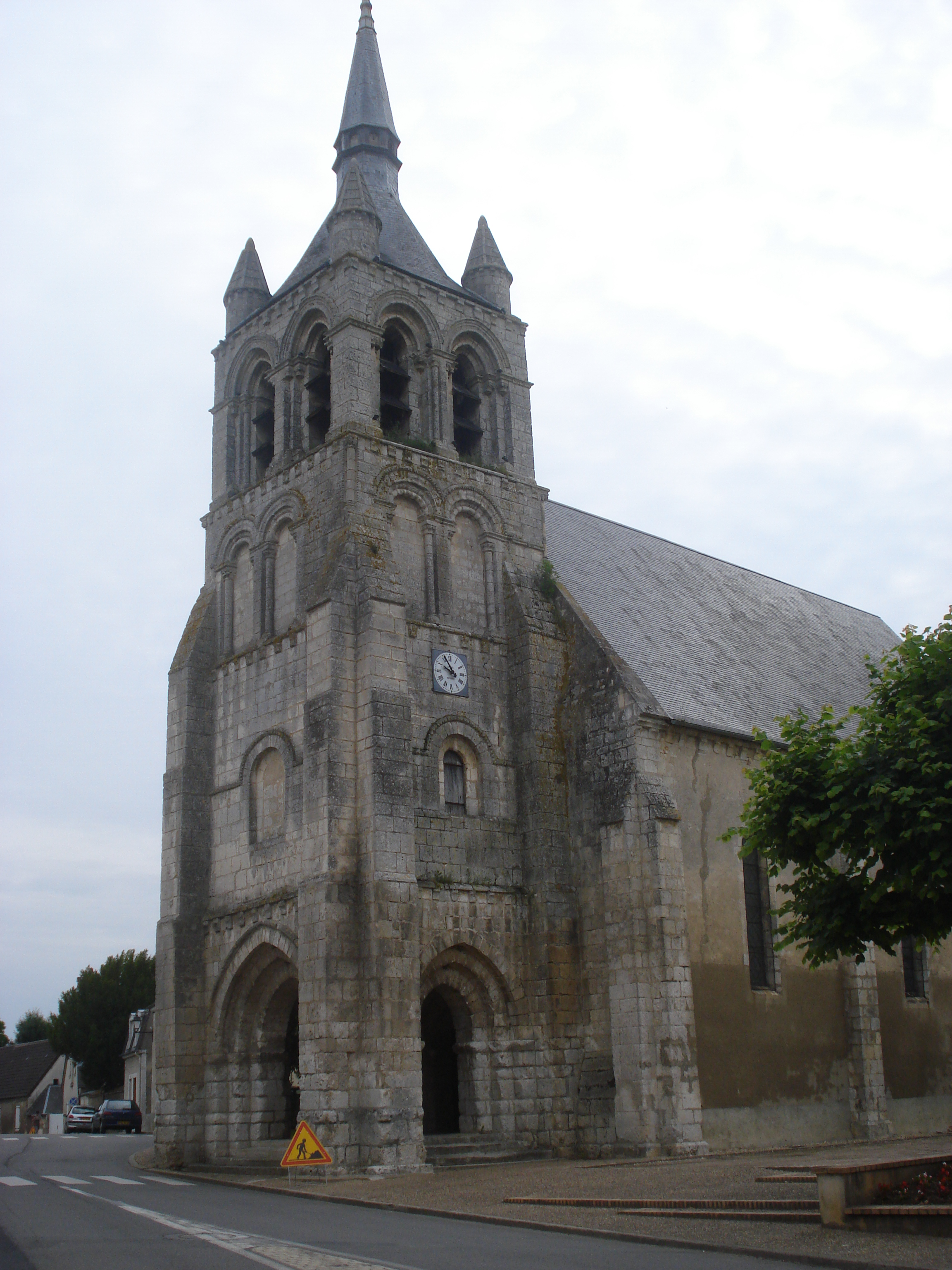
Church of St. Solange, Sainte-Solange, Cher, France.

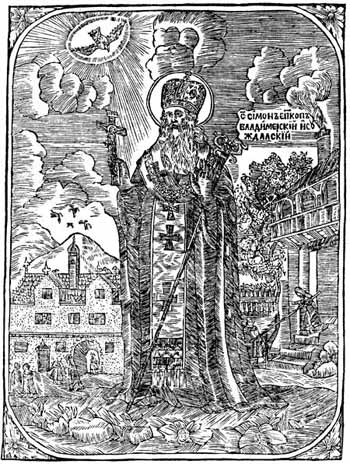
Saint Simon of Vladimir and Suzdal.

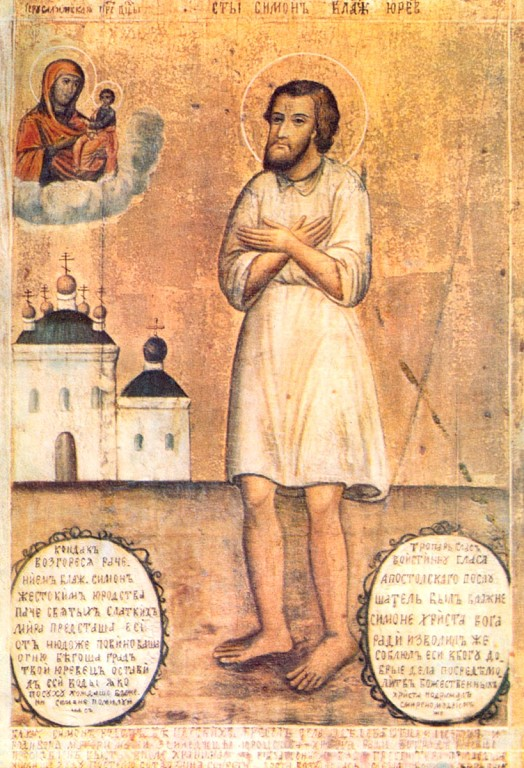
Blessed Simon of Yurievets and Zharki, Fool-for-Christ.

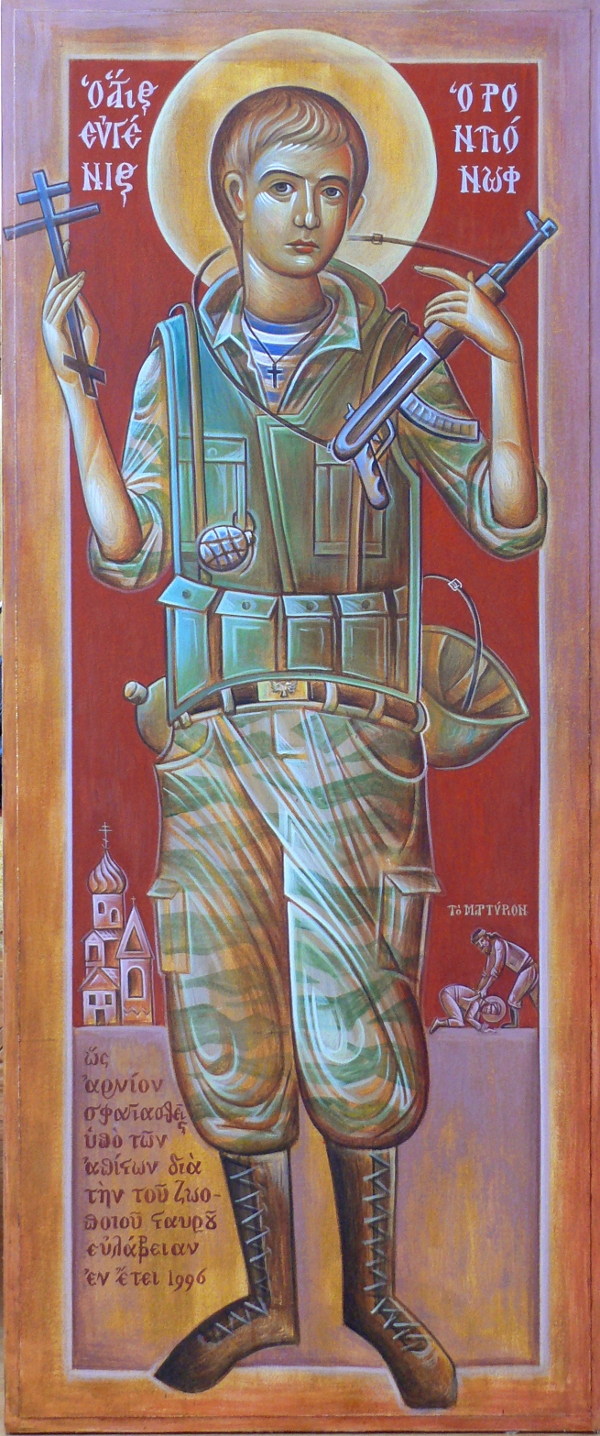
Soldier Eugene Rodionov.

== Sources ==
- May 10/23. Orthodox Calendar (PRAVOSLAVIE.RU).
- May 23 / May 10. HOLY TRINITY RUSSIAN ORTHODOX CHURCH (A parish of the Patriarchate of Moscow).
- May 10. OCA - The Lives of the Saints.
- May 10. Latin Saints of the Orthodox Patriarchate of Rome.
- May 10. The Roman Martyrology.

Greek Sources

- Great Synaxaristes: (in Greek) 10 ΜΑΪΟΥ. ΜΕΓΑΣ ΣΥΝΑΞΑΡΙΣΤΗΣ.
- (in Greek) Συναξαριστής. 10 Μαΐου. ECCLESIA.GR. (H ΕΚΚΛΗΣΙΑ ΤΗΣ ΕΛΛΑΔΟΣ).

Russian Sources

- (in Russian) 23 мая (10 мая). Православная Энциклопедия под редакцией Патриарха Московского и всея Руси Кирилла (электронная версия). (Orthodox Encyclopedia - Pravenc.ru).
- (in Russian) 10 мая (ст.ст.) 23 мая 2013 (нов. ст.). Русская Православная Церковь Отдел внешних церковных связей. (DECR).
