= May 24 (Eastern Orthodox liturgics) =

Day in the Eastern Orthodox liturgical calendar

Eastern Orthodox liturgical calendar
May 23	May 24	May 25
May 24 O.S. ≍ June 6 N.S. May 24 N.S ≍ May 11 O.S.

An Eastern Orthodox cross

May 24 in Eastern Orthodox liturgical calendars is a feast day and a day of commemoration of saints and martyrs. Although some Orthodox churches use the Revised Julian Calendar and others use the traditional Julian calendar, the fixed commemorations for their respective May 24 are broadly the same, no matter which calendar is used. (Note: Despite the dates being the same, the days to which they refer typically differ by 13 days. The notation Old Style or O.S. is sometimes used to indicate a date in the traditional Julian Calendar (the "Old Calendar"). The notation New Style or N.S. indicates a date in the Revised Julian calendar (the "New Calendar").)

== Saints ==
- Martyrs Meletius Stratelates, Stephen, John, and 1218 soldiers with women and children, including:

- Serapion the Egyptian, Callinicus the former Magician, Theodore, Faustus, the women Marciana, Susanna, and Palladia, two children Cyriacus and Christian; and
- Twelve tribunes: Faustus, Festus, Marcellus, Theodore, Meletius, Sergius, Marcellinus, Felix, Photinus, Theodoriscus, Mercurius, and Didymus — all of whom suffered in Galatia (c.138-161)

- Venerable Symeon Stylites the Younger of the Wonderful Mountain (c. 596)
- Saint Kyriakos (Cyriacus) of Evrychou, in Cyprus, the Wonderworker.
- Nun-martyr Martha, abbess of Monemvasia (990) (see also: May 5)

== Pre-Schism Western saints ==
- Martyrs Donatian and Rogatian, brothers (299) (see also: May 23)
- Martyr Afra (304)
- Martyr Robustian, at Milan.
- Martyr Vincent of Porto, near Rome.
- Martyrs Zöellus, Servilius, Felix, Silvanus, and Diocles, in Istria.
- Saint Patrice (Patrick), fourth Bishop of Bayeux in France (c.469) (see also: May 23)
- Saint Elpidios (Elpidius), Bishop of Aversa in Campania, southern Italy (5th century) (Note: "ELPIDIUS (12), ST. The first of the four recorded bishops of Atella in Campania cir. A.D. 400. Great sanctity and many miracles were attributed to him and to his brother St. Cyo a presbyter and his nephew St. Elpicius a deacon, both of whom also lived at Atella. St. Elpidius was buried at Salerno, and his festival was on May 24. Some suppose that he is an African refugee in the Vandal persecution.")
- Saint Vincent of Lerins (445)

== Post-Schism Orthodox saints ==
- Venerable Nikita Stylites, Wonderworker of Pereyaslavl-Zalesski (1186)
- Saint Gregory of Novgorod, Archbishop of Novgorod and Pskov (1193) (Note: See: (in Russian) Григорий (архиепископ Новгородский). Википедии. (Russian Wikipedia).)
- Saint Blondina Gobjilă (Blondina of Iași, Mama Blondina), a Confessor from the communist period who was exiled to Siberia for 15 years (1971) (Note: See: (in Romanian) Blandina Gobjilă. Wikipedia. (Romanian Wikipedia).)

=== New martyrs and confessors ===
- Martyrdom by the Poles of Abbot Anthony, 40 monks, and over 1,000 laymen at the St. Paisius of Uglich Monastery (1609) (Note: See: (in Russian) Паисиев Покровский монастырь. Википедии. (Russian Wikipedia).) (see also: May 14)

== Other commemorations ==
- Translation of the relics (c.1067) of St. George of the Holy Mountain and Georgia (1065)
- Inauguration of the church of Virgin Mary in Karrais (Al Kara) of Syria.
- Glorification (1988) of Saint Xenia of Petersburg, fool-for-Christ (c.1803)
- Repose of Monk Cyriacus of Valaam (1818)
- Repose of Blessed Amphilochius of the Rostov Spaso-Yakovlevsky Monastery (1824)

== Icon gallery ==
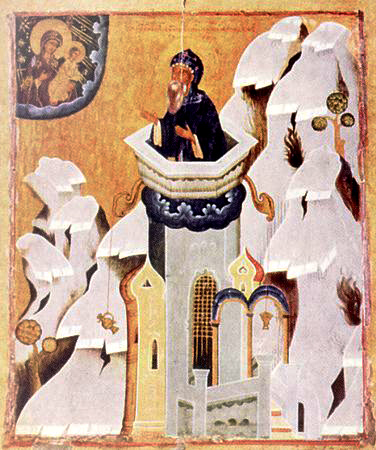
St. Simeon Stylites the Younger.

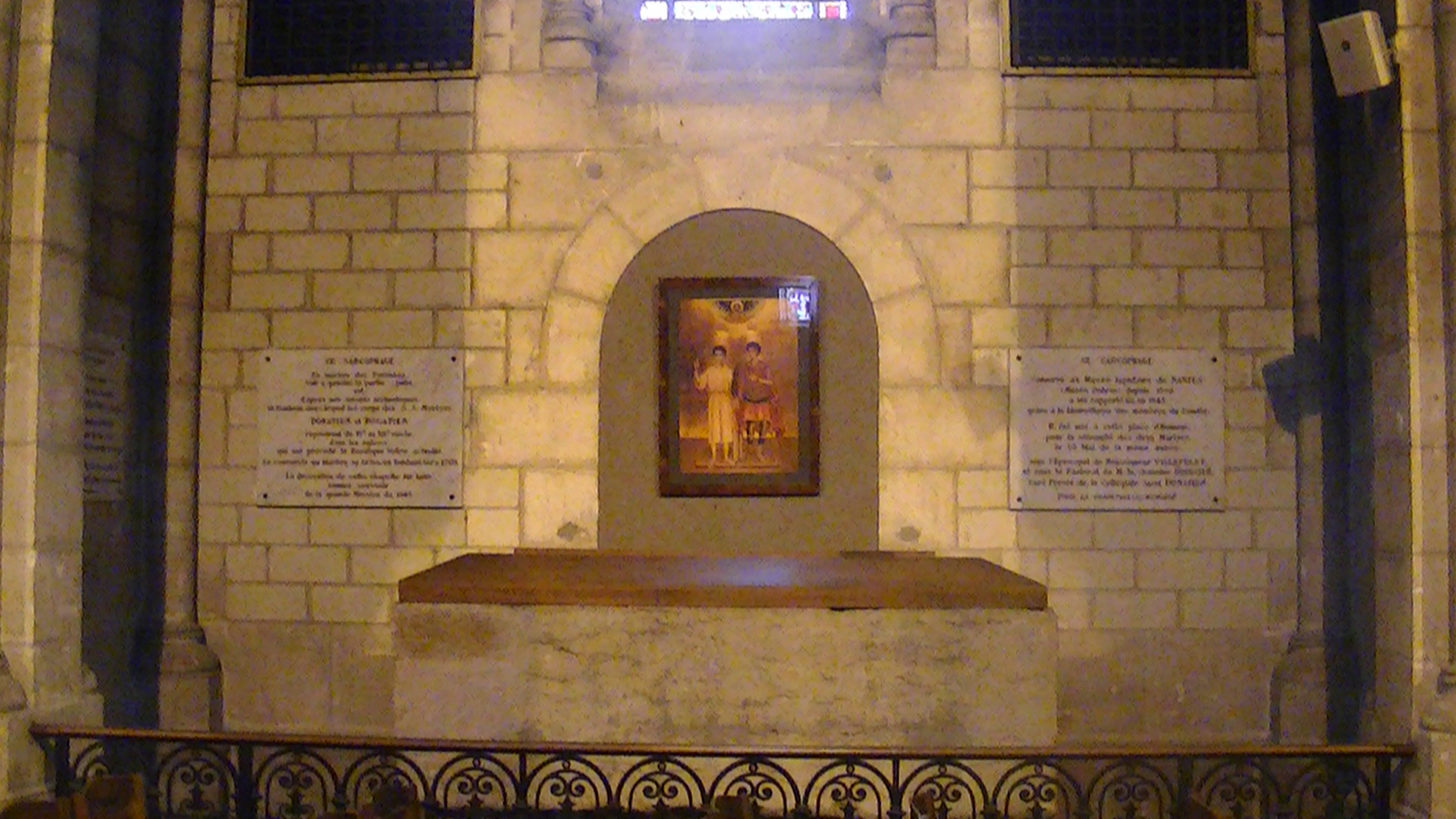
Tomb of Sts. Donatian and Rogatian in the Basilica of Sts. Donatian and Rogatian. The tomb is empty, as the relics were transferred to Ostia in the twelfth century.

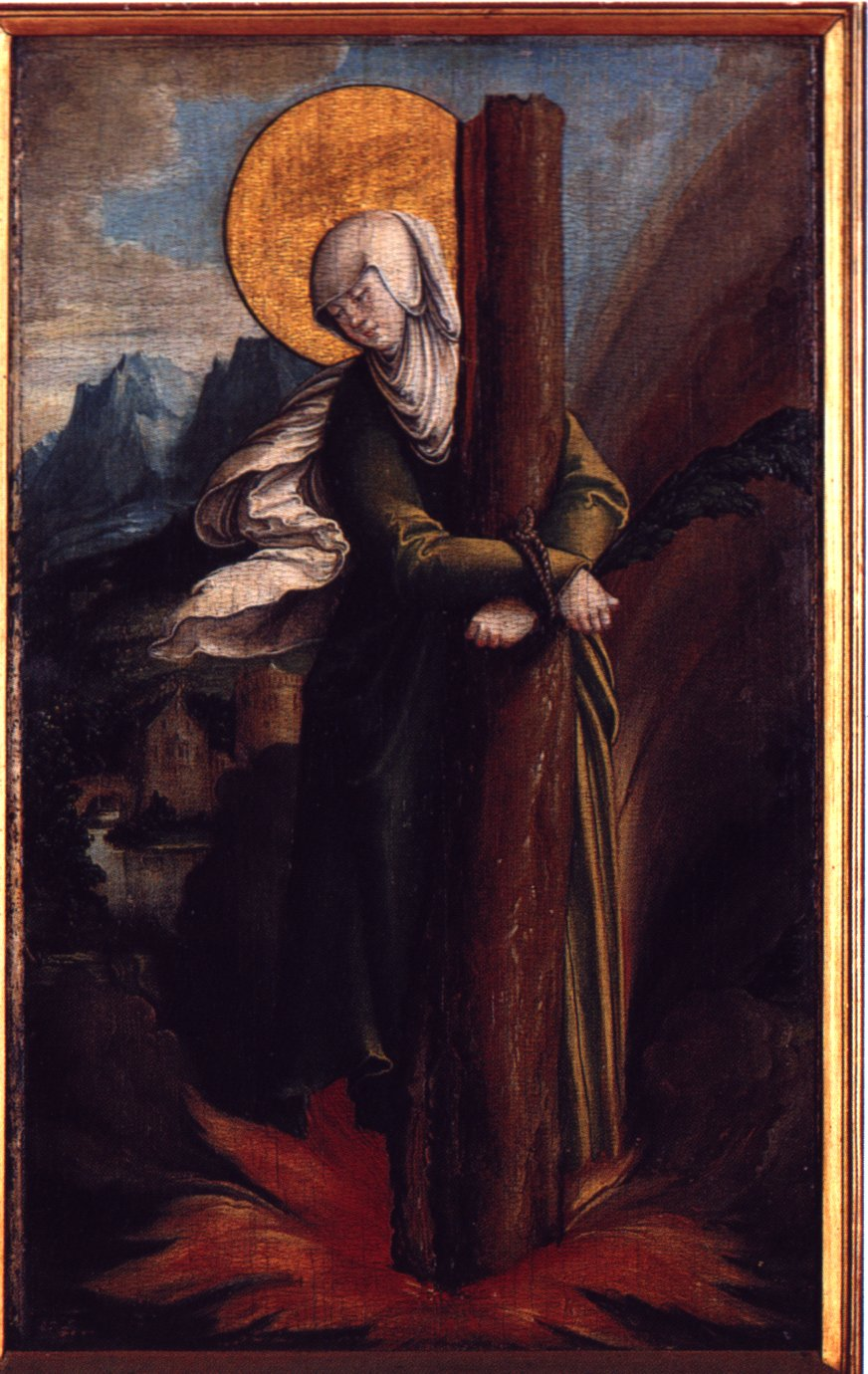
St. Afra.

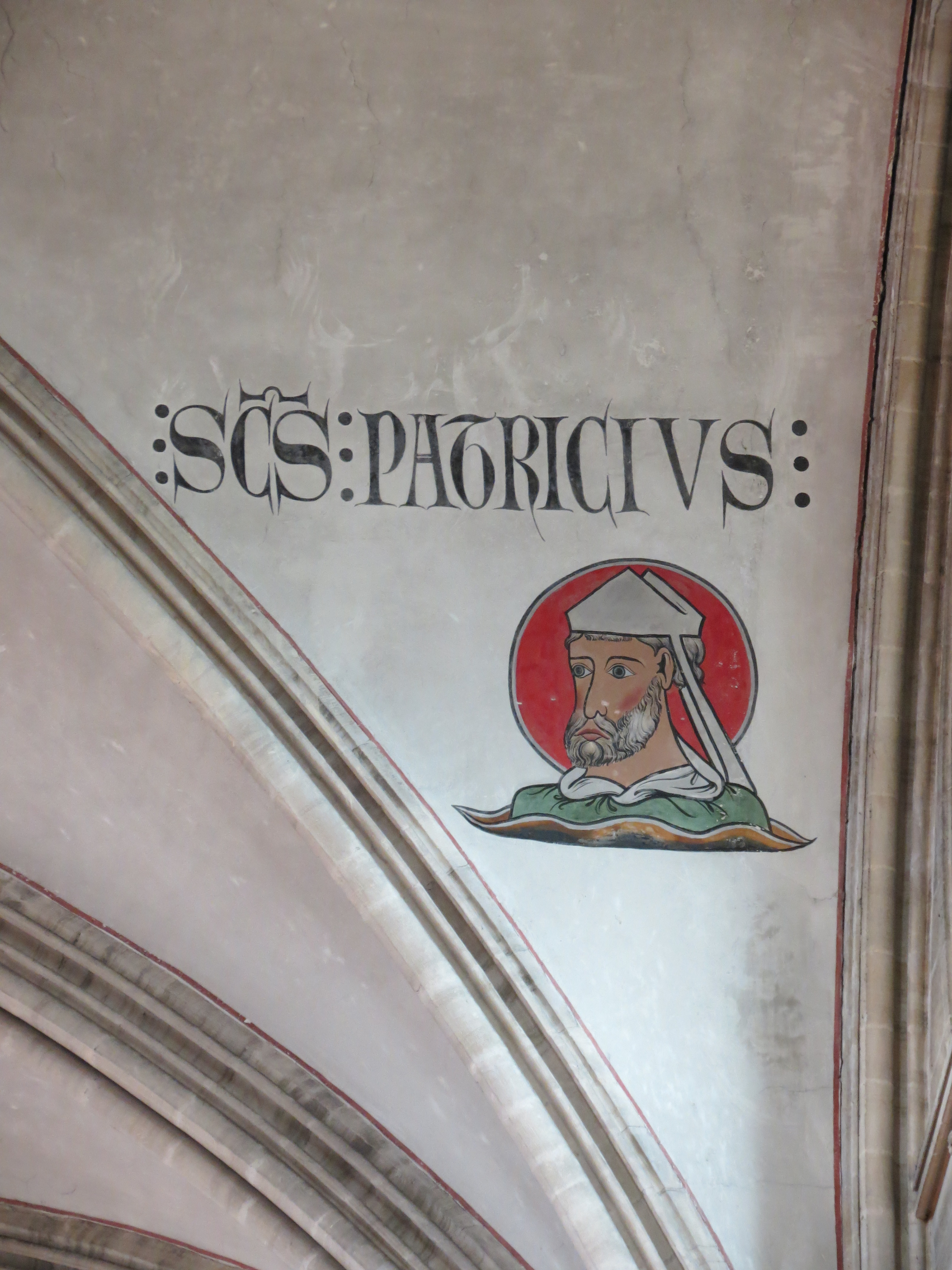
Saint Patricius (Patrice), Bishop of Bayeux.

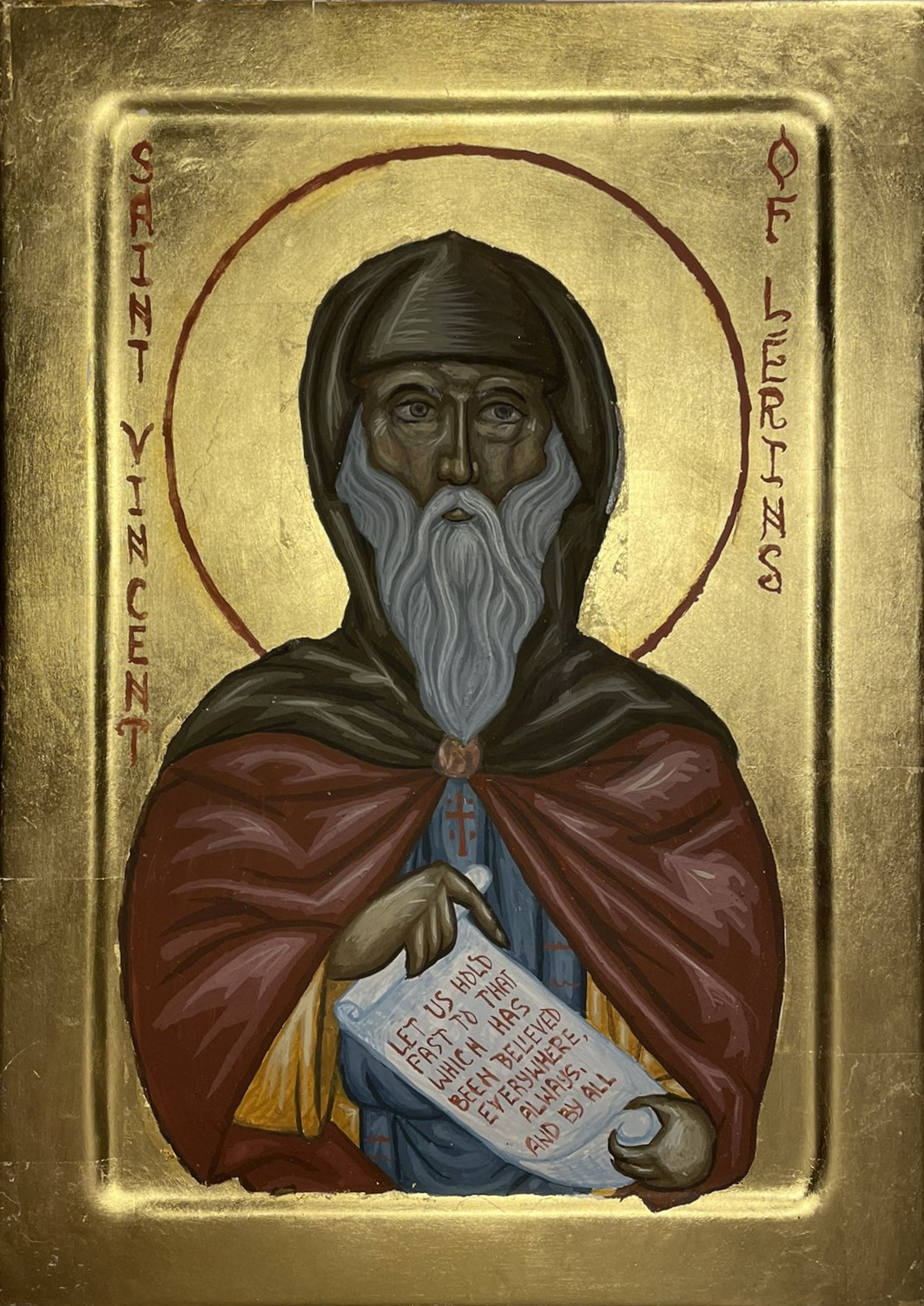
Saint Vincent of Lerins.

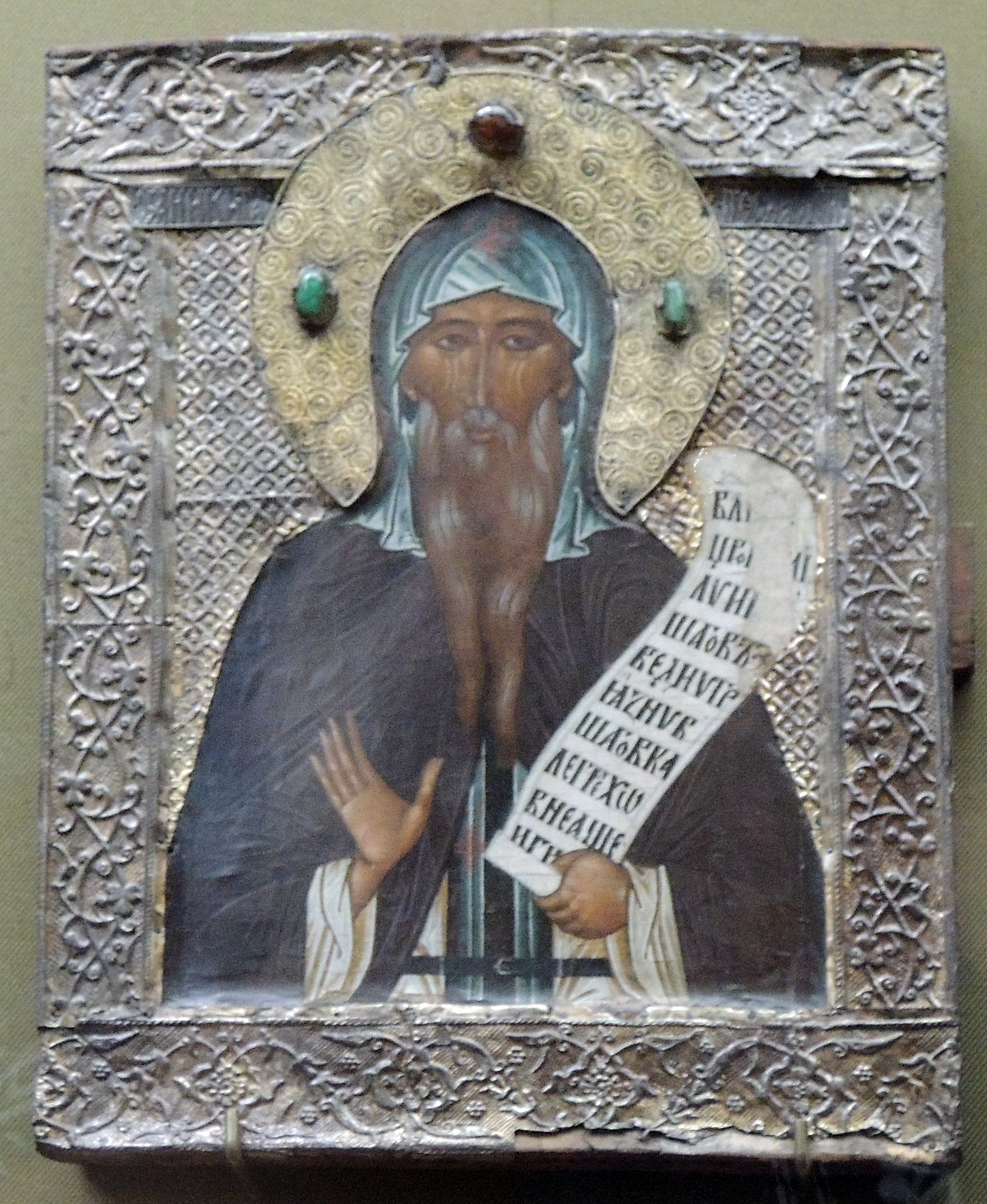
St. Nikita Stylites.

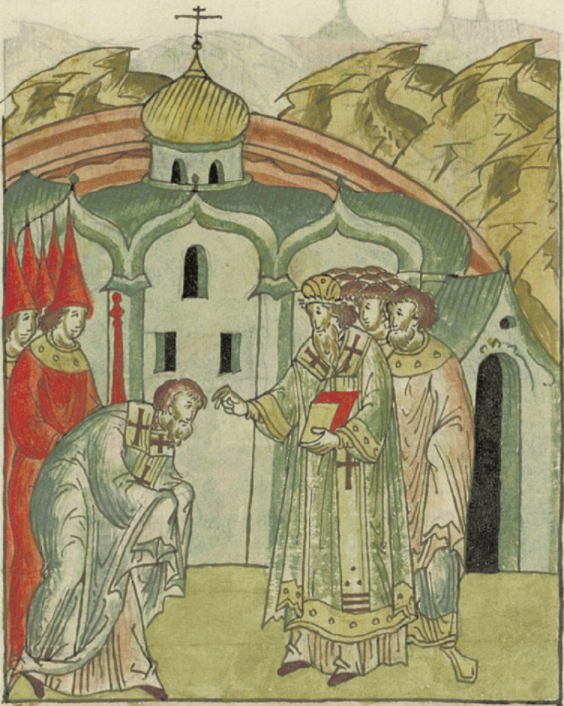
Metropolitan Nikephoros consecrates Gabriel Nikolaevich as Bishop of Novgorod under the name Gregory.

== Sources ==
- May 24/June 6. Orthodox Calendar (ORTHOCHRISTIAN.COM).
- June 6 / May 24. HOLY TRINITY RUSSIAN ORTHODOX CHURCH (A parish of the Patriarchate of Moscow).
- May 24. OCA - The Lives of the Saints.
- May 24. The Roman Martyrology.
- May 24. Latin Saints of the Orthodox Patriarchate of Rome.

Greek Sources

- Great Synaxaristes: (in Greek) 24 ΜΑΪΟΥ. ΜΕΓΑΣ ΣΥΝΑΞΑΡΙΣΤΗΣ.
- (in Greek) Συναξαριστής. 24 Μαΐου. ECCLESIA.GR. (H ΕΚΚΛΗΣΙΑ ΤΗΣ ΕΛΛΑΔΟΣ).

Russian Sources

- (in Russian) 6 июня (24 мая). Православная Энциклопедия под редакцией Патриарха Московского и всея Руси Кирилла (электронная версия). (Orthodox Encyclopedia - Pravenc.ru).
- (in Russian) 24 мая (ст.ст.) 6 июня 2013 (нов. ст.). Русская Православная Церковь Отдел внешних церковных связей. (DECR).
