= Adrian of Poshekhonye =

Russian Orthodox monk and iconographer

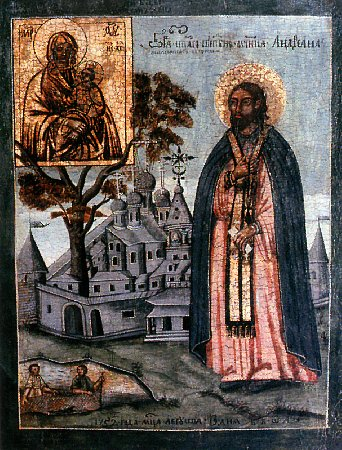
Icon of Saint Adrian of Posekhon (18th century, Yaroslavl)

Adrian of Poshekhonye (Russian: Адриан Пошехонский; died 1550) was a Russian Orthodox monk and iconographer, who was the founder and first hegumen (abbot) of the Dormition monastery in Poshekhonye, north Yaroslavl region. He is commemorated as a saint in the Eastern Orthodox Church.

Adrian was born in Rostov near the end of the sixteenth century, of pious parents named Gregory and Irene. He received monastic tonsure at the monastery of Cornelius of Komel ("Korneliev" Monastery). There he was ordained a hierodeacon (i.e., a monastic deacon). Three years after the death of his spiritual father, Cornelius, he received a blessing to go and found a new monastery, dedicated to the Theotokos (Virgin Mary). The monastery was built on the river Votkha in Poshekhonye. Macarius the Metropolitan of Moscow blessed the foundation and gave them a charter to that effect. He ordained Adrian a hieromonk (monastic priest) and elevated him to the rank of hegumen.

During Great Lent of 1550, in the evening on March 5, armed robbers burst into the monastery and murdered Adrian after torturing him mercilessly. He was buried by his brethren in the monastery's Temple (Church) of the prophet Elijah.

The relics of Adrian were uncovered on December 17, 1626, and found to be incorrupt. They were translated to the monastery church and placed in an open reliquary by the right kliros (choir) for veneration by the faithful. His feast day is celebrated on March 5 (for those churches which follow the traditional Julian Calendar, March 5 falls on March 18 of the modern Gregorian Calendar). He is also commemorated, in common with other saints of the Yaroslavl region, on May 23 (June 5), the "Synaxis of the Saints of Rostov and Yaroslavl", and on November 19 (December 2), the feast of the Uncovering of his Relics.
