= May 11 (Eastern Orthodox liturgics) =

Day in the Eastern Orthodox liturgical calendar

Eastern Orthodox liturgical calendar
May 10	May 11	May 12
May 11 O.S. ≍ May 24 N.S. May 11 N.S ≍ April 28 O.S.

An Eastern Orthodox cross

May 11 in Eastern Orthodox liturgical calendars is a feast day and a day of commemoration of saints and martyrs. Although some Orthodox churches use the Revised Julian Calendar and others use the traditional Julian calendar, the fixed commemorations for their respective May 11 are broadly the same, no matter which calendar is used. (Note: Despite the dates being the same, the days to which they refer typically differ by 13 days. The notation Old Style or O.S. is sometimes used to indicate a date in the traditional Julian Calendar (the "Old Calendar"). The notation New Style or N.S. indicates a date in the Revised Julian calendar (the "New Calendar").)

== Saints ==
- Martyr Evellius, under Nero (66)
- Martyrs Maximus, Bassus, and Fabius (284–305)
- Hieromartyr Mocius (Mucius), presbyter of Amphipolis in Macedonia, beheaded in Byzantium (288)
- Martyr Armodius. (Note: The Holy martyr Armodius is unknown in the Synaxaristes and Menaia, however his memory is preserved in an 11th-century codex from the Abbey of Santa Maria di Grottaferrata (Greek: μονῆς Κρυπτοφέρρης) near Rome.)
- Saints Cyril and Methodius, Equal-to-the-Apostles and Enlighteners of the Slavs (869, 885) (see also: July 17 )
- Saints Clement of Ohrid (916), Sabbas (10th century), Angelarius (Angelyar) (c. 886), Gorazd (896), and Naum of Preslav (910) — Disciples of Saints Cyril and Methodius and missionaries of the Slavs, Wonderworkers and Equal-to-the-Apostles. (see also: July 27 )
- Saint Rostislav the Prince of Greater Moravia, Confessor of the Faith and Equal-to-the-Apostles (870) (see also: October 29)

== Pre-Schism Western saints ==
- Hieromartyr Anthimus of Rome, and martyrs Sisinius the deacon with Diocletius and Florentius (disciples of St. Anthimus), (284–305)
- Saint Principia of Rome, a holy virgin in Rome and disciple of St Marcella (420)
- Saint Mammertus, Archbishop of Vienne (475)
- Saint Possessor of Verdun, Bishop of Verdun, he and his flock were greatly troubled by the barbarian invasions of Franks, Vandals and Goths (c. 486)
- Saint Tudy (Tudinus, Tegwin, Thetgo), a disciple of St Brioc in Brittany (5th century)
- Saint Credan of Cornwall, hogherd.
- Saint Gangulphus (760)
- Saint Fremund of Dunstable, Anglo-Saxon hermit, killed by his kinsman Oswy with the help of Danish invaders who had also murdered King Edmund (866)
- Saint Odo of Cluny, the second Abbot of Cluny (942)
- Saint Mayeul (Majolus, Maieul), Abbot of Cluny (994)
- Saint Odilo of Cluny (1049)

== Post-Schism Orthodox saints ==
- Martyrs Olympia, Abbess of Mytilene, and nun Euphrosyne (1235)
- Saint Sophronius of the Kiev Caves, recluse (13th century) (Note: See also March 11.)
- Saint Nicodemus of Pec, Archbishop of Serbia (1324)
- Hieromartyr Joseph, first Metropolitan of Astrakhan (1672) (Note: See: (in Russian) Иосиф (митрополит Астраханский). Википедии. (Russian Wikipedia).)
- Blessed Christopher of Georgia (Christesias), monk at the Monastery of St. John the Baptist, at the David Gareja monastery complex, "The Thebaid of Georgia" (1771)
- New Martyr Dioscorus (Dioscorides) the New, of Smyrna, by beheading.
- New Martyr Argyrus (Argyrus, Argyres) of Thessalonica (1806)
- Saint Theophylact, Bishop of Stavropol and Ekaterinodar (1872)
- Venerable Saint Dionisie (Ignat) of Mount Athos, who lived at the Holy Cell of St. George at Kolitsou, under Vatopedi Monastery (2004) (Note: He was glorified by the Ecumenical Patriarchate on August 31, 2025. The official communiqué of the Ecumenical Patriarchate was as follows: (in Greek) "Ἐπίσης ἀπεφάσισεν ὁμοφώνως, εἰσηγήσει τῆς Κανονικῆς Ἐπιτροπῆς, τήν κατάταξιν εἰς τό ἁγιολόγιον τῆς Ἐκκλησίας τῶν ἐν Ἄθωνι ἀσκησάντων ὁσιακῆς βιοτῆς Διονυσίου Βατοπαιδινοῦ, τοῦ ἐν τῷ Ἱερῷ Κελλίῳ Ἁγίου Γεωργίου Κολιτσοῦ, καί Πετρωνίου Ἱερομονάχου, Δικαίου τῆς Ἱερᾶς Σκήτης Τιμίου Προδρόμου, τῆς Ἱερᾶς Μονῆς Μεγίστης Λαύρας, τῆς μνήμης αὐτῶν τελουμένης τοῦ μέν πρώτου, τῇ 11ῃ Μαΐου, τοῦ δέ δευτέρου, τῇ 24ῃ Φεβρουαρίου ἑκάστου ἔτους.") (Note: See: (in Romanian) Dionisie Ignat. Wikipedia. (Romanian Wikipedia).)

=== New martyrs and confessors ===
- New Hieromartyr Michael Belorossov, priest (1920)
- New Hieromartyr Alexander (Petrovsky), Archbishop of Kharkov (1940) (Note: See: (in Russian) Александр (Петровский). Википедии. (Russian Wikipedia).)

== Other commemorations ==
- Commemoration of the Founding of Constantinople as Capital of the Roman Empire (330)
- Consecration of the first Saint Sophia Cathedral in Kiev, erected by Princess Olga (960)
- "Chelnsk" Icon of the Most Holy Theotokos.

== Icon gallery ==
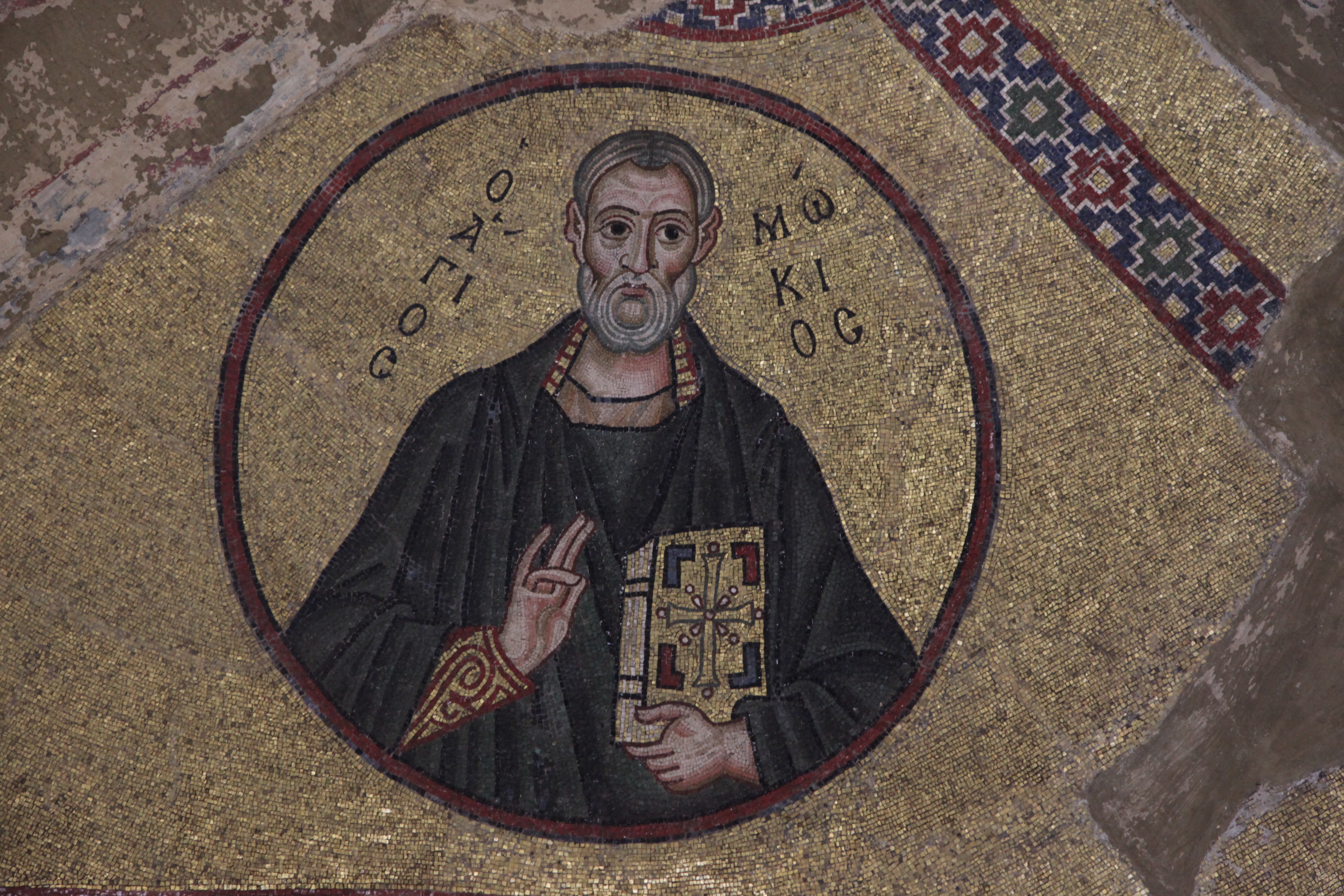
Hieromartyr Mocius, Presbyter of Amphipolis.

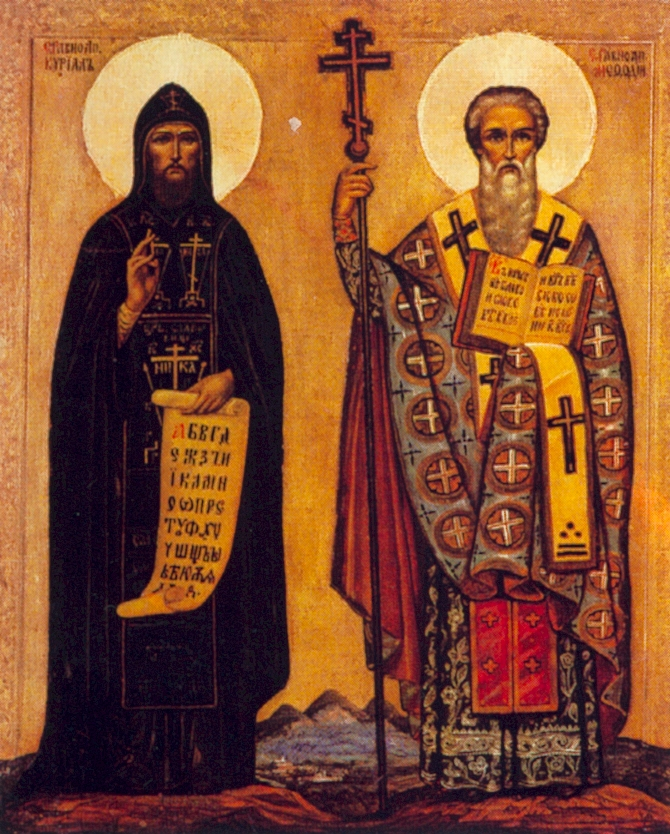
Saints Saints Cyril and Methodius, Equals-to-the-Apostles.

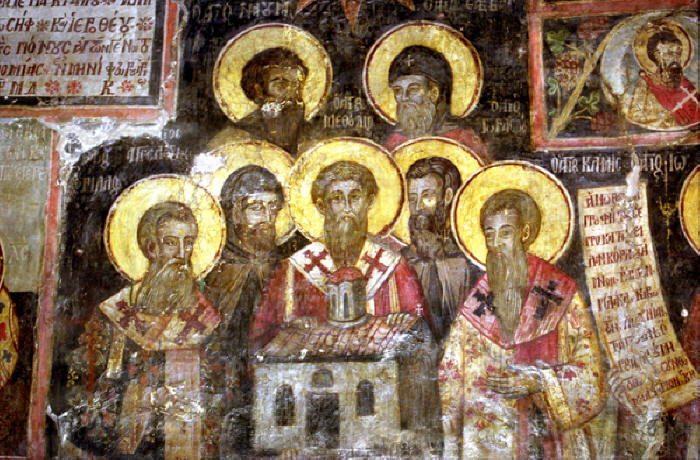
The Seven Apostles.

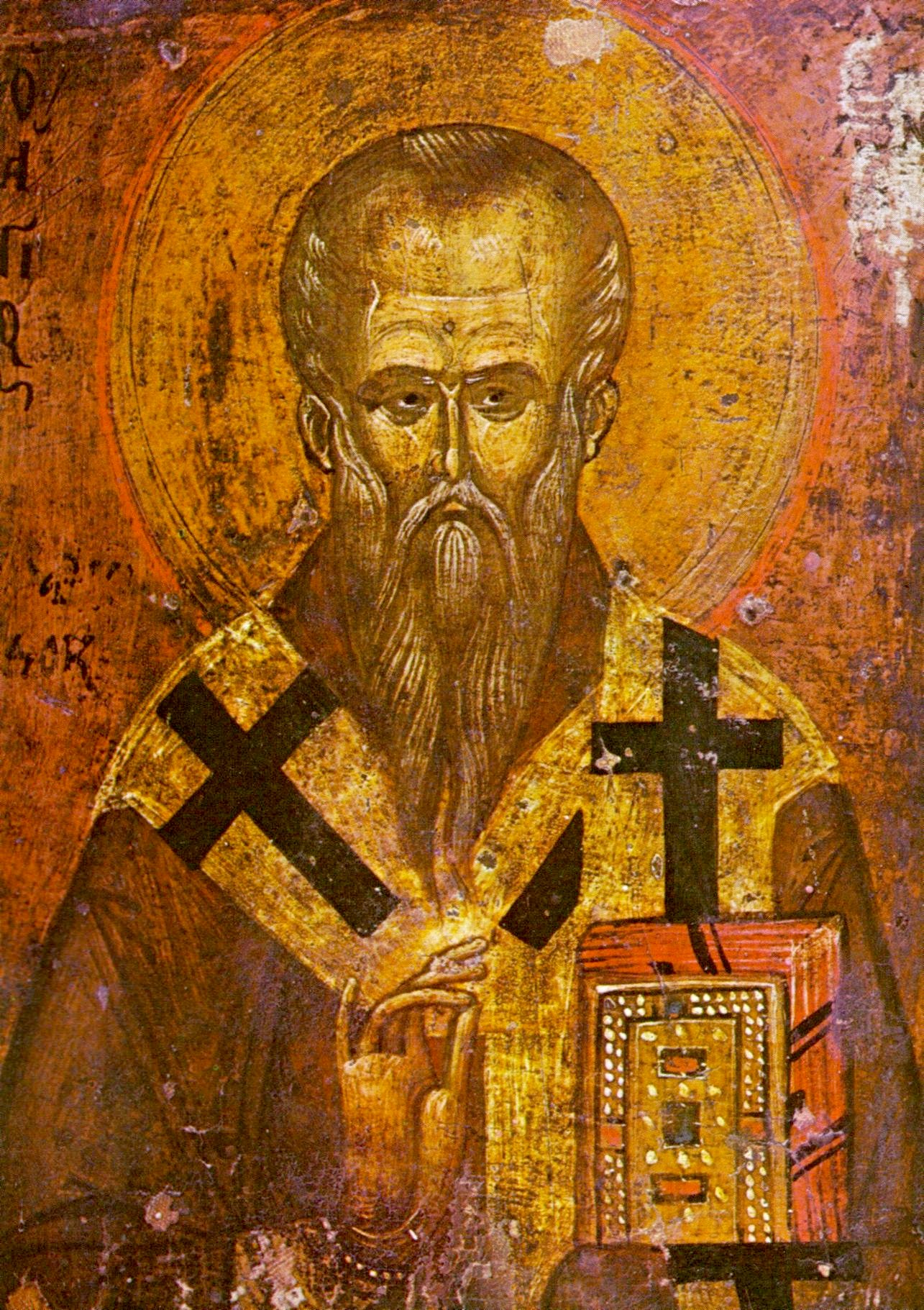
St. Clement of Ohrid.

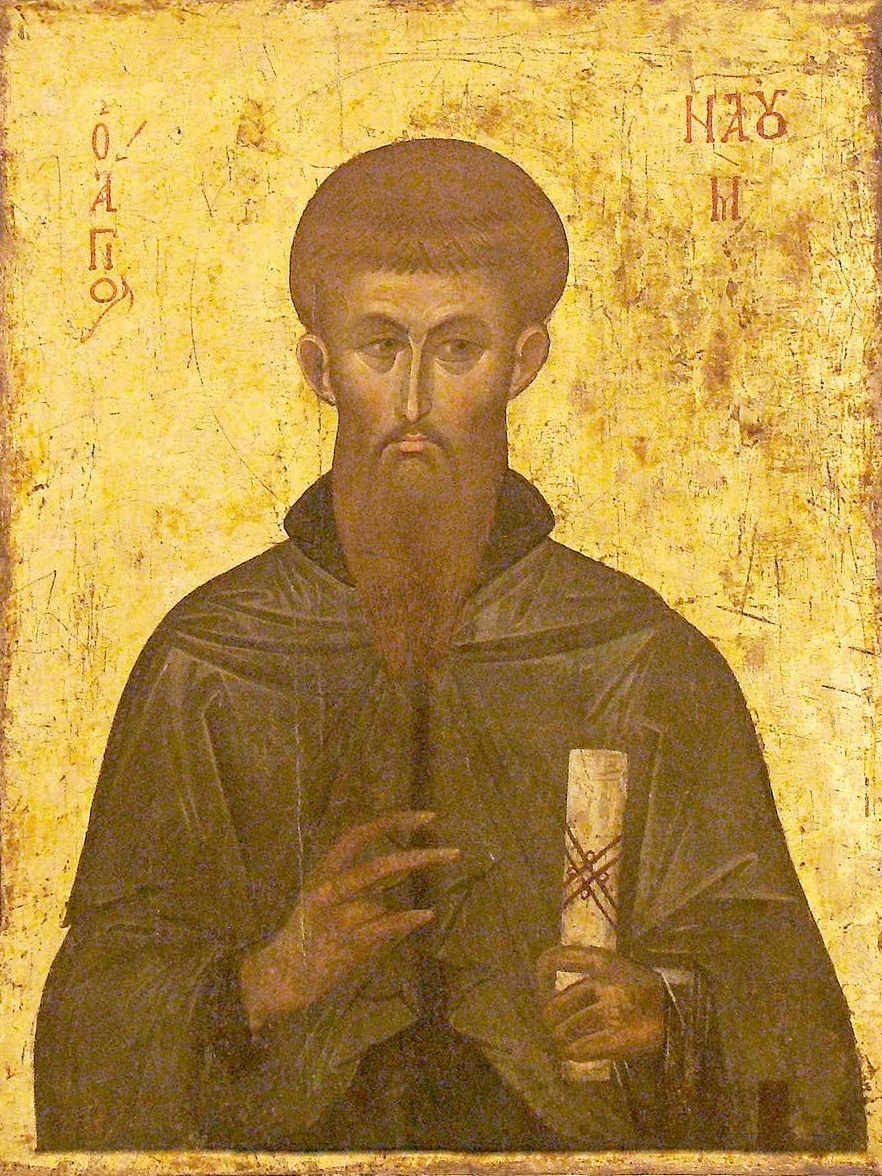
Saint Naum of Preslav.

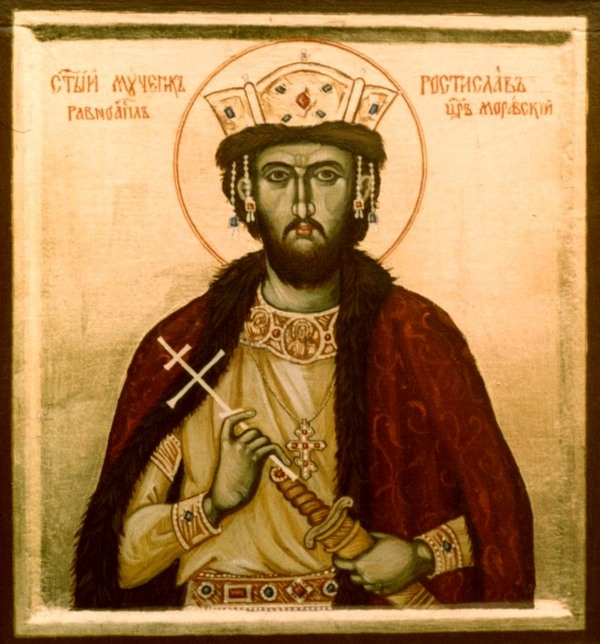
St. Rostislav the Prince of Great Moravia, Confessor of the Faith.

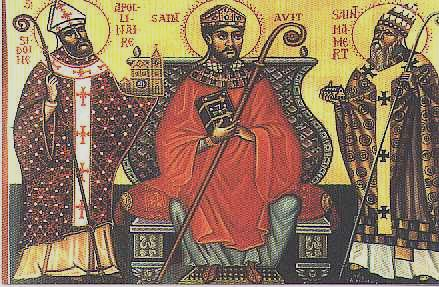
St. Mamertus, Archbishop of Vienne (right).

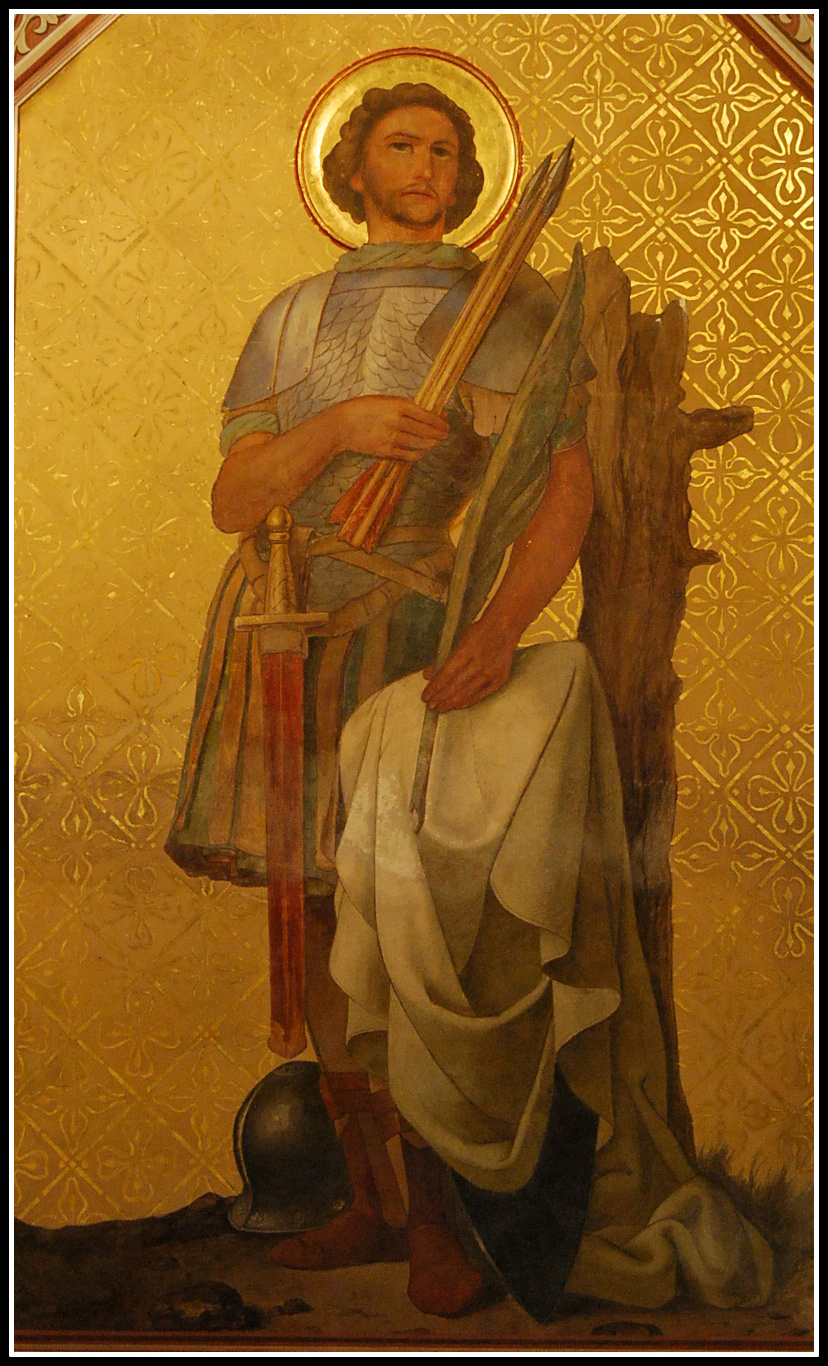
St. Gangulphus of Burgundy.

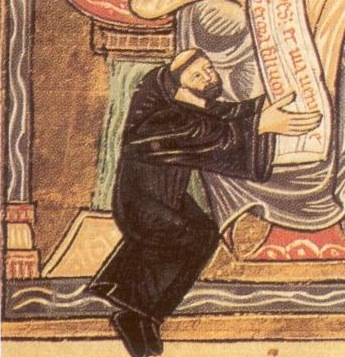
St. Odo of Cluny.

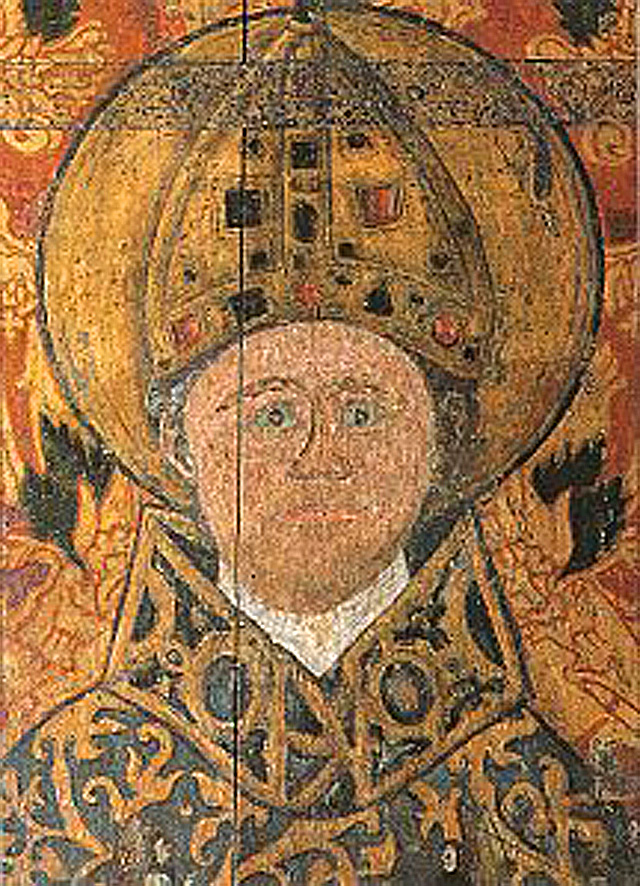
St. Majolus of Cluny.

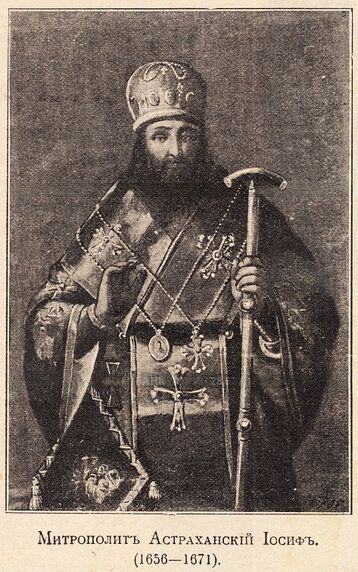
Hieromartyr Joseph, first Metropolitan of Astrakhan.

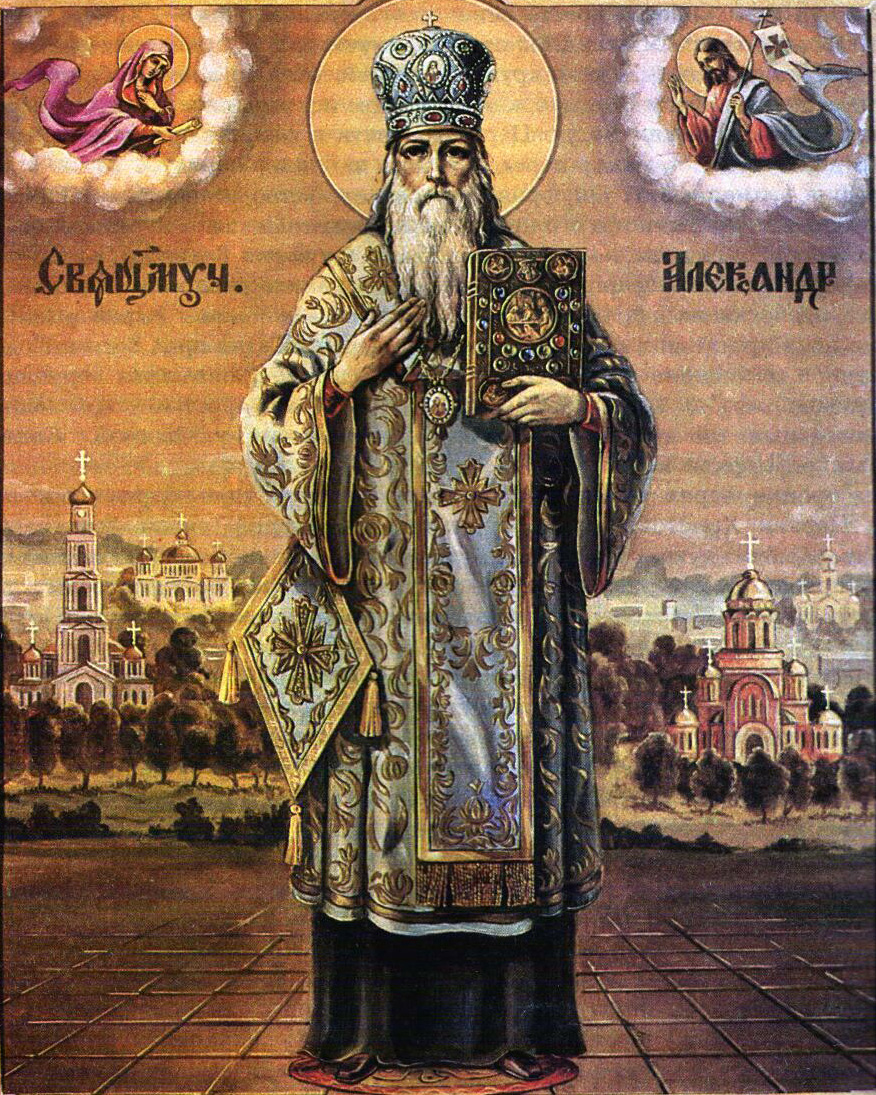
New Hieromartyr Alexander (Petrovsky), Abp. of Kharkov.

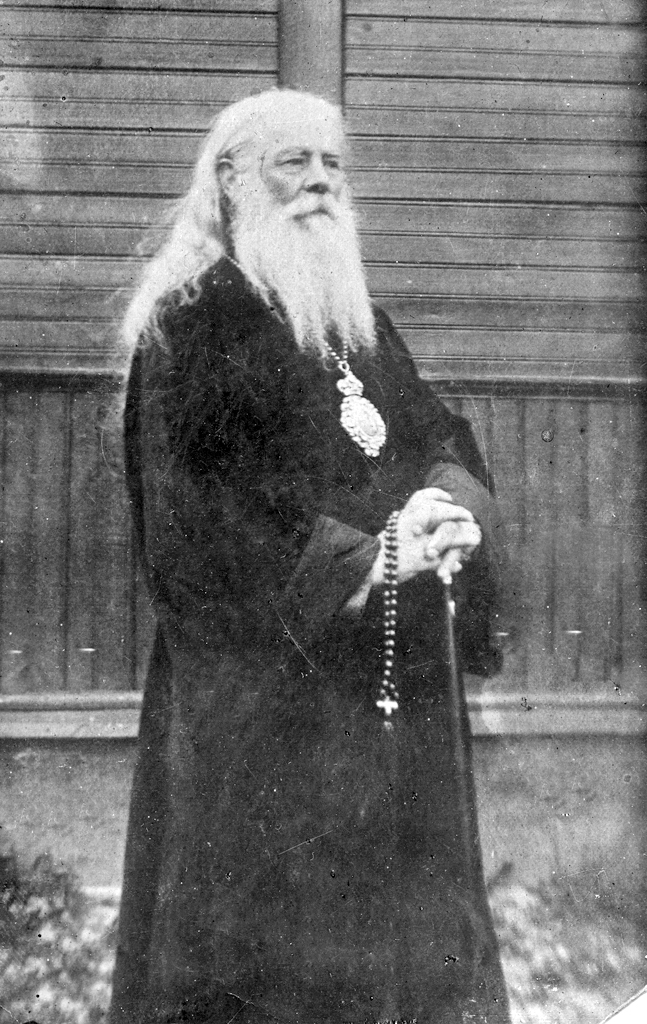
New Hieromartyr Alexander (Petrovsky), Abp. of Kharkov.

== Sources ==
- May 11/24. Orthodox Calendar (PRAVOSLAVIE.RU).
- May 24 / May 11. HOLY TRINITY RUSSIAN ORTHODOX CHURCH (A parish of the Patriarchate of Moscow).
- May 11. OCA - The Lives of the Saints.
- May 11. Latin Saints of the Orthodox Patriarchate of Rome.
- May 11. The Roman Martyrology.

Greek Sources

- Great Synaxaristes: (in Greek) 11 ΜΑΪΟΥ. ΜΕΓΑΣ ΣΥΝΑΞΑΡΙΣΤΗΣ
- (in Greek) Συναξαριστής. 11 Μαΐου. ECCLESIA.GR. (H ΕΚΚΛΗΣΙΑ ΤΗΣ ΕΛΛΑΔΟΣ).

Russian sources

- (in Russian) 24 мая (11 мая). Православная Энциклопедия под редакцией Патриарха Московского и всея Руси Кирилла (электронная версия). (Orthodox Encyclopedia – Pravenc.ru).
- (in Russian) 11 мая (ст.ст.) 24 мая 2013 (нов. ст.). Русская Православная Церковь Отдел внешних церковных связей. (DECR).
