= Evmenios Saridakis =

Greek Orthodox saint

Saint Evmenios Saridakis

Evmenios the New, Evmenios the Leper
- Born: 1 January 1931; Efia, Crete
- Residence: Athens, Greece
- Died: 23 May 1999
- Honored in: Eastern Orthodox Church
- Canonized: 14 April 2022 by the Ecumenical Patriarch
- Major shrine: St. Barbara Hospital for Infectious Diseases in Athens
- Feast: May 23
- Influences: Saint Nikephoros the Leper

Evmenios Saridakis (Greek: Ευμένιος Σαριδάκης), Evmenios the New or Evmenios the Leper was a Greek Orthodox elder in Athens who lived from 1 January 1931 to 23 May 1999. He was canonized as a saint in the Orthodox Church on 14 April 2022.

== Life ==
Elder Evmenios Saridakis was born Constantine Saridakis on 1 January 1931 in Ethia in the province of Monofatsi in Heraklion, Crete to George and Sofia Saridakis. Because he was the eighth and last child, and because of the Nazi occupation of Crete, Constantine did not receive an education. In 1951, he entered the monastery of the Great Martyr Niketas near his village and in three years was tonsured a monk at the age of seventeen with the name Sophronios.

In 1954, the monk Sophronios was drafted into the Greek military. After some time, he was diagnosed with leprosy and transferred to Thessaloniki and then to the suburbs of Athens to the St. Barbara Hospital for Infectious Diseases in Athens. Fr. Sophronios recovered fully but decided to remain at the hospital to tend to the other lepers. He remained there for the rest of his life, eventually becoming the spiritual father of the lepers.

Saint Nikephoros the Leper was transferred to the Athens hospital in 1957 and became the spiritual father of Fr. Sophronios until his repose in 1964. In 1975 at the age of forty-four Fr. Sophronios was ordained a priest with the name Evmenios. In 1992, Fr. Evmenios was awarded the rank of archimandrite and on 23 May 1999 he reposed. He was buried in the village where he was born.

=== Attestation of Saint Porphyrios ===
Saint Porphyrios of Kafsokalyvia, who sometimes went to Fr. Evmenios for confession, called him a “hidden saint of our days" and said that "he prays to God that he not be revealed to others but only at the end of his life will it be revealed." Furthermore, St. Porphyrios said, "Go and receive the blessing of Elder Evmenios, because he is the hidden Saint of our days. You can find someone like Elder Evmenios only every two hundred years."
