= Patricius of Bayeux =

6th-century French bishop

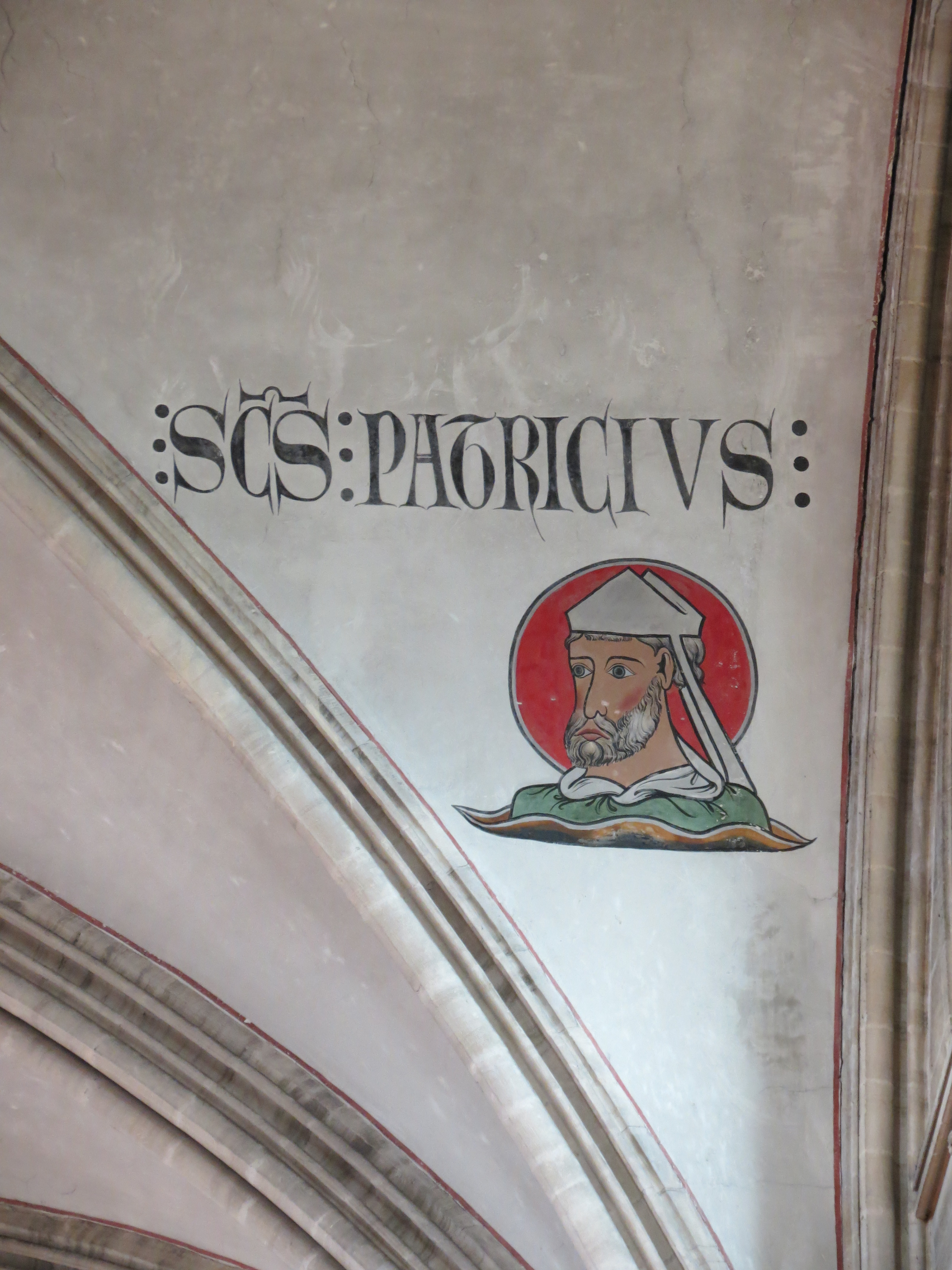
Peinture Saint-Patrice.

St. Patrice of Bayeux (Patricius) was the sixth bishop of Bayeux in the 5th century AD.

Patrice de Bayeux was born in Bayeux in the suburb that corresponds to the present district Saint-Patrice, in a rich and Christian family and would have received a religious education. On the death of his parents, he would have given all his belongings to the clergy and the poor and transformed his birth house into a church (on the site of the present-day Saint Patrice church, which has since been completely rebuilt). Hermant puts forward the hypothetical hypothesis that the successive English invasions suffered by Normandy and the city of Bayeux would have helped to replace his cult with that of his contemporary, Patrick of Ireland. The life of Patrice de Bayeux remains uncertain and incomplete. According to Patrice Lajoye, he could have been an abbot in Evrecy. It is not even certain that Patrice was really bishop of Bayeux, although he was represented alongside the other first bishops of Bayeux on the vaults of the cathedral. His relics were transported to the cathedral of Lisieux.
