= General Hospital of Western Attica "Agia Varvara" =

General Hospital of Western Attica "Agia Varvara" Γενικό Νοσοκομείο Δυτικής Αττικής "Αγία Βαρβάρα"

Geography
- Location: Agia Varvara, Attica, Greece

Organisation
- Care system: Publicly funded health care
- Type: Clinical

Services
- Emergency department: Yes

History
- Founded: 1903; 123 years ago
- Closed: 2013; 13 years ago

Links
- Lists: Hospitals in Greece

The General Hospital of Western Attica "Agia Varvara" is a former nursing institution located in the Municipality of the same name.

== History ==
It began its operation in 1903, under the name "Kantharos". Three years later it was renamed Hospital of Smallpox Patients (Ευλογιόντων). In 1970, it acquired another name as the Public Hospital of Infectious Diseases (Δημόσιο Νοσοκομείο Λοιμωδών Νόσων), which is still used today, while it received its final name in 1987. In 1995, the name of the city where it is located was added to the title. The Hospital belongs to the 2nd Health Region of Piraeus and Aegean.

In 2013, during the ministry of Adonis Georgiadis, the hospital ceased its operation as a tertiary hospital. The Artificial Kidney Unit and the regular outpatient clinics remained in operation in the building, while the majority of its staff was transferred to other hospitals. Furthermore, by a decision of the then Minister of Public Order, Nikos Dendias, it was planned to convert until then abandoned buildings near the hospital into accommodation centers for immigrants and vulnerable social groups. The change of use of the hospital's infrastructure caused reactions from the then opposition, local bodies, residents and staff.

In 2016, during the ministry of Andreas Xanthos, the following were transferred to his facilities: the Nice Prosthetic Center, the physical therapy clinic and the Mother, Child and Adolescent Protection Station that were located at the Nice Prosthetic Center.

During the coronavirus pandemic in Greece in 2020, it was converted into a hospital for the exclusive treatment of patients suffering from the coronavirus.
