= Saint Lydia =

Saint Lydia may refer to:

- Lydia of Thyatira, first recorded convert to Christianity in Europe
- See Philetus (martyr), for Lydia, 2nd-century Illyrian Christian martyr
