= April 5 (Eastern Orthodox liturgics) =

Day in the Eastern Orthodox liturgical calendar

Eastern Orthodox liturgical calendar
April 4	April 5	April 6
April 5 O.S. ≍ April 18 N.S. April 5 N.S ≍ March 23 O.S.

An Eastern Orthodox cross

April 5 in Eastern Orthodox liturgical calendars is a feast day and a day of commemoration of saints and martyrs. Although some Orthodox churches use the Revised Julian Calendar and others use the traditional Julian calendar, the fixed commemorations for their respective April 5 are broadly the same, no matter which calendar is used. (Note: Despite the dates being the same, the days to which they refer typically differ by 13 days. The notation Old Style or O.S. is sometimes used to indicate a date in the traditional Julian Calendar (the "Old Calendar"). The notation New Style or N.S. indicates a date in the Revised Julian calendar (the "New Calendar").)

== Saints ==
- Martyrs Claudius, Diodorus, Victor, Victorinus, Pappias, Serapion and Nicephorus, at Corinth (251 or 258) (Note: They are commemorated on January 31, their main feast day.)
- Martyrs Theodulus, Reader, and Agathopodes, Deacon, and those with them, at Thessaloniki (c. 303) (see also: April 4 - Greek)
- Martyrs Zenon, by fire, Maximus, Terentius and Pompeius, by the sword (250) (Note: "The same day, St. Zeno, martyr, who was flayed alive, besmeared with pitch, and then cast into the fire.") (see also: October 28, March 13, April 10)
- Martyr Thermos (Fermus, Firmus), by fire.
- The Holy Noble Lady (sister of martyr Thermos/Fermus), and her Servant, martyrs, by the sword.
- Holy Five Young Virgin-Martyrs of Lesbos, by the sword. (Note: On Mount Livanon (Lebanon) on Lesbos, there existed a convent dedicated to the Holy Five Martyrs, which was referenced in a Synodic decision of the year 1331.)
- Virgin-martyr Theodora and Martyr Didymus the Soldier, of Alexandria (304) (see also: May 27)
- Venerable Martyr Ypomoni (Hypomoni, Evpomoni). (Note: Her memory is recorded in the Vatopedi codex 1104 p.98b, and in the Synaxarion of Constantinople on April 9.)
- Venerable Publius of Egypt, monk (4th century) (see also: April 4 - Greek)
- Saints Theonas, Symeon, and Phorbinus, of Egypt (4th century) (see also: April 4 - Greek)
- Venerable Mark the Anchorite of Athens (ca. 400)
- Venerable Plato the Confessor, Abbot of the Studion (813) (see also: April 4 - Greek)
- Venerable Theodora of Thessaloniki (886)

== Pre-Schism Western saints ==
- Holy Martyrs of North-West Africa, a large group martyred at the Easter liturgy by Genseric, the Arian King of the Vandals (459) (Note: "In Africa, the holy martyrs, who, in the persecution of the Arian king Genseric, were murdered in the church on Easter day. The lector, whilst singing Alleluia at the stand, was pierced through the throat with an arrow.")
- Saint Bécán (Began), one of the 'Twelve Apostles of Ireland' (6th century) (Note: He was related to St Columba and founded a monastery in Kill-Beggan in Westmeath. He also gave his name to the church and parish of Imleach-Becain in Meath.)
- Venerable Derfel-Gadarn, a soldier and afterwards a hermit in Llanderfel in Gwynedd in Wales (6th century) (see also: April 6 - Greek)
- Saint Æthelburh of Kent (c. 647)

== Post-Schism Orthodox saints ==
- Saint Argyre the Neomartyr of Prussa (1721) (Note: The translation of her relics took place on April 30, 1725, and is celebrated on April 30.)
- New Martyr George of New Ephesus (1801)
- New Martyr Panagiotes of Jerusalem (1820) (Note: St Panagiotis was born in Peloponnesus, in his ignorance of Islamic law he entered the Mosque of Omar in Jerusalem and some fanatic Turks grabbed him and brought him before the Pasha of Damascus as a defiler of the Islamic temple. The Pasha offered him the chance of becoming a Muslim in order to avoid death. Panagiotis remained steadfast to his Christian faith, and for that reason he was beheaded on April 5, 1820, as he was chanting "Christ is Risen!" before several Muslims. He was 25 years old.)

=== New martyrs and confessors ===
- New Hieromartyr Alexis Krotenkov, Priest (1930)
- New Hieromartyr Nicholas Simo, Archpriest, of Kronstadt (1931)

== Other commemorations ==
- Translation of the relics (1652) of St. Job, Patriarch of Moscow (1607)
- Martyrdom of the Optina monastics (Optina martyrs) on Pascha (1993): (Note: See: (in Russian) Убийство монахов в Оптиной пустыни. Википедия (Russian Wikipedia).)

- Hieromonk Vasily (Roslyakov); with Riassaphore-monks Therapontus (Pushkarev), and Trophimus (Tatarinov).

- Repose of Righteous Symeon Klimych (1837)
- Repose of Elder Philemon of Valaam and Jordanville (1953)

== Icon gallery ==
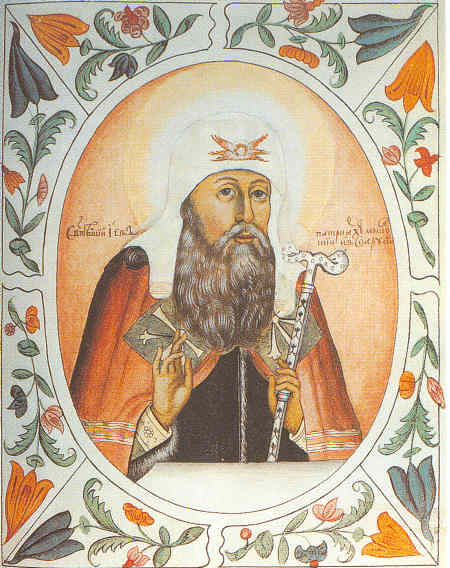
Patriarch Job of Moscow.

== Sources ==
- April 5 / April 18. Orthodox Calendar (pravoslavie.ru).
- April 18 / April 5. Holy Trinity Russian Orthodox Church (A parish of the Patriarchate of Moscow).
- April 5. OCA - The Lives of the Saints.
- The Autonomous Orthodox Metropolia of Western Europe and the Americas. St. Hilarion Calendar of Saints for the year of our Lord 2004. St. Hilarion Press (Austin, TX). p. 26.
- April 5. Latin Saints of the Orthodox Patriarchate of Rome.
- The Roman Martyrology. Transl. by the Archbishop of Baltimore. Last Edition, According to the Copy Printed at Rome in 1914. Revised Edition, with the Imprimatur of His Eminence Cardinal Gibbons. Baltimore: John Murphy Company, 1916. pp. 96–97.
- Rev. Richard Stanton. A Menology of England and Wales, or, Brief Memorials of the Ancient British and English Saints Arranged According to the Calendar, Together with the Martyrs of the 16th and 17th Centuries. London: Burns & Oates, 1892. pp. 144–145.

Greek Sources

- Great Synaxaristes: (in Greek) 5 Απριλίου. Μεγασ Συναξαριστησ.
- (in Greek) Συναξαριστής. 5 Απριλίου. ecclesia.gr. (H Εκκλησια Τησ Ελλαδοσ).

Russian Sources

- (in Russian) 18 апреля (5 апреля). Православная Энциклопедия под редакцией Патриарха Московского и всея Руси Кирилла (электронная версия). (Orthodox Encyclopedia - Pravenc.ru).
- (in Russian) 18 апреля 2013 (нов. ст.). Русская Православная Церковь Отдел внешних церковных связей.
