= April 10 (Eastern Orthodox liturgics) =

Day in the Eastern Orthodox liturgical calendar

Eastern Orthodox liturgical calendar
April 9	April 10	April 11
April 10 O.S. ≍ April 23 N.S. April 10 N.S ≍ March 28 O.S.

An Eastern Orthodox cross

April 10 in Eastern Orthodox liturgical calendars is a feast day and a day of commemoration of saints and martyrs. Although some Orthodox churches use the Revised Julian Calendar and others use the traditional Julian calendar, the fixed commemorations for their respective April 10 are broadly the same, no matter which calendar is used. (Note: Despite the dates being the same, the days to which they refer typically differ by 13 days. The notation Old Style or O.S. is sometimes used to indicate a date in the traditional Julian Calendar (the "Old Calendar"). The notation New Style or N.S. indicates a date in the Revised Julian calendar (the "New Calendar").)

== Saints ==
- Prophetess Huldah (Olda) (IV Kings 22:14)
- Martyrs Terence, Africanus, Maximus, Pompeius, and 36 others, including Zeno, Alexander, and Theodore, at Carthage (250) (Note: Terence, Africanus, Pompeius and Companions: A group of fifty martyrs, imprisoned with snakes and scorpions and finally beheaded in Carthage in North Africa under Decius.) (Note: Name days celebrated today include: Anaximenes (Ἀναξιμένης); Demosthenes (Δημοσθένης); Epaminondas (Ἐπαμεινώνδας); Eteocles (Ἐτεοκλής); Heracles (Ἠρακλῆς); Theseus (Θησέας); Isocrates (Ἰσοκράτης); Makarios (Μακάριος); Homer (Ὅμηρος); Parmenion (Παρμενίων); Pelopidas (Πελοπίδας); Pericles (Περικλῆς); Polybius (Πολύβιος); Polynikos (Πολύνικος); Prometheus (Προμηθέας); Sophocles (Σοφοκλῆς); Philopoimen (Φιλοποίμην); Fokion (Φωκίων).) (see also: October 28, March 13, April 5)
- Saint Miltiades, Pope of Rome (314) (Note: Name days celebrated today include: Miltiades (Μιλτιάδης).)
- Hieromartyrs James the Presbyter, and the Deacons Azadanes and Abdicius, of Persia (c. 380)

== Pre-Schism Western saints ==
- Martyrs of Rome (c. 115) (Note: A number of criminals baptised by Pope Alexander during his imprisonment. They were taken to Ostia near Rome and put on board a boat which was then scuttled.) (Note: "At Rome, the birthday of many holy martyrs, whom pope St. Alexander baptized whilst he was detained in prison. The prefect Aurelian had them all put in an old ship, taken to the deep sea, and plunged into it with stones tied to their necks.")
- Saint Palladius, Abbot of St Germanus in Auxerre, he became bishop there and founded several monasteries (661)
- Martyrs Beocca, Ethor and others, at Chertsey Abbey, by the Danes (869) (Note: In their onslaught on England, the Danes attacked monasteries in particular. They martyred Sts Beocca, Abbot, Ethor, monk-priest and some ninety monks at Chertsey in Surrey; at Peterborough they martyred St Hedda, Abbot, and others at his monastery; at Thorney, St Torthred and others.)
- Saint Bede the Younger, a court official who became a monk at the monastery of Gavello near Rovigo (883)
- Saint Macarius of Antioch (1012) (Note: Born in Antioch, he was a bishop who travelled westwards as a pilgrim and was received by monks at the monastery of St Bavo in Ghent in Belgium.)

== Post-Schism Orthodox saints ==
- The Holy Martyrs of Kvabtakhevi Monastery, Georgia, who suffered during the invasion of Tamerlane (1386)
- Nun-martyr Anastasia, Abbess, and 34 nuns with her, of Uglich (1609)
- Venerable martyrs of the Daou Penteli Monastery, in Penteli, by Algerian pirate raiders, (end-17th century) (Note: The Monastery lies on the eastern slope of Penteli, on the road to Rafina-Pikermi, near a ravine. It is a monastic complex consisting of the katholikon, the cells, the Refectory, a fountain and a Byzantine defense tower in the entrance gate. The Monastery was destroyed in the end of the 17th century by Algerian pirates’ raids, who slaughtered the monks, whose heads and relics are displayed in a building of the monastic complex.: See also: (in Greek) Νταού Πεντέλης Αττικής. Βικιπαίδεια. (Greek Wikipedia).)
- New Martyr George of Cyprus, at Acre, Palestine (1753)
- New Martyr Demos (Demetrios) of Smyrna (1763) (Note: Name days celebrated today include: Demos (Δῆμος).)
- New Hieromartyr Gregory V, Ecumenical Patriarch of Constantinople (1821) (Note: "The holy patriarch-martyr was hanged over the door to the Phanarion and later his body was thrown into the Bosphoros. Ukrainian sailors retrieved his body, thinking him to have been a priest martyred by the Turks. At Odesa, he was positively identified as the patriarch and enshrined there until his glorification as a sainted hieromartyr and return to Athens where he is now enshrined. The Ukrainian Orthodox Church has placed his name in its own calendar, especially owing to his great veneration by Ukrainians. The translation of his relics took place on 25/4/1871.")
- Seven Hieromartyr Bishops, arrested together with Ecumenical Patriarch Gregory V, subsequently martyred by the Ottoman Turks at the start of the Greek War of Independence (1821): (Note: On the occasion of the two hundred years since the martyrdom of Patriarch Gregory I on 10 April 1821, with the recommendation of the Accompanying Committee on Legal and Doctrinal Issues, and on the proposals of the Most Reverend Metropolitans Chrysostomos of Patras, Theophilos of Lefkados and Ithaca, and Markos of Chios, Psara and Oinousses, the Permanent Holy Synod of the Church of Greece decided to inscribe in the hagiological lists of the church seven other hierarchs who were arrested together with Patriarch Gregory V on the same day, and were subsequently hanged, confessing the faith.)

- Eugenios of Anchialos. (Note: See also: (in Greek) Ευγένιος Καραβίας. Βικιπαίδεια. (Greek Wikipedia).)
- Iosif of Thessaloniki. (Note: See also: (in Greek) Ιωσήφ Αντωνόπουλος. Βικιπαίδεια. (Greek Wikipedia).) (see also: June 3)
- Gregorios of Derkoi. (Note: See also: (in Greek) Γρηγόριος ο Δέρκων. Βικιπαίδεια. (Greek Wikipedia).) (see also: June 3)
- Dionysios of Ephesus. (Note: See also: (in Greek) Διονύσιος Καλλιάρχης. Βικιπαίδεια. (Greek Wikipedia).)
- Dorotheos of Andrianople. (Note: See also: (in Greek) Δωρόθεος Πρώιος. Βικιπαίδεια. (Greek Wikipedia).) (see also: June 3)
- Athanasios of Nicomedia. (Note: See also: (in Greek) Αθανάσιος Νικομηδείας. Βικιπαίδεια. (Greek Wikipedia).)
- Ioannichios of Tarnovo. (Note: See also: (in Bulgarian) Йоаникий Търновски. Уикипедия. (Bulgarian Wikipedia).)

- New Monk-martyr Chrysanthus of Xenophontos monastery, Mt. Athos, on Pascha (1821)

=== New martyrs and confessors ===
- New Hieromartyr Flegont Pongilsky, Archpriest, of Yaroslavl (1938) (Note: See: (in Russian) Понгильский, Флегонт Николаевич. Википедии. (Russian Wikipedia).)
- Martyr Demetrius Vdovin (1942)

== Other commemorations ==
- Consecration of Ioasaph (Bolotov) as Bishop of Kodiak, Alaska (1799)

== Icon gallery ==
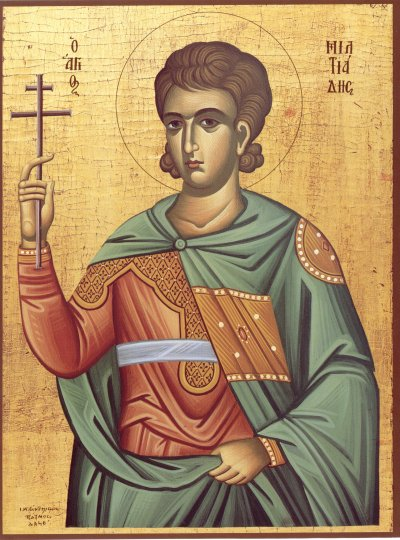
Icon of Saint Miltiades, Pope of Rome.

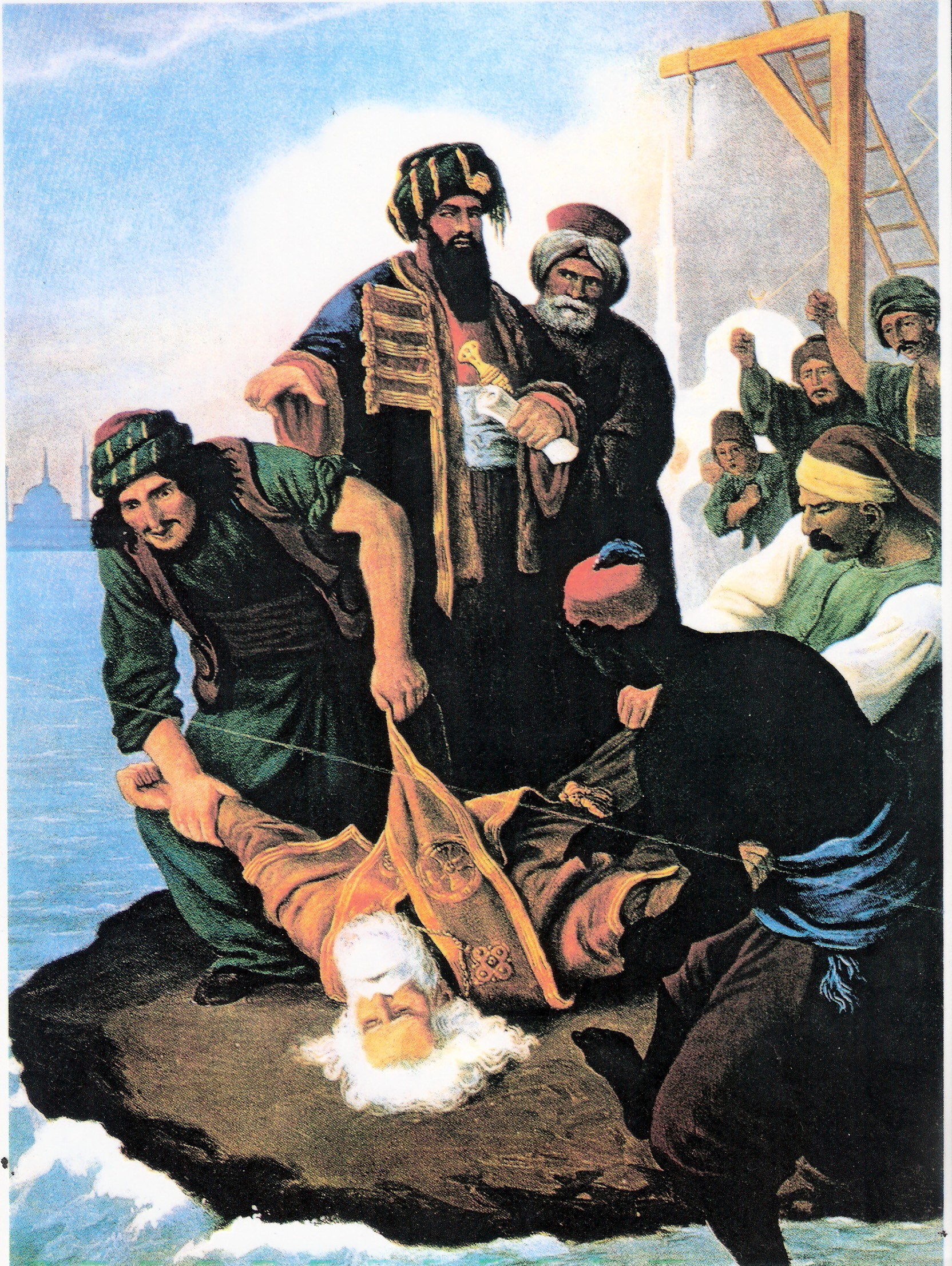
Hanging of Patriarch Gregory V of Constantinople.

== Sources ==
- April 10 / April 23. Orthodox Calendar (pravoslavie.ru).
- April 23 / April 10. Holy Trinity Russian Orthodox Church (A parish of the Patriarchate of Moscow).
- April 10. OCA - The Lives of the Saints.
- The Autonomous Orthodox Metropolia of Western Europe and the Americas. St. Hilarion Calendar of Saints for the year of our Lord 2004. St. Hilarion Press (Austin, TX). pp. 27–28.
- April 10. Latin Saints of the Orthodox Patriarchate of Rome.
- The Roman Martyrology. Transl. by the Archbishop of Baltimore. Last Edition, According to the Copy Printed at Rome in 1914. Revised Edition, with the Imprimatur of His Eminence Cardinal Gibbons. Baltimore: John Murphy Company, 1916. p. 101.
- Rev. Richard Stanton. A Menology of England and Wales, or, Brief Memorials of the Ancient British and English Saints Arranged According to the Calendar, Together with the Martyrs of the 16th and 17th Centuries. London: Burns & Oates, 1892. p. 151.

Greek Sources

- Great Synaxaristes: (in Greek) 10 Απριλιου. Μεγασ Συναξαριστησ.
- (in Greek) Συναξαριστής. 10 Απριλίου. ecclesia.gr. (H Εκκλησια Τησ Ελλαδοσ).

Russian Sources

- (in Russian) 23 апреля (10 апреля). Православная Энциклопедия под редакцией Патриарха Московского и всея Руси Кирилла (электронная версия). (Orthodox Encyclopedia - Pravenc.ru).
- (in Russian) 10 апреля (ст.ст.) 23 апреля 2013 (нов. ст.). Русская Православная Церковь Отдел внешних церковных связей.
