= Cronides =

Cronides (Greek: Κρονίδης) may refer to:

- Cronides, an epithet of Zeus
- Cronides (died 121), a saint martyred with Philetus
