= March 22 (Eastern Orthodox liturgics) =

Day in the Eastern Orthodox liturgical calendar

Eastern Orthodox liturgical calendar
March 21	March 22	March 23
March 22 O.S. ≍ April 4 N.S. March 22 N.S ≍ March 9 O.S.

An Eastern Orthodox cross

March 22 in Eastern Orthodox liturgical calendars is a feast day and a day of commemoration of saints and martyrs. Although some Orthodox churches use the Revised Julian Calendar and others use the traditional Julian calendar, the fixed commemorations for their respective March 22 are broadly the same, no matter which calendar is used. (Note: Despite the dates being the same, the days to which they refer typically differ by 13 days. The notation Old Style or O.S. is sometimes used to indicate a date in the traditional Julian Calendar (the "Old Calendar"). The notation New Style or N.S. indicates a date in the Revised Julian calendar (the "New Calendar").)

== Saints ==
- Virgin-confessor Drosida (Drosis) of Antioch, daughter of Emperor Trajan, and with her five Virgin-martyrs (104-117) (see also: July 28)
- Martyrs Kalliniki and Vasilissa of Rome (252)
- Hieromartyr Basil of Ancyra, Priest of Ancyra (362)
- Saint Isaac the Confessor, founder of the Dalmatian Monastery at Constantinople (383) (see also: May 30)

== Pre-Schism Western saints ==
- Saint Epaphroditus, by tradition the first Bishop of Terracina in Italy (1st century) (Note: He may have been one of the Seventy Apostles and mentioned by the Apostle Paul in Philippians 2:25), commemorated on March 30.)
- Saint Paul, Bishop of Narbonne, Brittany (3rd century) (Note: "AT Narbonne, in France, the birthday of the bishop St. Paul, a disciple of the Apostles. He is said to have been the proconsul Sergius Paulus, who was baptized by the blessed Apostle Paul, and left at Narbonne, where he was raised to the episcopal dignity when the apostle went to Spain. Having zealously discharged the office of preaching and performed miracles, he departed for heaven.")
- Saint Lea of Rome, an aristocrat in Rome who on the death of her husband entered the convent of St Marcella (384)
- Saint Deogratius, Bishop of Carthage in North Africa (457)
- Saint Octavian and Companions, Archdeacon of the Church in Carthage in North Africa, martyred with several thousand companions under the Arian Vandal King Hunneric (484)
- Saint Saturninus and Companions, a group of ten martyrs in North Africa.
- Saint Trien (Trienan), a disciple of St Patrick and Abbot of Killelga in Ireland (5th century)
- Saint Darerca of Ireland, sister of St Patrick of Ireland (5th century) (Note: She is reputed to have had fifteen sons, some ten of whom became bishops.)
- Saint Fáilbe mac Pípáin, the eighth Abbot of Iona in Scotland (680) (Note: He came from Ireland and was the brother of St Finan of Rath.)

== Post-Schism Orthodox saints ==
- Martyr Basil of Mangazea in Siberia, Wonderworker (1602) (Note: See: (in Russian) Василий Мангазейский. Википедии. Russian Wikipedia.) (Note: (in Russian) "Сначала днем памяти святого было 22 марта, когда святая Церковь вспоминала соименного ему священномученика Василия Анкирского. В последующее время память блаженного Василия стала совершаться и 10 мая — в память о перенесении его мощей из Мангазеи. Ранее память святому совершалась в монастыре еще и 6 июня, день явления его мощей (по другим источникам, кончина св. Мученика Василия Мангазейского приходится на 4 апреля 1602 года).) (see also: June 6 and May 10 - Translation of Relics)
- New Monk-martyr Euthymius of Dimitsana and Mt. Athos, at Constantinople (1814)

=== New martyrs and confessors ===
- Hieromartyr Basil (Zelentsov), Bishop of Prilutsk, Vicar of Poltava (1930) (Note: See: (in Russian) Василий (Зеленцов). Википедии. Russian Wikipedia.) (see also: January 25)
- New Confessor Schema-abbess Sophia (Grineva) of Kiev (1941), and her priest Demetrius Ivanov (1934)

== Other commemorations ==
- "The Izborsk" Icon of the Mother of God (1657)
- Uncovering of the relics (2026) of Saint Chrysostomos Papasarantopoulos the Missionary (1972), in the city of Kananga in the Democratic Republic of the Congo. (see also: December 29)
- Commemoration of Maria Berushko of Brazil and eight students who died trying to save people during a fire in their school (1986)

== Icon gallery ==
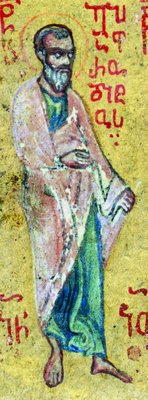
Saint Epaphroditus.

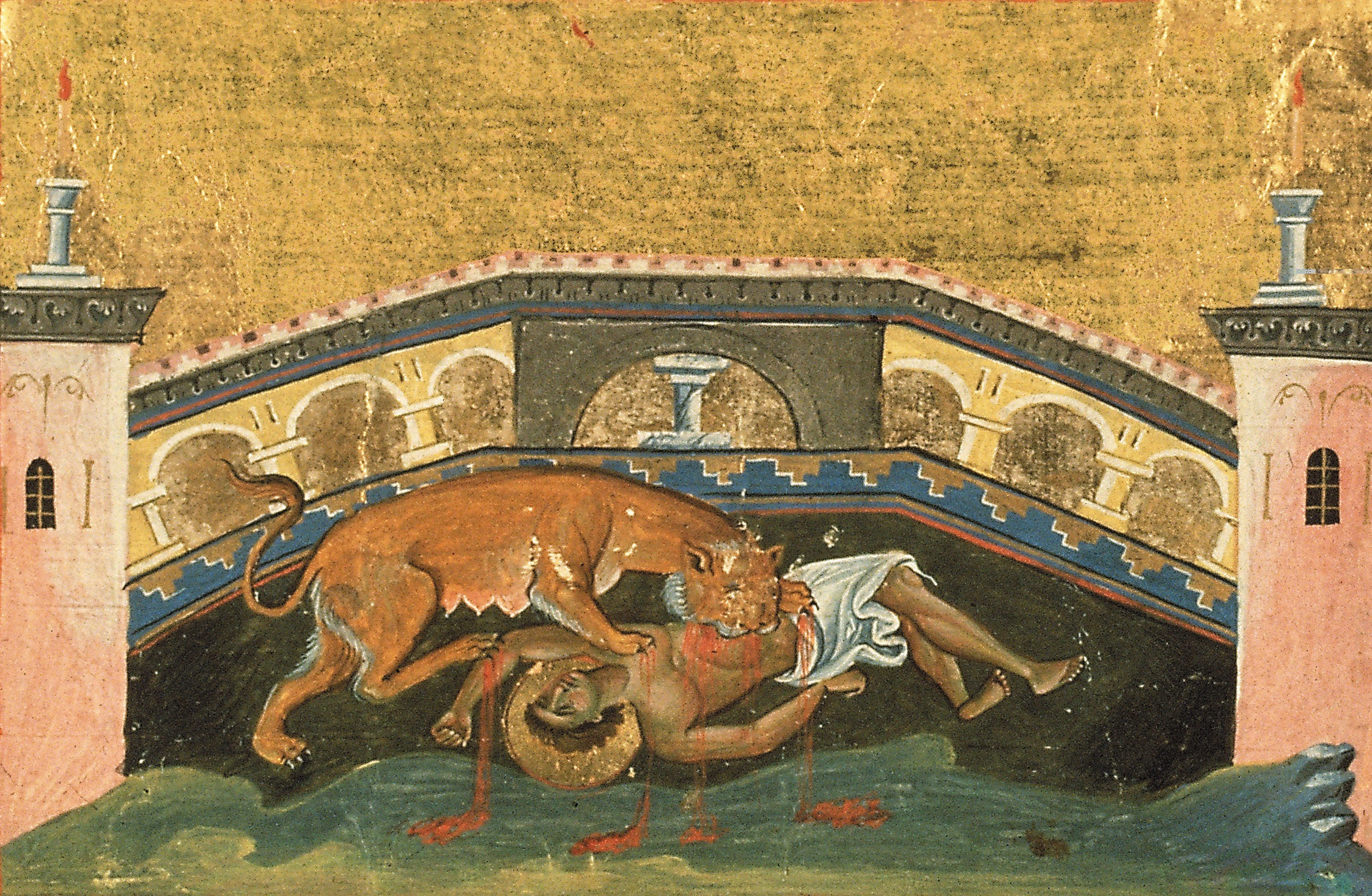
Hieromartyr Basil of Ancyra.

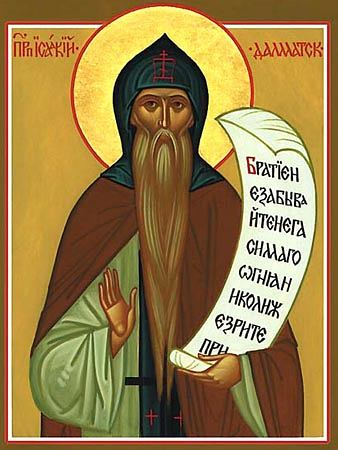
Saint Isaac the Confessor.

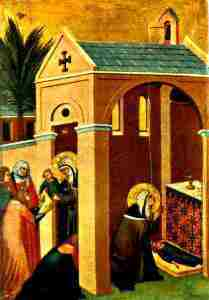
Saint Lea of Rome.

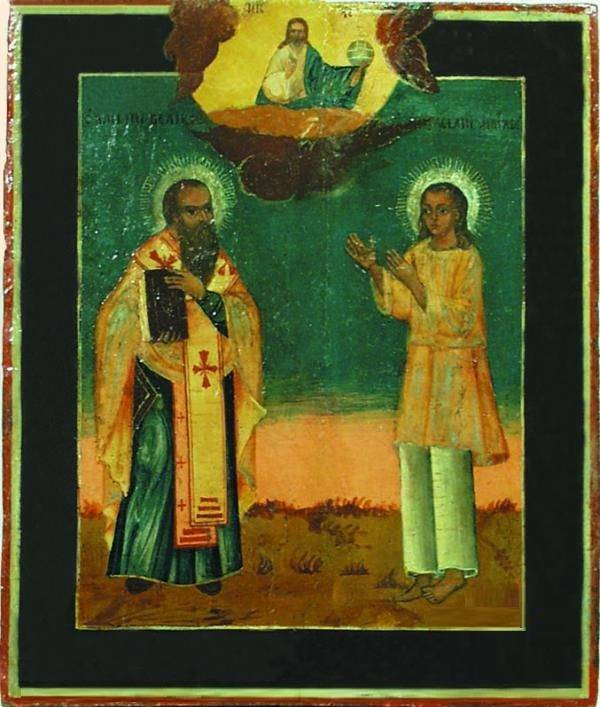
Basil of Caesarea and Basil of Mangazeya.

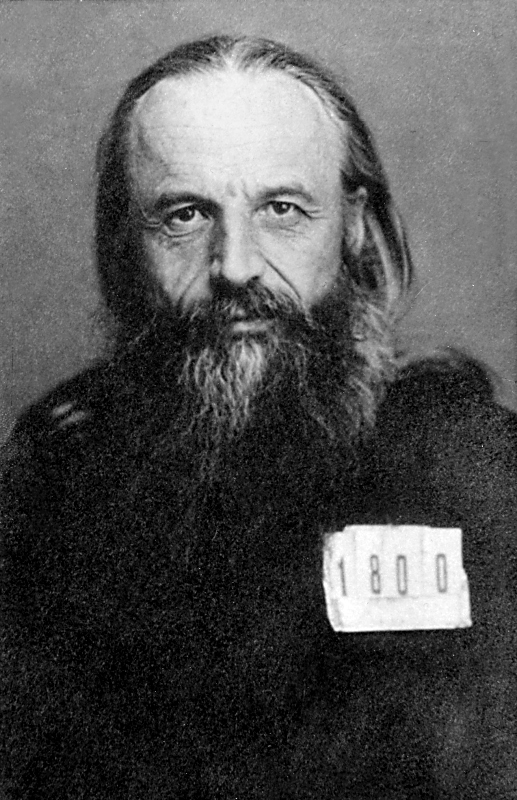
Hieromartyr Basil (Zelentsov), Bishop of Prilutsk, Vicar of Poltava.

== Sources ==
- March 22/April 4. Orthodox Calendar (PRAVOSLAVIE.RU).
- April 4 / March 22. HOLY TRINITY RUSSIAN ORTHODOX CHURCH (A parish of the Patriarchate of Moscow).
- March 22. OCA - The Lives of the Saints.
- The Autonomous Orthodox Metropolia of Western Europe and the Americas (ROCOR). St. Hilarion Calendar of Saints for the year of our Lord 2004. St. Hilarion Press (Austin, TX). p. 23.
- March 22. Latin Saints of the Orthodox Patriarchate of Rome.
- The Roman Martyrology. Transl. by the Archbishop of Baltimore. Last Edition, According to the Copy Printed at Rome in 1914. Revised Edition, with the Imprimatur of His Eminence Cardinal Gibbons. Baltimore: John Murphy Company, 1916. pp. 83–84.

Greek Sources

- Great Synaxaristes: (in Greek) 22 ΜΑΡΤΙΟΥ. ΜΕΓΑΣ ΣΥΝΑΞΑΡΙΣΤΗΣ.
- (in Greek) Συναξαριστής. 22 Μαρτίου. ECCLESIA.GR. (H ΕΚΚΛΗΣΙΑ ΤΗΣ ΕΛΛΑΔΟΣ).

Russian Sources

- (in Russian) 4 апреля (22 марта). Православная Энциклопедия под редакцией Патриарха Московского и всея Руси Кирилла (электронная версия). (Orthodox Encyclopedia - Pravenc.ru).
- (in Russian) 22 марта (ст.ст.) 4 апреля 2013 (нов. ст.). Русская Православная Церковь Отдел внешних церковных связей. (DECR).
