= October 28 (Eastern Orthodox liturgics) =

Day in the Eastern Orthodox liturgical calendar

Eastern Orthodox liturgical calendar
October 27	October 28	October 29
October 28 O.S. ≍ November 10 N.S. October 28 N.S ≍ October 15 O.S.

An Eastern Orthodox cross

October 28 in Eastern Orthodox liturgical calendars is a feast day and a day of commemoration of saints and martyrs. Although some Orthodox churches use the Revised Julian Calendar and others use the traditional Julian calendar, the fixed commemorations for their respective October 28 are broadly the same, no matter which calendar is used. (Note: Despite the dates being the same, the days to which they refer typically differ by 13 days. The notation Old Style or O.S. is sometimes used to indicate a date in the traditional Julian Calendar (the "Old Calendar"). The notation New Style or N.S. indicates a date in the Revised Julian calendar (the "New Calendar").)

== Feasts ==
- The Protection of Our Most Holy Lady Theotokos and Ever-Virgin Mary, at the Blachernae church in Constantinople (911). (Note: Because of the many miracles of the Holy Virgin which were reported by Greek soldiers during the Greco-Italian War of 1940-1941, the Holy Synod of the Church of Greece decided in 1952 to commemorate the feast day of The Protection of the Mother of God on October 28th, rather than on the traditional date of October 1. Thus, the feast of the Protection of the Mother of God was made to coincide on October 28th with Ohi Day in Greece — ((in Greek) «'Οχι»), the Anniversary of the "No" — which is celebrated throughout Greece, Cyprus and in Greek communities around the world in commemoration of the rejection by Greek Prime Minister Ioannis Metaxas of the ultimatum made by Italian dictator Benito Mussolini on October 28, 1940. (See also: Greco-Italian War and the Battle of Greece).) (Church of Greece only. See also: October 1 - traditional date)

== Saints ==
- Martyrs Terence and Neonilla, of Syria, and their children (249):

- Sarbelus, Photus, Theodulus, Hierax, Nitus, Bele, and Eunice

- Great-martyr Paraskevi of Iconium (3rd century)
- Venerable Saints Firmilian, Bishop of Caesarea in Cappadocia (c. 269), and Malchion, priest of Antioch (late 3rd century)
- Hieromartyr Cyriacus, Chorepiscopus of Jerusalem, and his mother, Martyr Anna (both 363) (Note: "Commemorated in the Menology of Basil as a man of Jerusalem, who discovered the true cross, and showed it to Helena, and was thereby converted, and became Patriarch of Jerusalem; and was martyred along with his mother by Julian the Apostate, his right hand being first cut off because his writings had made so many converts. He is unknown to history.") (see also: October 18)
- Venerable Diomedes the Young, of Cyprus, Wonderworker (c. 4th century)
- Saint Abramius of Ephesus, Bishop of Ephesus (6th century) (Note: He followed the monastic life and became Bishop of Ephesus after 533. He is identified with the homonym "Abba", quoted by John Moschos (PG 87, 2956), of the Monasteries of Avraamiton (Constantinople) and of Byzantion (Jerusalem). Two homilies that are attributed to him have survived - "for the Annunciation" and "for the Ypapantin" - which were published in 1913 by M. Kraschaninnikov and M. Jugie, and are of great importance for patristic studies.)
- Saint Febronia (632), daughter of Emperor Heraclius.
- Venerable Stephen of Mar Sabbas monastery in Palestine, hymnographer (807)
- Saint John the Chozebite, Bishop of Caesarea in Palestine (532) (see also: October 3 - Greek)
- Hieromartyr Neophytus, bishop of Urbnisi, Georgia (7th century)

== Pre-Schism Western saints ==
- Martyrs Terence, Africanus, Maximus, Pompeius, and 36 others, at Carthage (250) (see also: March 13, April 5, April 10)
- Martyrs Anastasia and Cyril, early martyrs in Rome (c. 253) (Note: The former was bound with chains in Valerian's persecution under the Prefect Probus, tortured, her breasts cut off, her nails torn out, her teeth broken, her hands and feet cut off, and being beheaded, she passed to her Bridegroom; Cyril, who offered her water when she begged for it, received martydom as his reward.) (see also: October 29 - East)
- Martyr Cyrilla, the daughter of St Tryphonia (c. 268) (Note: They were both famed for their almsgiving and generosity. She was martyred under the Emperor Claudius II.) (Note: "At Rome, in the reign of Claudius, St. Cyrilla, virgin, daughter of St. Tryphonia, who was pierced through the throat for the faith of Christ.")
- Martyr Fidelis of Como, an Italian soldier-saint, martyred in Lombardy under Maximian Herculeus (304)
- Saint Honoratus of Vercelli, Bishop of Vercelli (c. 415) (Note: Born in Vercelli in Italy, he was trained in the monastic life by St Eusebius. He accompanied his master into exile in Scythopolis and in his wanderings through Cappadocia, Egypt and Illyria. In 396 he was chosen bishop of Vercelli on the recommendation of St Ambrose, whom he anointed on his deathbed.)
- Saint Ferrutius of Mainz, Germany. (Note: A soldier in Mainz in Germany, he asked to be discharged rather than take part in idolatry. He was thrown into prison where he died of ill-treatment and hunger.)
- Saint Salvius (Saire), a hermit in France who lived at the place now called Saint-Saire after him (6th century)
- Saint Faro, Bishop of Meaux in France (626), he greatly encouraged monasticism, confessor (675)
- Saint Godwin of Stavelot, Abbot of the monastery of Stavelot-Malmédy in Belgium (c. 690)
- Saint Dorbheneus (Dorbhene), Abbot of Iona (713) (Note: Abbot of Iona, he was descended from a brother of St Columba. A copy of St Adamnan's Life of the latter, written by St Dorbhene, still exists.)
- Saint Anglinus, tenth Abbot of Stavelot-Malmédy near Liège in Belgium (c. 768)
- Saint Alberic, Abbot of Stavelot-Malmédy in Belgium (779) (Note: His feast is kept together with that of four other Abbots of the same monastery.)
- Saint Remigius of Lyon, Archbishop of Lyon in France (875)
- Saint Eadsin (Eadsige), thirty-third Archbishop of Canterbury, England, who Crowned King Edward the Confessor (1050) (Note: "EADSIN, who is also called EDSIUS and EDSIGE, was chaplain to the Danish King Harold, and was consecrated Bishop of Winchester. On the death of Ethelnoth, he was promoted to the Metropolitan See of Canterbury, where he was held in great veneration for his piety and his services in the cause of religion. When the Danish line closed with the death of Hardicanute, Eadsin laboured much and successfully for the restoration of the English succession, and had the consolation of crowning with his own hands St. Edward the Confessor in Winchester Cathedral. The holy man, in consequence of failing health, resigned his archbishopric some years before his death, and gave up his soul to God, with the reputation of great sanctity, in the year of Christ 1050, on the 28th October.")

== Post-Schism Orthodox saints ==
- Saint Arsenius of Srem, Archbishop of Serbia (1266)
- Venerable Athanasius I, Patriarch of Constantinople (Mount Athos) (1340) (see also: October 24)
- Saint Theophano Basarab, first known Romanian nun (1352) (Note: "The Holy Synod of the Romanian Orthodox Church announced on Thursday the canonization of Venerable Theopahno Basarab from Albotina monastery (Vidin), a contemporary with St. Gregory Palamas and disciple of St. Theodosius the Hesychast." Troparion, Tone 5: "On the chosen branch of the Basarab family, who, through her holy life, shone wonderfully, like a worthy guide of Bulgaria, and, receiving the angelic schema, for a long time she laboured in vigil and fasting, the Venerable Theophano, now let us honour her rightfully.")
- Saint Hyacinth of Vicina, Metropolitan of Wallachia (1372) (Note: On 9 July 2008, the Romanian Orthodox Church placed him among the saints, being celebrated on 28 October.) (Note: See: (in Romanian) Iachint de Vicina. Wikipedia. (Romanian Wikipedia).)
- Saint Nestor (not the Chronicler) of the Kiev Caves (14th century)
- Righteous Virgin Parasceva of Pirimin on the Pinega River (Arkhangelsk) (16th century)
- Venerable Job of Pochayiv, Abbot and Wonderworker of Pochaev (1651) (Note: The uncovering of St Job’s relics took place on August 28, 1659. There was a second uncovering of the relics on August 27–28, 1833.)
- Saint Demetrius of Rostov, Metropolitan of Rostov (1709)
- New Martyrs Angelis, Manuel, George, and Nicholas, at Rethymno on Crete (1824)
- Repose of St. Theophilus, Fool-for-Christ, of Kiev (1853)
- Venerable Arsenios the Cappadocian (1924) (See also: November 10 - Greek)

=== New martyrs and confessors ===
- New Hieromartyr John Vilensky, Priest of Yaroslavl-Rostov (1918) (see also: May 3)
- Venerable New Hieromartyr Genadius Parfent'ev, Archmandrite of Yaransk (1919)
- New Hieromartyr Michael Lektorsky, Archpriest of Kuban (1921)

== Other commemorations ==
- Synaxis of the Shrine of Panagia Eleftherotria ("Our Lady of Deliverance") of Athens, Greece. (Note: The Shrine of Panagia Eleftherotria ("Our Lady of Deliverance") is located in the Kifisia district of Athens, in the Metropolis of Kifissia, Amaroussion and Oropos (formerly the Metropolis of Attica). She is the Patroness Saint of Athens (Gr.: Παναγία Ελευθερώτρια (Πολιούχος της Αθήνας)). Note, there is another different icon of the Theotokos "the Deliverer", which is commemorated on April 4.)
- Synaxis of the Church of Panagia Eleftherotria ("Our Lady of Deliverance") of Didymoteicho, Greece.
- Synaxis of the Icon of Panagia Ponolytrias of Serres, Greece.
- Repose of Elder Epiphanius (Theodoropoulos) of Athens (1989)

== Icon gallery ==
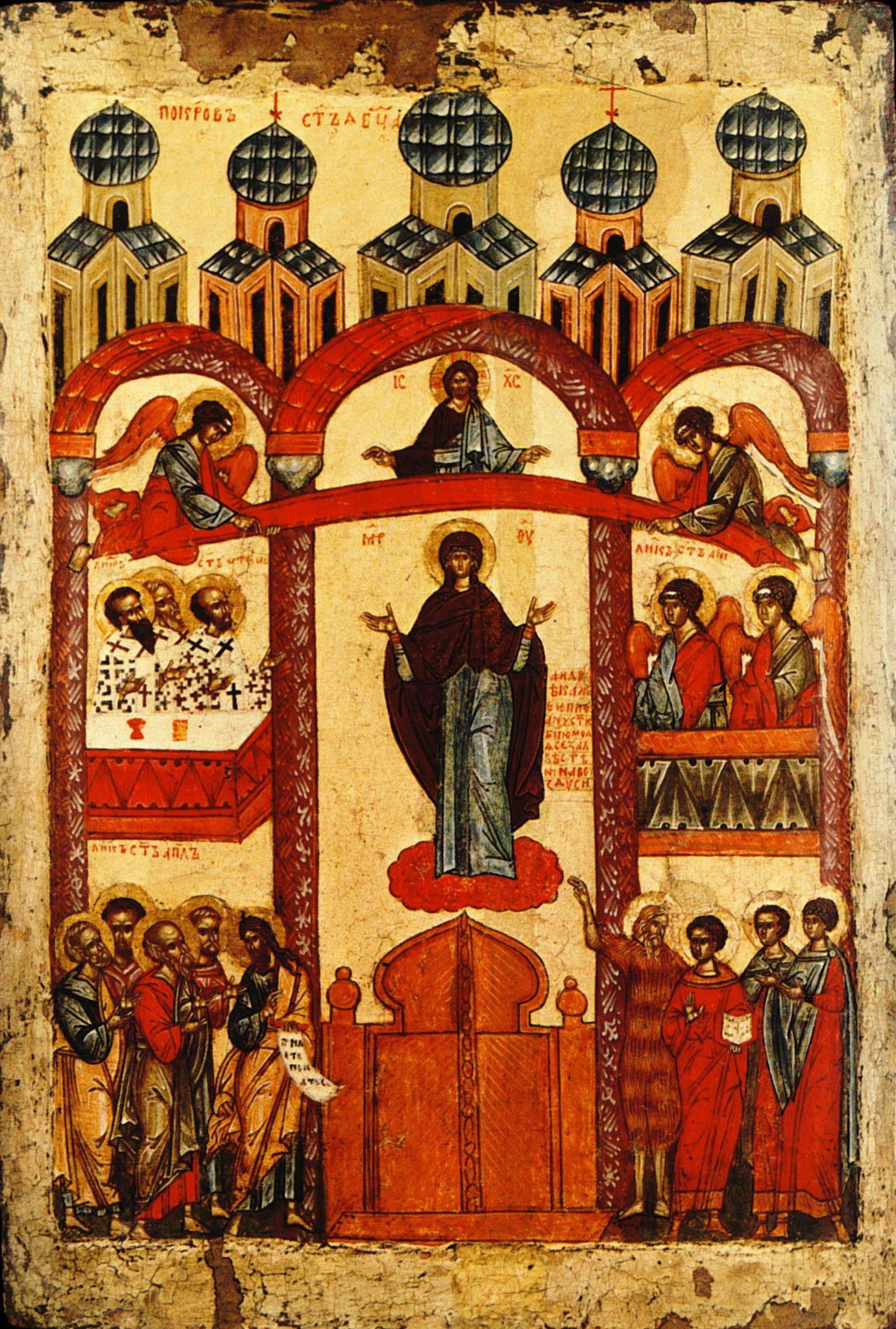
The Protection of Our Most Holy Lady Theotokos (Novgorod Icon, 1401–1425).

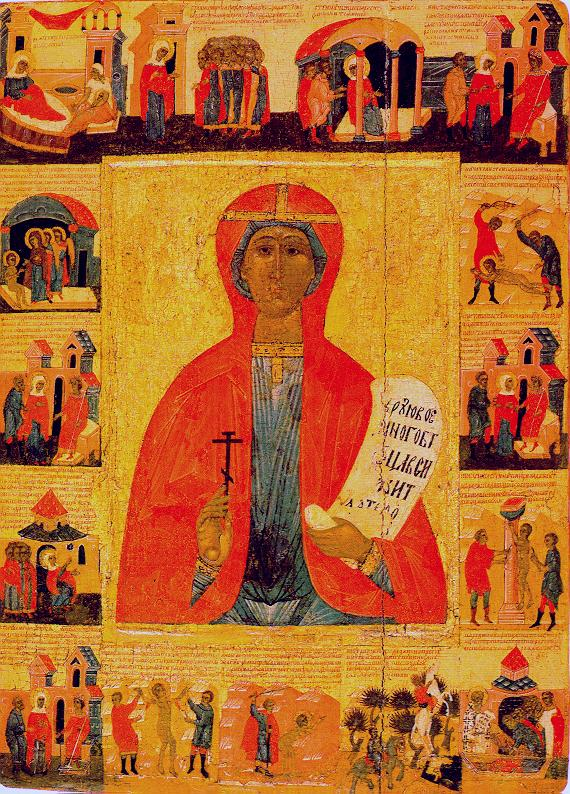
Scenes from the Life of St. Paraskeva. Russian icon.

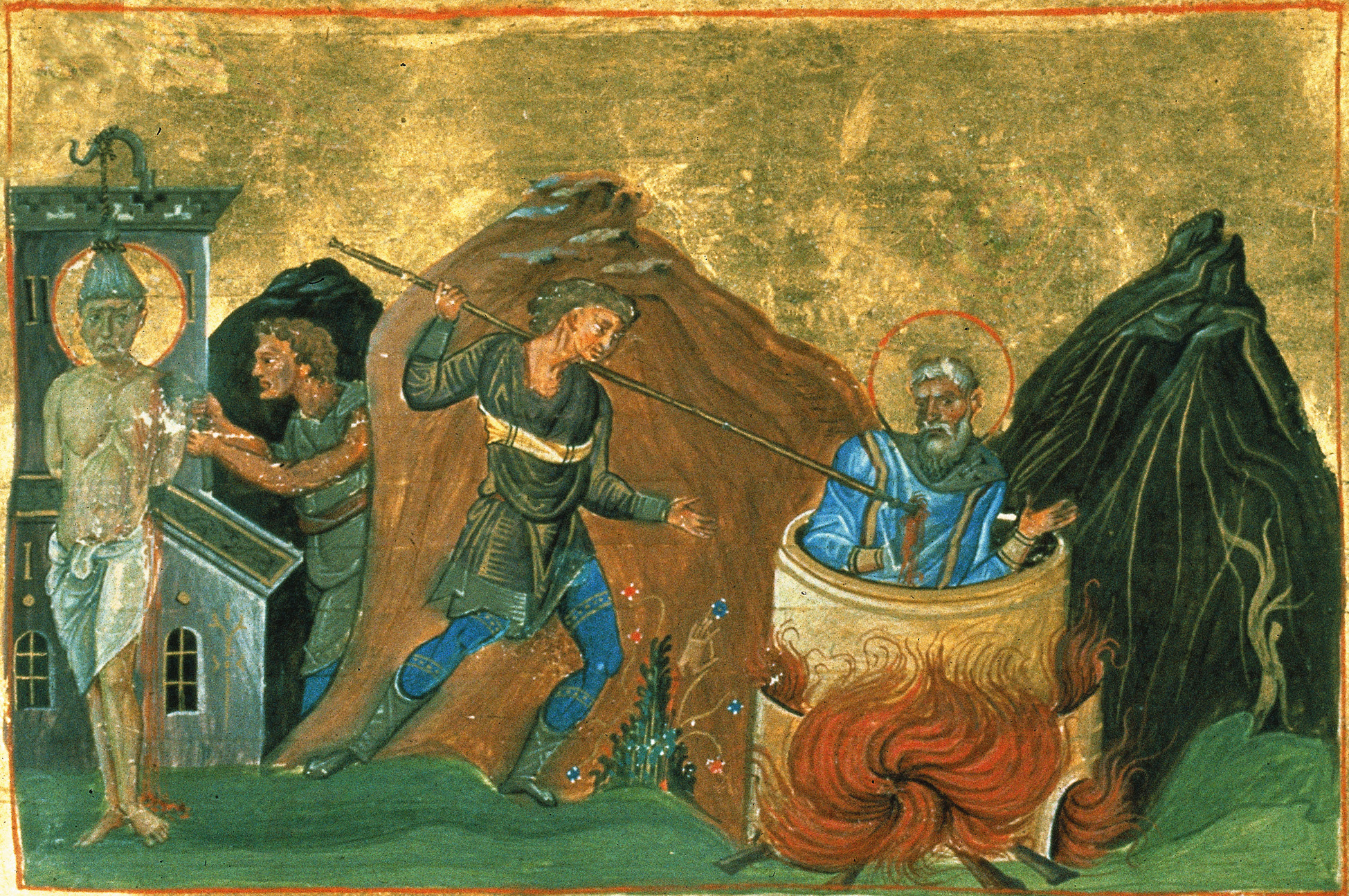
Martyrdom of Cyriacus of Jerusalem and his mother, martyr Anna.
(Menologion of Basil II, 10th century).

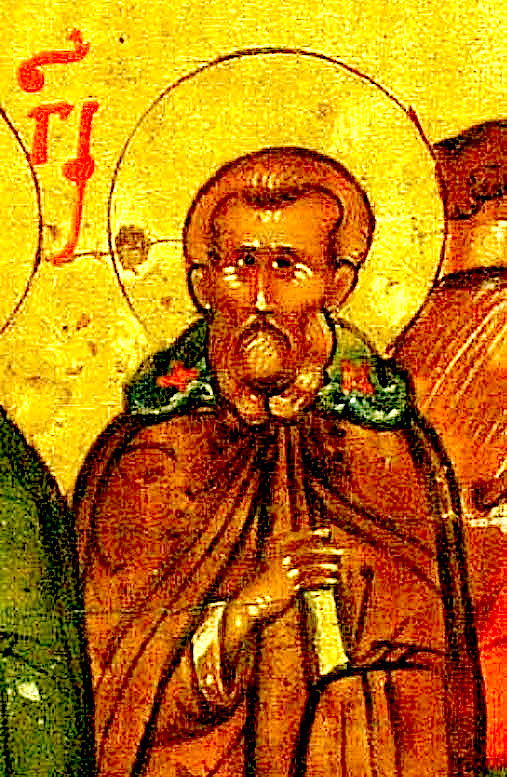
St. Stephen of Mar Sabbas, hymnographer.

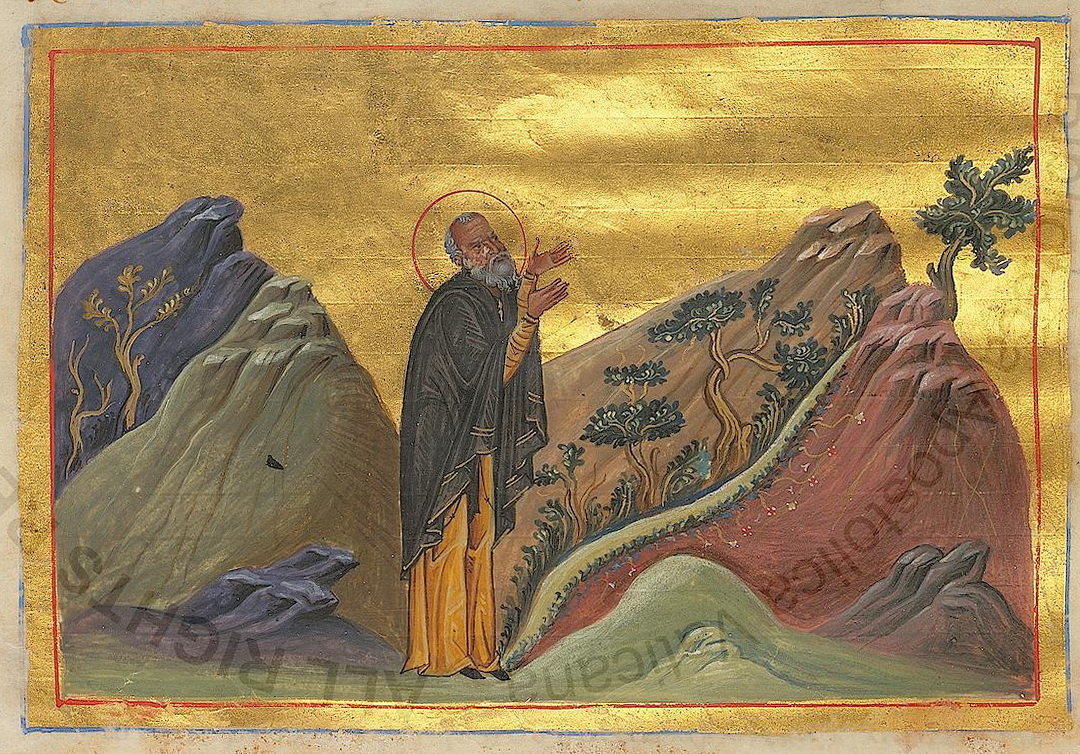
St. John the Chozebite, Bishop of Caesarea in Palestine.
(Menologion of Basil II, 10th century).

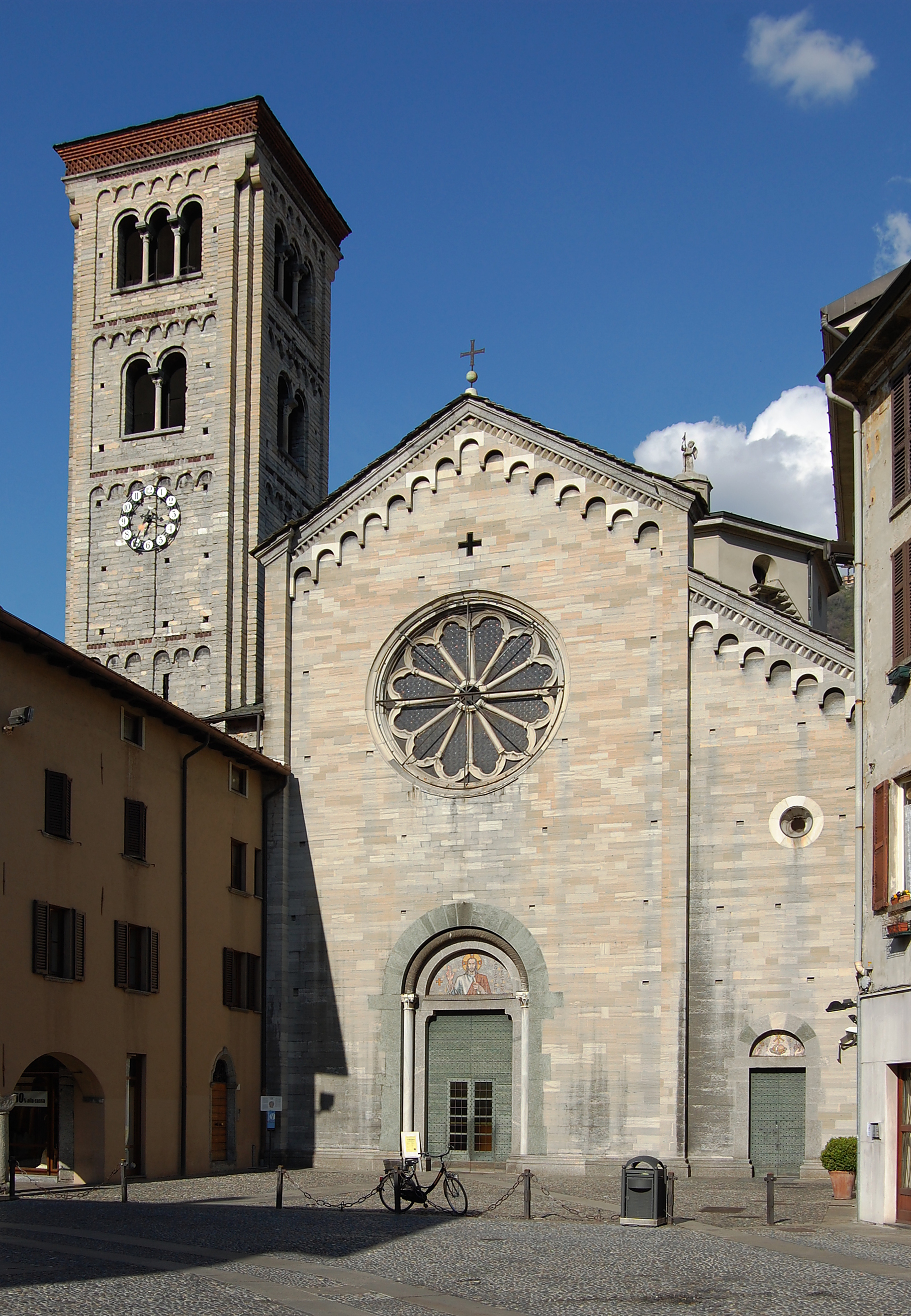
The Basilica of San Fedele in Como.

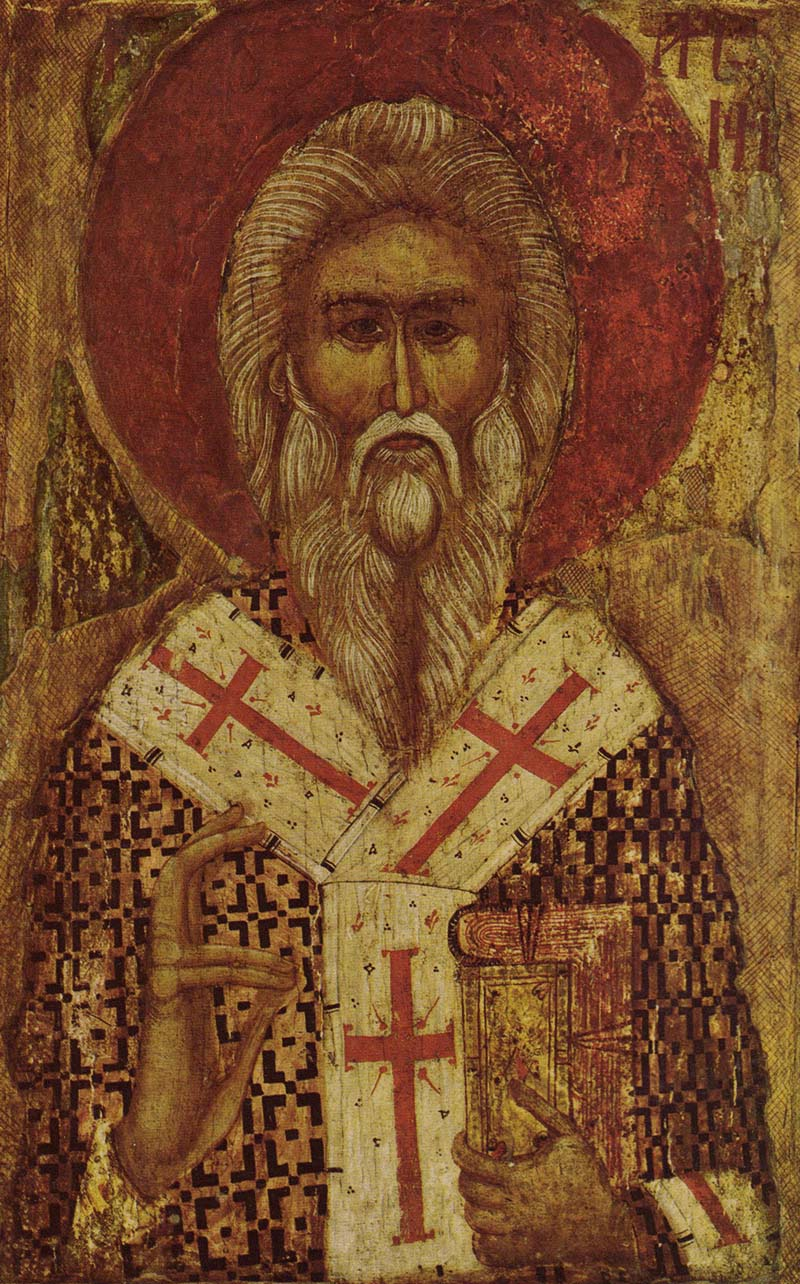
Saint Arsenius of Srem, Archbishop of Serbia.

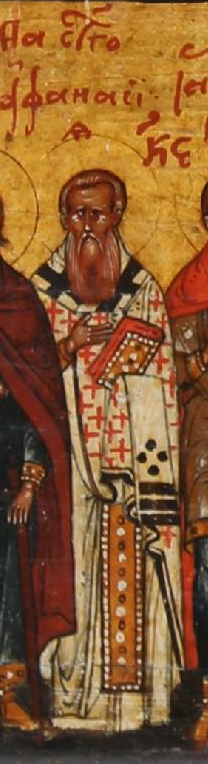
St. Athanasius I, Patriarch of Constantinople.

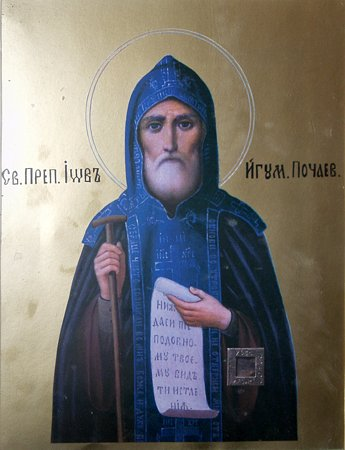
Venerable Job of Pochayiv, Abbot and Wonderworker of Pochaev.

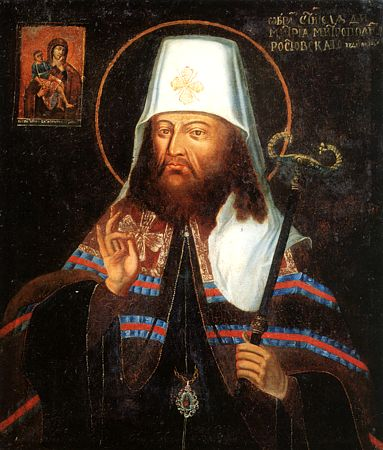
Saint Demetrius of Rostov, Metropolitan of Rostov.

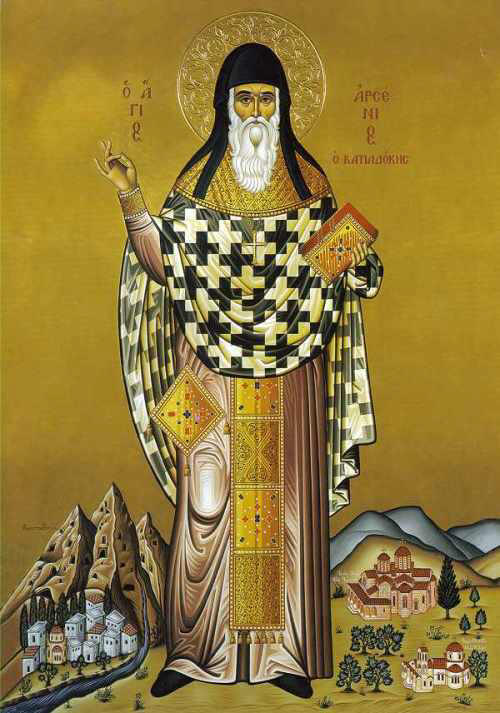
Venerable Arsenius of Cappadocia.

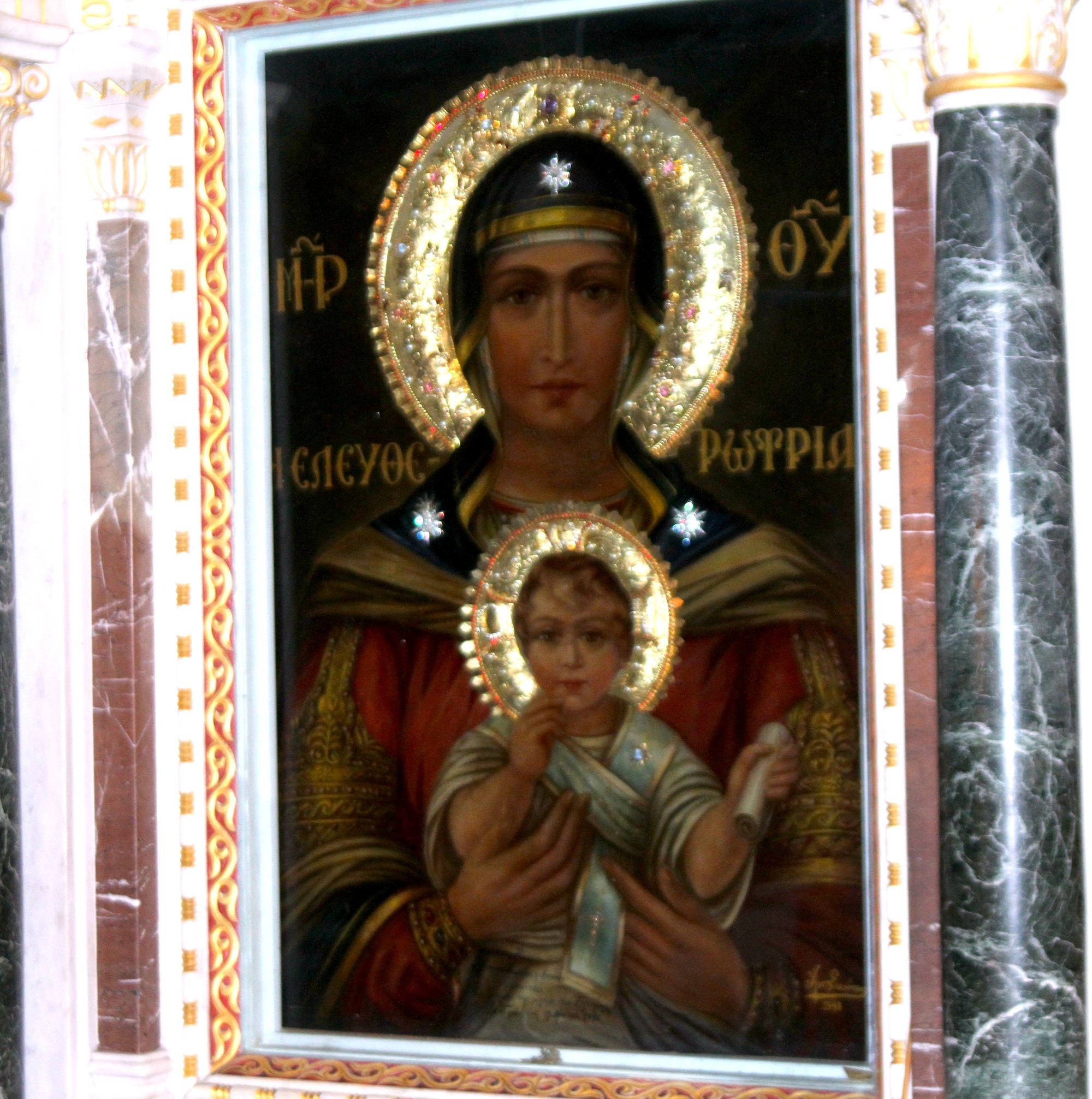
The Most Holy Theotokos the "ELEFTHEROTRIA"
(the Deliverer/Liberator), Athens.

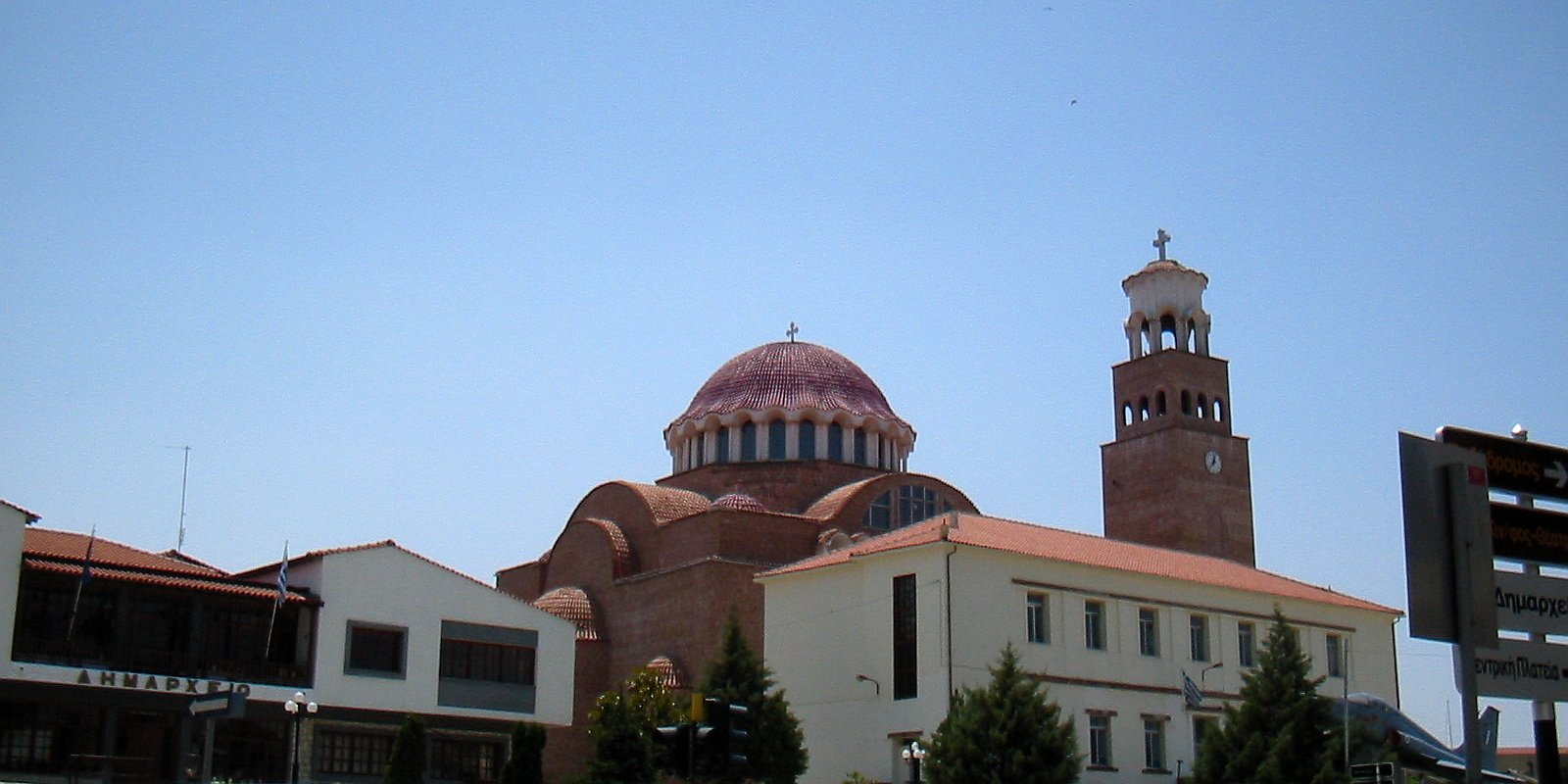
Orthodox Church of Panagia Eleftherotria ("Our Lady of Deliverance"), built 1992–94, Didymoteicho, Evros, Greece.

== Sources ==
- October 28/November 10. Orthodox Calendar (PRAVOSLAVIE.RU).
- November 10 / October 28. HOLY TRINITY RUSSIAN ORTHODOX CHURCH (A parish of the Patriarchate of Moscow).
- October 28. OCA - The Lives of the Saints.
- The Autonomous Orthodox Metropolia of Western Europe and the Americas (ROCOR). St. Hilarion Calendar of Saints for the year of our Lord 2004. St. Hilarion Press (Austin, TX). p. 80.
- October 28. Latin Saints of the Orthodox Patriarchate of Rome.
- The Roman Martyrology. Transl. by the Archbishop of Baltimore. Last Edition, According to the Copy Printed at Rome in 1914. Revised Edition, with the Imprimatur of His Eminence Cardinal Gibbons. Baltimore: John Murphy Company, 1916. p. 332.
- Rev. Richard Stanton. A Menology of England and Wales, or, Brief Memorials of the Ancient British and English Saints Arranged According to the Calendar, Together with the Martyrs of the 16th and 17th Centuries. London: Burns & Oates, 1892. pp. 516–517.

Greek Sources

- Great Synaxaristes: (in Greek) 28 ΟΚΤΩΒΡΙΟΥ. ΜΕΓΑΣ ΣΥΝΑΞΑΡΙΣΤΗΣ.
- (in Greek) Συναξαριστής. 28 Οκτωβρίου. ECCLESIA.GR. (H ΕΚΚΛΗΣΙΑ ΤΗΣ ΕΛΛΑΔΟΣ).

Russian Sources

- (in Russian) 10 ноября (28 октября). Православная Энциклопедия под редакцией Патриарха Московского и всея Руси Кирилла (электронная версия). (Orthodox Encyclopedia - Pravenc.ru).
- (in Russian) 28 октября (ст.ст.) 10 ноября 2013 (нов. ст.). Русская Православная Церковь Отдел внешних церковных связей. (DECR).
