= March 23 (Eastern Orthodox liturgics) =

Day in the Eastern Orthodox liturgical calendar

Eastern Orthodox liturgical calendar
March 22	March 23	March 24
March 23 O.S. ≍ April 5 N.S. March 23 N.S ≍ March 10 O.S.

An Eastern Orthodox cross

March 23 in Eastern Orthodox liturgical calendars is a feast day and a day of commemoration of saints and martyrs. Although some Orthodox churches use the Revised Julian Calendar and others use the traditional Julian calendar, the fixed commemorations for their respective March 23 are broadly the same, no matter which calendar is used. (Note: Despite the dates being the same, the days to which they refer typically differ by 13 days. The notation Old Style or O.S. is sometimes used to indicate a date in the traditional Julian Calendar (the "Old Calendar"). The notation New Style or N.S. indicates a date in the Revised Julian calendar (the "New Calendar").)

== Saints ==
- Martyrs Philetas the Senator, his wife Lydia, their sons Macedon and Theoprepius (Bogolep), the notary Cronides, and Amphilochius the Captain, in Illyria (125) (see also: March 27)
- Monk-martyr Nikon and 199 disciples, in Sicily (251)
- Martyr Dometius in Phrygia (360-361) (see also: October 30)

== Pre-Schism Western saints ==
- Saint Victorian, Frumentius, other Frumentius and Companions (484) (Note: "IN Africa, the holy martyrs Victorian, proconsul of Carthage, and two brothers, of Aquaregia. Also two merchants, named Frementius, who, bishop Victor Africanus tells us, were subjected to most atrocious torments for their courageous confession of the Catholic faith, and gloriously crowned under the Arian king Hunneric, during the persecution of the Vandals.")
- Saint Gwinear (Guigner) of Cornwall, born Fingar (5th century)
- Saint Felix and Companions, a group of twenty-one martyrs in North Africa (5th century)
- Saint Fidelis, a martyr in North Africa.
- Saint Maidoc (Mo-Mhaedog), Abbot of Fiddown in Kilkenny in Ireland (5th century)
- Saint Benedict of Campania (Benedict the Hermit), hermit in the Campagna in Italy, miraculously delivered from death by burning at the hands of Totila the Goth (550) (Note: "In Campania, St. Benedict, a monk, who was shut up by the Goths in a burning furnace, but was the next day found uninjured.")
- Saint Æthelwold, a monk at Ripon in England, he lived as a hermit on Inner Farne for twelve years (699)
- Saint Felix of Montecassino (ca. 1000) (Note: On account of the many miracles at his tomb the Bishop of Chieti enshrined his relics for veneration.)

== Post-Schism Orthodox saints ==
- Venerable Nicon the Great, abbot of the Kiev Caves (1088)
- Venerable Ephraim of the Kiev Caves (13th century)
- Venerable Pachomius, Abbot of Nerekhta (1384)
- Saint Bassian, Archbishop of Rostov (1481)
- Venerable Theodosius the Wonderworker, Abbot of the Monastery of the Saviour in Totma, Russia (1568) (see also: January 28)
- Righteous Basil of Mangazea in Siberia, Wonderworker (1602) (see also: March 22; and June 6, May 10 - Translation of Relics)
- New Monk-martyr Luke the New of Adrianople and Mt. Athos, at Mytilene (1802)
- New Martyr Panagiotis at Jerusalem (1820) (Note: "Now I will relate a remarkable instance of modern Martyrdom. A young Greek, some years ago, whose name was Panaiotes, was servant to a Turkish Nobleman, called Osman Effendi. He came with his master to Jerusalem, and when Osman Effendi went to worship in the Mosque of Omar, this young Greek accompanied him. Soon after Osman Effendi undertook a journey to Damascus, intending to return to Jerusalem, and left Panaiotes to await his return. When the Pasha of Damascus arrived here, on his annual visit, Panaiotes was accused to him of having profaned the Mosque of Omar, by having entered it; he was summoned to appear before the Pasha, and questioned as to why he did so; he answered that he had followed his master, whom it was his duty to follow. The penalty was death or to turn Muhammedan, which was much pressed upon him. Panaiotes exclaimed, "Christ is risen, who is the Son of the living God. I fear nothing." Pasha — "Say God is God, and Muhammed the Prophet of God, and I adopt you as my son." Panaiotes — "Christ is risen, I fear nothing." They led him out before the Castle of David, and drew up the soldiers around him with their swords drawn; but Panaiotes exclaimed, "I am a Christian! Christ is risen! I fear nothing!" He knelt down and prayed to Jesus Christ the Son of God, and exclaimed, "Christ is risen! I fear nothing." Even Christians advised him to turn Muhammedan. He exclaimed, "Christ is risen! I fear nothing." The executioner lifted up his fine hair which he wore, as many Greeks do, flowing down to the shoulders, and struck him several times with the sword so as to draw blood, in the hope that he might relent, but Panaiotes continued, "Jesus is the Son of the living God"; and crossing himself he exclaimed, "Christ is risen, I fear nothing," and his head fell. The Greek Convent paid 5000 piastres for leave to remove his body and bury him.") (see also: April 5)
- Saint Elena (Bekhteeva), Nun of the Florovsk Ascension Convent in Kiev (1834) (Note: St Elena was a friend of the great Ukrainian St Tikhon of Zadonsk. When the latter insisted on being buried in a humble wooden coffin, the monks found they could not fit his body into it with all his Episcopal robes, and so they buried him in another, larger coffin. St Helen asked for and received St Tikhon’s first coffin in which she herself was buried.)

=== New martyrs and confessors ===
- New Hieromartyr Constantine Petrovich Snyatinovsky (1918)
- New Hieromartyr Macarius Feodorovich Kvitkin, Protopriest of Orenburg (1931) (Note: See: (in Russian) Квиткин, Макарий Фёдорович. Википедии. Russian Wikipedia.)
- New Hieromartyr Elias (Vyatlin), hieromonk of the Lukianov Monastery of the Nativity of the Theotokos, Vladimir (1938) (Note: (in Russian): Илия (Вятлин).)
- New Hieromartyrs Basil Koklin, (Note: See: (in Russian) Коклин, Василий Павлович. Википедии. Russian Wikipedia.) and Stephen Preobrazhensky, Priests (1938) (Note: (in Russian): сщмч. Стефана Преображенского пресвитера (после 1937); сщмч. Василия Коклина пресвитера, прмч.)
- New Martyr James (1938)
- Virgin-martyr Anastasia Stefanovna Bobkova, novice (1938) (Note: (in Russian): Анастасии Бобковой и Варвары Конкиной, мч.)
- Virgin-martyr BarBara (Konkina), nun (1938)
- Martyr Alexis Simeonovich Skorobogatov (1938)
- New Hiero-Confessor Venerable Sergius (Srebriansky), Archimandrite, of Tver (1948) (Note: See: (in Russian) Сергий (Сребрянский). Википедии. Russian Wikipedia.)

== Other commemorations ==
- Icon of Our Lady of Antioch (580)
- Repose of Saint Helena Dragaš in monasticism Hypomone (1450)
- Repose of Elder Porphyrius of Glinsk Hermitage (1868)
- Commemoration of execution of Vladimir Petrovich Gorizontov of Orenburg (1931)

== Icon gallery ==
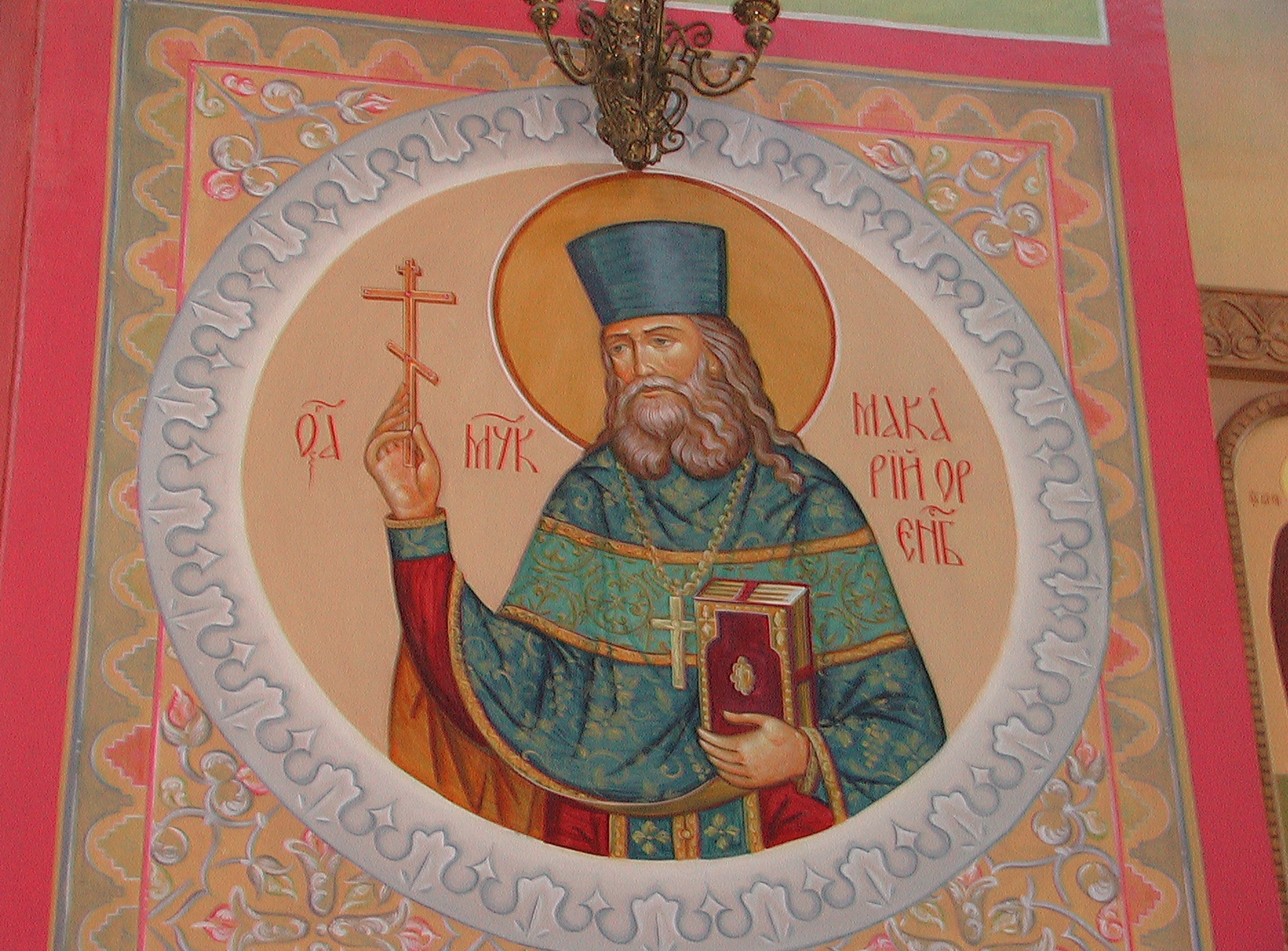
New Hieromartyr Macarius (Kvitkin), Protopresbyter of Orenburg (1931).

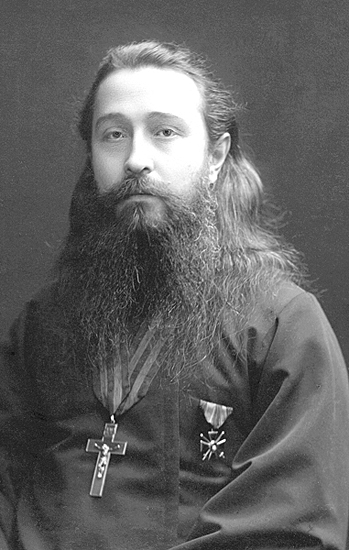
New Hiero-Confessor Venerable Sergius (Srebriansky), Archimandrite, of Tver (1948).

== Sources ==
- March 23/April 5. Orthodox Calendar (PRAVOSLAVIE.RU).
- April 5 / March 23. HOLY TRINITY RUSSIAN ORTHODOX CHURCH (A parish of the Patriarchate of Moscow).
- March 23. OCA - The Lives of the Saints.
- The Autonomous Orthodox Metropolia of Western Europe and the Americas (ROCOR). St. Hilarion Calendar of Saints for the year of our Lord 2004. St. Hilarion Press (Austin, TX). p. 23.
- March 23. Latin Saints of the Orthodox Patriarchate of Rome.
- The Roman Martyrology. Transl. by the Archbishop of Baltimore. Last Edition, According to the Copy Printed at Rome in 1914. Revised Edition, with the Imprimatur of His Eminence Cardinal Gibbons. Baltimore: John Murphy Company, 1916. pp. 84–85.
- Rev. Richard Stanton. A Menology of England and Wales, or, Brief Memorials of the Ancient British and English Saints Arranged According to the Calendar, Together with the Martyrs of the 16th and 17th Centuries. London: Burns & Oates, 1892. pp. 130–131.

Greek Sources

- Great Synaxaristes: (in Greek) 23 ΜΑΡΤΙΟΥ. ΜΕΓΑΣ ΣΥΝΑΞΑΡΙΣΤΗΣ.
- (in Greek) Συναξαριστής. 23 Μαρτίου. ECCLESIA.GR. (H ΕΚΚΛΗΣΙΑ ΤΗΣ ΕΛΛΑΔΟΣ).

Russian Sources

- (in Russian) 5 апреля (23 марта). Православная Энциклопедия под редакцией Патриарха Московского и всея Руси Кирилла (электронная версия). (Orthodox Encyclopedia - Pravenc.ru).
- (in Russian) 23 марта (ст.ст.) 5 апреля 2013 (нов. ст.). Русская Православная Церковь Отдел внешних церковных связей. (DECR).
