= April 4 (Eastern Orthodox liturgics) =

Day in the Eastern Orthodox liturgical calendar

Eastern Orthodox liturgical calendar
| April 3 | April 4 | April 5 |
April 4 O.S. ≍ April 17 N.S. April 4 N.S ≍ March 22 O.S.

An Eastern Orthodox cross

April 4 in Eastern Orthodox liturgical calendars is a feast day and a day of commemoration of saints and martyrs. Although some Orthodox churches use the Revised Julian Calendar and others use the traditional Julian calendar, the fixed commemorations for their respective April 4 are broadly the same, no matter which calendar is used. (Note: Despite the dates being the same, the days to which they refer typically differ by 13 days. The notation Old Style or O.S. is sometimes used to indicate a date in the traditional Julian Calendar (the "Old Calendar"). The notation New Style or N.S. indicates a date in the Revised Julian calendar (the "New Calendar").)

== Saints ==
- Martyrs Agathopodes, a deacon, and Theodulus, a lector, at Thessalonica, under Maximian (c. 286–305) (Note: "At Thessalonica, in the time of the emperor Maximian and the governor Faustinus, the holy martyrs Agathopodes, a deacon, and Theodulus, a lector, who, for the confession of the Christian faith, were thrown into the sea with stones tied to their necks.") (see also: April 5 - Slavic)
- Virgin-martyr Pherbutha (Tarbula, Phermoutha, Ferfouthe) of Persia, with her sister Mekadoshta and the latter’s maidservant (343)
- Venerable George of Mount Maleon (Malevon) in Laconia, monk, in the Peloponnese (5th-6th centuries)
- Venerable Publius the Egyptian. (see also: April 5 - Slavic)
- Venerable Zosimas of Palestine, Hieromonk (c. 560) (Note: "In Palestine, the anchoret St. Zozimus, who buried the remains of St. Mary of Egypt.")
- Venerable Saints Theonas, Symeon, and Fervinus (Phorbinus). (see also: April 5 - Slavic)
- Venerable Platon the Studite (Plato of Sakkoudion), Abbot of the Studion and Confessor (812) (Note: "At Constantinople, St. Plato, a monk, who for many years combated with invincible courage the heretics that were breaking sacred images.") (see also: April 5 - Slavic)
- Venerable Joseph the Hymnographer, of Sicily (883) (see also: April 3)

== Pre-Schism Western saints ==
- Saint Guier, a priest and hermit in Cornwall, where a church recalls his name.
- Saint Gwerir, a hermit near Liskeard in Cornwall, at whose grave King Alfred was healed of a serious illness. (Note: St Gwerir's cell was later occupied by Neot.)
- Saint Tigernach of Clones (Tigernake, Tierney, Tierry), Abbot of Clones, succeeded St Macartin as bishop at Clogher in Ireland (549) (Note: "St. Tigernake - Confessor, Bishop of Clogher aud Clones. This Saint was a native of Ireland, who came to Great Britain for his religious education, and is said to have been a disciple of Monennius. On his return to his country he was made Bishop of Clogher, to which he united the district of Clones.")
- Saint Isidore of Seville, Bishop of Seville (636) (Note: Born in Cartagena in Spain, he was the brother of Sts Leander, Fulgentius and Florentina. He succeeded St Leander as Bishop of Seville in 600. He presided over several Councils, reorganised the Spanish Church, encouraged monastic life, completed the Mozarabic rite, was an encyclopedic writer and was also responsible for the Council of Toledo in 633.)
- Saint Hildebert of Ghent, Abbot of Saint Peter's Abbey, Ghent, Belgium, martyred by fanatics for defending the veneration of icons (752)

== Post-Schism Orthodox saints ==
- Venerable Joseph the Much-ailing, of the Kiev Caves (14th century)
- Venerable James, monk of Starotorzhok (Old Torzhok) in Galich, Kostroma (15th-16th centuries)
- Venerable Theonas, Metropolitan of Thessaloniki (1541)
- Venerable Zosimas, founder and abbot of the Annunciation Monastery at Lake Vorbozoma (Vorbosomsk) (1550)
- New Hieromartyr Nicetas the Albanian, of Mount Athos and Serres (1808)
- Venerable Elias of Makeyevka, Schema-monk, of Makeyevka, Ukraine (1949) (Note: The canonization of the Great-Schema Monk Elias (born Ilya Yakovlevich Ganja / Ilya Hanzha) took place in Makeevka, Ukraine on September 22, 2012.)

=== New martyrs and confessors ===
- New Hieromartyr Benjamin (Kononov), Archimandrite, of Solovki Monastery (1928) (Note: See: (in Russian) Вениамин (Кононов). Википедии. (Russian Wikipedia).)
- New Hieromartyr Nicephorus (Kuchin), Hieromonk, of Solovki Monastery (1928)
- New Hieromartyr Nicholas (Karaulov), Bishop of Velsk (1932)
- New Nun-martyr Maria (Lelyanova) of Gatchina (1932) (Note: "Maria Gatchinskaya (born Lidia Alexandrovna Lelyanova) (1874, St. Petersburg -1932, Leningrad), schema nun. A daughter of a wealthy St. Petersburg merchant, she studied at a gymnasium. From 1909 she lived in Gatchina, at 41 Baggovutskaya Street (the house has not survived). She had rheumatism from an early age, and was bed-ridden from 1912. However, she found a gift for consoling mourners. In the 1920s, she took the veil under the name of Maria and received numerous visitors who sought spiritual comfort from her. Maria Gatchinskaya, whose confessor was archpriest Ioann Smolin, soon had a circle of young female admirers gathered around her. In February 1932, Maria Gatchinskaya was arrested and put into a prison hospital. According to one of the versions concerning her death she died shortly after imprisonment following doctors' experiments. She was buried at Smolenskoe Orthodox Cemetery near the Chapel of Xenia the Blessed; the faithful consider her a martyr.") (Note: See: (in Russian) Мария Гатчинская. Википедии. (Russian Wikipedia).) (see also: January 26)
- New Hieromartyr John Vechorko, Priest (1933)
- Martyr John Kolesnikov (1943)

== Other commemorations ==
- Icon of the Most Holy Theotokos "The Life-giving Spring" (450) (see also: Bright Friday)
- The Akathist Hymn (Chairetismoi) to the Virgin Mary (626)
- Icon of the Most Holy Theotokos "Gerontissa" ("Eldress"), at Pantokratoros monastery, Mount Athos. (see also: December 2)
- The Icon of the Mother of God "Deliverer" ("Deliveress") (1841, 1889) (Note: Note, there is another icon of the Theotokos "the Deliverer" ("Eleftherotria"), which is commemorated on October 28 in Greece, at the Shrine of Panagia Eleftherotria ("Our Lady of Deliverance"), Athens.) (see also: October 17)
- Repose of Elder Savvas of Little St. Anne's Skete, Mt. Athos (1908)
- Repose of Archimandrite John (Maitland Moir) of Edinburgh, Scotland (April 17, 2013) (Note: "In 1981 he went to the Holy Mountain where he was received into the Orthodox Church at the Monastery of Simonos Petra. Then he came to Britain where he was ordained Deacon (12/07/81) and Priest (13/07/81) within the Archdiocese of Thyateira and Great Britain. His first parish was Coventry. He came to Edinburgh in 1984 where there was a small Orthodox community consisting of Slavs and Greeks which was served by Archpriest John Sotnikov (and occasionally by the Greek priest from Glasgow) and was under the Ecumenical Patriarchate. Fr John Maitland Moir united the Orthodox of the city in one community that of St Andrew the First-Called under the Archdiocese of Thyateira and the Ecumenical Patriarchate.")

== Icon gallery ==
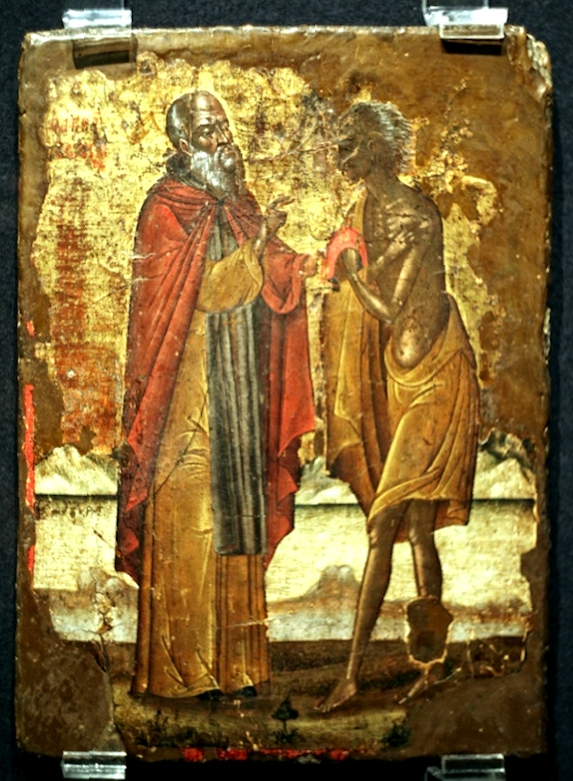
Venerable Zosimas of Palestine, with St. Mary of Egypt (Greece, 17th century).

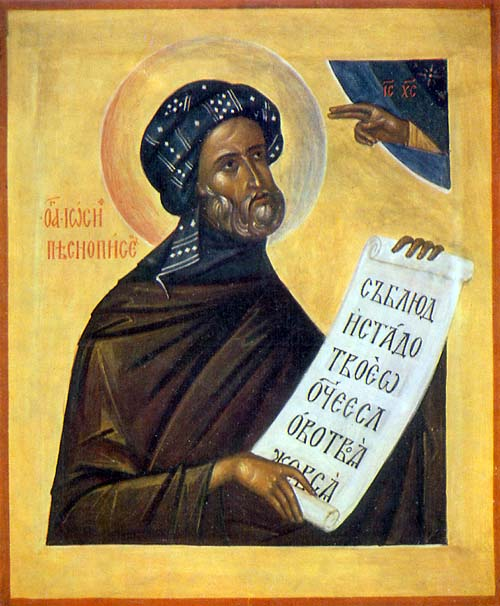
Venerable Joseph the Hymnographer, of Sicily.

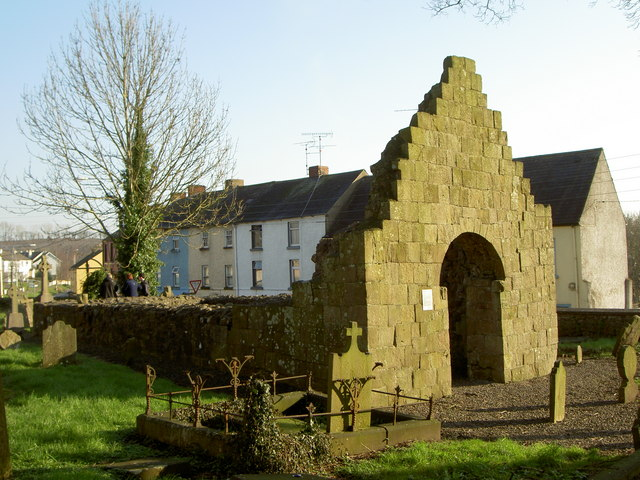
Abbey of St. Peter & Paul, Clones (Clones Abbey).

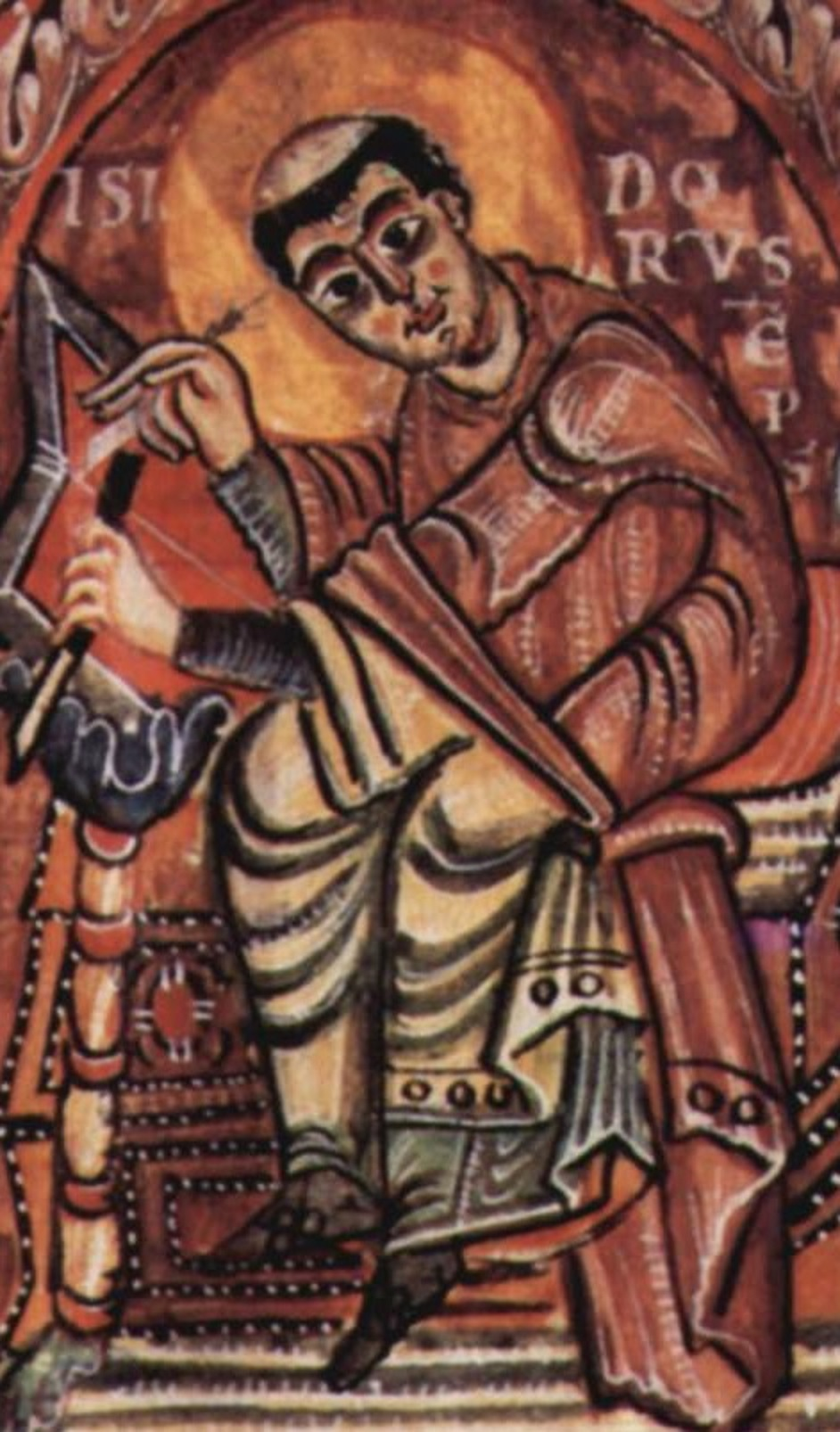
St. Isidore of Seville, Bishop of Seville.

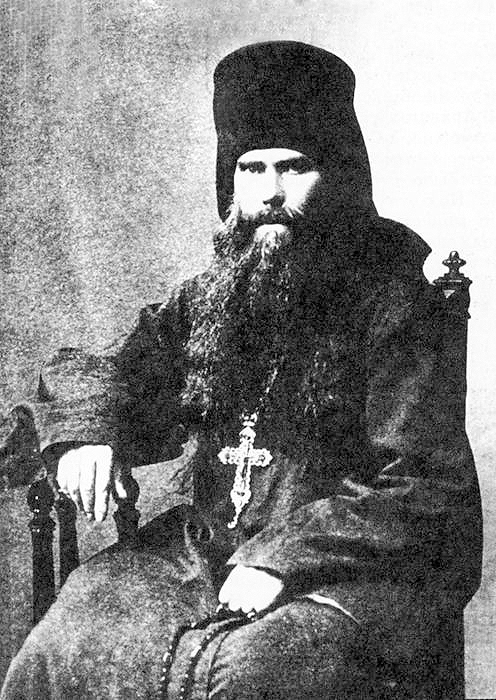
New Hieromartyr Benjamin (Kononov), Archimandrite, of Solovki Monastery.

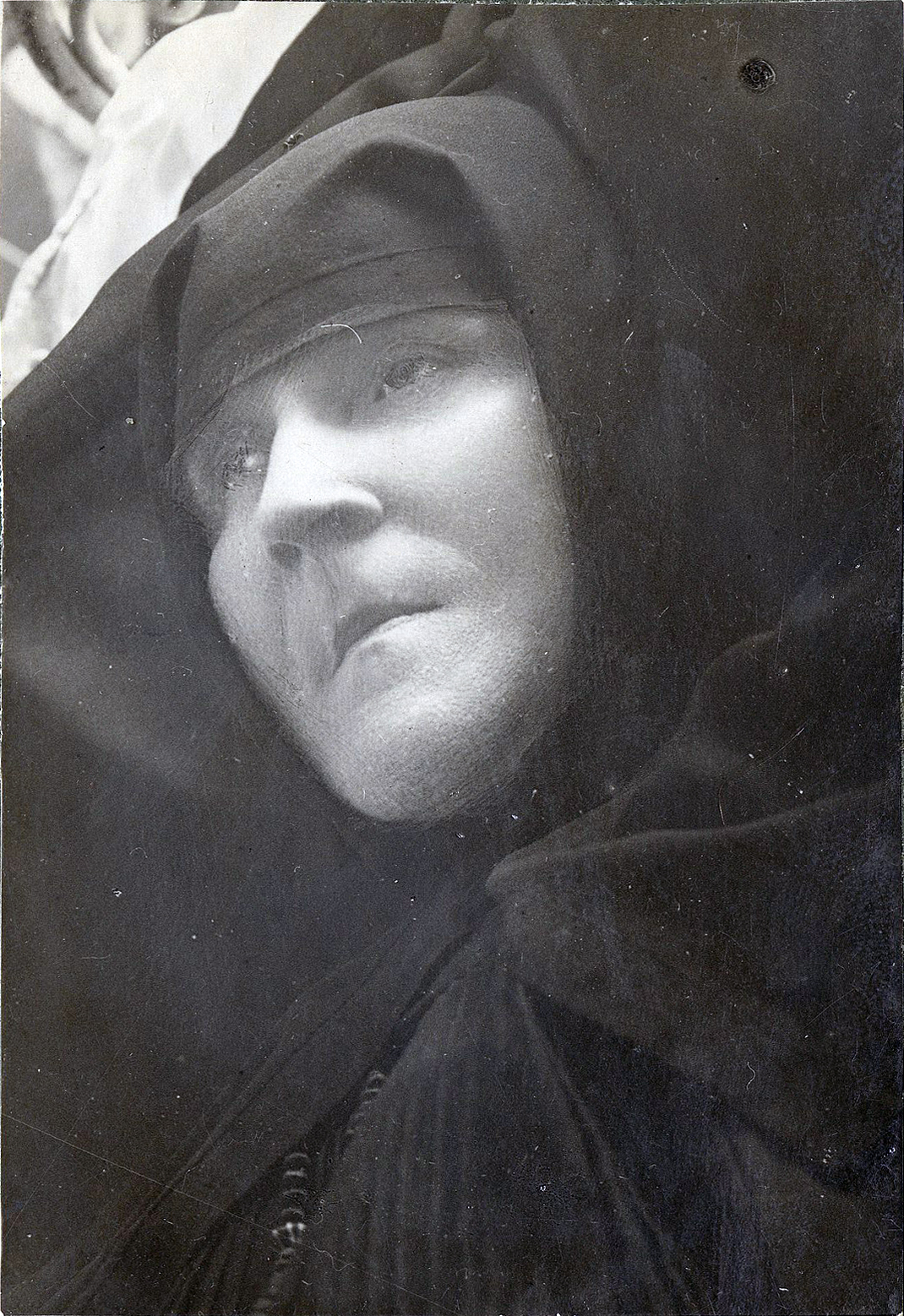
New Nun-martyr Maria (Lelyanova) of Gatchina.

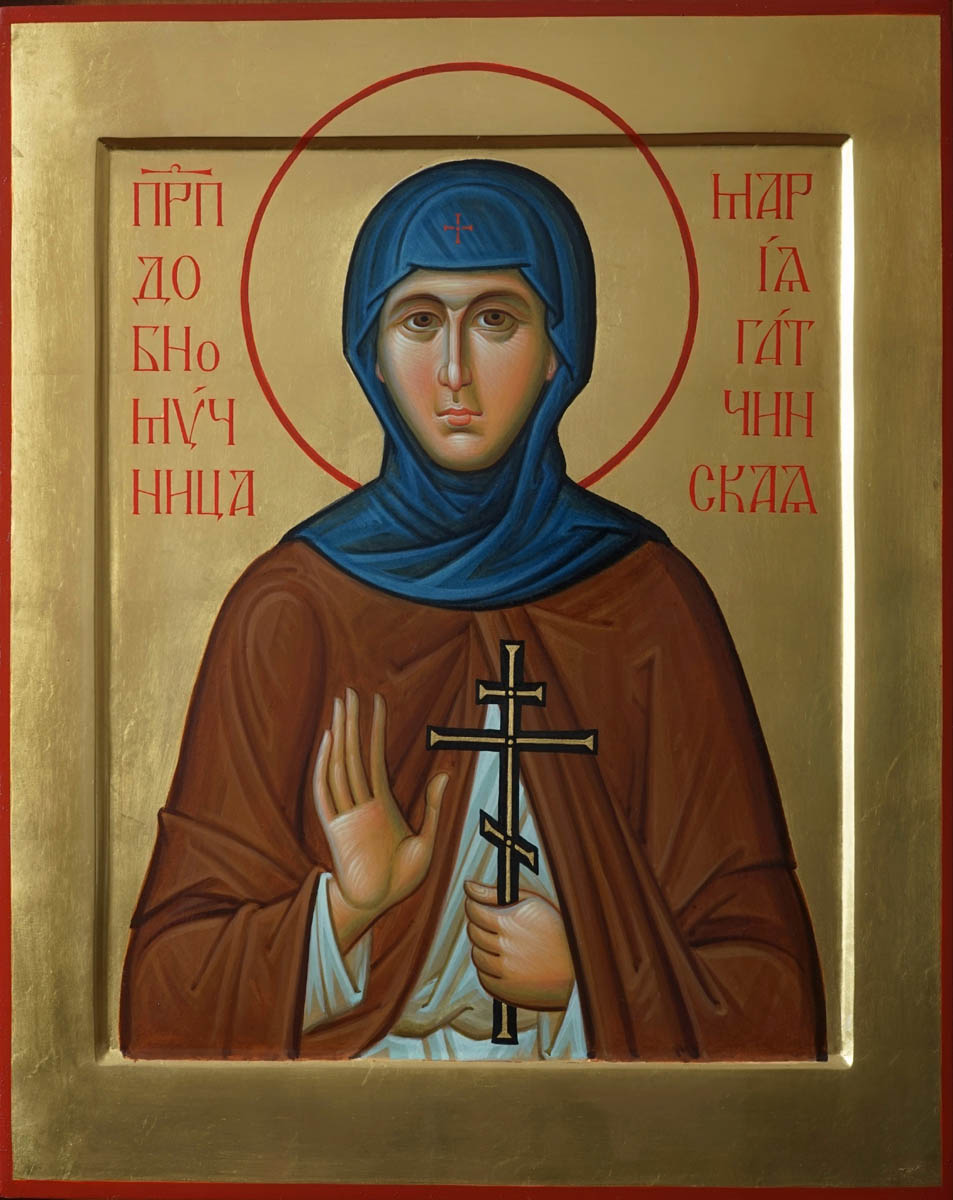
New Nun-martyr Maria (Lelyanova) of Gatchina.

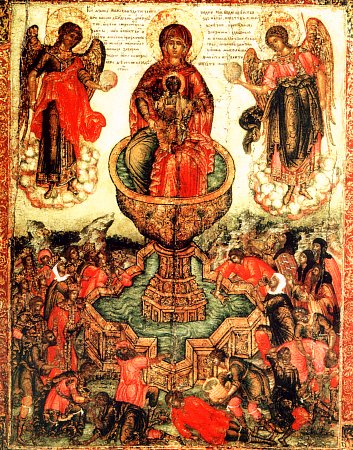
Russian icon of the Theotokos, Life-giving Spring, 17th century.

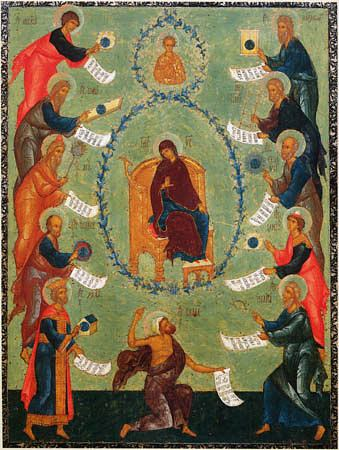
Detail of the icon of the Praises of the Theotokos, before which the Akathist may be chanted.

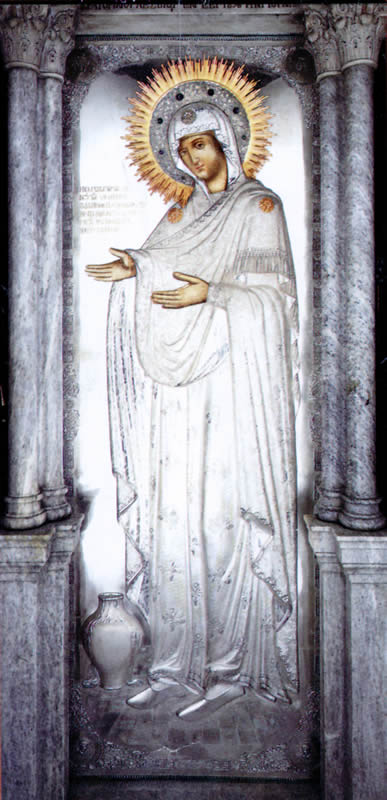
Icon of the Most Holy Theotokos "Gerontissa" ("Eldress").

== Sources ==
- April 4 / April 17. Orthodox Calendar (pravoslavie.ru).
- April 17 / April 4. Holy Trinity Russian Orthodox Church (A parish of the Patriarchate of Moscow).
- April 4. OCA - The Lives of the Saints.
- The Autonomous Orthodox Metropolia of Western Europe and the Americas. St. Hilarion Calendar of Saints for the year of our Lord 2004. St. Hilarion Press (Austin, TX). p. 26.
- April 4. Latin Saints of the Orthodox Patriarchate of Rome.
- The Roman Martyrology. Transl. by the Archbishop of Baltimore. Last Edition, According to the Copy Printed at Rome in 1914. Revised Edition, with the Imprimatur of His Eminence Cardinal Gibbons. Baltimore: John Murphy Company, 1916. p. 96.
- Rev. Richard Stanton. A Menology of England and Wales, or, Brief Memorials of the Ancient British and English Saints Arranged According to the Calendar, Together with the Martyrs of the 16th and 17th Centuries. London: Burns & Oates, 1892. p. 144.

Greek Sources

- Great Synaxaristes: (in Greek) 4 Απριλίου. Μεγασ Συναξαριστησ.
- (in Greek) Συναξαριστής. 4 Απριλίου. ecclesia.gr. (H Εκκλησια Τησ Ελλαδοσ).

Russian Sources

- (in Russian) 17 апреля (4 апреля). Православная Энциклопедия под редакцией Патриарха Московского и всея Руси Кирилла (электронная версия). (Orthodox Encyclopedia - Pravenc.ru).
- (in Russian) 4 апреля (ст.ст.) 17 апреля 2013 (нов. ст.). Русская Православная Церковь Отдел внешних церковных связей.
