= June 3 (Eastern Orthodox liturgics) =

Day in the Eastern Orthodox liturgical calendar

Eastern Orthodox liturgical calendar
June 2	June 3	June 4
June 3 O.S. ≍ June 16 N.S. June 3 N.S ≍ May 21 O.S.

An Eastern Orthodox cross

June 3 in Eastern Orthodox liturgical calendars is a feast day and a day of commemoration of saints and martyrs. Although some Orthodox churches use the Revised Julian Calendar and others use the traditional Julian calendar, the fixed commemorations for their respective June 3 are broadly the same, no matter which calendar is used. (Note: Despite the dates being the same, the days to which they refer typically differ by 13 days. The notation Old Style or O.S. is sometimes used to indicate a date in the traditional Julian Calendar (the "Old Calendar"). The notation New Style or N.S. indicates a date in the Revised Julian calendar (the "New Calendar").)

== Saints ==
- Hieromartyrs Lucian the bishop, Maxianus the presbyter, Julian the deacon, and Martyrs Marcellinus and Saturninus, at Beauvais in Gaul (c. 81-96)
- Martyrs Lucillian and those with him, at Byzantium (c. 270-275): (Note: "At Constantinople, the holy martyrs Lucillian and four boys, Claudius, Hypatius, Paul, and Denis. Lucillian, formerly a pagan priest, but now a Christian, was cast into a furnace with them, after undergoing many torments; but the flames being extinguished by the rain, all escaped uninjured. Finally, under the governor Silvanus, they terminated their career; Lucillian, by crucifixion, the children, by decapitation.") (Note: In 1979, Saint Lucillian appeared to St. Paisios of Mount Athos, together with Saint Panteleimon.)

- Four youths — Claudius, Hypatius, Paul, and Dionysius — and the virgin Paula (Note: "In the same city, St. Paula, virgin and martyr, who was arrested whilst gathering the blood of the martyrs just mentioned, beaten with rods, and thrown into the fire, from which she was delivered. Finally, when St. Lucillian had been crucified, she was decapitated.")

- Saint Achillas, Bishop of Alexandria (312)
- Saint Hieria, widow, of Mesopotamia (312)
- Monk-martyr Barsabas, Abbot, of Ishtar, and ten companions, in Persia (342)
- Venerable Pappos, Bishop of Chytri (Kythrea), Cyprus (368) (Note: See: (in Greek) Επισκοπή Χύτρων. Βικιπαίδεια. (Greek Wikipedia). - Diocese of Chytri.)
- Venerable Athanasius the Wonderworker, hieromonk of Traiannou Monastery in Bithynia (c. 933)

== Pre-Schism Western saints ==
- Saint Cominus, a companion of Saint Pothinus and martyr in Lyon, France (2nd century)
- Saints Pergentinus and Laurentinus, two brothers martyred in Arezzo in Italy under Decius (251) (Note: "AT Arezzo, in Tuscany, during the persecution of Decius, under the governor Tiburtius, the holy martyrs Pergentinus and Laurentinus, brothers, who, while yet children, were put to the sword, after they had endured cruel torments and performed many miracles.")
- Saint Caecilius (Caecilian), a priest in Carthage in North Africa who converted Saint Cyprian to Christ (3rd century) (Note: St. Cyprian never ceased to revere his name, adding it to his own, and on Caecilius's repose, he looked after his wife and children.)
- Saint Oliva of Anagni, a nun at Anagni near Rome (492) (Note: See: (in Italian) Oliva di Anagni. Wikipedia. (Italian Wikipedia).)
- Saint Hilary (Hilaire), Bishop of Carcassonne in France (5th century)
- Saint Clotilde (Chlotilda), Queen of France, who completed the basilica of St. Genevieve at Paris (545) (Note: Born in Lyon in France and daughter of the King of Burgundy, she married Clovis, King of the Franks, and led her husband to Orthodox Christianity. She suffered much because of the quarrels of her three sons.) (Note: "At Paris, St. Clotilde, queen, by whose prayers her husband, king Clovis, was converted to the faith of Christ.")
- Venerable Liphardus (Lifard), a prominent lawyer in Orleans in France, who at the age of fifty founded the monastery of Meung-sur-Loire, Confessor (c. 550)
- Venerable Urbicius, fellow ascetic of Saint Liphardus, became abbot of the monastery of Meung-sur-Loire (6th century)
- Venerable Cronan, a disciple of Saint Kevin in Ireland (617)
- Saint Kevin (Coemgen, Caoimhghin), hermit and abbot of Glendalough, Ireland (618) (Note: Born in Leinster, he was a disciple of St. Petroc who then lived in Ireland. He is remembered as the founder of Glendalough, one of the most famous names in Irish history. St. Kevin is one of the patron saints of Dublin.)
- Saint Genesius of Clermont, Bishop of Clermont in Auvergne in France (662) (Note: He is described as learned, benevolent, surpassingly good, loved by old and young, rich and poor.)
- Saint Glunshallaich, a repentant man in Ireland, converted by Saint Kevin and buried with him at Glendalough (7th century)
- Monk-martyr Isaac of Córdoba (851) (Note: Born in Cordoba in Spain, he became proficient in Arabic and a notary under the Moorish government. He resigned in order to become a monk at Tabanos, a few miles from Cordoba. During a public debate in Cordoba he denounced Mohammed and was martyred.)
- Saint Gausmarus, Abbot of Saint Martin of Savigny in France from 954-984 (984)
- Saint Davinus, pilgrim, confessor (1051) (Note: Born in Annenia, he went on a pilgrimage to Rome and Compostella. On his way he stopped in Lucca, where he reposed and was venerated as a saint.)

== Post-Schism Orthodox saints ==
- New Hieromartyr Joseph III Antonopoulos, Metropolitan of Thessalonica (1821) (Note: See: (in Greek) Ιωσήφ Αντωνόπουλος. Βικιπαίδεια. (Greek Wikipedia).)
- New Hieromartyr Gregory of Derkon, Metropolitan of Derkon, near the Istanbul suburb of Saint Stephen (1821) (Note: See: (in Greek) Γρηγόριος ο Δέρκων. Βικιπαίδεια. (Greek Wikipedia).)
- New Hieromartyr Dorotheos of Adrianople, Metropolitan of Adrianople (1821) (Note: See also: (in Greek) Δωρόθεος Πρώιος. Βικιπαίδεια. (Greek Wikipedia).)

=== New martyrs and confessors ===
- New Hieromartyr Cyprian (Nelidov), Hieromonk, of Moscow (1934)
- New Hieromartyr Michael Markov, Priest (1938) (Note: See: (in Russian) Марков, Михаил Михайлович. Википе́дия. (Russian Wikipedia).)

== Other commemorations ==
- Translation of the relics (1606) of the martyred Crown Prince Demetrius (1591), from Uglich to Moscow
- Icon of the Theotokos "Yugskaya" (1615)
- Repose of Archimandrite Justin (Pârvu) of Petru Vodă Monastery, Romania (2013) (Note: See: (in Romanian) Iustin Pârvu. Wikipedia. (Romanian Wikipedia).)

== Icon gallery ==
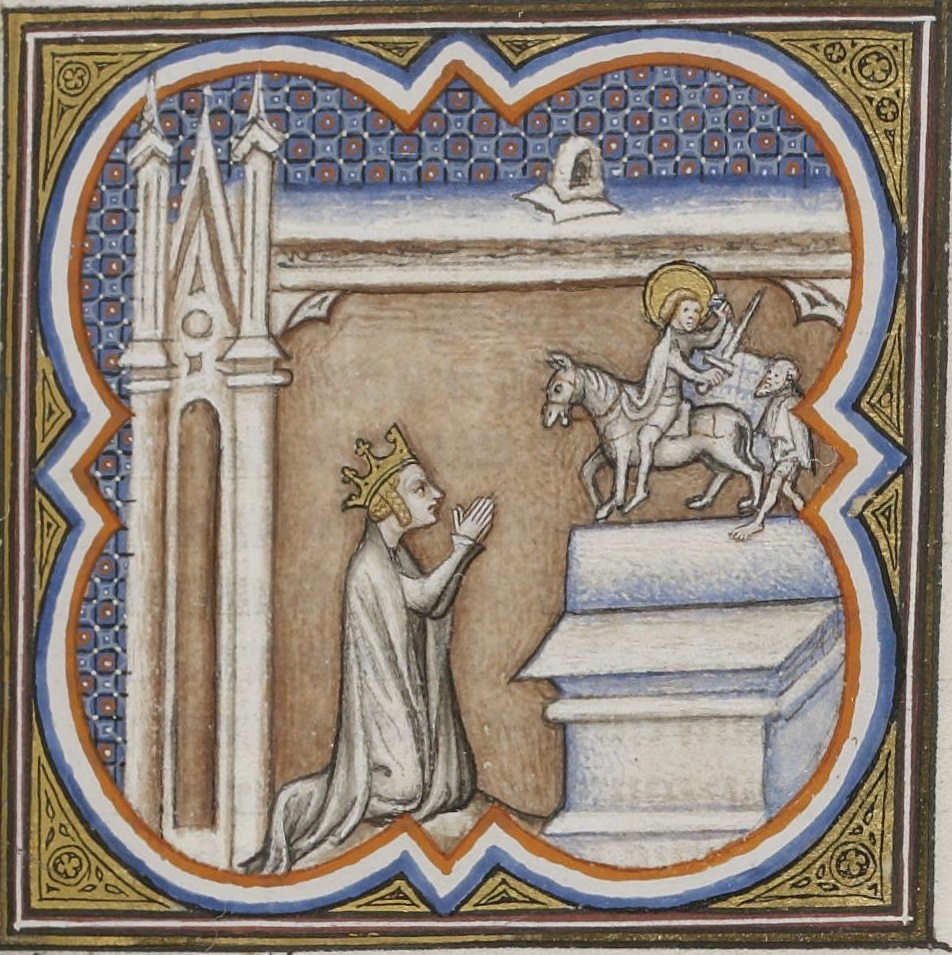
St. Clotilde (Chlotilda), Queen of France, at prayer.

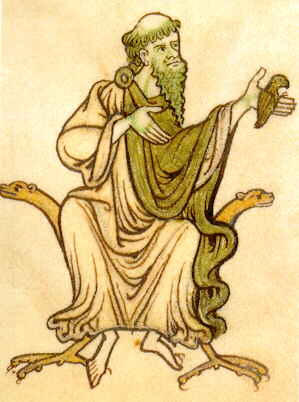
St. Kevin of Glendalough.

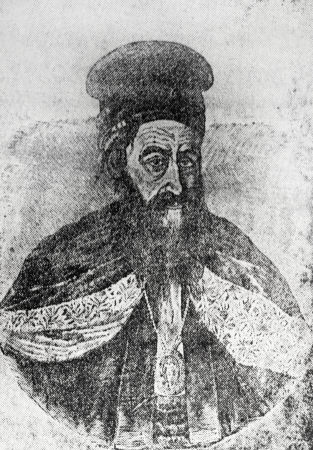
New Hieromartyr Dorotheos of Adrianople, Metropolitan of Adrianople.

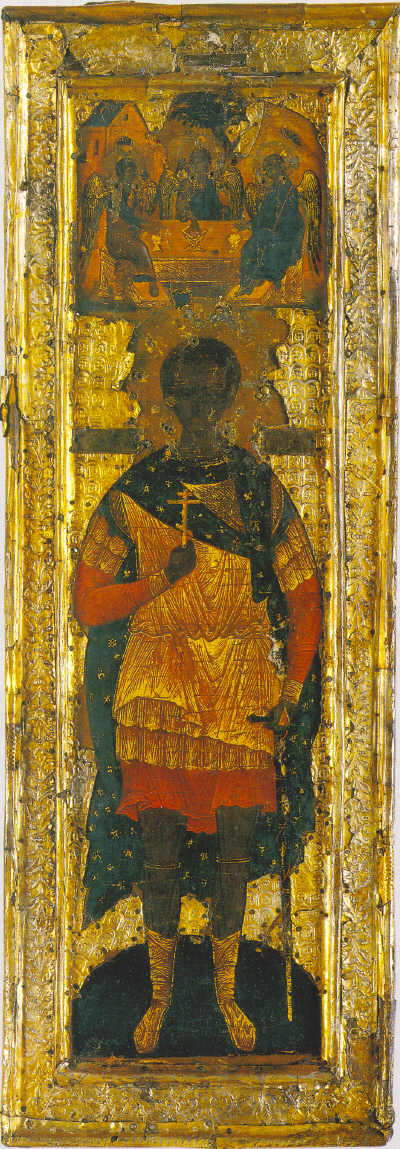
Martyred Crown Prince Dmitry of Uglich.

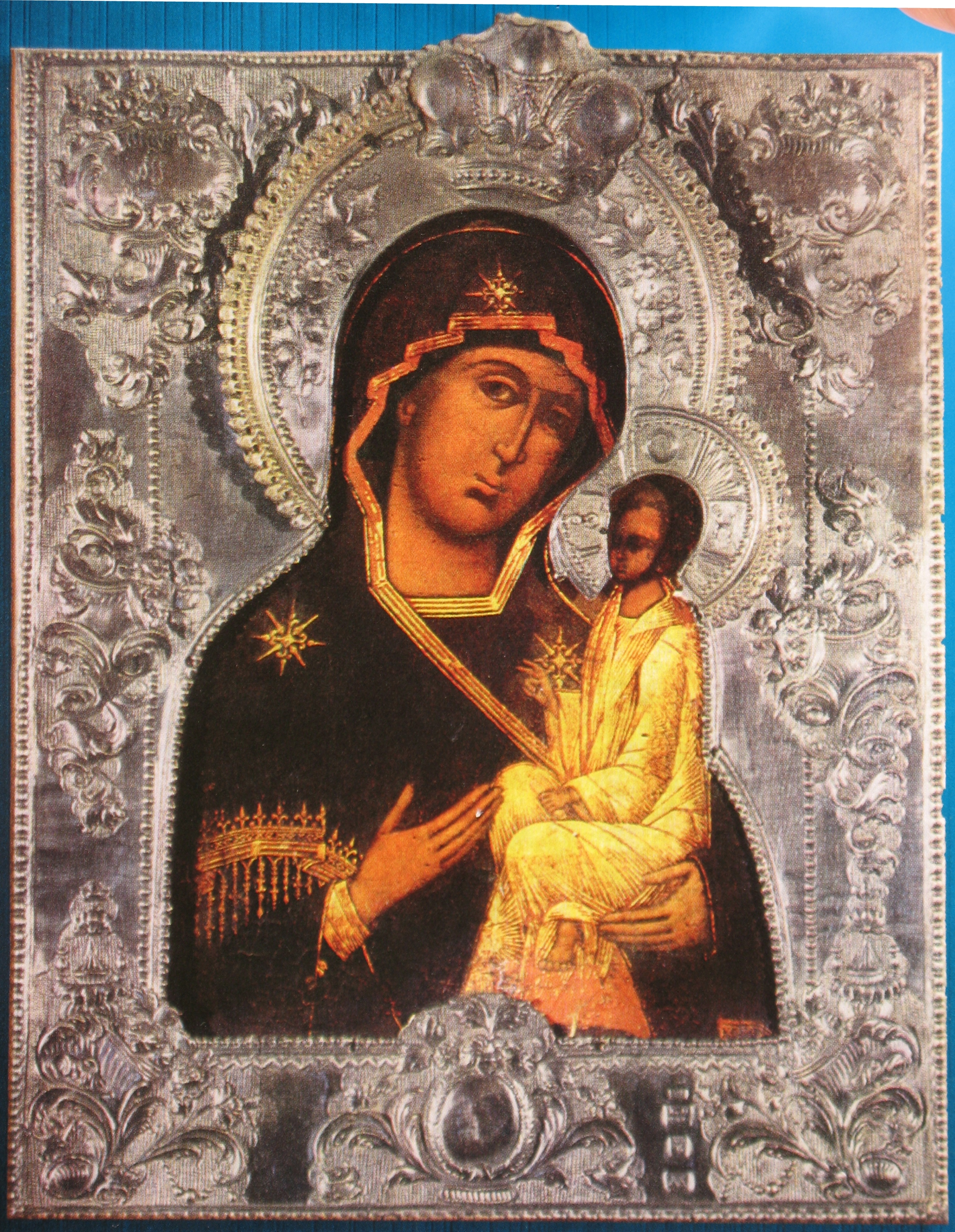
Icon of the Theotokos "Yugskaya".

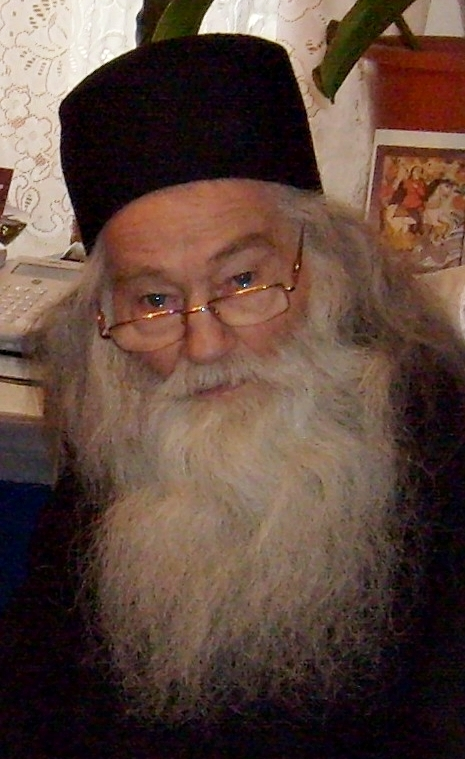
Archimandrite Justin (Pârvu) of Petru Vodă Monastery.

== Sources ==
- June 3/16. Orthodox Calendar (PRAVOSLAVIE.RU).
- June 16 / June 3. HOLY TRINITY RUSSIAN ORTHODOX CHURCH (A parish of the Patriarchate of Moscow).
- June 3. OCA - The Lives of the Saints.
- The Autonomous Orthodox Metropolia of Western Europe and the Americas (ROCOR). St. Hilarion Calendar of Saints for the year of our Lord 2004. St. Hilarion Press (Austin, TX). p. 41.
- The Third Day of the Month of June. Orthodoxy in China.
- June 3. Latin Saints of the Orthodox Patriarchate of Rome.
- The Roman Martyrology. Transl. by the Archbishop of Baltimore. Last Edition, According to the Copy Printed at Rome in 1914. Revised Edition, with the Imprimatur of His Eminence Cardinal Gibbons. Baltimore: John Murphy Company, 1916. pp. 162–163.
- Rev. Richard Stanton. A Menology of England and Wales, or, Brief Memorials of the Ancient British and English Saints Arranged According to the Calendar, Together with the Martyrs of the 16th and 17th Centuries. London: Burns & Oates, 1892. pp. 252–253.

Greek Sources

- Great Synaxaristes: (in Greek) 3 ΙΟΥΝΙΟΥ. ΜΕΓΑΣ ΣΥΝΑΞΑΡΙΣΤΗΣ.
- (in Greek) Συναξαριστής. 3 Ιουνίου. ECCLESIA.GR. (H ΕΚΚΛΗΣΙΑ ΤΗΣ ΕΛΛΑΔΟΣ).
- (in Greek) June 3. Ορθόδοξος Συναξαριστής.

Russian Sources

- (in Russian) 16 июня (3 июня). Православная Энциклопедия под редакцией Патриарха Московского и всея Руси Кирилла (электронная версия). (Orthodox Encyclopedia - Pravenc.ru).
- (in Russian) 3 июня по старому стилю / 16 июня по новому стилю. Русская Православная Церковь - Православный церковный календарь на 2016 год.
- (in Russian) 3 июня (ст.ст.) 16 июня 2014 (нов. ст.). Русская Православная Церковь Отдел внешних церковных связей. (DECR).
