= Plato of Sakkoudion =

Byzantine saint

Saint Plato the Studite
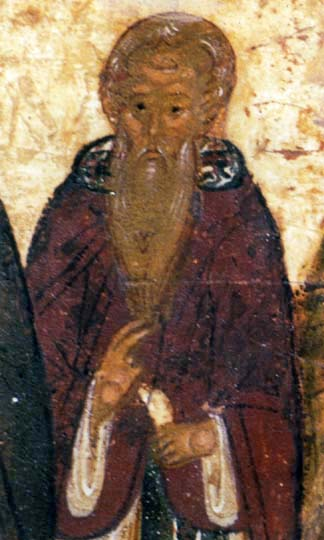

Abbot
- Venerated in: Orthodox Church; Catholic Church
- Feast: 4 April
- Controversy: Iconodule; Opposed Emperor's Remarriage

Plato the Studite, also Plato of Sakkoudion (Greek: Ὅσιος Πλάτων τῆς Μονῆς τῶν Σακκουδίων; c. 735 in probably Constantinople – 4 April 814 in Constantinople), was a Byzantine minor official who became a monk in 759. After refusing the metropolitan see of Nicomedia or the headship of a monastery in Constantinople, in 783 he founded the monastery of Sakkoudion on Mount Olympus in Bithynia, of which he became the first abbot. He is notable, along with his nephew Theodore Stoudites, for his iconodule stance during the Byzantine Iconoclasm and his participation in the Second Council of Nicaea, and to his firm opposition to the second marriage of Emperor Constantine VI to his (Plato's) niece Theodote (the "Moechian Controversy"). He was canonized by the Church, and his feast day is April 4.

== Sources ==
- Lilie, Ralph Johannes (1996). Byzanz unter Eirene und Konstantin VI. (780–802) (in German). Frankfurt am Main: Peter Lang. ISBN 3-631-30582-6.
- Talbot, Alice-Mary; Kazhdan, Alexander (1991). "Plato of Sakkoudion". In Kazhdan, Alexander (ed.). The Oxford Dictionary of Byzantium. Oxford and New York: Oxford University Press. p. 1684. ISBN 0-19-504652-8.
- Lilie, Ralph-Johannes; Ludwig, Claudia; Pratsch, Thomas; Zielke, Beate (2001). "Platon (#6285)". Prosopographie der mittelbyzantinischen Zeit: 1. Abteilung (641–867), Band 4: Platon (# 6266) – Theophylaktos (# 8345) (in German). Berlin and Boston: De Gruyter. pp. 6–9. ISBN 978-3-11-016674-3.
