= Saint Lea =

Italian Roman Catholic saint

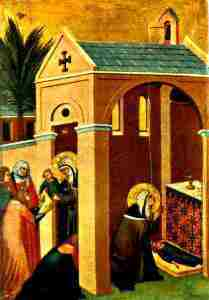
- Died: c. 383
- Venerated in: Roman Catholic Church
- Feast: 22 March
- Patronage: Obedience

Saint Lea (died c. 383) is a fourth-century saint in the Roman Catholic Church based on the authority of Jerome.

Lea of Rome is known only through the testimony of her beloved friend, the learned Saint Jerome. Jerome, a scholarly monk best known for his Latin translation of the Bible (the Vulgate), is the Church's only source of information on St. Lea, whose biographical details are unknown. A noblewoman of Rome, born into wealth and privilege, she was a contemporary of Jerome. However, soon after her marriage she was widowed and left very sound financially. Instead of retiring as a wealthy widow, however, she joined a convent of consecrated virgins in the city—shedding all the money and social standing she possessed. In later years she was named the prioress of the convent. Saint Lea supported the house run by Marcella, working as a menial servant, and later served as the group's superior.

It appears that she died in 384 while St. Jerome and St. Marcella were reading and working on Psalm 73. In a letter relaying her death to others within the city of Rome, St. Jerome writes to St. Marcella that St. Lea, a woman of austerity, obedience and remarkable penances had died. He described her as “blessed,” emphasizing the woman's virtues as being worthy of heaven. Jerome provides no biography for Lea, for he assumes that Marcella knows Lea, and concentrates instead upon her virtues.

Jerome draws a parallel with parable of Lazarus and Dives:

Who will praise the blessed Lea as she deserves? She renounced painting her face and adorning her head with shining pearls. She exchanged her rich attire for sackcloth, and ceased to command others in order to obey all. She dwelt in a corner with a few bits of furniture; she spent her nights in prayer, and instructed her companions through her example rather than through protests and speeches. And she looked forward to her arrival in heaven in order to receive her recompense for the virtues which she practiced on earth.

He then compares her with a consul who had lived in wealth and would find himself in agony in the afterlife and exhorts Marcella to serve Jesus rather than the world. Jerome ends his letter by urging Marcella to remember the lesson of St. Lea's life:

We must not allow … money to weigh us down, or lean upon the staff of worldly power. We must not seek to possess both Christ and the world. No; things eternal must take the place of things transitory; and since, physically speaking, we daily anticipate death, if we wish for immortality we must realize that we are but mortal.

Jerome's use of the adjective "blessed" is taken as sufficient evidence for Lea's veneration by the Roman Catholic Church, where her feast day is March 22.

The name Lea is likely a derivation of Leah coming from a Hebrew word meaning "weary"; or from a Chaldean name meaning "mistress" or "ruler" in Akkadian. In Genesis 29, Leah is seen as being Jacob's first wife and the mother of seven of his children.

== Book of Saints – Lea ==
- Monks of Ramsgate.ea Book of Saints, 1921.. CatholicSaints.Info. 4 November 2014. Web. 12 January 2018. st lea is the patrion saint of obedience

== See also ==
- Saint Lea, patron saint archive
