= Philetus (martyr) =

Christian martyr

Saints Philetus, Lydia, Macedo, Theoprepius (Theoprepides), Amphilochius, and Cronidas
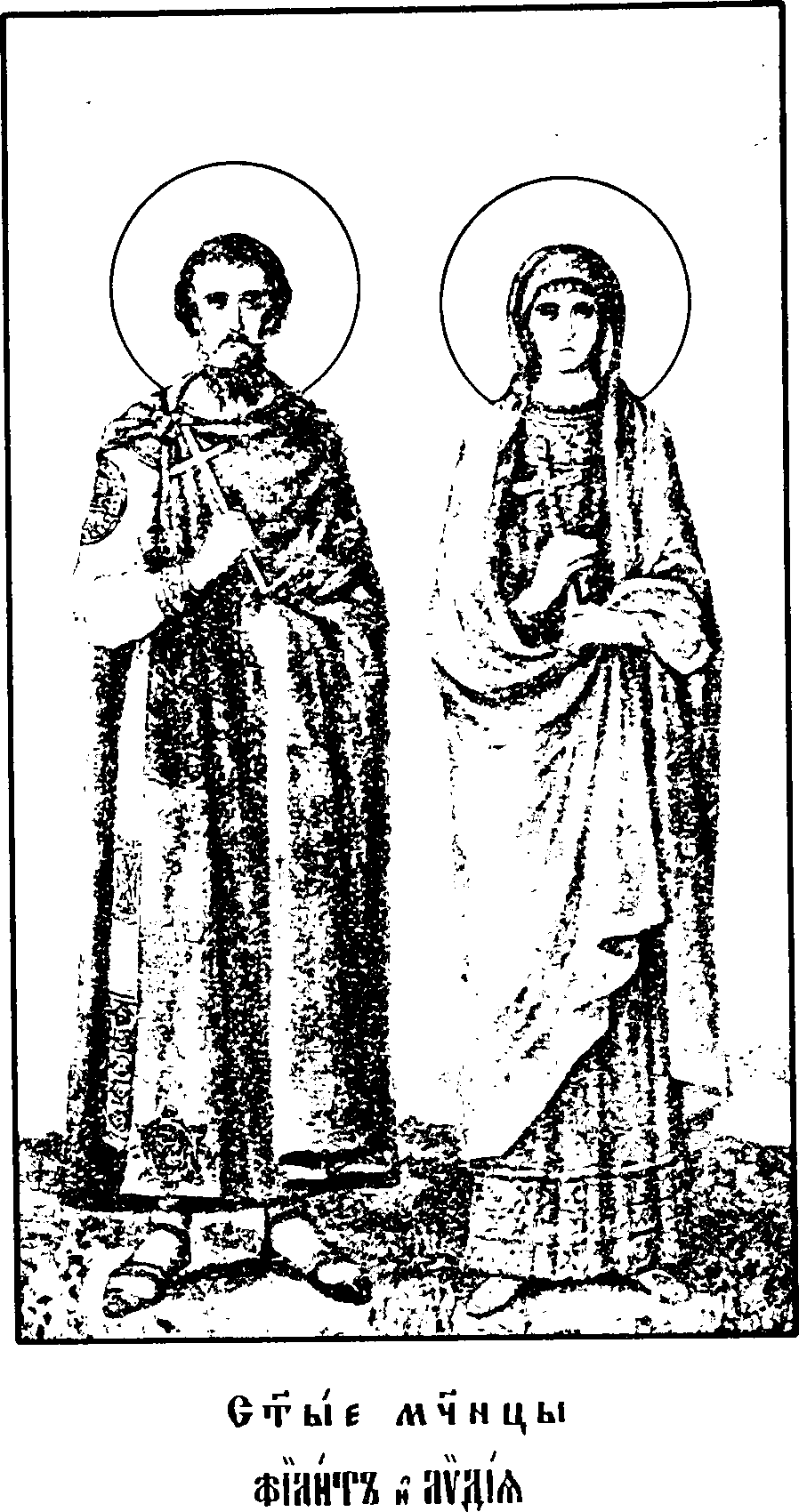

Martyrs
- Died: c. 121; Illyria
- Venerated in: Roman Catholic Church; Eastern Orthodox Church
- Feast: March 27; March 23 (Eastern Orthodox liturgics)

Saint Philetus (Φιλητός) (d. 121) is, along with Saints Lydia (Λυδία), Macedo(n) (Μακεδών), Theoprepius (Theoprepides) (Θεοπρέπιος), Amphilochius (Ἀμφιλόχιος) and Cronidas (Cronides) (Κρονίδης), venerated as a Christian martyr. Philetus was supposedly "...a senator who resided in the province of Illyria and was put to death during the persecution under Emperor Hadrian]..."

According to the Roman Martyrology and Orthodox Synaxarium, they were martyred in Illyria during the reign of Hadrian. The Martyrology also states that Philetus was a senator, that Lydia was his wife; Macedo and Theoprepius their sons; Amphilochius a captain; and Cronidas a notary. Their Acta are considered unreliable.
