= Balaam (disambiguation) =

Balaam was a Biblical prophet.

Balaam may also refer to:

== People ==
- Anthony Balaam (born 1965), American serial killer
- Ellen Balaam (1891–1985), Australian physician

== Other ==
- Barlaam, the legendary Christian saint from the story Barlaam and Josaphat
- Balam (demon)
- A character in Owen Wister's The Virginian
- Baba Balaam, a character from the Pakistani animated series 3 Bahadur

== See also ==
- Balam (disambiguation)
- Balham (disambiguation)
- Ballam
- Barlaam (disambiguation)
- Varlaam (disambiguation)
- Varlam
