= Balam =

B'alam, Balam, Balaam, B'ahlam, Bahlam, Bahlum or Bolom may refer to:

== In Maya history and culture ==
- A Maya language name for "jaguar"; see Jaguars in Mesoamerican cultures

=== Maya rulers ===
- Itzamnaaj Bʼalam (r. ca. 697), ruler of Dos Pilas (a.k.a. "Shield Jaguar")
- Itzamnaaj Bʼalam I (r. ca. 4thC ?), ruler of Yaxchilan (a.k.a. "Shield Jaguar I")
- Itzamnaaj Bahlam II (r. 647–742), ruler of Yaxchilan (a.k.a. "Shield Jaguar II (the Great)")
- Itzamnaaj Bahlam III (r. 769–800?), ruler of Yaxchilan (a.k.a. "Shield Jaguar III")
- Kan Bahlam I (r. 572–583), ruler of Palenque
- Kaloomteʼ Bahlam (r. ca. 511–527), 19th dynastic ruler of Tikal (a.k.a. "Curl Head")
- Kaybʼil Bʼalam (r. early 16thC), Postclassic ruler of the Mam Maya people of the northern Guatemalan highland region at the time of the Spanish conquest
- Kʼinich Kan Bahlam II (r. 683–702), ruler of Palenque, son of K'inich Janaab' Pakal ("Pacal the Great")
- Kʼinich Kʼukʼ Bahlam II (fl. c. 765), ruler of Palenque
- Kʼukʼ Bahlam I (r. 431–435), ruler of Palenque and founder of the state's dynastic line
- Yopaat Bʼalam I (r. 359–?), ruler of Yaxchilan, founder of the state's dynastic line
- Yopaat Bʼalam II (r. ca. 749), ruler of Yaxchilan

=== Maya polities and archaeological sites ===
- Bʼalam (Maya polity), a Classic-era Maya state, known from inscriptions but whose location is not determined
- Balamdzay, archaeological site in the Puuc region
- Balamku, archaeological site in central Yucatán Peninsula
- Balamtun, archaeological site in the Petén Basin region

=== Other uses in Maya culture ===
- Casa Na Bolom, a non-profit foundation for the advancement of the indigenous Maya peoples of Chiapas, Mexico

== Arts and media ==
- Balam (magazine), a magazine of Latin American photography based in Buenos Aires, Argentina
- Balam (1949 film), a 1949 Hindi film
- Balam (1969 film), a 1969 South Korean film
- Balam (2009 film), a 2009 Tamil romantic drama film
- Balamory, a British children's show

== Other people ==
- Balam (singer), Bangladeshi singer and composer
- Balaam, a prophet in the Torah
- David D. Balam, Canadian astronomer
- Richard Balam, mathematician

== Other uses ==
- Asteroid 3749 Balam
- Balam, Iran, a village in Khuzestan Province, Iran
- Balam (demon), in Judeo-Christian tradition

== See also ==
- Balaam (disambiguation)
- Barlaam (disambiguation)
