= Xenophon of Robeika =

Russian saint (d. 1262)

Saint Xenophon of Robeika
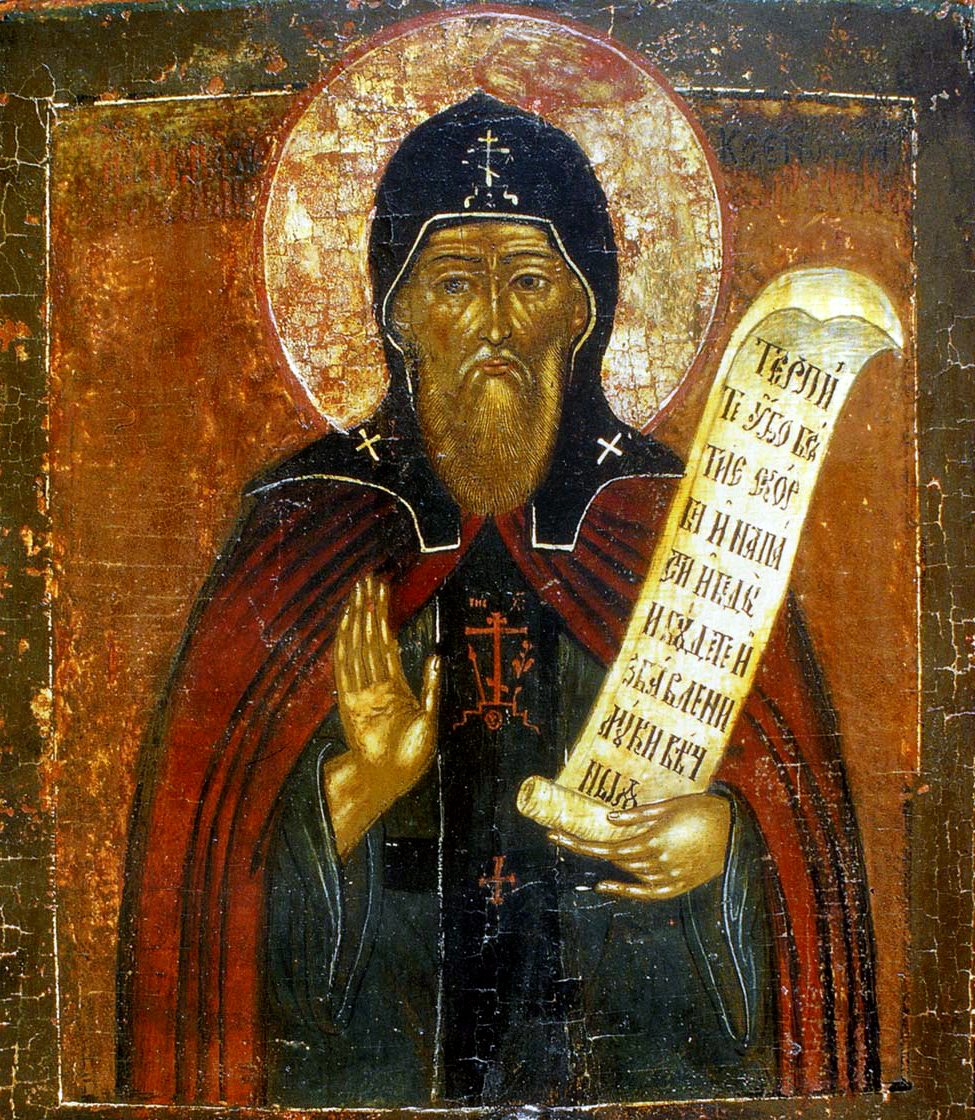
- Icon of St. Xenophon, 17th century

Venerable
- Honored in: Eastern Orthodox Church
- Feast: June 28 (July 11); name day: January 26 (February 8)

Xenophon of Robeika (Russian: Ксенофонт Робейский, romanized: Ksenofont Robeysky; late 14th — early 15th centuries) was a Russian Orthodox monk, later declared a saint (made venerable). Xenophon took his monastic vows at the Lisitsky Monastery from Abbot Barlaam. Xenophon later became hegumen (abbot) of the Khutyn Monastery. Resigning from this post, he later founded the St. Nicholas Monastery on the Robeika River, close to Novgorod. His relics were placed in the monastery's church, which later became a parish church.

== Monastic life ==
Xenophon took his monastic vows at the Lisitsky Monastery from Abbot Barlaam. Xenophon later became hegumen (abbot) of the Khutyn Monastery. Resigning from this post, he later founded the St. Nicholas Monastery on the Robeika River, close to Novgorod.

In another story of the saint, it is said that he departed living with Barlaam because he wanted to live a more ascetic life. The place where he landed on the Robeika is where the St. Nicholas Monastery was eventually founded.

== Biography ==
Many of details of Xenophon's life were lost when his vita was lost. When it was rewritten in the 18th century, his biographers confused Barlaam of Khutyn with Barlaam of Kiev, who lived 200 years earlier.

He was a friend of Anthony of Dymsk, who probably lived in the 12th century and, in turn, was confused by hagiographers with Anthony of Rome, who also lived in the 12th century. The only accounting of Xenophon's life was found only at the end of the 20th century and published by A.G. Bobrov. The vita was written no earlier than the 18th century (it uses the word “object”, a translation of the Latin “objectum”, which entered the Russian language only in 1720). However, the author of the hagiography tried to imitate ancient examples.

Historical information about him is often erroneous. Xenophon and the monastery he founded are repeatedly mentioned in the literature of the 19th and early 20th centuries, but all these mentions are extremely brief; they contain the same set of information: the Monk Xenophon is a disciple of Varlaam of Khutyn, the founding of the monastery is dated back to the 13th century, and sometimes information about the monastery church is reported.

The first specific research focusing on Xenophon and the St. Nicholas Monastery was the work of P. M. Silin, published in 1902. The researcher collected information from various sources in this study and created a general outline of the history of the monastery until the end of the 19th century. He did not question the time of the founding of the monastery in the 13th century. The article provides the text of the hagiography of Xenophon written on his shrine.

The second specific research on the monastery and its founder was written by A. G. Bobrov and published in 1997. A. G. Bobrov published the only surviving copy of the "Life of Xenophon of Robeika" that he discovered and accompanied it with a detailed article. Bobrov rejected the idea of the time of the founding of the monastery in the 13th century, dating it back to the text of the vita.

== Veneration ==
Xenophon's feast day is the day of his death (June 28), the feast day of his patron, the venerable Xenophon of Constantinople (January 26); and on the third Sunday after Pentecost, the Synaxis of the Novgorod Saints.
