= Varlaam =

Varlaam is a variant of the saint's name Barlaam, used in the Orthodox churches due to the Byzantine sound shift from /b/ to /v/. A shortened form is Varlam. It may refer to:

== Places ==
=== Greece ===
- Varlaam, Greece, a village in the southern Ioannina regional unit in Epirus
- Monastery of Varlaam in Meteora, Thessaly, Greece

=== Romania ===
- Varlaam, a village in Gura Teghii Commune, Buzău County
- Varlaam, a village in Adunații-Copăceni Commune, Giurgiu County

== People ==
- Varlaam, Metropolitan of Moscow, reigned 1511 to 1521
- Varlaam Moțoc, Metropolitan of Moldavia (1632-1653)
- Grigory Shyshatsky (1750-1820), a.k.a. Varlaam, Archbishop of Mogilev
- Varlaam of Chikoy (1774-1846)
- Varlaam, a character in Alexander Pushkin's drama Boris Godunov and its adaptations
- Archbishop Varlaam (disambiguation), several persons
- Varlaam of Khutyn, hermit
- Varlaam of Kyiv

== See also ==
- Barlaam (disambiguation), the Western form
- Varlam, a shortened form
