= Gelovani (disambiguation) =

Gelovani may mean:

- Gelovani, a Georgian noble family
- Archil Gelovani (1915–1978), Soviet Georgian military commander
- Mikheil Gelovani (1893–1956), Soviet Georgian actor
- Mirza Gelovani (1917–1944), Georgian poet
- Sopho Gelovani (b. 1984), Georgian singer
- Varlam Gelovani (1878–1915), Georgian politician
