= January 26 (Eastern Orthodox liturgics) =

Day in the Eastern Orthodox liturgical calendar

Eastern Orthodox liturgical calendar
January 25	January 26	January 27
January 26 O.S. ≍ February 8 N.S. January 26 N.S ≍ January 13 O.S.

An Eastern Orthodox cross

January 26 in Eastern Orthodox liturgical calendars is a feast day and a day of commemoration of saints and martyrs. Although some Orthodox churches use the Revised Julian Calendar and others use the traditional Julian calendar, the fixed commemorations for their respective January 26 are broadly the same, no matter which calendar is used. (Note: Despite the dates being the same, the days to which they refer typically differ by 13 days. The notation Old Style or O.S. is sometimes used to indicate a date in the traditional Julian Calendar (the "Old Calendar"). The notation New Style or N.S, indicates a date in the Revised Julian calendar (the "New Calendar").)

== Saints ==
- Martyrs Ananias the priest, Peter the prison guard, and seven soldiers, in Phoenicia (295)
- The Holy Two Martys of Phrygia
- Venerable Ammon of Egypt (350), disciple of Saint Anthony the Great
- Venerable Symeon "the Ancient" of Mount Sinai (c. 390)
- Saint Paula of Rome (Paula of Palestine), monastic foundress in Palestine (404) (Note: A Roman lady of noble birth, she married a patrician and had five children, among them St. Eustochium and St. Blaesilla. Left a widow when she was thirty-two, she presided for twenty years over the sisterhood she had founded in Bethlehem. She also established a guest house for pilgrims there.) (Note: "At Bethlehem of Juda, the demise of St. Paula, widow, mother of St. Eustochium, virgin of Christ, who abandoned her worldly prospects, though she was descended from a noble line of senators, distributed her goods to the poor, and retired to the manger of our Lord, where, adorned with many virtues, and crowned with a long martyrdom, she departed for the kingdom of heaven. Her admirable life was written by St. Jerome.")
- Venerable Gabriel, Abbot of the monastery of Saint Stephanos in Jerusalem (c. 490)
- Venerable Xenophon and his wife Mary, and their two sons Saints Arcadius and John, of Constantinople (6th century) (Note: Not to be confused with Venerable Xenophon (celebrated on April 24), † 1018, the builder of the Xenophontos monastery.) (Note: Name day celebrated today includes: Xenophon (Ξενοφῶν).)
- Saint Theodore of Ajareli.

== Pre-Schism Western saints ==
- Saint Conon, Bishop and monastic founder on the Isle of Man (648)
- Saint Theofrid (Theofroy), a monk at Luxeuil in France who became Abbot of Corbie, and a Bishop (c. 690)
- Saint Athanasius, honoured as a bishop in Sorrento in the south of Italy
- Saint Alphonsus of Astorga, Bishop of Astorga in Spain (9th century) (Note: Bishop of Astorga in Spain, he went to live as a simple monk at the monastery of St. Stephen de Ribas de Sil in Spanish Galicia.)
- Saint Ansurius (Aduri, Asurius, Isauri), Bishop of Orense in Galicia (925) (Note: Bishop of Orense in Galicia, he helped found the monastery of Ribas de Sil in Spain. He became bishop in 915, but in 922 became a simple monk at the monastery. After his repose he was venerated there, together with seven other bishops who had followed his example.)

== Post-Schism Orthodox saints ==
- Venerable Clement of Mt. Sagmation (1111)
- Blessed David IV the Builder (the Restorer), King of Georgia (1125)
- Venerable Xenophon, Abbot of Robeika, Novgorod (1262)
- Venerable Arcadius of Vyaznikovsky (1592) (Note: (in Russian) Прп. Аркадий Вязниковский (+1592). Also commemorated on the "Synaxis of the Saints of Vladimir" (Собор Владимирских святых), June 23.)
- Saint Joseph Naniescu of Suceava, Metropolitan of Moldova, Romania (1902) (Note: "Metropolitan Iosif Naniescu has been canonized under the name of the Holy Hierarch Joseph the Merciful, the Metropolitan of Moldova, to be celebrated on January 26 (new style).")

=== New martyrs and confessors ===
- New Nun-martyr Matushka Maria Lelyanova of Gatchina (1932) (Note: See: (in Russian) Мария Гатчинская. Википедии. (Russian Wikipedia).) (see also: April 4)
- New Hieromartyr Cyril, Metropolitan of Kazan (1937)
- New Hieromartyr Arcadius (1938)
- Martyr John Popov (1938) (Note: See: (in Russian) Попов, Иван Васильевич (богослов). Википедии. (Russian Wikipedia).)

== Other commemorations ==
- Commemoration of the Great Earthquake at Constantinople (447-448), during the reign of Emperor Theodosius II (r. 408–450) (Note: Both the Constantinian and the original Theodosian walls were severely damaged, in two earthquakes, on 25 September 437 and on 6 November 447. The latter was especially powerful, and destroyed large parts of the wall, including 57 towers. Subsequent earthquakes, including another major one in January 448, compounded the damage. Theodosius II ordered the praetorian prefect Constantine to supervise the repairs, made all the more urgent as the city was threatened by the presence of Attila the Hun in the Balkans.) (see also: September 25)
- Translation of the relics (845) of Venerable Theodore the Confessor, Abbot of the Studion (826), (Note: November 11.) and his brother Saint Joseph the Confessor, (Note: July 14.) Archbishop of Thessalonica (832)
- Repose of Metropolitan Gabriel of Novgorod and Saint Petersburg (1801) (Note: See: (in Russian) Гавриил (Петров). Википедии. (Russian Wikipedia).)

== Icon gallery ==
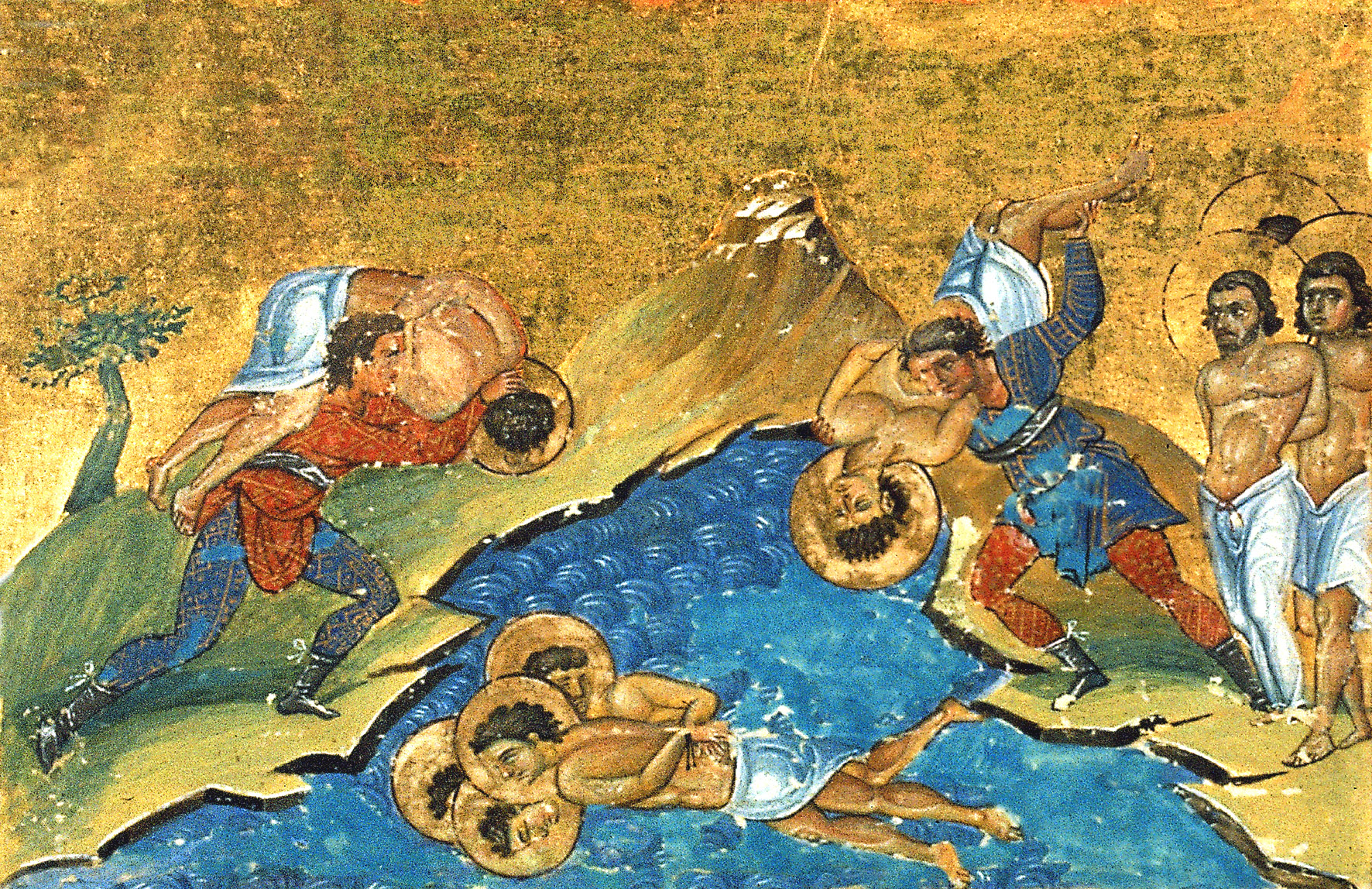
Martyrs Ananias the priest, Peter the prison guard, and seven soldiers, in Phoenicia.
(Menologion of Basil II, 10th century).

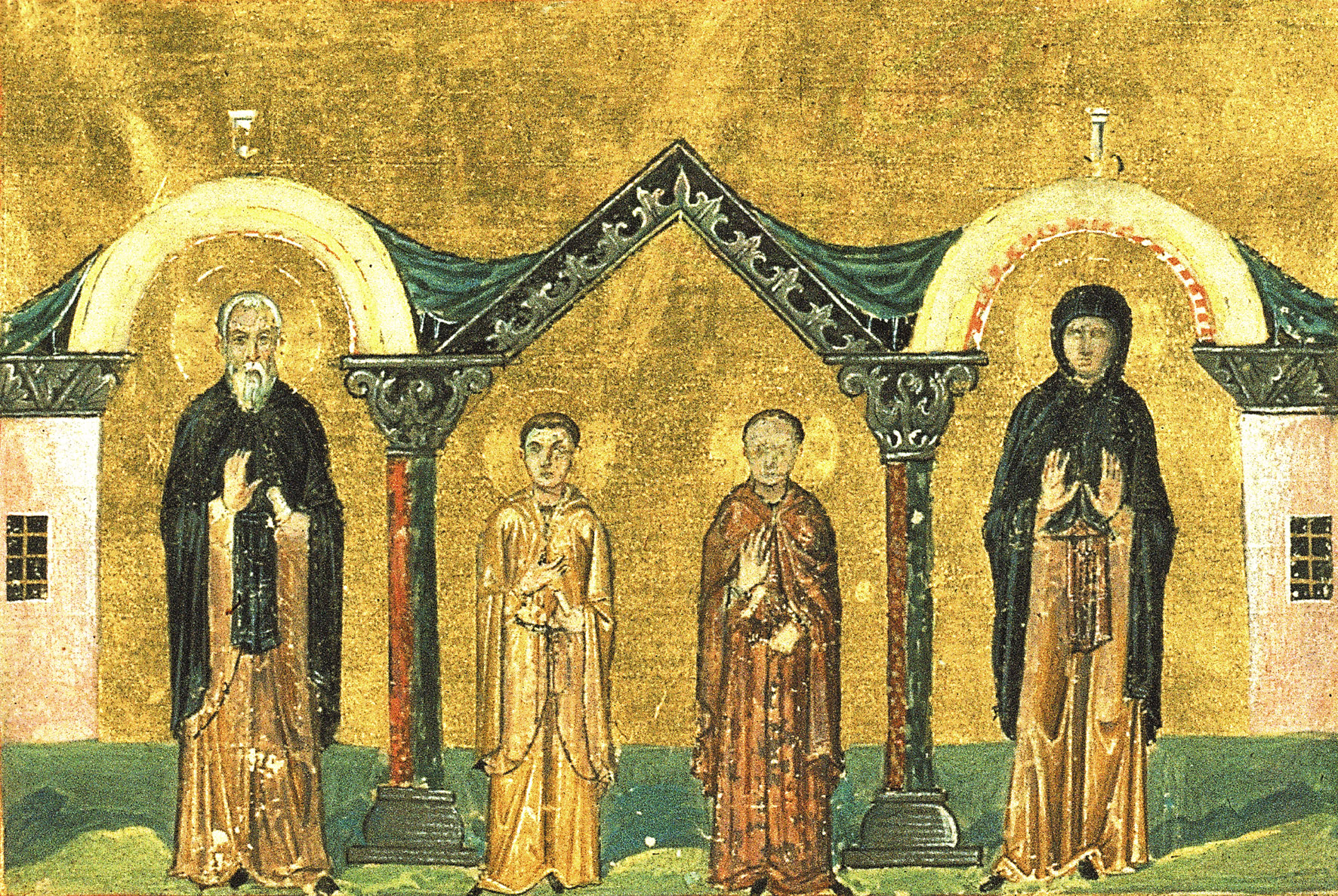
Venerable Xenophon and his wife Mary, and their two sons Sts. Arcadius and John.
(Menologion of Basil II, 10th century).

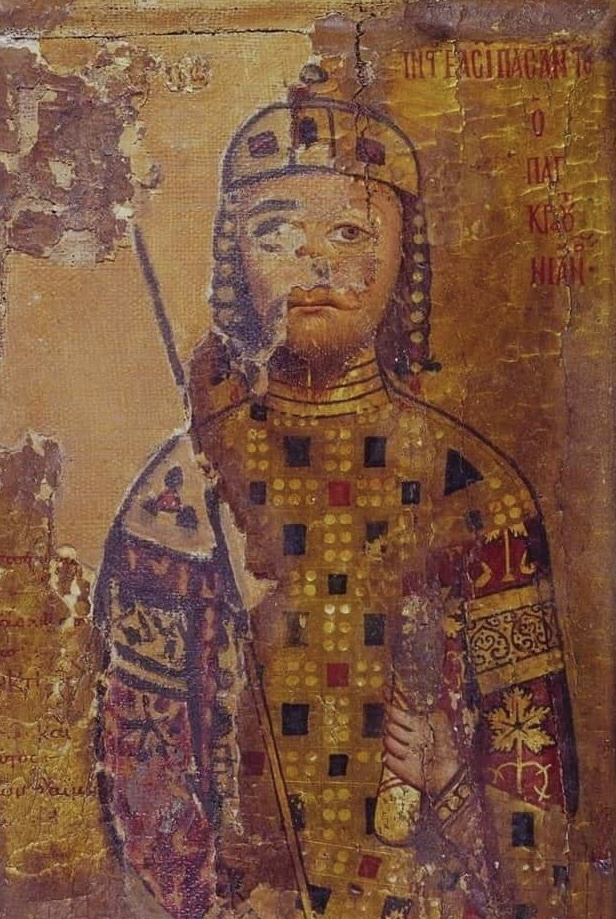
David IV on 12th century icon at Saint Catherine's Monastery.

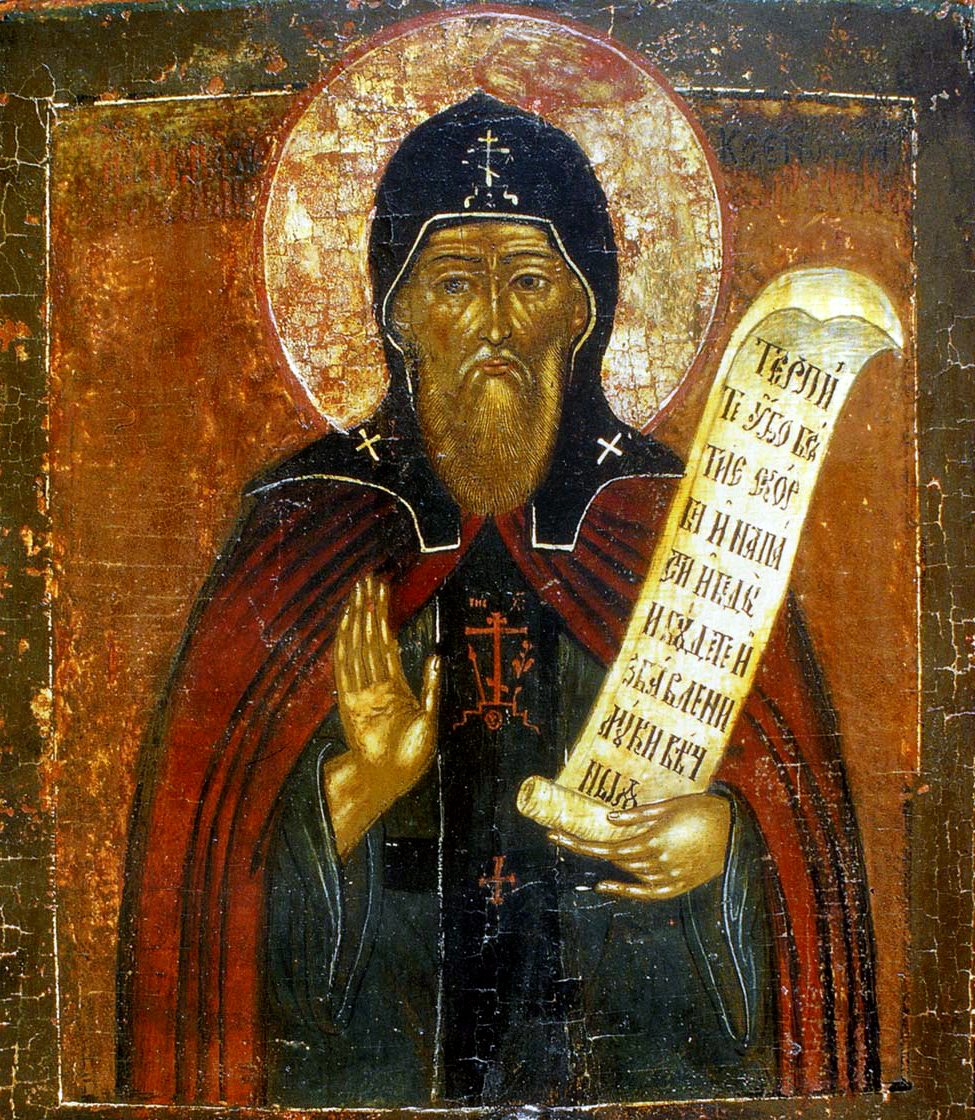
Venerable Xenophon, Abbot of Robeika, Novgorod.

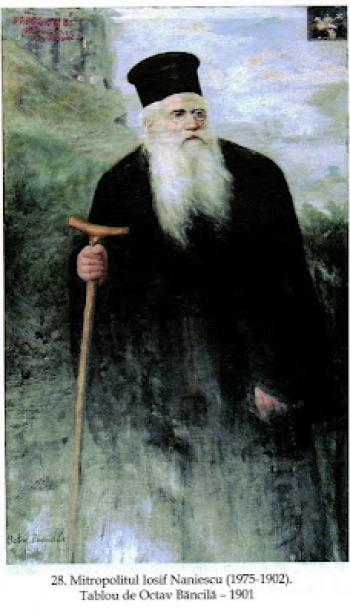
Holy Hierarch Joseph the Merciful, the Metropolitan of Moldova.

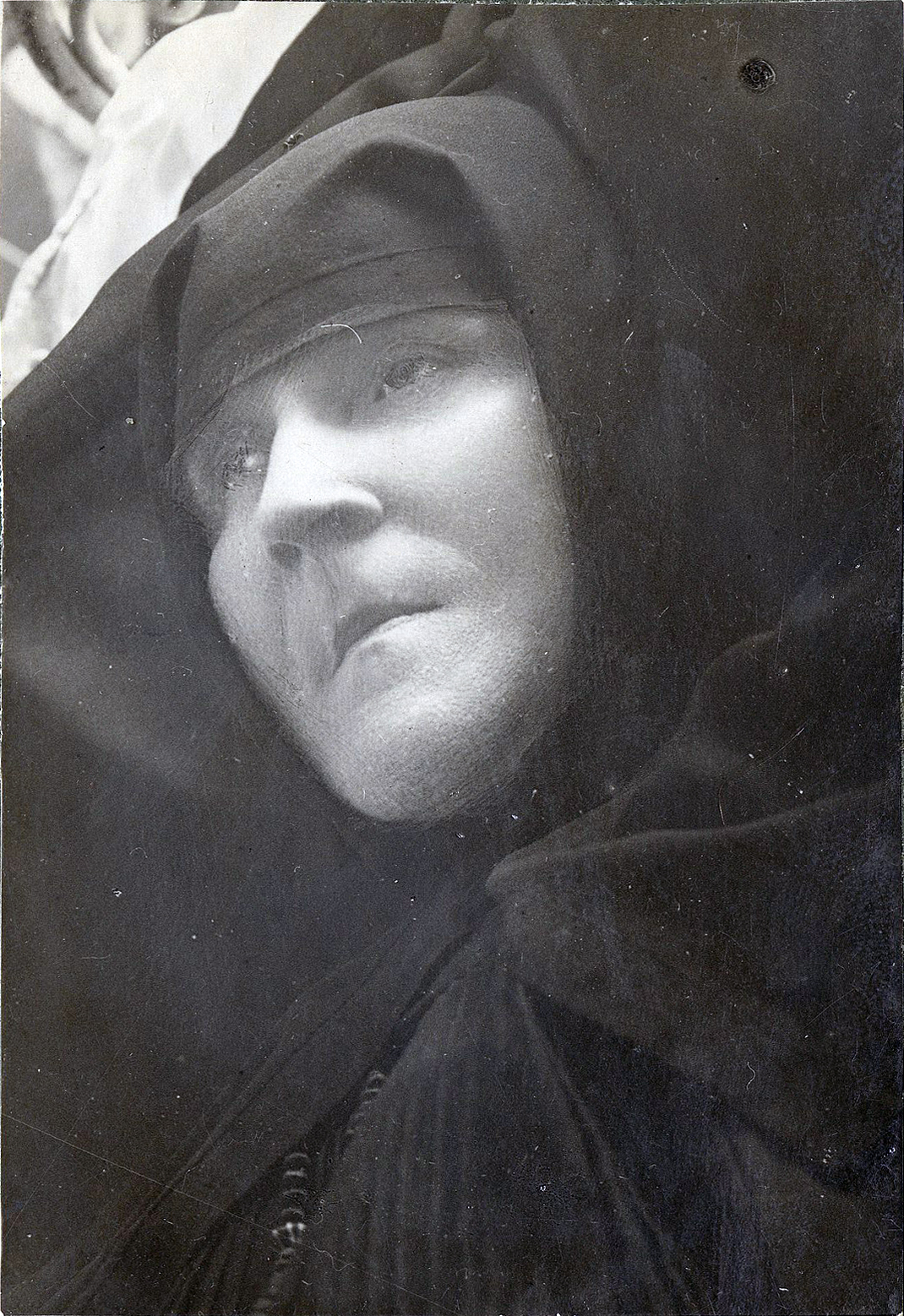
New Nun-martyr Matushka Maria (Lelyanova) of Gatchina.

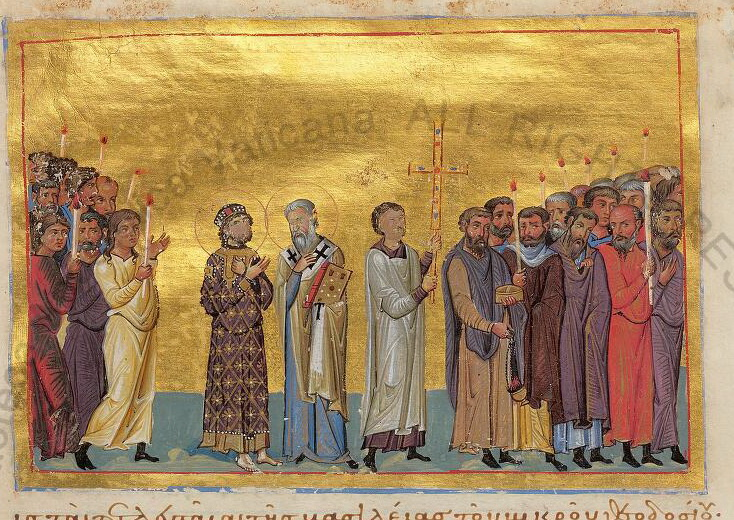
Commemoration of the Great Earthquake of Constantinople (mid-5th century).
(Menologion of Basil II, 10th century).

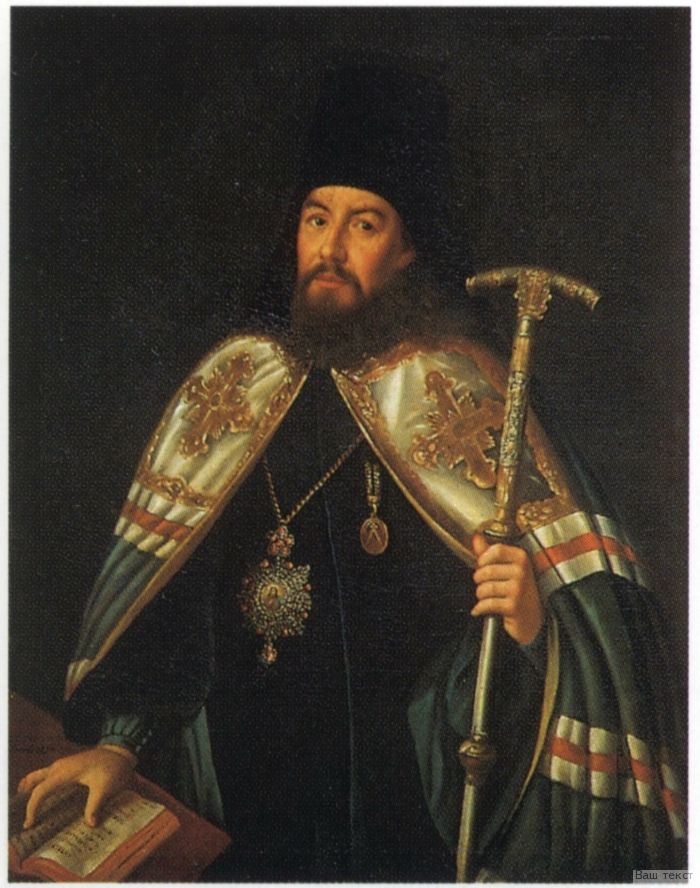
Metropolitan Gabriel of Novgorod and Saint Petersburg.

== Sources ==
- January 26 / February 8. Orthodox Calendar (PRAVOSLAVIE.RU).
- February 8 / January 26. HOLY TRINITY RUSSIAN ORTHODOX CHURCH (A parish of the Patriarchate of Moscow).
- January 26. OCA - The Lives of the Saints.
- The Autonomous Orthodox Metropolia of Western Europe and the Americas (ROCOR). St. Hilarion Calendar of Saints for the year of our Lord 2004. St. Hilarion Press (Austin, TX). p. 10.
- January 26. Latin Saints of the Orthodox Patriarchate of Rome.
- The Roman Martyrology. Transl. by the Archbishop of Baltimore. Last Edition, According to the Copy Printed at Rome in 1914. Revised Edition, with the Imprimatur of His Eminence Cardinal Gibbons. Baltimore: John Murphy Company, 1916. pp. 26–27.
- Rev. Richard Stanton. A Menology of England and Wales, or, Brief Memorials of the Ancient British and English Saints Arranged According to the Calendar, Together with the Martyrs of the 16th and 17th Centuries. London: Burns & Oates, 1892. p. 36.

Greek Sources

- Great Synaxaristes: (in Greek) 26 ΙΑΝΟΥΑΡΙΟΥ. ΜΕΓΑΣ ΣΥΝΑΞΑΡΙΣΤΗΣ.
- (in Greek) Συναξαριστής. 26 Ιανουαρίου. ECCLESIA.GR. (H ΕΚΚΛΗΣΙΑ ΤΗΣ ΕΛΛΑΔΟΣ).

Russian Sources

- (in Russian) 8 февраля (26 января). Православная Энциклопедия под редакцией Патриарха Московского и всея Руси Кирилла (электронная версия). (Orthodox Encyclopedia - Pravenc.ru).
- (in Russian) 26 января (ст.ст.) 8 февраля 2014 (нов. ст.). Русская Православная Церковь Отдел внешних церковных связей. (DECR).
