= Varlamov =

Varlamov (Russian: Варла́мов, IPA: /vɐrˈɫɑˑməf/) is a Russian or Ukrainian masculine surname, derived from the saint's name Barlaam. Its feminine counterpart is Varlamova (Russian: Варла́мова, IPA: /vɐrˈɫɑˑmɐvə/). It may refer to:

== People ==
- Aleksandr Varlamov (b. 1979), diver who has represented both Russia and Belarus during his career.
- Alexander Egorovich Varlamov (1801–1848), Russian composer
- Alexander Vladimirovich Varlamov (1904–1990), Russian composer
- Andrey Varlamov (b. 1954), Italian theoretical physicist
- Daria Varlamova, Australian pageant titleholder
- Evgeny Varlamov (b. 1976), Russian ice hockey defender
- Galina Varlamova (1951–2019), Russian writer, philologist and folklorist
- Igor Varlamov (b. 1971), retired Russian footballer
- Ilya Varlamov (b. 1984), Russian journalist
- Ivan Varlamov (1937–2020), retired Soviet footballer
- Konstantin Varlamov (1848–1915), Russian stage actor
- Nina Varlamova (1954–2008), Russian politician
- Semyon Varlamov (b. 1988), Russian ice hockey goaltender
- Sergei Varlamov (b. 1978), Ukrainian former NHL hockey player
- Valentin Varlamov (1934–1980) Cosmonaut candidate/instructor
- Viktor Varlamov (b. 1948), former Soviet speedskater
- Yevgeni Varlamov (b. 1975), retired Russian footballer, currently coaching at CSKA Moscow

== Places ==
Varlamov is also the name of several rural localities in Russia

== See also ==
- Varlam, the first name which Varlamov is derived from. Also used as a surname.
- Varlaam (disambiguation), alternative form of the first name
