= Archbishop Varlaam =

- Victor Solowij (1891–1966), archbishop of the Ukrainian Autocephalic Orthodox Church
- Archbishop Varlaam (Pikalov) (1885–1946), archbishop of the Russian Orthodox Church
- Barlaam (Shyshatsky) (1750–1820), archbishop of the Russian Orthodox Church
- Varlaam (Vanatovich) (1680–1752), Ukrainian archbishop of the Russian Orthodox Church
