= Barlaam =

Barlaam may refer to:

- Barlaam, legendary Christian saint, teacher of prince Josaphat in India in the Barlaam and Josaphat tale
- Barlaam of Antioch (died 304), Christian martyr
- Barlaam of Kiev (11th century), saint in the Russian Orthodox Church
- Barlaam of Khutyn (died 1192), Russian saint
- Barlaam of Seminara (c. 1290–1348), Italian scholar and theologian, notable as an opponent of Gregory Palamas
- Barlaam (14th century), namesake of the Monastery of Varlaam
- Barlaam (Shyshatsky) (1750–1820), defrocked Archbishop of Mogilev and Vitebsk

== See also ==
- Balaam (disambiguation),
- Varlaam (disambiguation), Orthodox version of the name, due to the Byzantine sound shift from /b/ to /v/
- Varlam, variant of the above
