= Kyriivka =

Village in Ukraine

Coordinates: 51°36′18″N 32°35′03″E

Kyriivka (Ukrainian: Киріївка) is a village in the Sosnytsia Territorial Community of Koriukivka Raion of Chernihiv Oblast, Ukraine. The population is 558 people.

== History ==
Neolithic and Bronze Age settlements (6-4 and 2 millennia BC), two settlements and a burial ground of the 1st century AD, a settlement and the mound of the Ruthenian period (11th - 12th centuries) were found near the village.

In the locality "Maslov Borok" there are traces of an ancient settlement with finds of stone arrowheads ("Thunder arrows"). On the village territory it were existed Early Siversk settlement and the little town of princely times at the river Ubid.

The village was finally established on modern territory in the Polish historical period under the Oleksandr Pisochynskyi.

It is known that in 1654 there was the church and the mill in the village and a mill. According to the census of 1666 - 36 Household.

In 1770 there were 577 parishioners of the local church.

In 1781 there were 95 houses in the village. In 1810 - 190 inhabitants, in 1885 - 758 inhabitants in 130 Households. In 1897 - 159 households, 1057 inhabitants. 1973 - 286 households and 903 inhabitants. In 2014, the village had 424 inhabitants.

In the first half of the 17th century a wooden Church of the Transfiguration was built. The current church was built in 1904 in the classical style of monumental architecture, typical of the early twentieth century

In 1891 year in Kyriivka there was born Victor Sylvestrovych Solowij (Archbishop Varlaam) - archbishop of the Ukrainian Autocephalic Orthodox Church known for his public-political and church activism, chairman of the Australian Federation of Ukrainian Organizations in Australia, a member of the higher church administration of the Ukrainian Autocephalic Orthodox Church in Australia and New Zealand.

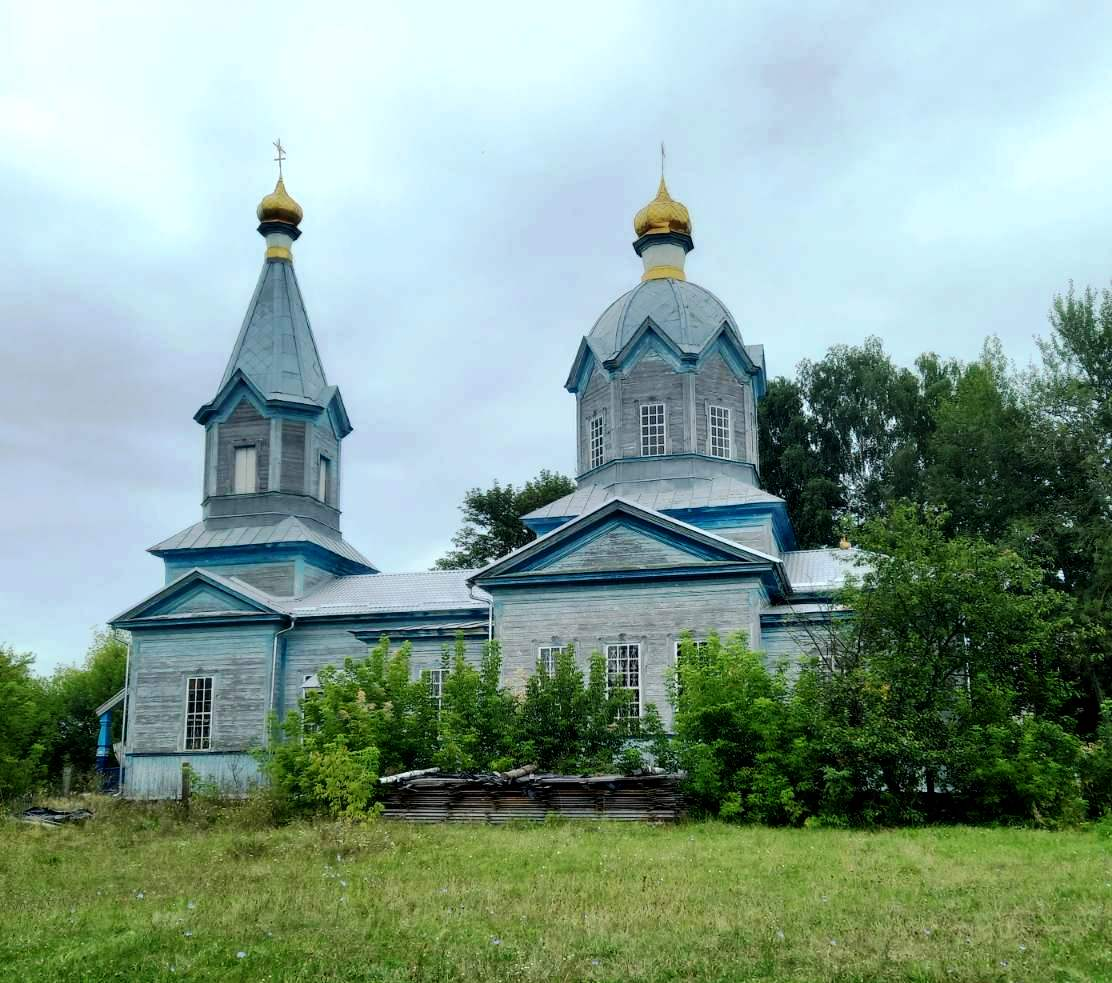
Kyriivka tample

At least six people died of starvation during the famine (Holodomor) of 1932–33 in Kyriivka

=== History of the Kyriivka school ===
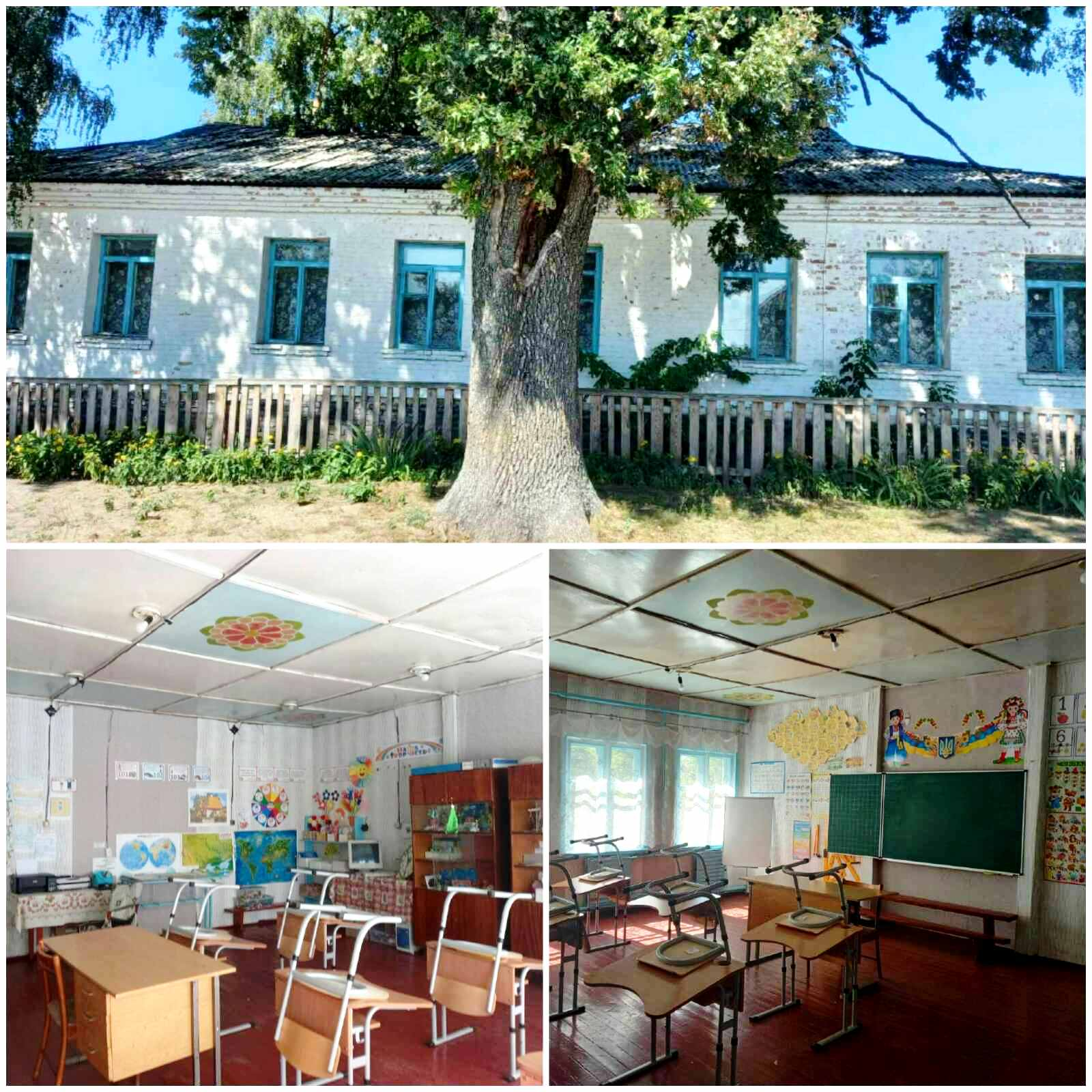
Kyriivka_school

In 1898 a two-class church-parish school was established in Kyriivka. In 1928, the school was reorganized into a four-grade school, in 1947 into a seven-year school (167 pupils and 11 teachers), and in 1956 into an eight-year school.

In 2021, deputies of the Sosnytsia Territorial Council decided to optimize schools in the Sosnytsia region and liquidate Kyryivka School. It is planned to take children by bus 7 kilometers to the school in the neighboring village of Kudrivka.

Villagers have protested against the closure of the school and have repeatedly appealed to local authorities. Residents of the village of Kiriyivka pay attention to the following issues

1. Moral and ethical characteristics and humanity of the members of the Sosnytsia Territorial Council during the decision to liquidate the Kyriivka school

2. Doubts about the impartiality of the members and management of the Sosnytsia Territorial Council and the transparency of decision-making during the liquidation of the Kyriivka School. There are doubts about the transparency of the appointment of the director of the Kudrivka School. Attention is drawn to the fact that in order to preserve Kudrivska Secondary School and the position of its director, the Kyriivka School is being destroyed.

3. In the Ukrainian reality, the village school is the institution which units and holds the village. Villages where schools have been closed are dying fast.

4. Residents of the village of Kiriyivka do not want to let their children go to school in another village.

5. According to the residents of the village of Kyriivka, the school in the village of Kudrivka has many shortcomings and does not meet the requirements of parents. 6. According to the residents of the village of Kyriivka, children have the right to study in their native village.

7. Oksana Rudia, the newly appointed director of Kudrivska School and a member of the Sosnytsia Territorial Council, supported the optimization of the school network, as a result of which the Kyriivka School is being liquidated. At the same time, in her election program, Oksana Rudia declares: "In our difficult times, the main thing is to keep all the institutions that now operate in the villages. Children from villages are not to blame for not being born in Chernihiv or Kyiv and have the right to their school"

8. The district administration, instead of discussing the closure of the school with the residents of the village of Kyryivka, only confronted the residents with the fact that the school in the village will be liquidated.

The Initiative Committee of the Kyriivka Community addressed deputies and the chairman of the Sosnytsia council, the Chernihiv Regional Department of Education, the Deputy Minister of Education and Science of Ukraine, the chairman of the Chernihiv Regional State Administration, the Presidential Commissioner for Children's Rights No responses were received.

The struggle of the residents of the village of Kyryivka for the right of children to study in their native village and, in general, the preservation of the village, continues.

== Famous people ==
Victor Sylvestrovych Solowij (known as Archbishop Varlaam), an archbishop of the Ukrainian Autocephalic Orthodox Church known for his public-political and church activism.
