= Varlam =

Varlam is both a masculine given name and a surname derived from the saint's name Barlaam, used predominantly in Orthodox cultures. Notable people with the name include:

- Varlam Cherkezishvili (1846–1925), Georgian politician and journalist
- Varlam Gelovani (1878–1915), Georgian lawyer and politician
- Varlam Avanesov (1884–1930), Armenian Bolshevik and Soviet communist politician
- Varlam Shalamov (1907–1982), Russian writer, journalist and poet
- Varlam Kilasonia (born 1967), Georgian footballer and manager
- Claudiu Varlam (born 1975), Romanian aerobic gymnast
- Varlam Liparteliani (born 1989), Georgian judoka

== See also ==
- Barlaam (disambiguation), the Western form
- Varlaam (disambiguation), another Eastern Orthodox form
- Varlamov, an East Slavic surname derived from Varlam
