= Novhorod-Siverskyi =

City in Chernihiv Oblast, Ukraine

Novhorod-Siverskyi Новгород-Сіверський Novhorod-Siversk
- City
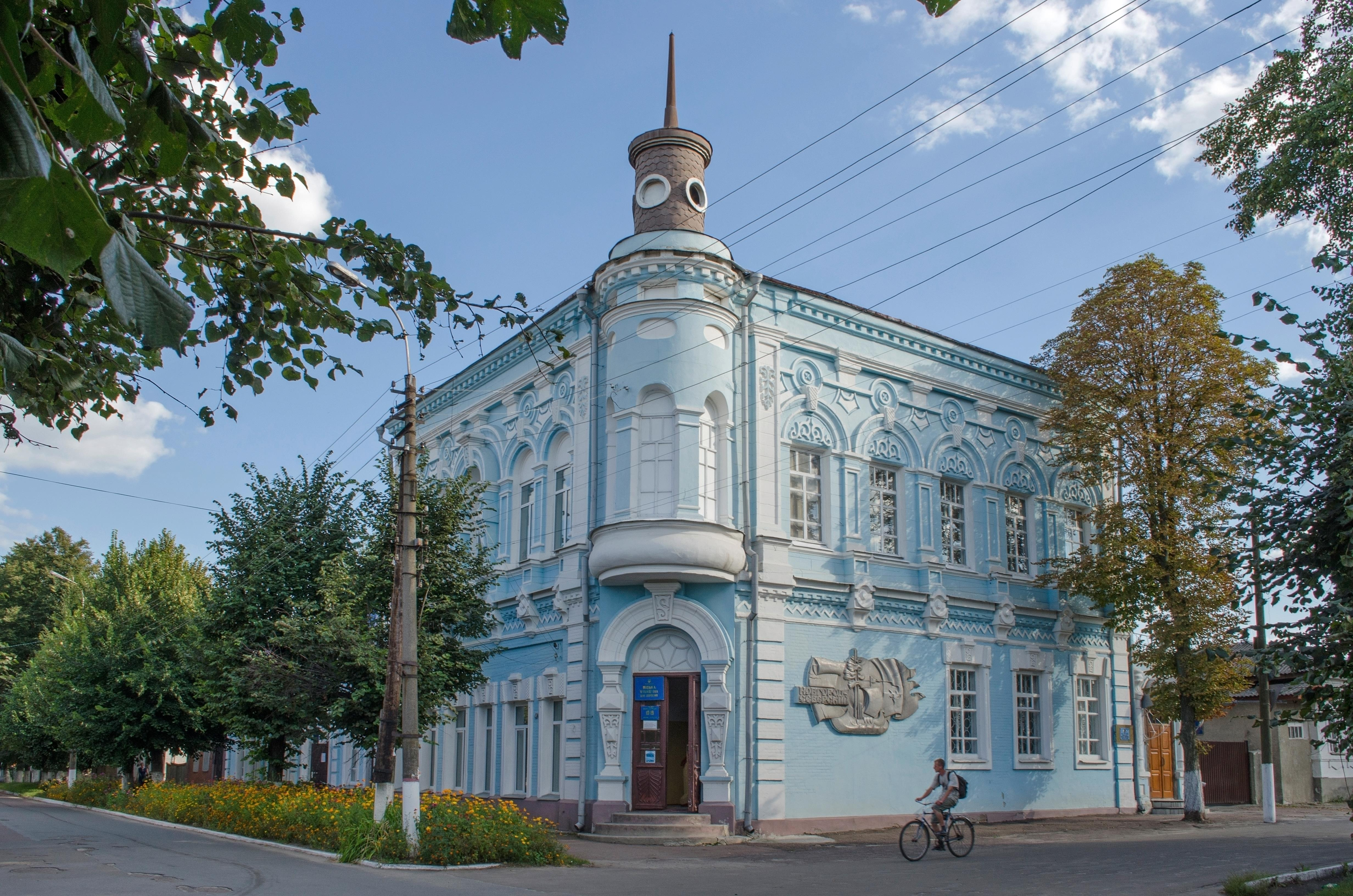
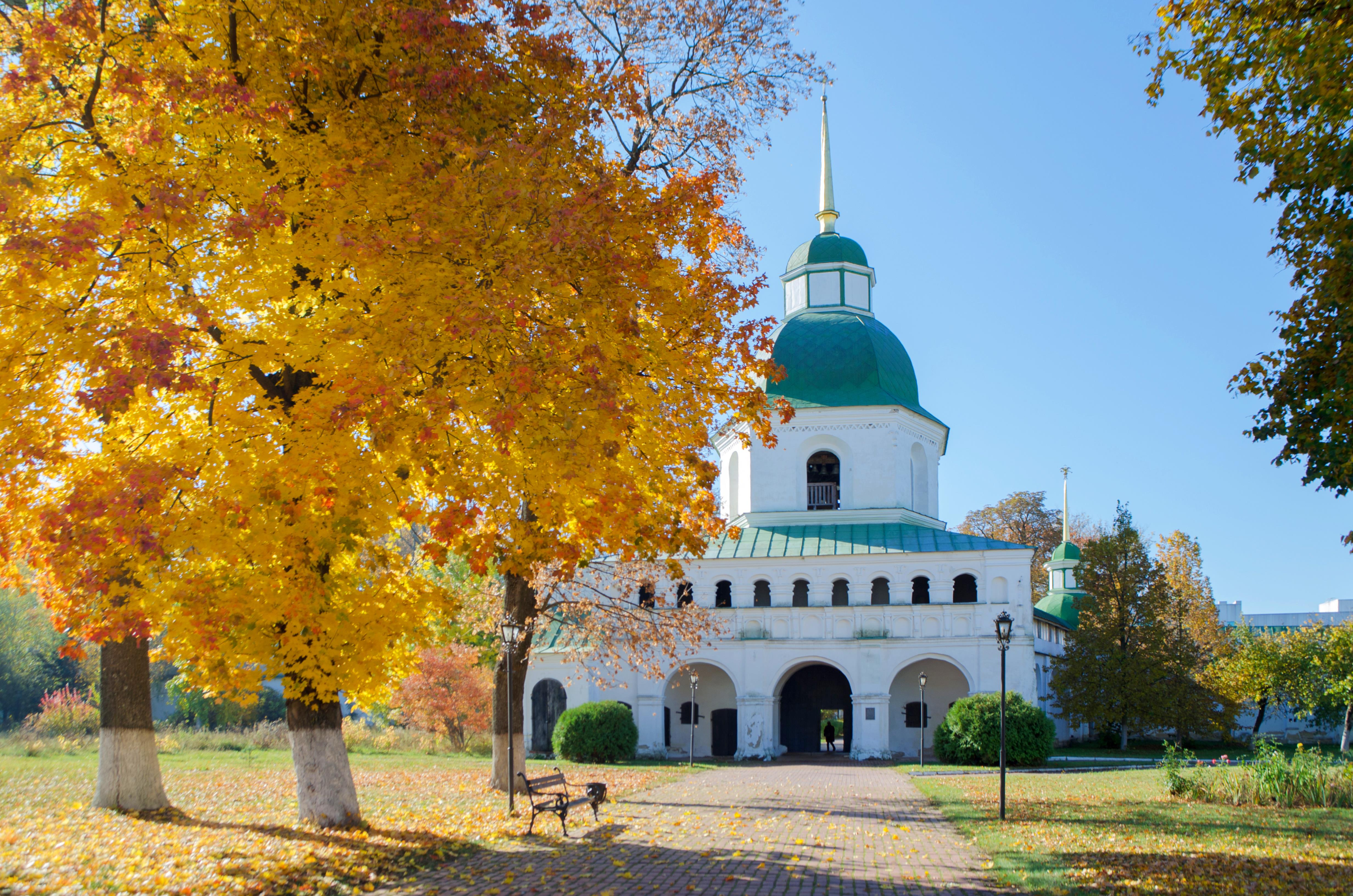
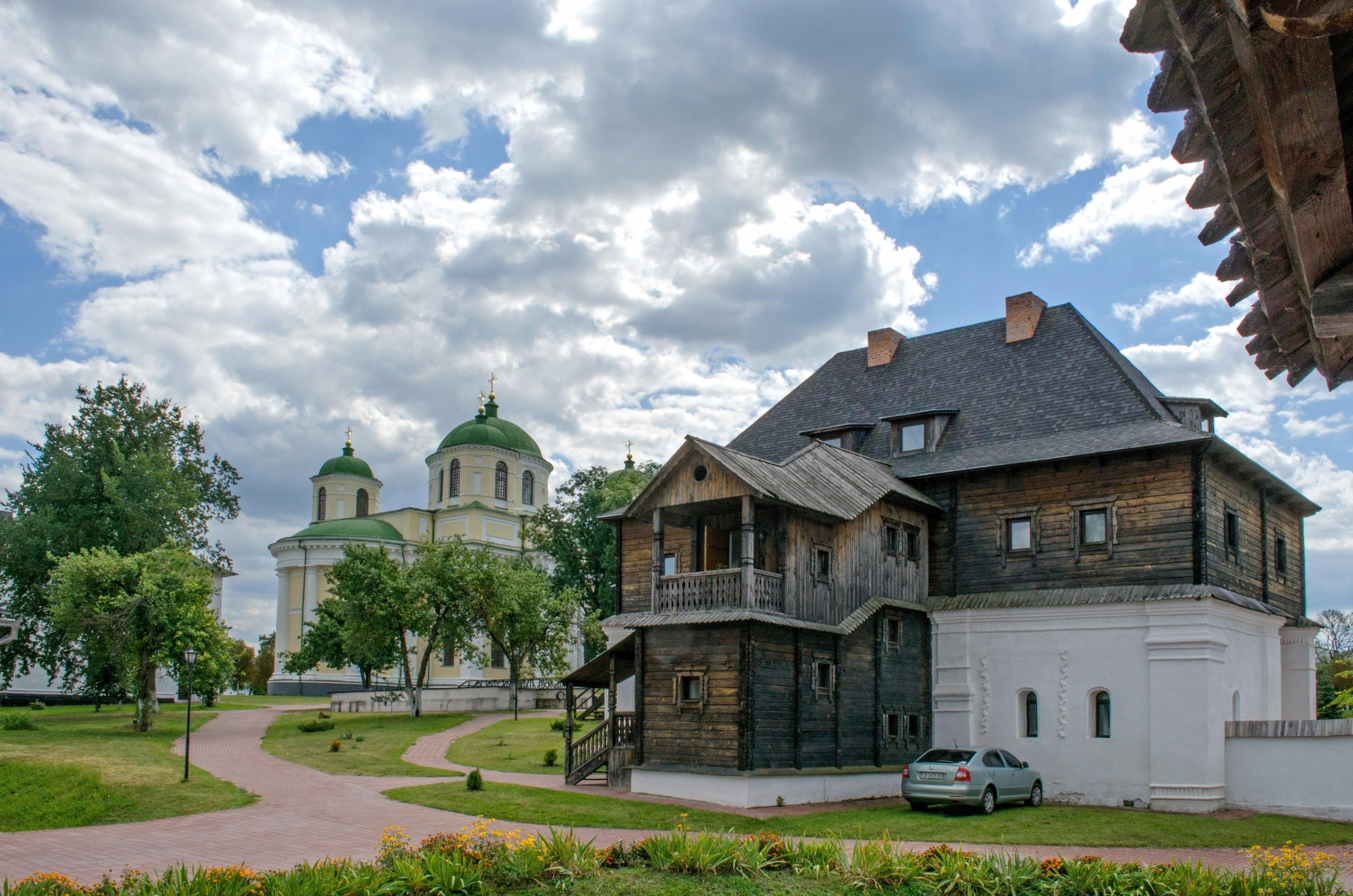
- Clockwise from top: Merchant Medvedev's House; Savior-Transfiguration Cathedral and Monastic Cells; Gate Bell Tower

- Flag Coat of arms

- Location of Novhorod-Siverskyi in Ukraine Novhorod-Siverskyi (Ukraine)
- Coordinates: 51°59′50″N 33°16′00″E
- Country: Ukraine
- Oblast: Chernihiv Oblast
- Raion: Novhorod-Siverskyi Raion
- Hromada: Novhorod-Siverskyi urban hromada
- Established: 980 ad

Area
  - Total: 11.81 km^{2} (4.56 sq mi)

Population (2022)
  - Total: 12,375
  - Estimate (2025): ~12,000
- Time zone: UTC+2 (EET)
  - Summer (DST): UTC+3 (EEST)

Novhorod-Siverskyi (Ukrainian: Новгород-Сіверський, IPA: [ˈnɔu̯ɦorod ˈs⁽ʲ⁾iwersʲkɪj]; Russian: Новгород-Северский, Novgorod-Severskiy), is a historic city in Chernihiv Oblast, northern Ukraine. It serves as the administrative center of Novhorod-Siverskyi Raion. However, until 18 July 2020, it was incorporated as a city of oblast significance and did not belong to the raion. Novhorod-Siverskyi is situated on the bank of the Desna River, 330 kilometres (210 mi) from the capital, Kyiv. It hosts the administration of Novhorod-Siverskyi urban hromada, one of the hromadas of Ukraine. The city's population is 12,375 (2022 estimate).

== History ==
The town was first mentioned in a text by Volodimer Monomakh as Novyi Horod, related to events in the winter of 1078-1079 when Volodimer Monomakh "dispersed" an army of the Cuman Prince Belkatghin, which was recorded in the Laurentian Codex under 1096. Following the Council of Liubech, from 1098, it was the capital of an apanage duchy, Novhorod-Siverskyi Principality, which served as a buffer zone against incursions of the Cumans (Polovtsy) and other steppe peoples. The new duchy became a base of the Kyivan princely dynasty of Olhovychi, which opposed the ruling Monomakhovichi.

One of the numerous campaigns of local princes against the Cumans produced the great monument of early East Slavic literature, the Tale of Igor's Campaign.

After the town's destruction by Mongols in 1239, it passed to the princes of Bryansk and then to the Grand Dukes of Lithuania. It was ruled by Kaributas, son of Algirdas. Muscovy obtained the area following the Battle of Vedrosha in 1503, but lost it to Poland after the Time of Troubles, when it submitted to False Dmitry I in the Battle of Novhorod-Siverskyi. Nowogród Siewierski was granted Magdeburg city rights in 1620 by Polish King Sigismund III Vasa. Under Polish rule, the city was granted Magdeburg Law. It was the easternmost powiat (county) seat of Poland.

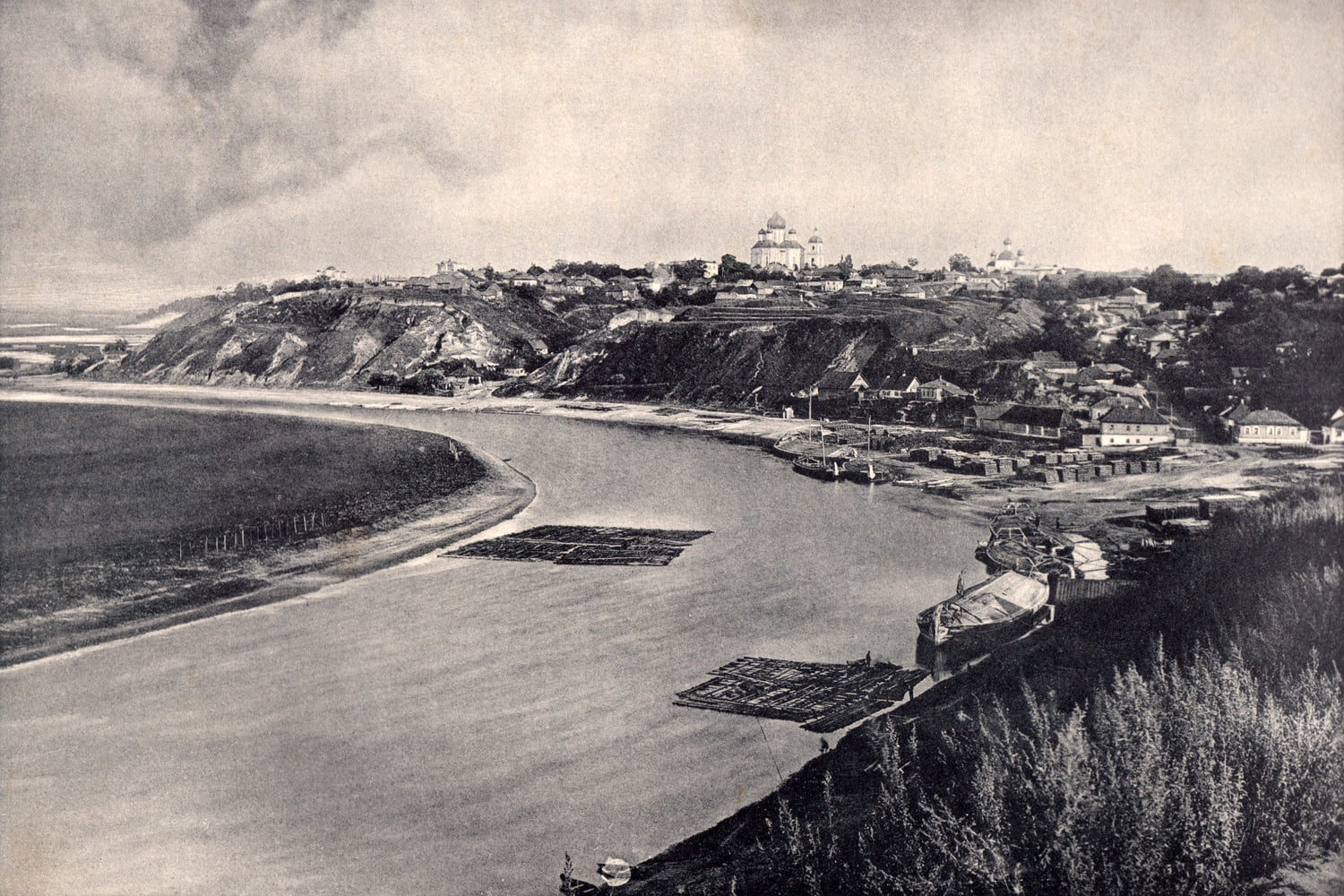
Panorama in 1911

From 1648 Novhorod-Siversky served as a sotnia town of Nizhyn, and from 1663 of Starodub Regiment inside of the Cossack Hetmanate. The town came under the suzerainty of the Tsardom of Russia as a result of the Russo-Polish War (1654–1667). It eventually attained the status of regimental town. The city became a cultural center of Left-bank Ukraine, and between 1674 and 1679 its monastery housed a printing house established by archbishop Lazar Baranovych. Between 1782 and 1796 Novhorod-Siverskyi served as the capital of a separate viceroyalty. In 1788-1789 the first public school in the region was established here, and in 1808 a gymnasium was opened. Thereafter the city's importance steadily declined.

During World War II, Novhorod-Siverskyi was occupied by the German Army from 26 August 1941 to 16 September 1943.

Until 18 July 2020, Novhorod-Siverskyi was designated as a city of oblast significance and did not belong to Novhorod-Siverskyi Raion even though it was the center of the raion. As part of the administrative reform of Ukraine, which reduced the number of raions of Chernihiv Oblast to four, the city was merged into Novhorod-Siverskyi Raion.

The city was occupied with Russian forces from 24 February to 2 April 2022. This caused a humanitarian crisis in the city and forced many civilians to evacuate. Russian troops blocked the entrances and exits of the city with tanks, not even allowing ambulances. At checkpoints, local residents' phones were forcefully taken and broken. The city council destroyed documents related to the Donbas war participants to protect them from Russian troops. On 12 May 2022, the Russian army fired several missiles at a local school, killing three and wounding 19 people.

== Points of interest ==
=== Architecture ===
Despite historic disasters, the town has preserved many architectural monuments, and a branch of the Chernihiv State Historical and Architectural Reserve had been established, which since 1990 has become a separate historical-cultural reserve named after The Tale of Igor's Campaign. The town has managed to maintain random planning in its landscape. The boundary of the town historical center remains vague.

Tourist attractions are located on two high capes divided by ravines: the ensemble of Savior-Transfiguration Monastery and the town centre. The architectural monuments of state significance are scattered on five separate areas which compose the territory of the preserve. The biggest area is the territory of Savior-Transfiguration Monastery. The other areas are Dormition Cathedral, the wooden St. Nicolas Church, a triumphal arch (1786–1787), and shopping arcades (early 19th century).

There are constructions and residential buildings from the 18th and 19th centuries in the town centre. The main point of interest in the town is the former residence of the Chernihiv metropolitans, the monastery of the Saviour's Transfiguration. It features a Neoclassical cathedral (1791–1796, designed by Giacomo Quarenghi), 17th century stone walls, and several ecclesiastic foundations dating from the 16th century. Other landmarks include the Cossack Baroque Assumption Cathedral (late 17th century), a triumphal arch dedicated to a visit by Catherine II (1787), and the wooden church of St. Nicholas (1760).

=== Archeology ===
A Late Paleolithic (Madelenian) site with three gigantoliths, a modified mammoth rib and remains of rich fauna was discovered near the city.

== Demographics ==
As of the 2001 Ukrainian census, Novhorod-Siverskyi had a population of 15,029 inhabitants. In terms of ethnicities, almost 95% of the population are Ukrainians, while 5% claim to have a Russian background. When being asked about their primary languages, almost 66% of the population claimed to be native Ukrainian-speakers, while 34% spoke Russian, which can be attributed to the proximity to the Russian border. Novhorod-Siverskyi has the highest incidence of native Russian-speakers of any settlement in the entire Chernihiv Oblast with a population of more than 10,000 inhabitants. The exact ethnic and linguistic composition was as follows:

Ethnic groups in Novhorod-Siverskyi
| | percent |
| Ukrainians | 93.73% |
| Russians | 5.33% |
| Belarusians | 0.37% |
| Gypsies | 0.19% |
| Jews | 0.13% |
| others | 0.25% |

Native languages in Novhorod-Siverskyi
| | percent |
| Ukrainian | 65.8% |
| Russian | 34.0% |
| Belarusian | 0.1% |
| Romani | 0.1% |
| others | 0.1% |

== Economy ==
Novhorod-Siversky is a centre of food industry, hemp processing, as well as textile and construction industries.

== Notable people ==
- Igor Sviatoslavich (1151–1202) - Prince of Putyvl, Kursk, Novhorod-Siversk and Chernihiv, main hero of the Tale of Igor's Campaign
- Lazar Baranovych (1620–1693) - Ukrainian Baroque poet and writer, Eastern Orthodox archbishop of Chernihiv
- Melkhisedek (Znachko-Yavorsky) (c.1716–1809) - Ukrainian Orthodox bishop
- Barlaam Shyshatsky (1750–1821) - Ukrainian bishop of the Russian Orthodox Church
- Mykhailo Maksymovych (1804–1873) - Ukrainian historian
- Konstantin Ushinsky (1823–1871) - Russian teacher
- Panteleimon Kulish (1819–1897) - Ukrainian writer
- Dmitry Samokvasov (1843–1911) - Russian archaeologist
- Alexander Dmitrievich Mikhailov (1855–1884) - Russian narodnik revolutionary
- Mykola Kybalchych (1853–1881) - Ukrainian inventor and revolutionary in the Russian Empire
- Zino Davidoff (1906–1994) - Swiss businessman, founder of Davidoff cigarette brand
- Volodymyr Pavlovych Naumenko (1852–1919) - Ukrainian politician, member of the Central Rada

== Gallery ==
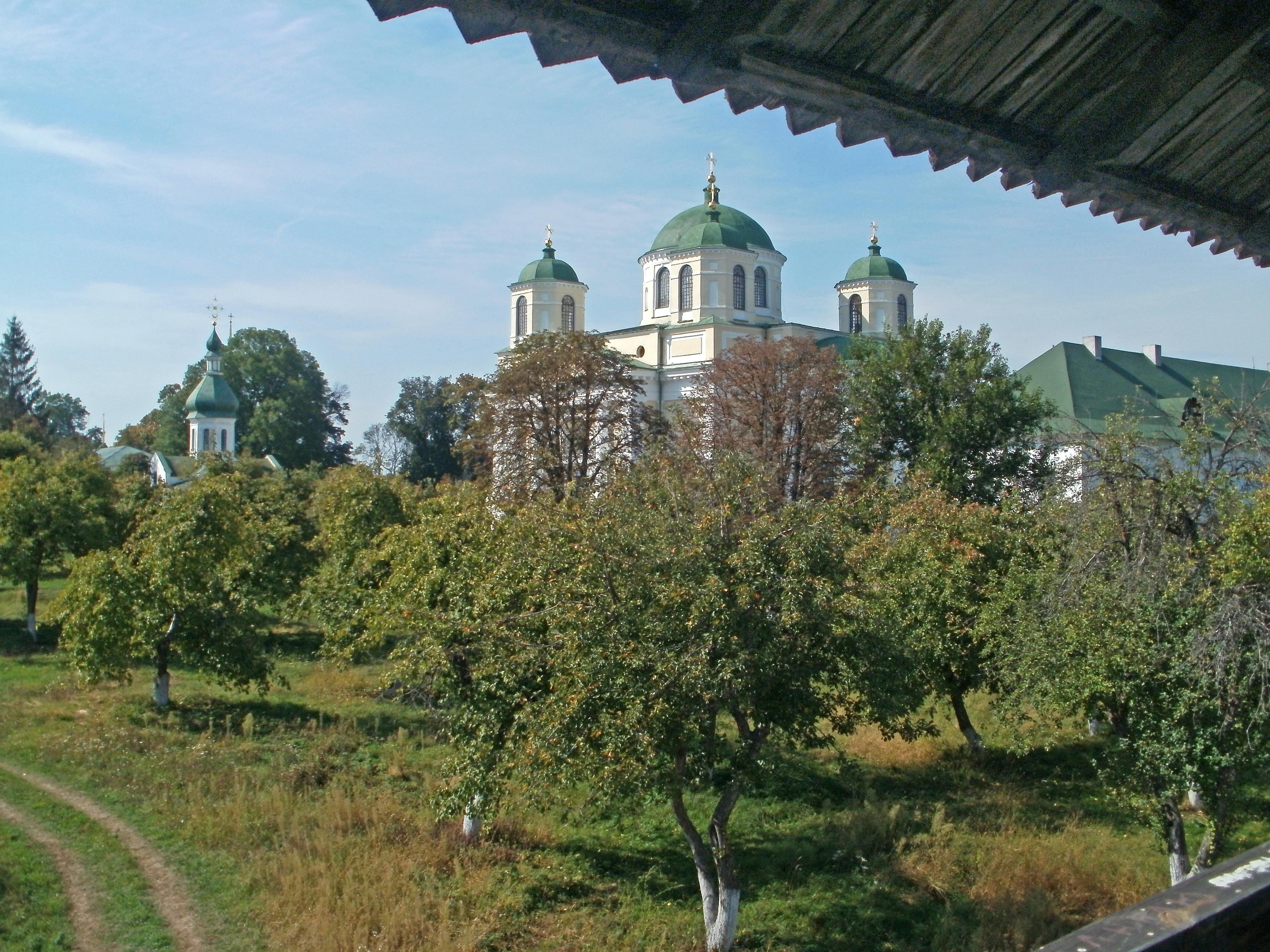
Savior-Transfiguration Monastery. View from the walls of the monastery.

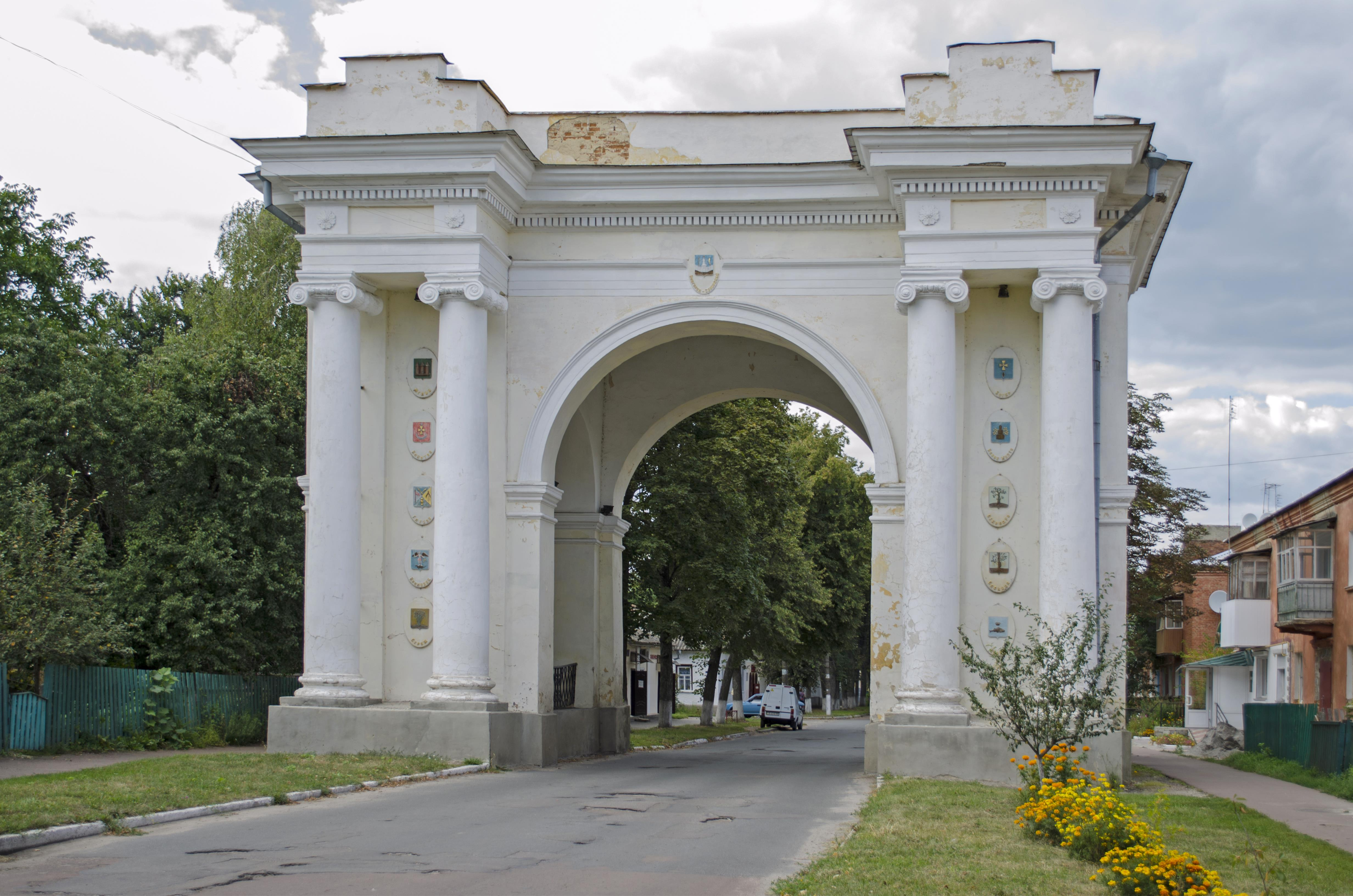
Triumphal Arch

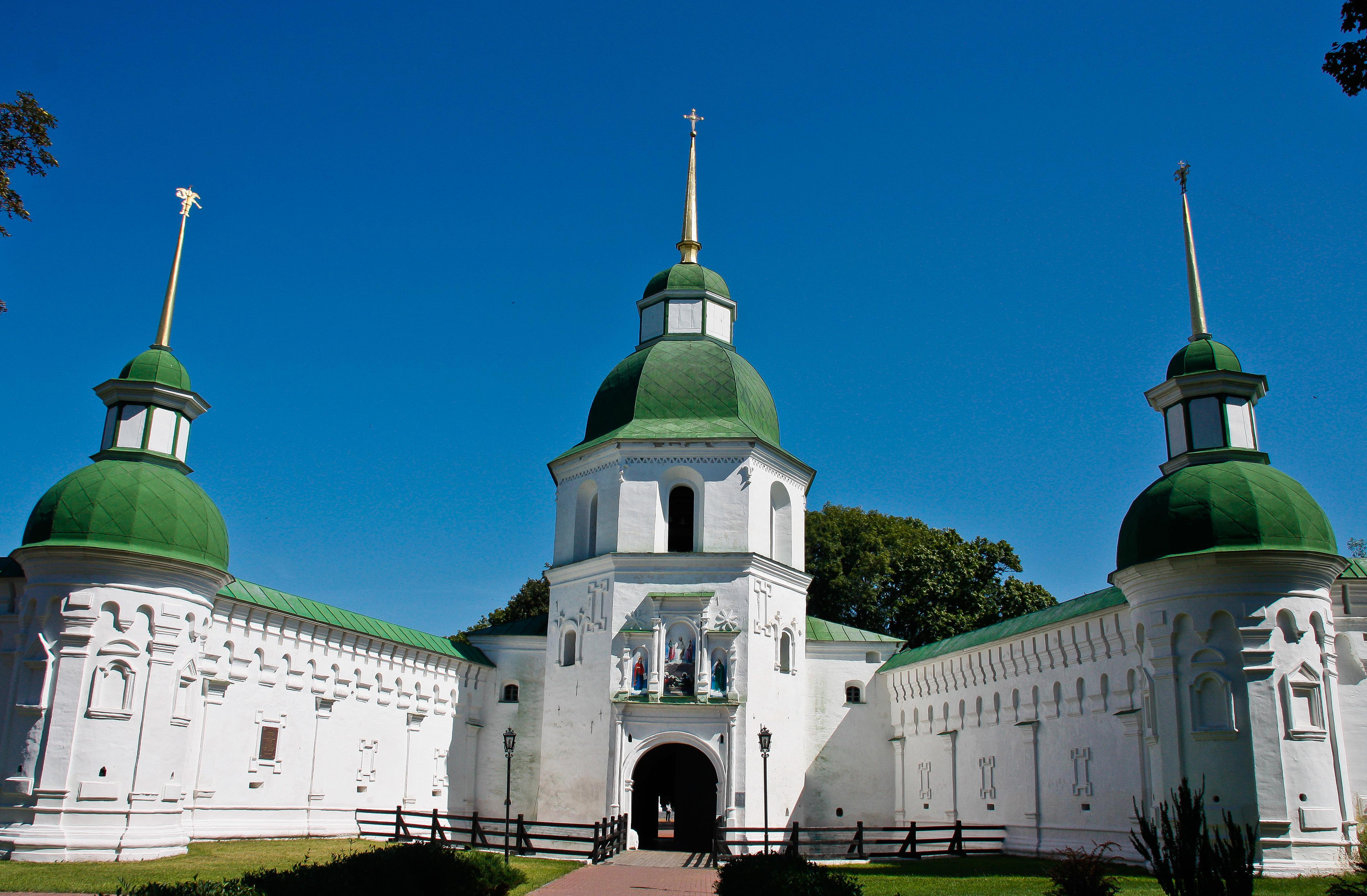
Savior-Transfiguration Monastery

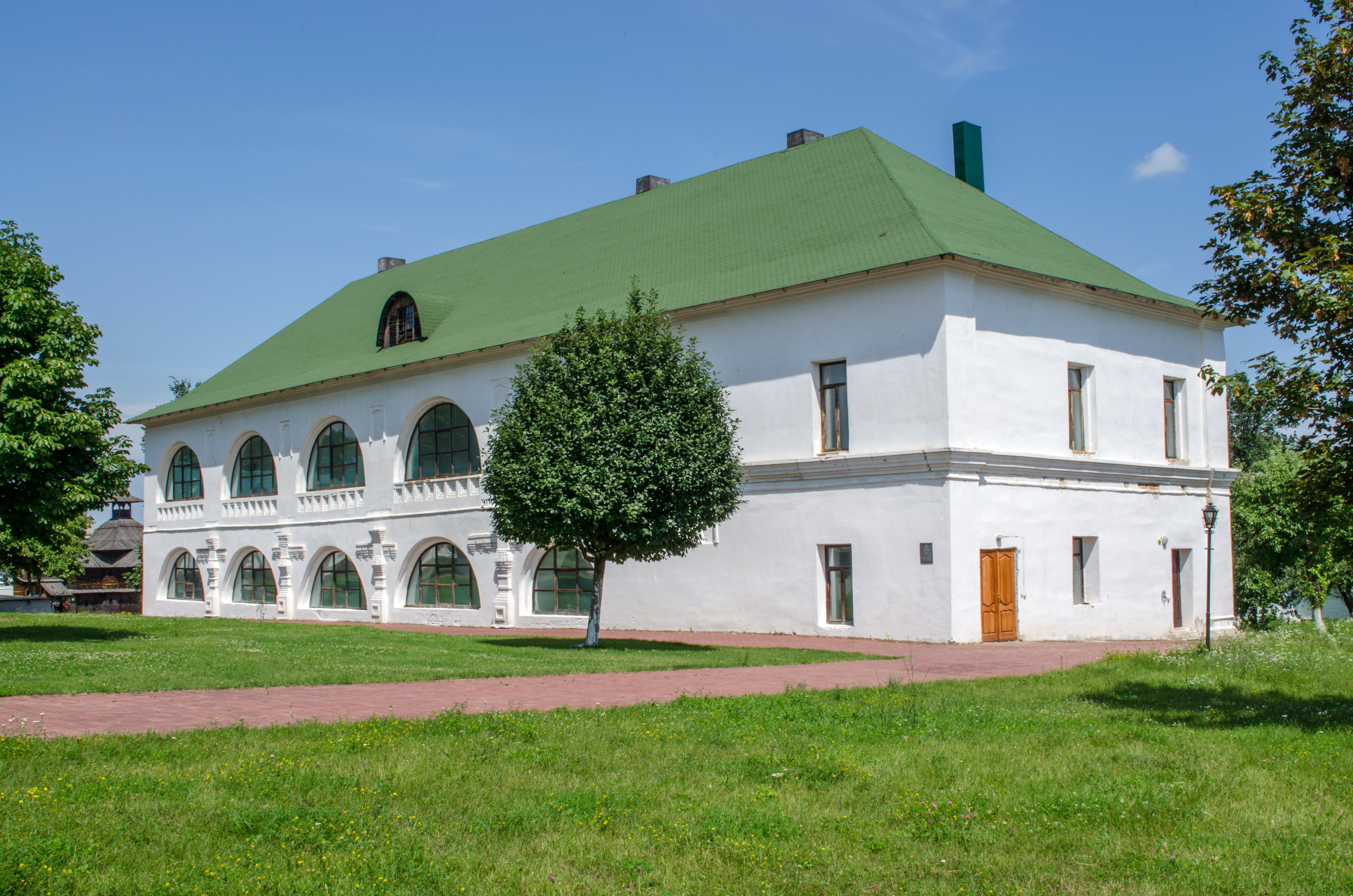
House of seminary

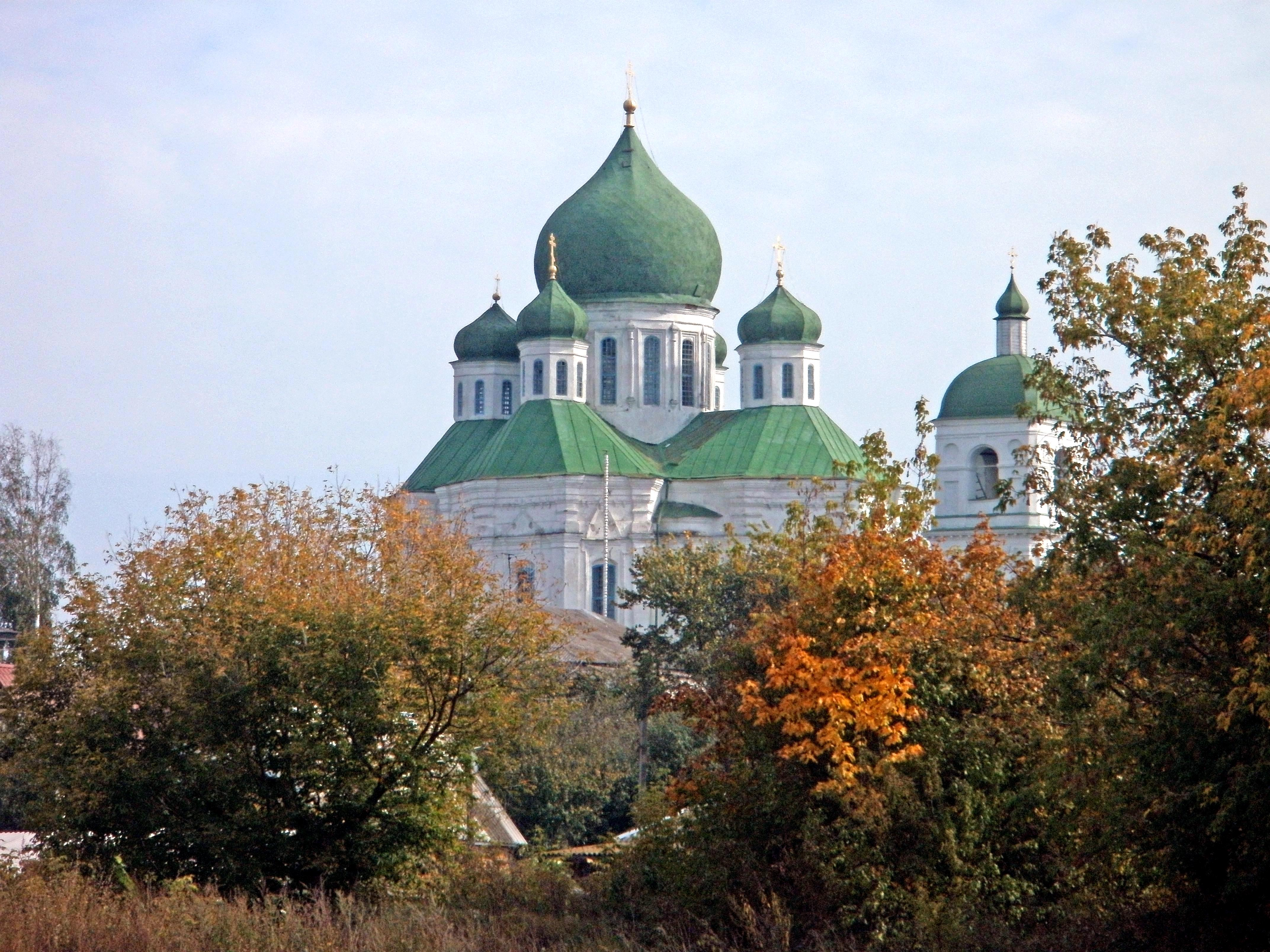
Cathedral of the Assumption

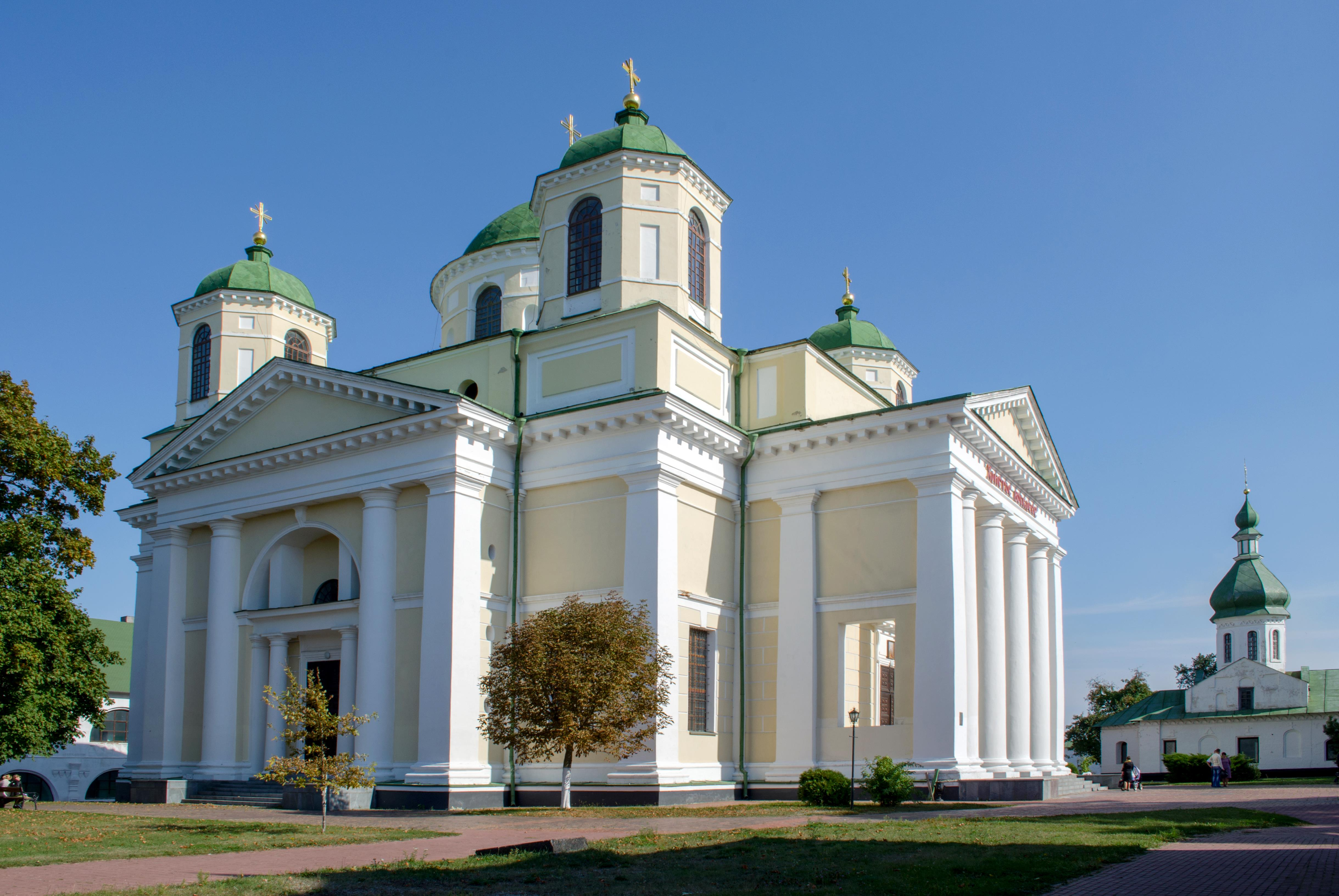
Savior-Transfiguration Cathedral

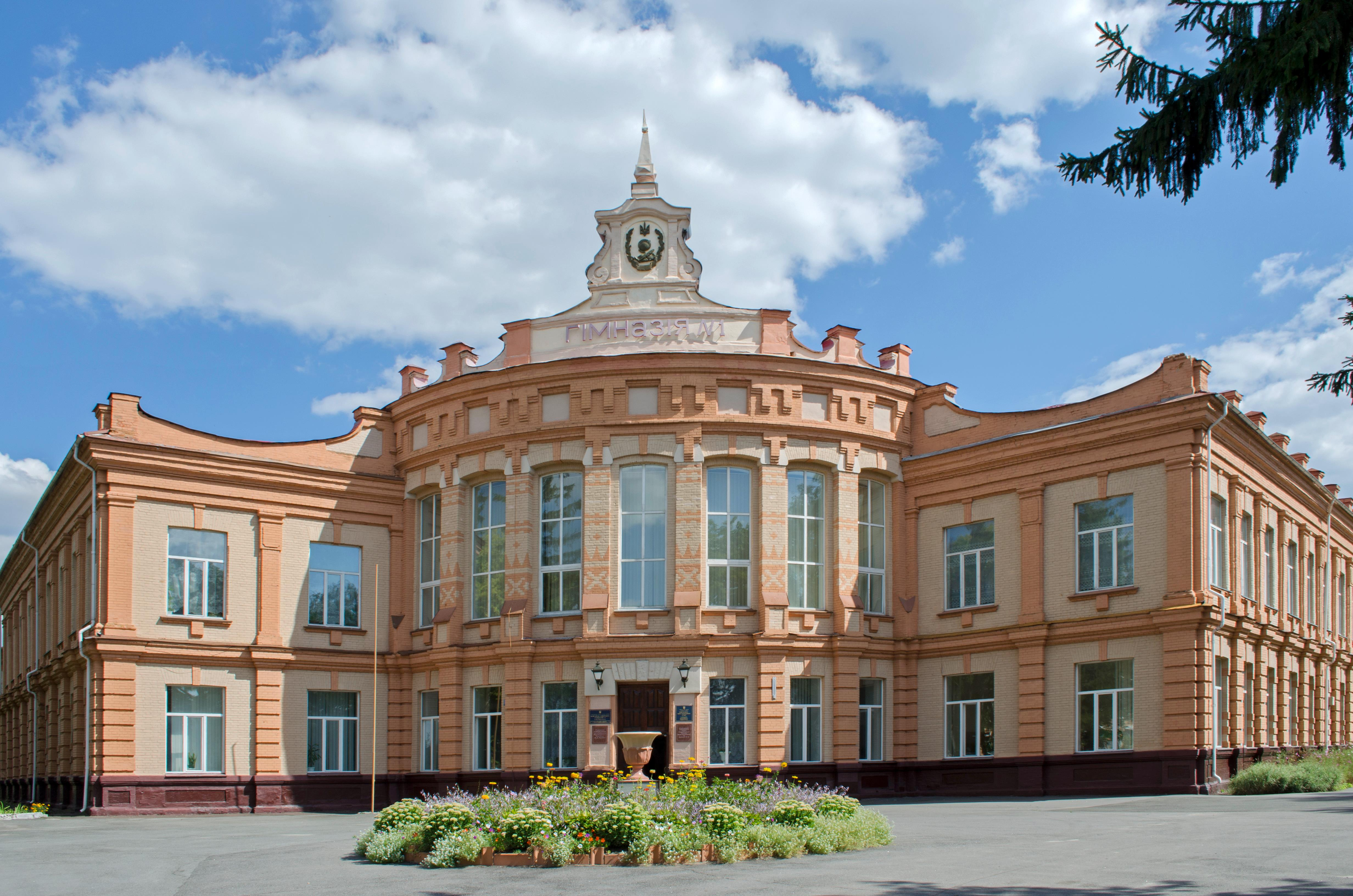
Women's gymnasium

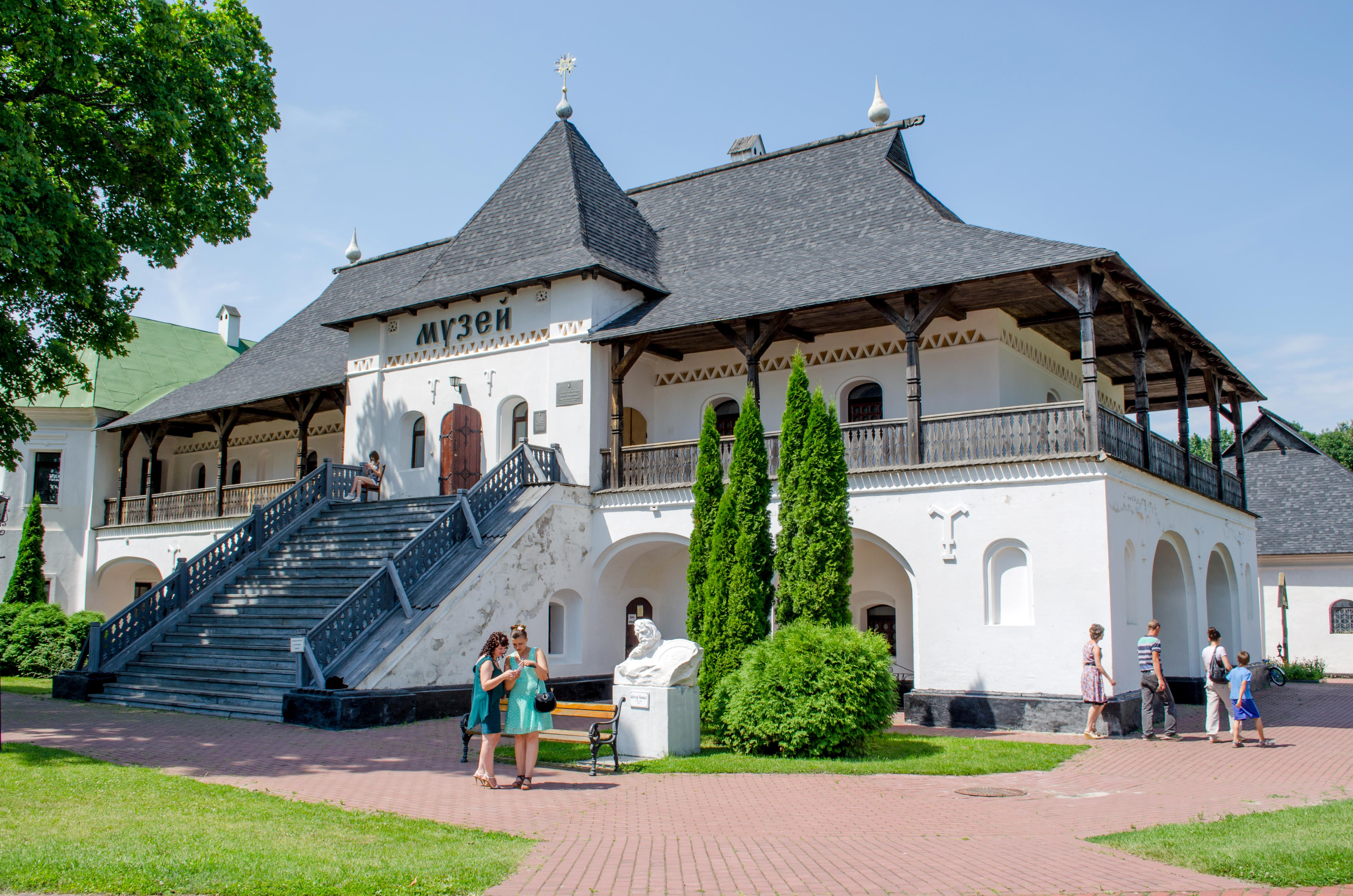
Local museum, a former abbot's residence

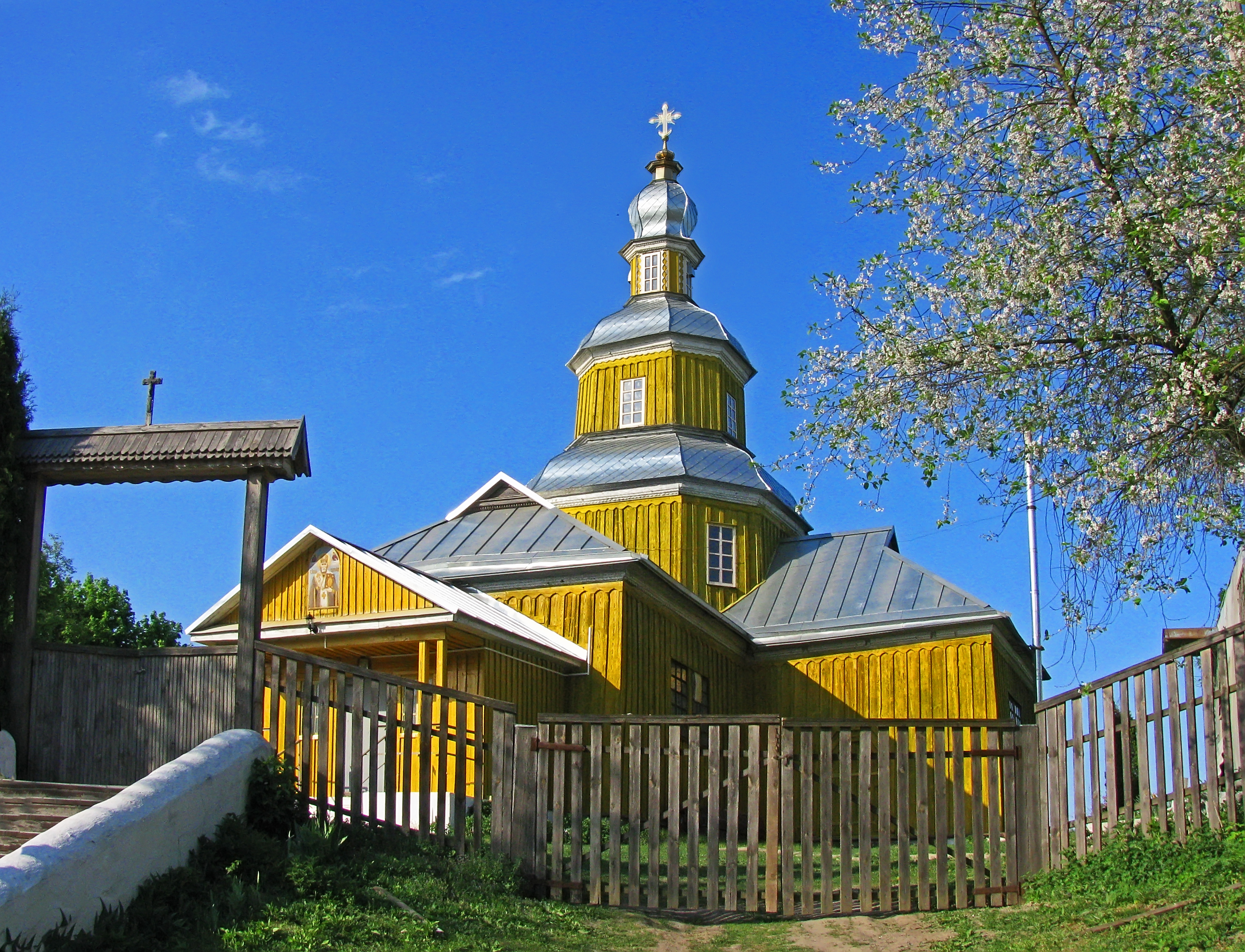
St. Nicholas Church

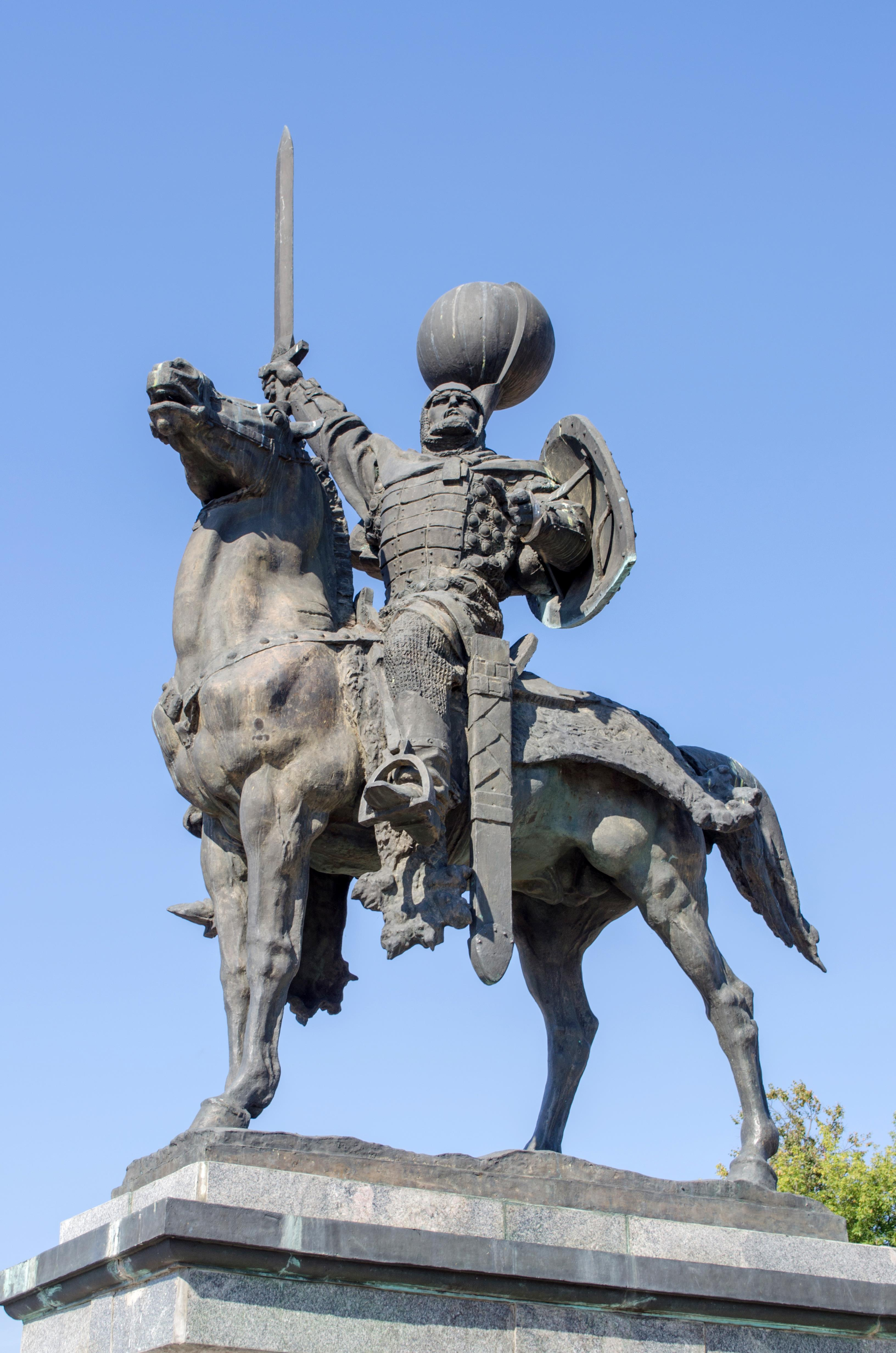
Monument to Prince Igor

== See also ==
- Siveria
