= Victor Solowij =

Ukrainian former archbishop

Archbishop Varlaam (Varlaam)
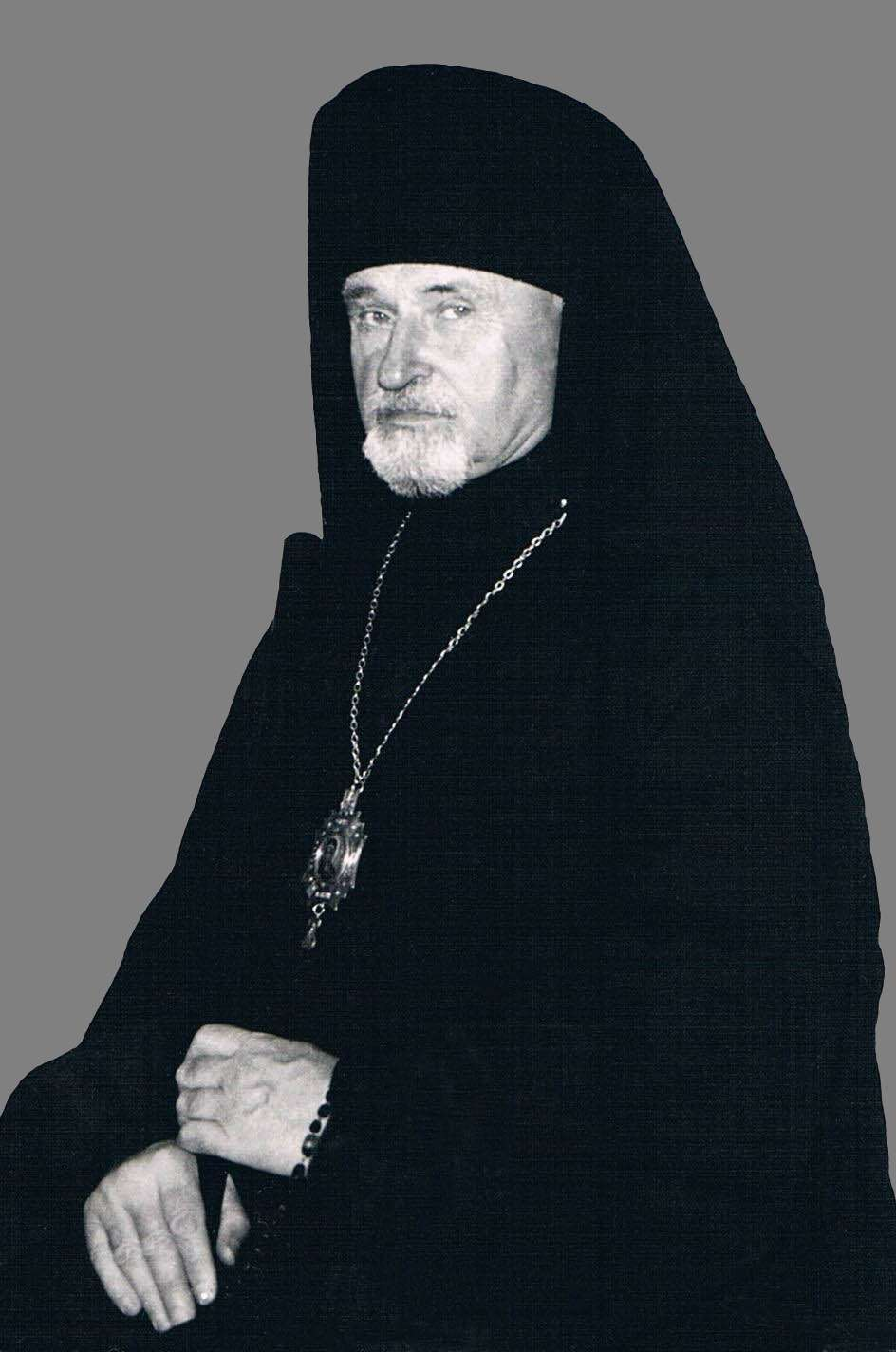

Personal details
- Born: Victor Sylvestrovych Solowij; 29 November 1891 Kyriivka, Chernigov Governorate, Russian Empire
- Died: 31 January 1966 (aged 74)
- Buried: Rookwood Cemetery, Sydney, Australia
- Denomination: Ukrainian Autocephalous Orthodox Church

Victor Sylvestrovych Solowij (29 November 1891 – 31 January 1966), later known as Archbishop Varlaam, was an archbishop of the Ukrainian Autocephalic Orthodox Church known for his public-political and church activism. He was born in the village of Kyriivka, in the Sosnycia District of Chernihiv Province, Ukraine.

== Early life ==
He attended Novhorod-Siversky religious school and the Chernihiv Seminary before obtaining a law degree from Warsaw University in 1914.

From 1914 to 1915 he worked as a court applicant in Moscow. He was then drafted and served as an artillery officer in the Russian Czarist Army. In 1917 he became the leader-chairman of the Ukrainian Military Community in Moscow and a local court judge in Chernihiv, Ukraine.

In 1918 during the period of the Ukrainian People's Republic (UNR), Solowij was a secretary of the Highest Court of independent Ukraine, later in 1919 in the war of independence he served as captain of an artillery corps of Sichovi Strilci and a commander of an artillery battery of the UHA (Ukrainian Galician Army). In 1920 Solowij was in charge of the legal department in the Headquarters of Ukraine's Supreme Commander and President, Symon Petliura and became his legal adviser in exile in Poland.

== Career ==
=== Ukraine ===
During 1923-1939 he was involved in church, community and co-operative activities in Volynia and Polissia in Western Ukraine. He was a member of the Metropolitan Council of the Ukrainian Orthodox Church in Poland. In the 1930s he was deported from Ukraine (Polissia) for his pro-Ukrainian activities and worked in the Polish courts, and simultaneously worked as a correspondent of the Ukrainian Learned Institute in Warsaw in the areas of ecclesiastic law and the soviet legislation.

Part of the Second World War the Solowij family lived in the Western Ukrainian regions of Pidlashshia and Kholmshchyna, where Solowij worked in the Polish courts and acted as the legal adviser of Metropolitan Ilarion (Ohijenko) and as a lecturer in the Kholm Religious Seminary (1939–1944).

In 1947-1950 Solowij was the general state secretary of the Ukrainian Government (UPR) in exile and the director of the justice ministry of the Executive Organ of the Ukrainian National Council.

=== Australia ===
After emigrating he involved himself in the organisation of the Ukrainian Community and in church activity. In 1951-1952 he was elected the inaugural chairman of the Ukrainian Association in Australia (now the Australian Federation of Ukrainian Organizations in Australia). He also became a member of the higher church administration of the Ukrainian Autocephalic Orthodox Church in Australia and New Zealand. In 1953 he was elected as a candidate for a Bishop of the Church and was ordained into the priesthood in 1954. In 1958 he was consecrated in Chicago by Metropolitan Ioan Teodorovych and Archbishop Mstyslav Skrypnyk (later the first Patriarch Mstyslav of the Ukrainian Orthodox Church). With the ecclesiastic name of Varlaam he was appointed as the titular Bishop of Chernihiv and became the governing bishop of the Metropolitan Diocese of the Church in Australia and New Zealand, residing in Melbourne from 1959. In 1965 Bishop Varlaam, elevated to the office of Archbishop, headed a united Church in Australia and New Zealand.

== Family ==
In 1930 Solowij married Valentyna Tanashevych and they had two sons – Bohdan, born in 1931 and Jaroslaw, born in 1936.

Valentyna, at an age of 37 years, died during the Second World War in Warsaw in 1944 and Solowij never remarried and remained a widower.

Solowij and sons spent 1944 in Germany. He became terminally ill his last years of life. He resided in the family home of his son Jaroslaw and wife Luba (née Welychko) who looked after him until his death. He died at home on 31 January 1966 and was buried in the Ukrainian Orthodox Section of the Independent Cemetery at Rookwood in Sydney.
