= Gigantolith =

Gigantolith of the Qaraoun culture. found at Mtaileb I. Double ended pick, triangular section with narrowing, jagged edges at both ends. Light grey and streaky silicious limestone

A gigantolith is a large stone or flint tool of the Heavy Neolithic industry, associated primarily with the Qaraoun culture in the Beqaa Valley, Lebanon, dating to the Epipaleolithic or early Pre-Pottery Neolithic at the end of the Stone Age. James Mellaart suggested that gigantoliths dated to a period before the Pottery Neolithic at Byblos (10,600 to 6900 BCE according to the ASPRO chronology) and noted "Aceramic cultures have not yet been found in excavations but they must have existed here as it is clear from Ras Shamra and from the fact that the Pre-Pottery B complex of Palestine originated in this area, just as the following Pottery Neolithic cultures can be traced back to the Lebanon."
