= Khutyn Monastery =

Coordinates: 58°35′14″N 31°23′42″E

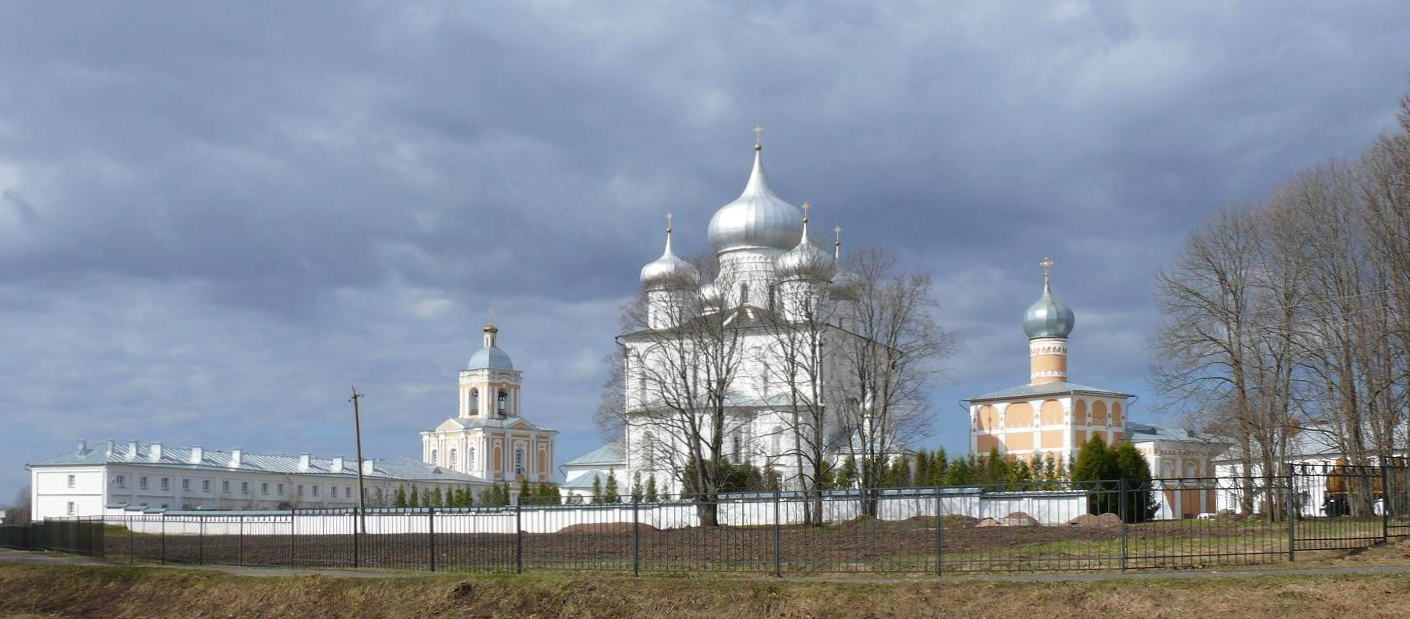
View of the monastery.

Khutyn Monastery of Saviour's Transfiguration and of St. Varlaam (Russian: Хутынский Спасо-Преображенский Варлаамиев монастырь) is an Orthodox monastery situated on the right bank of the Volkhov River some 10 kilometres (6.2 mi) north northeast of Novgorod, in the village of Khutyn. It used to be one of the main Christian shrines of the medieval Novgorod Republic.

== Background ==
The cloister was founded in 1192 by the monastery's first hegumen, the former Novgorodian boyar Oleksa Mikhailovich, whose monastic name was Varlaam. The main church of the monastery was consecrated by Archbishop Gavril of Novgorod the following year, the same year Varlaam died. He is buried in the main church of the monastery, the Church of the Transfiguration, to the right of the altar. He was the patron saint of Novgorod and the patrilineal ancestor of many families of Russian nobility, including Chelyadnins and Pushkins, of which Alexander Pushkin was a member.

According to Varlaam's vita, Ivan III visited the cloister and wished to see the relics of Saint Varlaam in 1471. When they opened the saint's tomb, it was full of smoke and fire. Afraid of inflicting divine wrath, Ivan III fled the monastery and Novgorod altogether, leaving his staff as a curiosity to local monks. This staff was exhibited at the cloister's sacristy for centuries to come.

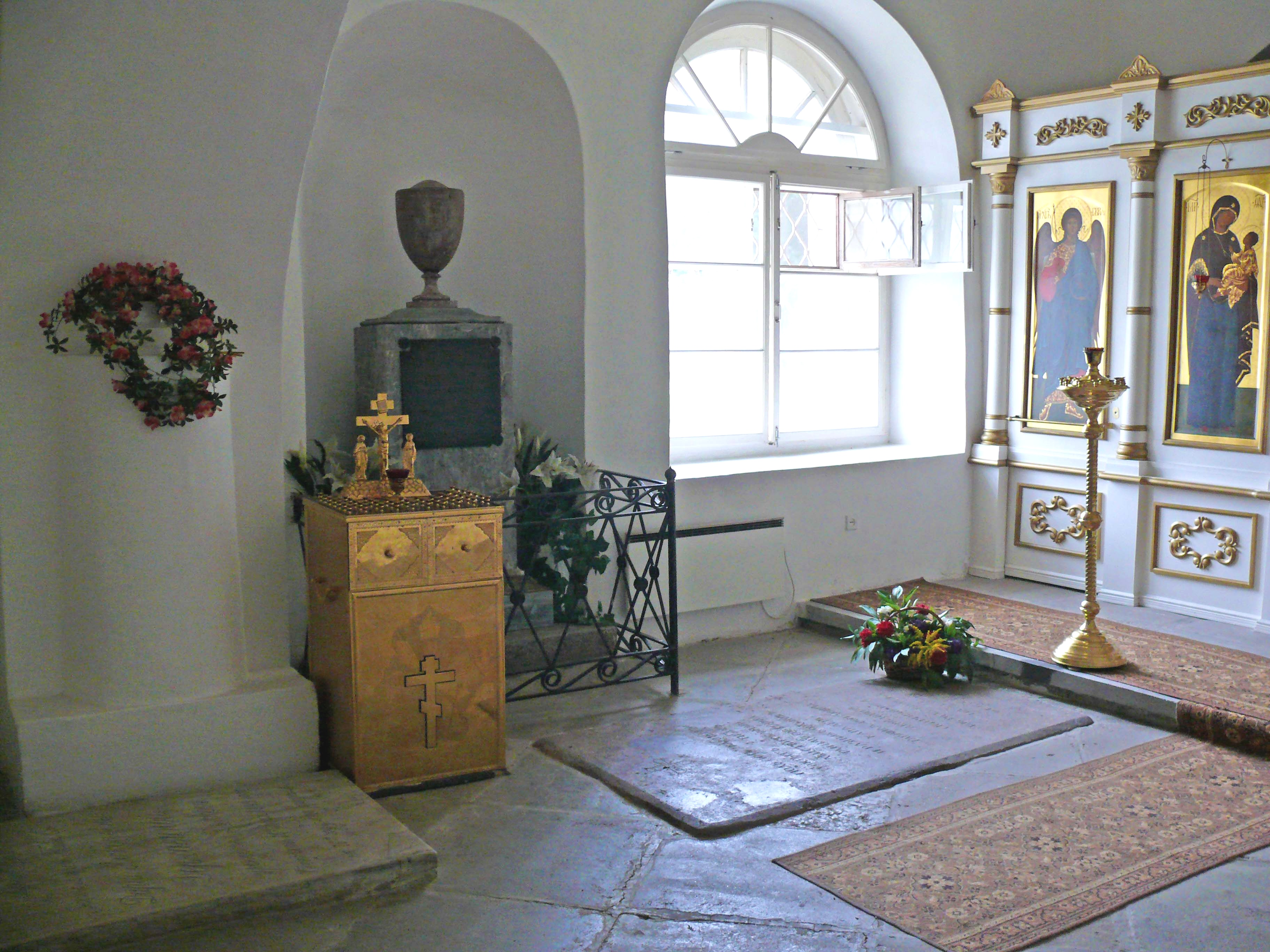
The grave of Gavrila Derzhavin

Ivan's son Vasily III ordered the old main church of the monastery demolished and replaced with a noble six-pillared edifice. The new church, completed by 1515 and consecrated by Metropolitan Varlaam (the archiepiscopal office in Novgorod was vacant from 1509-1526), was evidently patterned after the Assumption Cathedral in Rostov. It was the first piece of Muscovite architecture in the Russian North-West and a venerated model for many subsequent churches in the region.

The annex of St. Gabriel, added to the cathedral in 1646, received its present name after the poet Gavrila Derzhavin had been interred here in 1816. The refectory with St Varlaam Church was built at the behest of Ivan IV in 1552. The Neoclassical belltower dates from the reign of Catherine the Great.

The vicar of the Novgorodian diocese was, at times, titled Archbishop of Khutyn and lived in the Khutyn Monastery. For example, Archbishop Aleksei (Simansky) was Archbishop of Khutyn from 1926-1932. He administered the diocese while Metropolitan Arsenii was imprisoned and in exile in Central Asia. Aleksei was briefly Archbishop of Novgorod (in 1933) and then Patriarch of Moscow and All Rus' (1945-1970).

During the first decades of Soviet rule the monastery housed a lunatic asylum. It was later a vacation home or hostel for visitors to the area. It was restored to the church in 1993. While for most of its history it was a male monastery, it is currently a women's convent.

== See also ==
- 16th-century Western domes
