= Richard Balam =

English mathematician

Richard Balam (fl. 1653), was an English mathematician.

Balam was the author of Algebra, or the Doctrine of composing, inferring, and resolving an Equation (1653). It is a possible source of developments in John Wallis, Mathesis Universalis (1657), relating to geometric progressions treated as an axiomatic theory.
