= Balham (disambiguation) =

Balham is a district of London, England.

Balham may also refer to:

- Balaam, a Biblical figure
- Balham, Ardennes, a commune in France
- Balham station, a railway and tube station in Balham, London
- Balham (ward), an electoral division in Balham, London
