= Varlam Gelovani =

Georgian lawyer and politician

Prince Varlam Gelovani
- ვარლამ გელოვანი
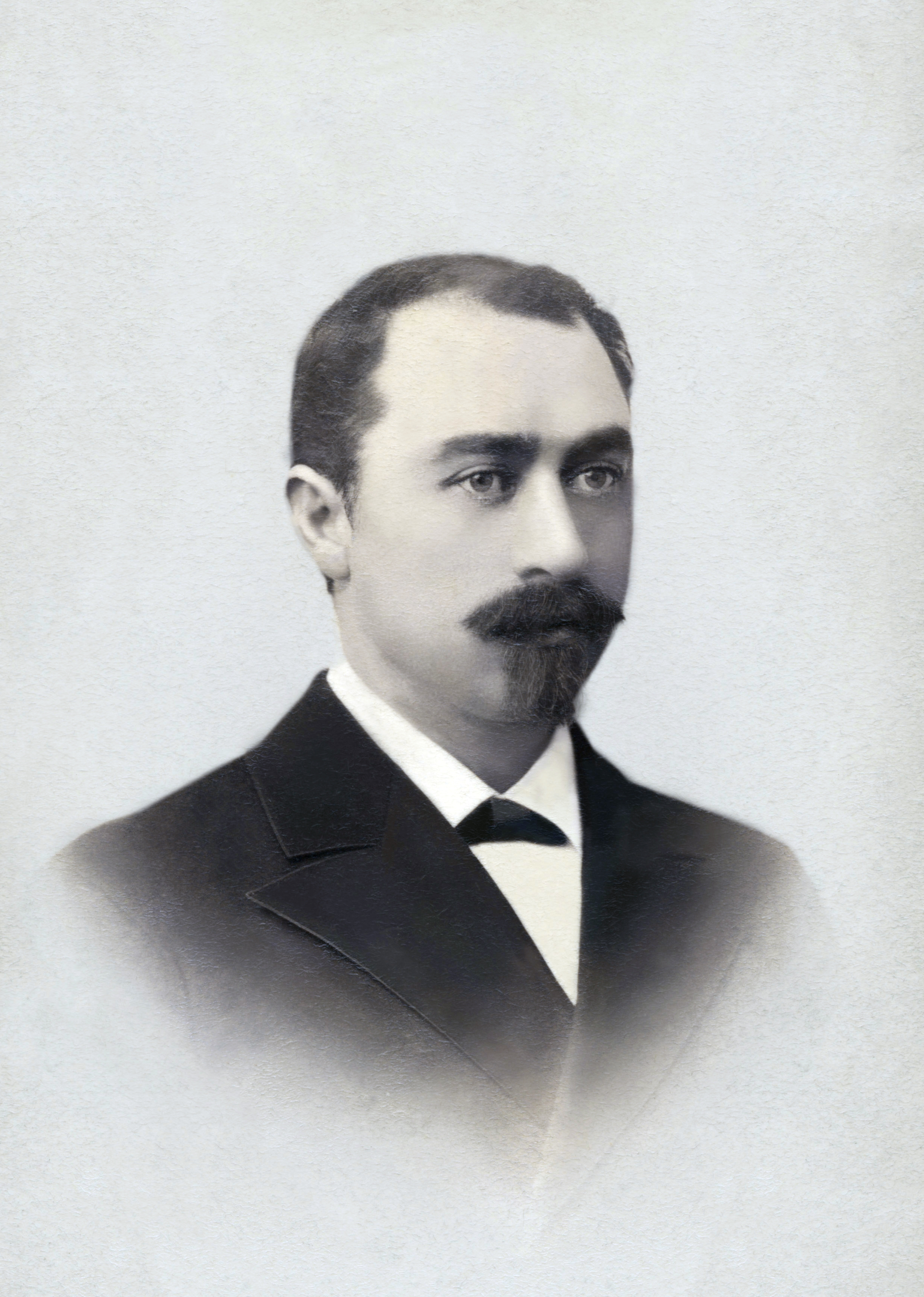
- Varlam Gelovani in 1906
- Born: April 14, 1878
- Died: February 22, 1915
- Education: Petersburg University
- Occupation(s): Lawyer, politician

Prince Varlam Gelovani (Georgian: ვარლამ გელოვანი; Russian: Варла́м Лева́нович Гелова́ни) (April 14, 1878 – February 22, 1915) was a Georgian lawyer and politician in the Russian Empire.

Born of the noble house of Gelovani, he graduated from the Petersburg University in 1901 and briefly practiced law in St. Petersburg. He later joined the Georgian Social Federalist Party and was elected, in 1905, to the Russian Fourth Duma for the Kutais Governorate (western Georgia). Varlam Gelovani was a close friend of Alexander Kerensky, who would become Prime Minister of Russia in February–October 1917. Prince Gelovani was an excellent chess player and became President of the St Petersburg's Chess Club. During World War I, Gelovani led a Red Cross detachment of the Duma members to the Caucasus front where he died of typhus. The obituary in the literary magazine Zvezda (the Star) was written by Kerensky.
