= Barlaam Shyshatsky =

Monk Barlaam (Russian: Монах Варлаам; secular name Gregory Stepanovich Shyshatsky, 12 March 1750, village Krasilovka, Kozeletskyy uezd, Chernigov province - 23 July 1820, Novgorod-Seversky) was a defrocked Archbishop of Mogilev and Vitebsk of the Russian Orthodox Church.

During the French invasion of Russia he was accused of taking a loyalty oath to Napoleon, forcing junior clergymen to do the same, celebrating Napoleon's birthday and saying prayers for Napoleon instead of the tsar's family. After a long trial by the Most Holy Synod, Varlaam was found guilty, stripped of the rank and confined to a monastery.

== Life ==
Varlaam was born in Chernihiv Guberniya in the Malorossian family and studied first in the Pereiaslav Seminary, then in the Kiev Church Academy. As the best alumnus of the academy he was sent to Italy, but due to military activities there returned to Kiev. In 1787 Varlaam was sent to Poland to manage the Vilno Monastery of the Holy Spirit.

During the French invasion to the Russian Empire the Russian officials escaped, but clergymen stayed. On 25 July 1812, the Marshal of France Louis-Nicolas Davout ordered Archbishop Varlaam to induce the population to swear an allegiance oath to Napoleon. Varlaam had served a public service in the cathedral, which mentioned "the great-power sovereign, French Emperor and Italian King, the great Napoleon and his wife, the Empress and Queen Marie Louise". The Mogilev clergy, as well as the Smolensk ones, were then accused of collaboration with the French. On May 1, 1813, Varlaam was deprived of his church ranks and sent to the Novgorod-Seversky Monastery of Transfiguration, where he died.
