= Barlaam of Khutyn =

Russian hermit and saint (d. 1192)

Saint Barlaam of Khutyn
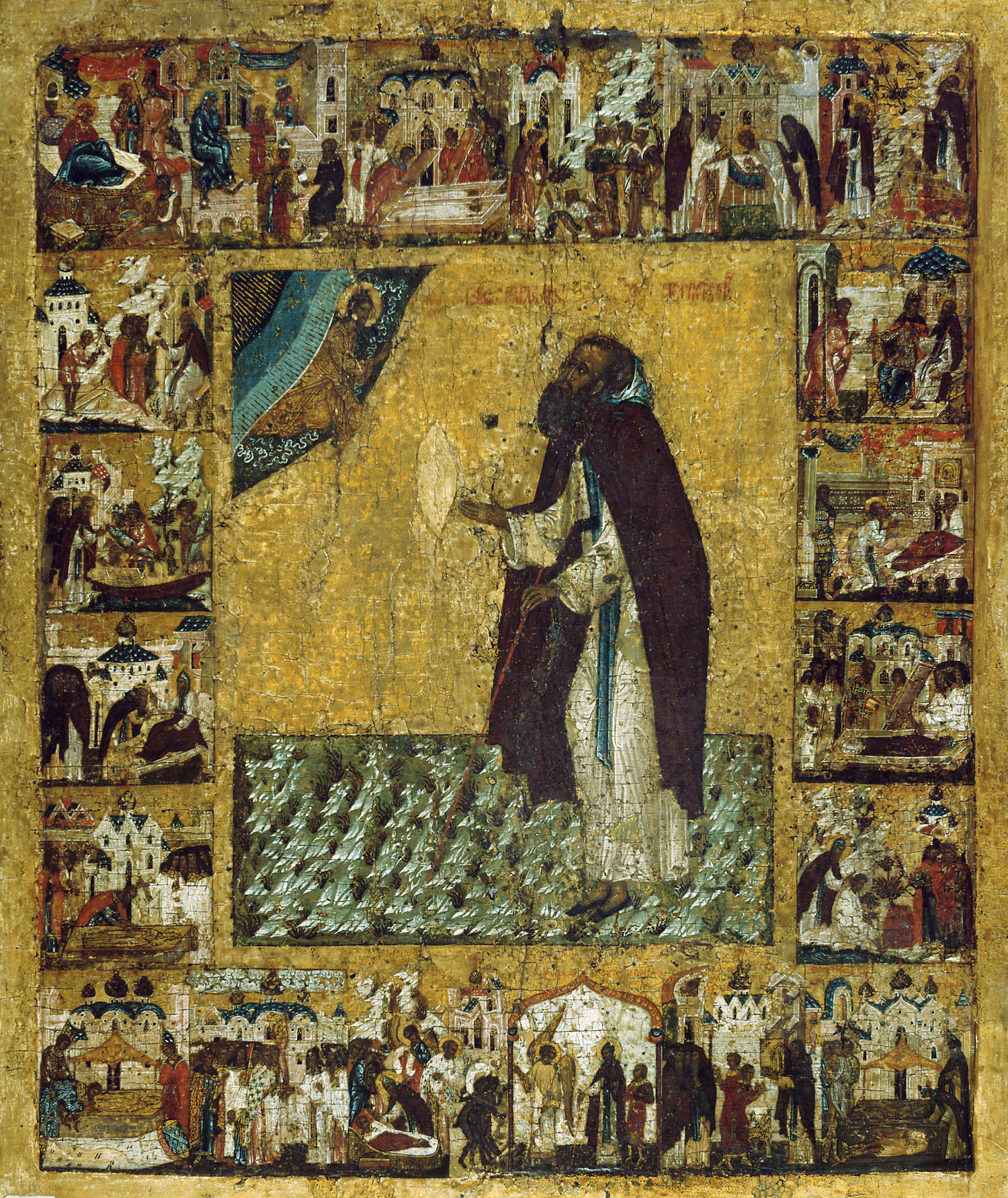
- Icon of Barlaam, 16th century

Venerable
- Born: c. 1112
- Died: November 8, 1192 (aged 79–80); Khutyn
- Venerated in: Eastern Orthodox Church Russian Greek Catholic Church
- Feast: 6 November

Barlaam or Varlaam of Khutyn (Russian: Варлаам Хутынский; secular name: Aleksa or Aleksy; (c. 1112 – 13 November [O.S. 6 November] 1192/1193) was a Russian Orthodox hegumen and saint who founded the Khutyn Monastery.

== Life ==
He was born into a wealthy family from Novgorod. After the death of his parents, he became a hermit on the Volkhov and handed all of his inheritance to the poor. He went to live in solitary at Khutyn, where he built a wooden chapel.

At this time, he had gained many followers as his reputation for holiness was spreading. So great were their numbers that he founded a monastery, the Khutyn Monastery, which was dedicated to Christ's transfiguration. He also took the name of Barlaam (Varlaam), and among the benefactors of the monastery was Yaroslav, the prince of Novgorod.

Barlaam died on 6 November 1192 or 1193, and his grave became a site for pilgrimage. Prior to his death, he had nominated a monk by the name of Antony to succeed him. Barlaam's relics were enshrined in 1452 and the Serbian monk Pachomius wrote about his life. He is commemorated in Russian liturgy when bread and wine is being prepared.

== Bibliography ==
- "Варлаам, преподобный хутынский" . Brockhaus and Efron Encyclopedic Dictionary (in Russian). 1906.
- Butler, Alban; Burns, Paul (1 January 1995). Butler's Lives of the Saints. A&C Black. pp. 47–48. ISBN 978-0-86012-260-9.
