= November 10 (Eastern Orthodox liturgics) =

Day in the Eastern Orthodox liturgical calendar

Eastern Orthodox liturgical calendar
November 9	November 10	November 11
November 10 O.S. ≍ November 23 N.S. November 10 N.S ≍ October 28 O.S.

An Eastern Orthodox cross

November 10 in Eastern Orthodox liturgical calendars is a feast day and a day of commemoration of saints and martyrs. Although some Orthodox churches use the Revised Julian Calendar and others use the traditional Julian calendar, the fixed commemorations for their respective November 10 are broadly the same, no matter which calendar is used. (Note: Despite the dates being the same, the days to which they refer typically differ by 13 days. The notation Old Style or O.S. is sometimes used to indicate a date in the traditional Julian Calendar (the "Old Calendar"). The notation New Style or N.S. indicates a date in the Revised Julian calendar (the "New Calendar").)

== Saints ==
- Apostles of the Seventy Disciples:

- Erastus of Paneas, Olympas, Herodion of Patras, Sosipater of Iconium, Quartus and Tertius (Terence) of Iconium (1st century)

- Hieromartyr Demetrianos of Antioch, Bishop of Antioch, martyred in Persia (256) (Note: "At Antioch, the Saints Demetrius, bishop, Anian, deacon, Eustosius, and twenty other martyrs.".)
- Martyr Orestes of Cappadocia (304) (Note: Name days celebrated today include: Orestes (Ὀρέστης).)
- Martyr Orion, by being buried alive
- Martyr Kalliopios, by the sword
- Martyr Niro, by the sword
- Hieromartyr Milos (Miles) the Wonderworker, Bishop in Persia, and his disciples, Martyrs Euores the Presbyter and Seboes the Deacon (c. 341) martyrs of Persia under Shapur II (see also: October 20)
- Venerable Martin the Bishop met his end in peace
- Saint Martin of Terracina, Bishop of Terracina (c. 4th century) (Note: He was a renowned Illyrian from Savaria in Pannonia, pious and virtuous. For defending Orthodoxy, the Arians publicly abused him and exiled him from the city. Therefore he fled to Milan, in Italy, but he suffered there as well, by the Arian bishop of that city, named Auxentius. He was then forced to retire to the island of Galerian in the Tyrrhenian Sea, which was entirely deserted. He sustained himself by eating the vegetation there. Later, he became the Bishop of Terracina, and excelled in his ecclesiastical duties. He nourished the poor, defended the aggrieved, and righteously pastored the flock entrusted to him. He reposed peacefully.) (see also: November 12)
- Venerable Nonnus, Bishop of Heliopolis, and the catechist of Saint Pelagia (471)
- Ten Martyrs of Gaza, at Jerusalem (638):

- Callinius, Imerius, Diasimus, Theodore, Stephen, Peter, Paul, Theodore, John, and John

- Venerable Theocteristus (Theosteriktos), Abbot of Symbola Monastery on Mount Olympus, Bithynia (8th century) (Note: He lived in the iconoclastic period and was a defender of the holy icons.) (see also: February 17)
- Great Martyr Constantine-Kakhi, grand prince of Kartli, Georgia (852)

== Pre-Schism Western saints ==
- Saint Probus I, the sixth Bishop of Ravenna (c. 175) (Note: "At Ravenna, St. Probus, a bishop, renowned for miracles." His relics are venerated in the Cathedral in Ravenna.)
- Saint Eucharius, first Bishop of Trier (3rd century)
- Saints Tiberius, Modestus and Florentia, martyrs under Diocletian at Agde in the south of France (303) (Note: "In the diocese of Agde, the holy martyrs Tiberius, Modestus, and Florentia, who, after being subjected to various torments, consummated their martyrdom in the time of Diocletian.")
- Saint Leo the Great, Pope of Rome, Confessor (461) (Note: Probably born in Tuscany in Italy, he became Bishop of Rome in 440. He fought against many heresies. His celebrated Tomos defined the Orthodox belief in the Two Natures and One Person of Christ. It was acclaimed as the teaching of the Orthodox Church at the Council of Chalcedon in 451. The most famous event of his life was his meeting with Attila outside the gates of Rome which resulted in the salvation of the city in 452.) (see also: February 18 - East)
- Saint Monitor, twelfth Bishop of Orleans in France, Confessor (c. 490)
- Saint Áed mac Bricc, a disciple of St Illadan at Rathlihen in Offaly in Ireland, Bishop (589) (Note: He founded churches at Rathugh and other places in his native Meath, where he was bishop.)
- Saint Elaeth the King, a Briton driven into Wales by the Picts, he became a monk with St Seiriol in Anglesey in Wales (6th century) (Note: Some of his poems still exist.)
- Saint Justus of Canterbury, the fourth Archbishop of Canterbury, Confessor (627–631) (Note: Born in Italy, he was sent by St Gregory the Great to England in 601. In 604 he became first Bishop of Rochester and in 624 succeeded St Mellitus as the fourth Archbishop of Canterbury.) (Note: "In England, St. Justus, bishop, who was sent by pope Gregory with Augustine, Mellitus, and others to preach the Gospel in that country. There he went to his repose in the Lord, celebrated for sanctity.")
- Saint Adelin of Séez (Adelheim), a monk and Abbot of Saint-Calais, then Bishop of Séez in France (c. 910)
- Saint Guerembaldus, a monk at Hirschau in Germany, who out of humility refused to become Bishop of Spire (965)

== Post-Schism Orthodox saints ==
- Venerable Arsenios the Cappadocian (1924) (Note: Name days celebrated today include: Arsenios, Arsenio (Ἀρσένιος); Arsenia (Ἀρσενία).) (see also: October 28 - O.S.)

=== New martyrs and confessors ===
- New Hieromartyr Niphon (Niphont) Vyblov, Hieromonk, of Berezovy Khutor, Saratov and New Martyr Alexander Medem (1931)
- New Hieromartyr Boris Semenov, Deacon (1931–1934)
- New Hieromartyrs Procopius Titov, Archbishop of Kherson, (Note: See: (in Russian) Прокопий (Титов). Википедии. (Russian Wikipedia).) Dionisius Shchegolev, Priest, John Skadovsky, Priest, (Note: See: (in Russian) Скадовский, Иван Георгиевич. Википедии. (Russian Wikipedia).) and Peter Pavlushkov, Archpriest, of Tula (1937)
- New Hieromartyrs Augustine Belyaev, Archbishop of Kaluga, (Note: See: (in Russian) Августин (Беляев). Википедии. (Russian Wikipedia).) and with him (1937):

- John Speransky, Archpriest, of Kaluga
- Ioannicius Dmitriev, Archimandrite, of the St. George Monastery, Meshchevsk (Note: See: (in Russian) Иоанникий (Дмитриев). Википедии. (Russian Wikipedia).)
- Seraphim Gushchin, Hieromonk of Optina Monastery

- New Martyrs Alexis (Alexei) Gorbachev, Apollonius Babichev, (Note: See: (in Russian) Бабичев, Аполлон Ксенофонтович. Википедии. (Russian Wikipedia).) and Michael Arefeyev (1937)
- New Martyr Nicholas Smirnov (1937)
- New Virgin-martyr Anna Ostroglazova (1937–1939)
- New Martyrs Olga Maslennikova (1941) and Theoctista Chentsova (1942)
- Venerable New Hieromartyr Visarion (Toia) of Lainici, Archimandrite, abbot of Lainici Monastery (1951) (Note: See: (in Romanian) Visarion Toia. Wikipedia. (Romanian Wikipedia).)

== Other commemorations ==
- Commemoration of the beginning of the torture of Great-martyr George upon the wheel (303)
- Founding of the Church of Saint George (1891)
- Translation of the relics (1935) of St. Gregory, Bishop of Assos near Ephesus (1150), to Lesvos (Note: His feast day is on March 4. The Translation of his Relics to Lesvos took place on November 16, 1935. Based on the proposal of the Metropolitan of Mytilene, the Ecumenical Patriarchate appointed the feast day for the 'Translation of the relics of Saint Gregory, Bishop of Assos (1150), to be celebrated each year on the 1st Sunday after November 10.) (On the Sunday between November 11–17 each year)
- Glorification of St. Matthew, monk, of Yaransk, Wonderworker (1997) (Note: His feast day is on May 16.)

== Icon gallery ==
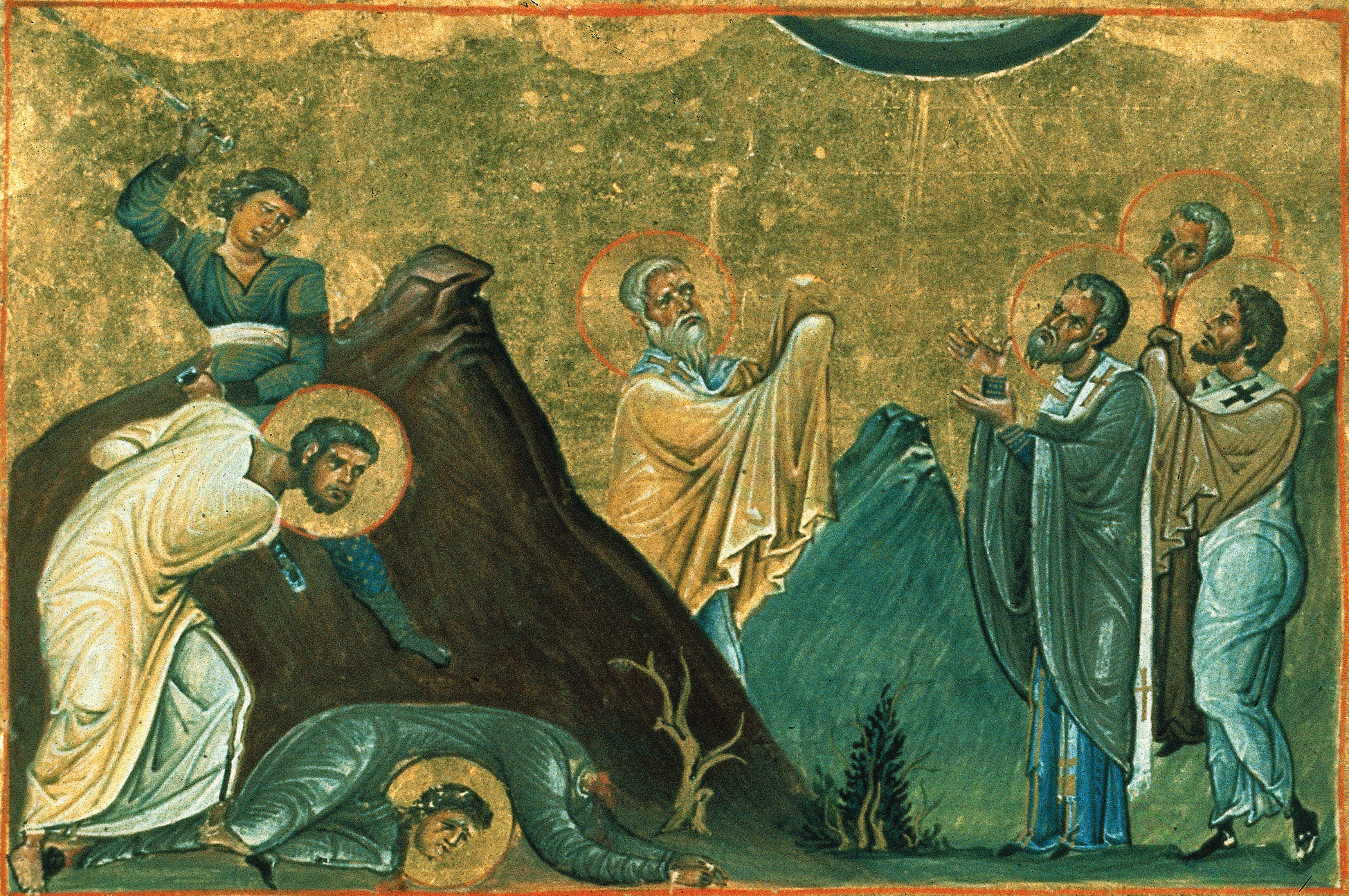
Apostles of the Seventy: Erastus, Olympas, Herodion, Sosipater, Quartus and Tertius.
(Menologion of Basil II, 10th century).

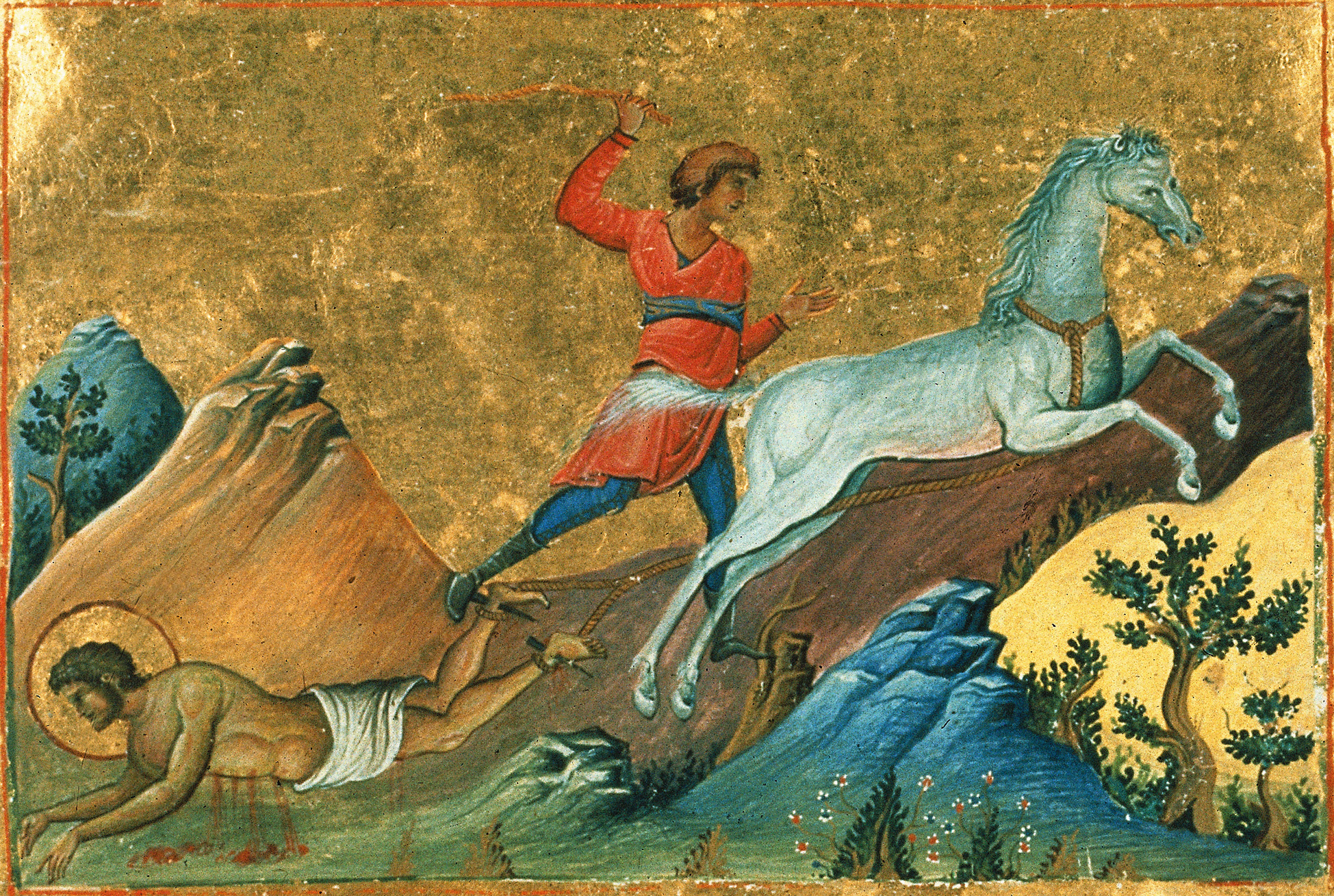
Martyr Orestes of Cappadocia, the Physician.
(Menologion of Basil II, 10th century).

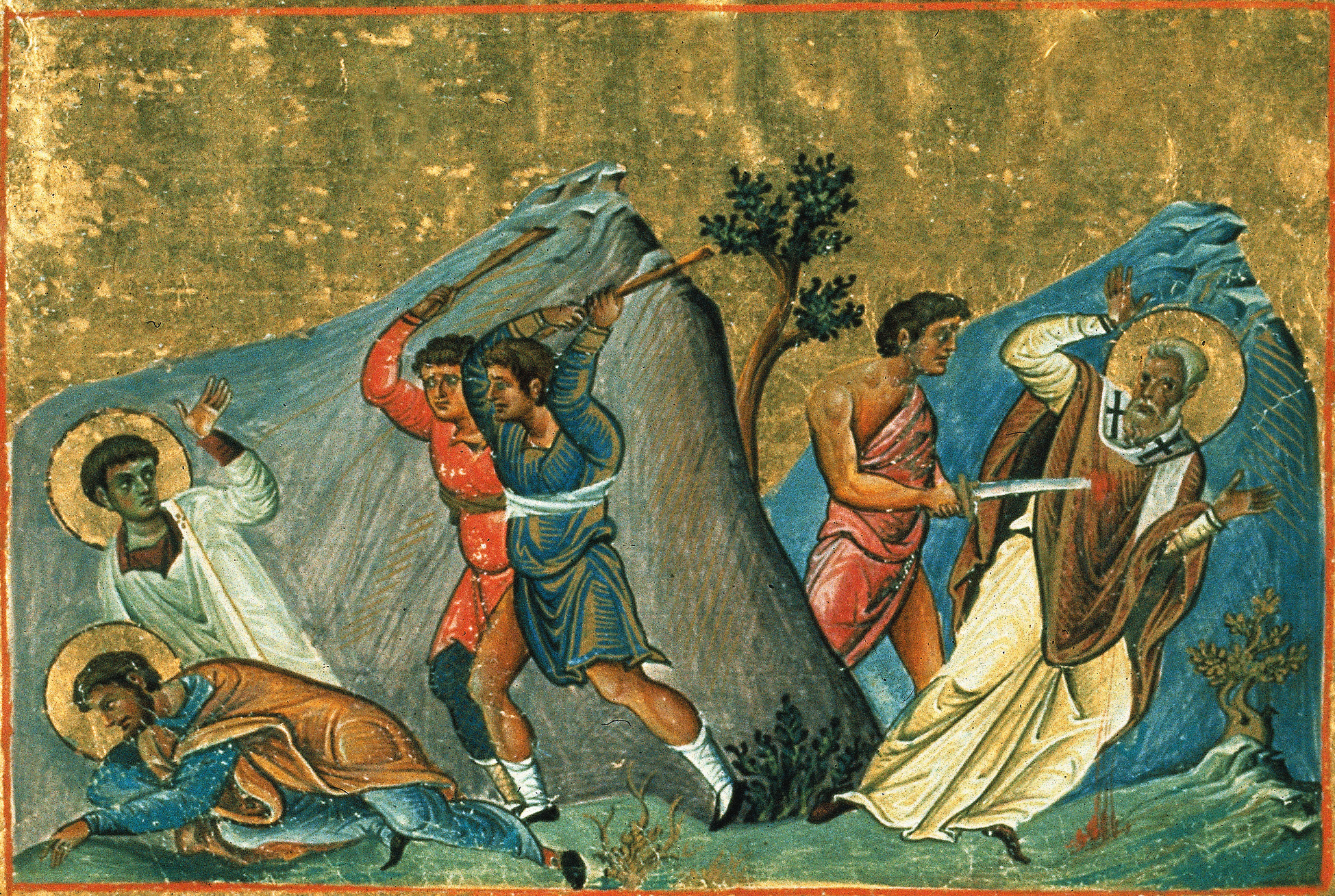
Hieromartyr Milos (Miles) the Wonderworker, Bishop in Persia, and his disciples, Euores the Presbyter and Seboes the Deacon.
(Menologion of Basil II, 10th century).

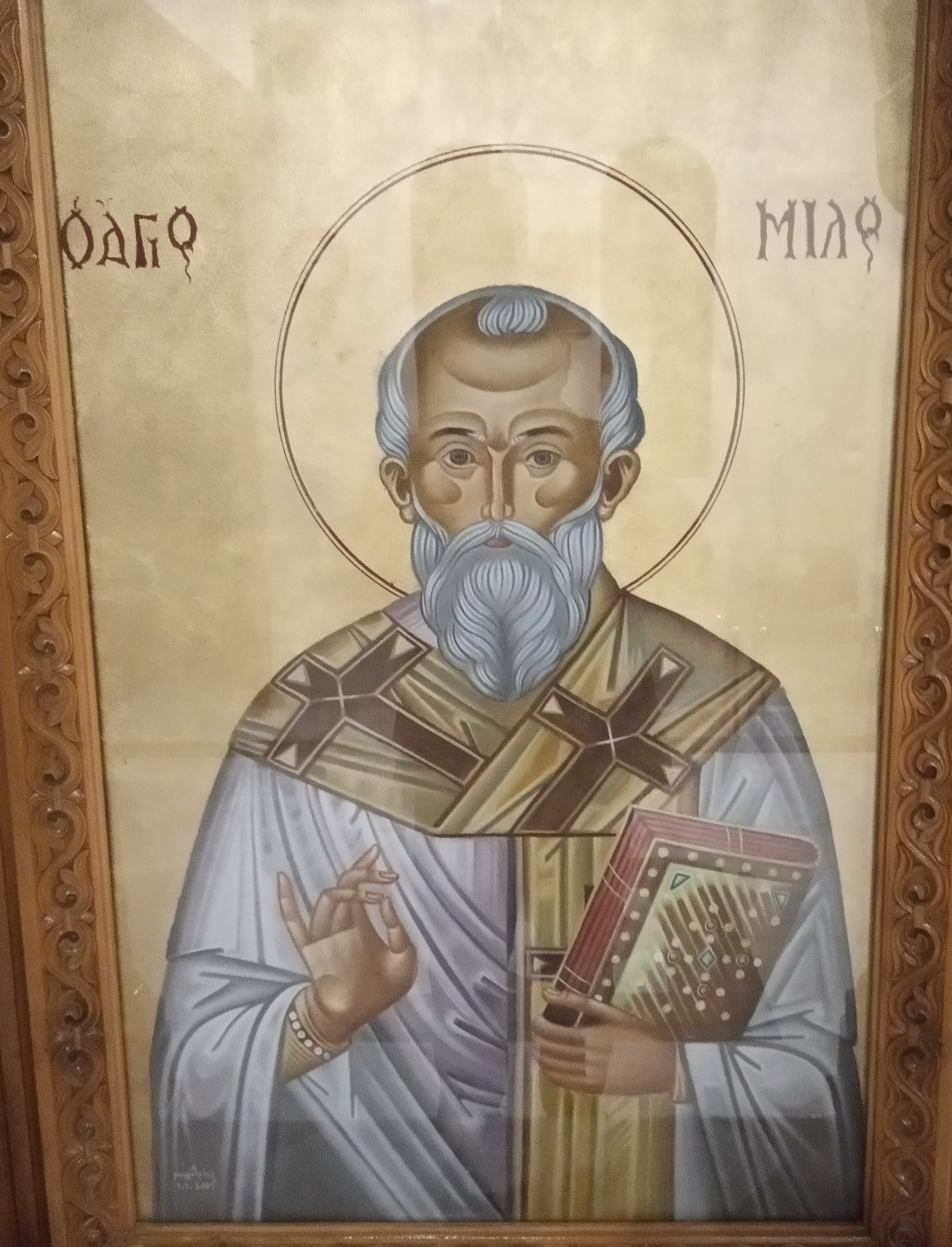
Hieromartyr Milos (Miles) the Wonderworker, Bishop in Persia.
(Church of St. Milos, Patras, Greece).

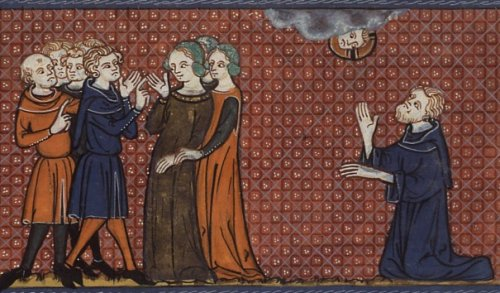
St. Nonnus prays for St Pelagia amongst her courtesans.

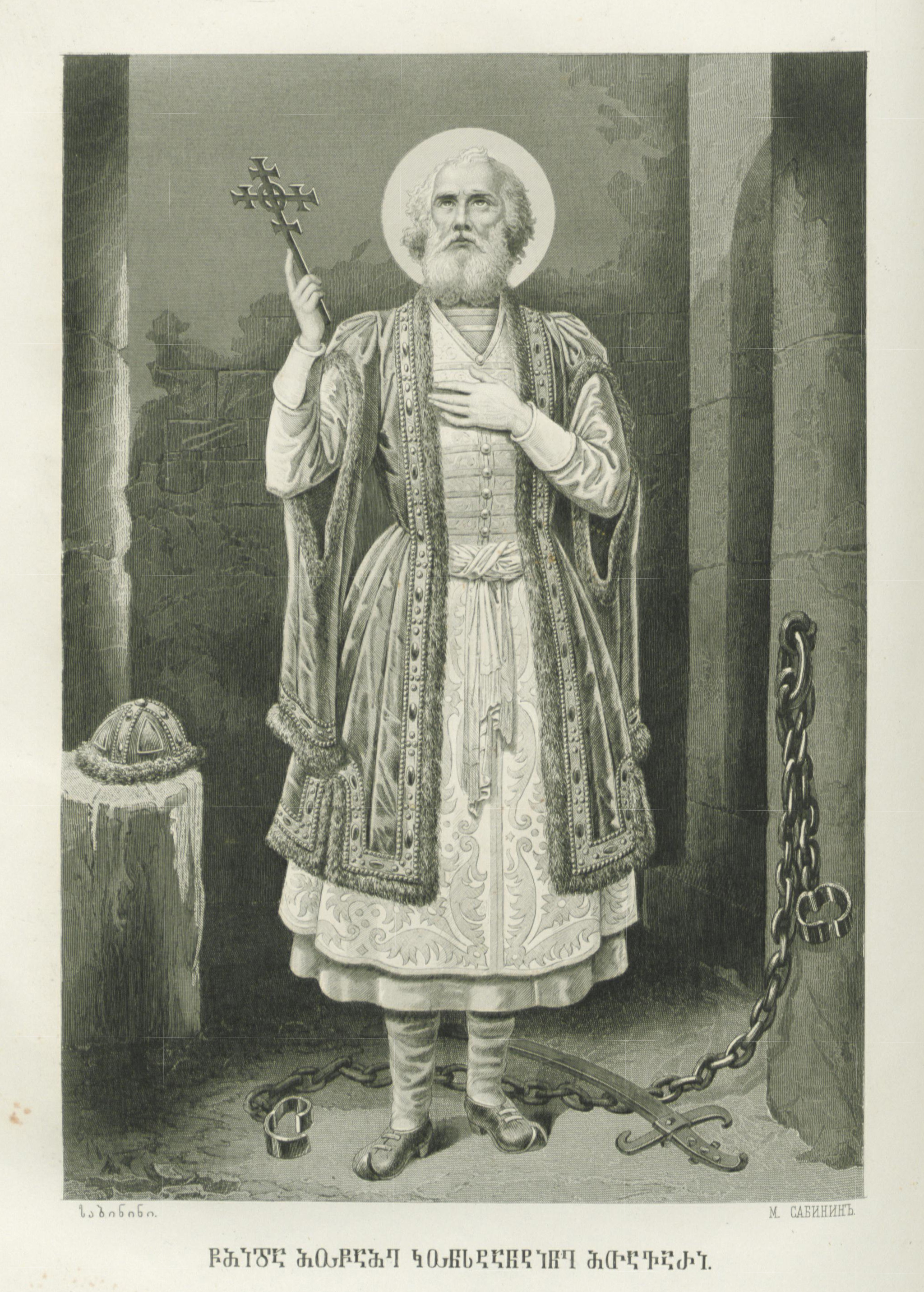
Great Martyr Constantine-Kakhi, Prince of Kartli, Georgia.

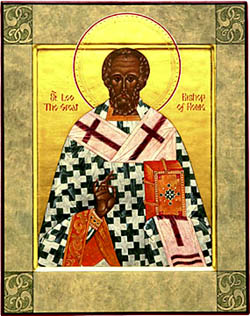
Saint Leo the Great, Pope of Rome.

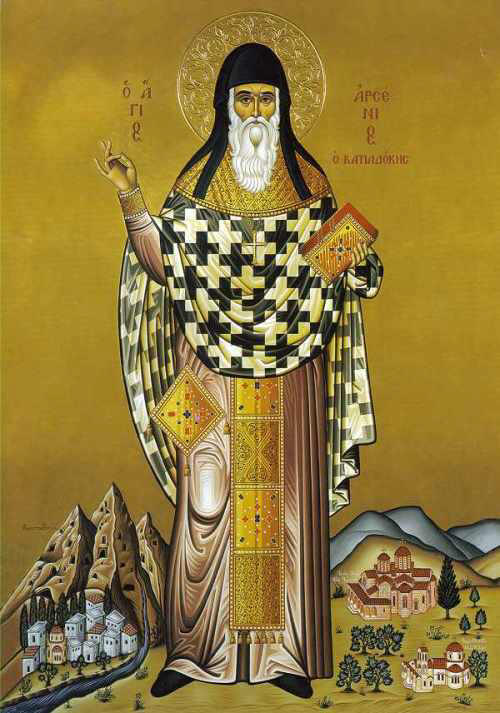
Venerable Arsenius of Cappadocia.

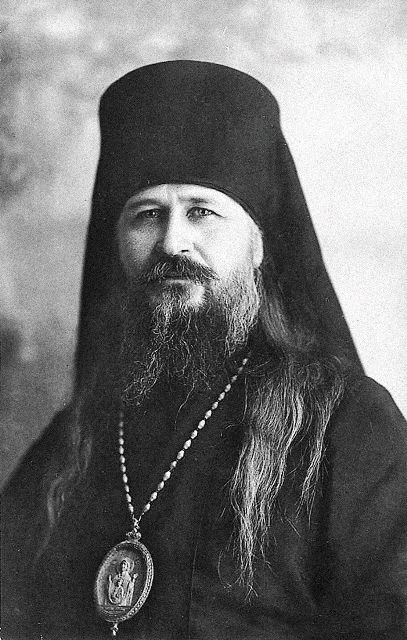
New Hieromartyr Procopius (Titov), Archbishop of Kherson.

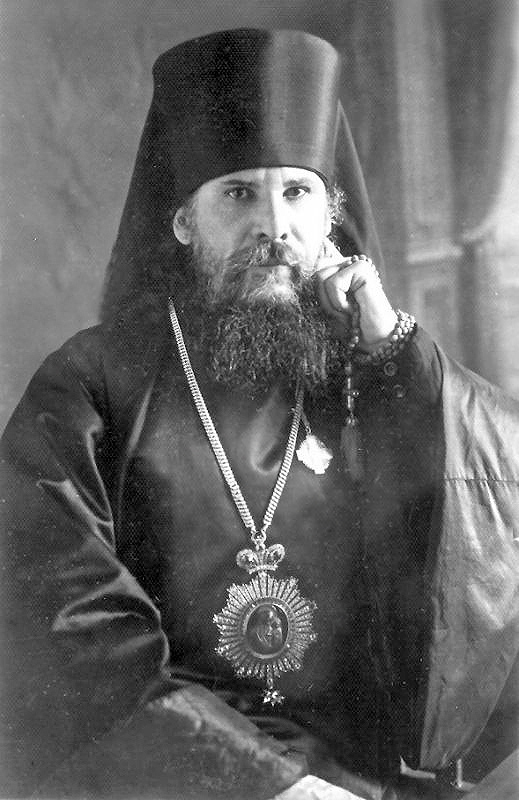
New Hieromartyr Augustine (Belyaev), Archbishop of Kaluga.

New Martyr Apollonius Babichev.

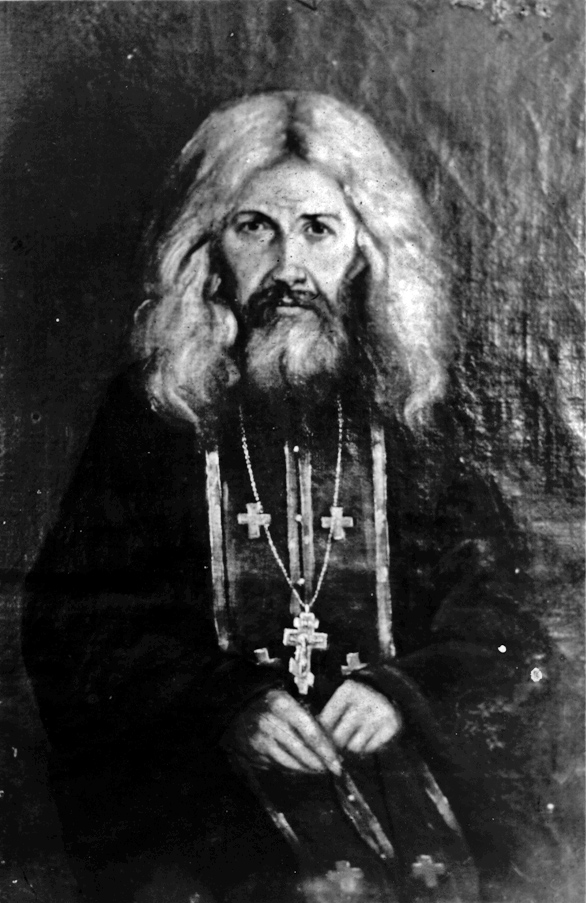
Venerable Hieromonk Matthew of Yaransk, the Wonderworker.

== Sources ==
- November 10/November 23. Orthodox Calendar (PRAVOSLAVIE.RU).
- November 23 / November 10. HOLY TRINITY RUSSIAN ORTHODOX CHURCH (A parish of the Patriarchate of Moscow).
- November 10. OCA - The Lives of the Saints.
- The Autonomous Orthodox Metropolia of Western Europe and the Americas (ROCOR). St. Hilarion Calendar of Saints for the year of our Lord 2004. St. Hilarion Press (Austin, TX). p. 84.
- The Tenth Day of the Month of November. Orthodoxy in China.
- November 10. Latin Saints of the Orthodox Patriarchate of Rome.
- The Roman Martyrology. Transl. by the Archbishop of Baltimore. Last Edition, According to the Copy Printed at Rome in 1914. Revised Edition, with the Imprimatur of His Eminence Cardinal Gibbons. Baltimore: John Murphy Company, 1916. pp. 346–347.
- Rev. Richard Stanton. A Menology of England and Wales, or, Brief Memorials of the Ancient British and English Saints Arranged According to the Calendar, Together with the Martyrs of the 16th and 17th Centuries. London: Burns & Oates, 1892. pp. 533–534.

Greek Sources

- Great Synaxaristes: (in Greek) 10 ΝΟΕΜΒΡΙΟΥ. ΜΕΓΑΣ ΣΥΝΑΞΑΡΙΣΤΗΣ.
- (in Greek) Συναξαριστής. 10 Νοεμβρίου. ECCLESIA.GR. (H ΕΚΚΛΗΣΙΑ ΤΗΣ ΕΛΛΑΔΟΣ).
- (in Greek) November 10. Ορθόδοξος Συναξαριστής.

Russian Sources

- (in Russian) 23 ноября (10 ноября). Православная Энциклопедия под редакцией Патриарха Московского и всея Руси Кирилла (электронная версия). (Orthodox Encyclopedia - Pravenc.ru).
- (in Russian) 10 ноября по старому стилю / 23 ноября по новому стилю. Русская Православная Церковь - Православный церковный календарь на 2016 год.
