= 1st century in Lebanon =

- Key event(s)
- Birth of Christianity, Year of the Four Emperors
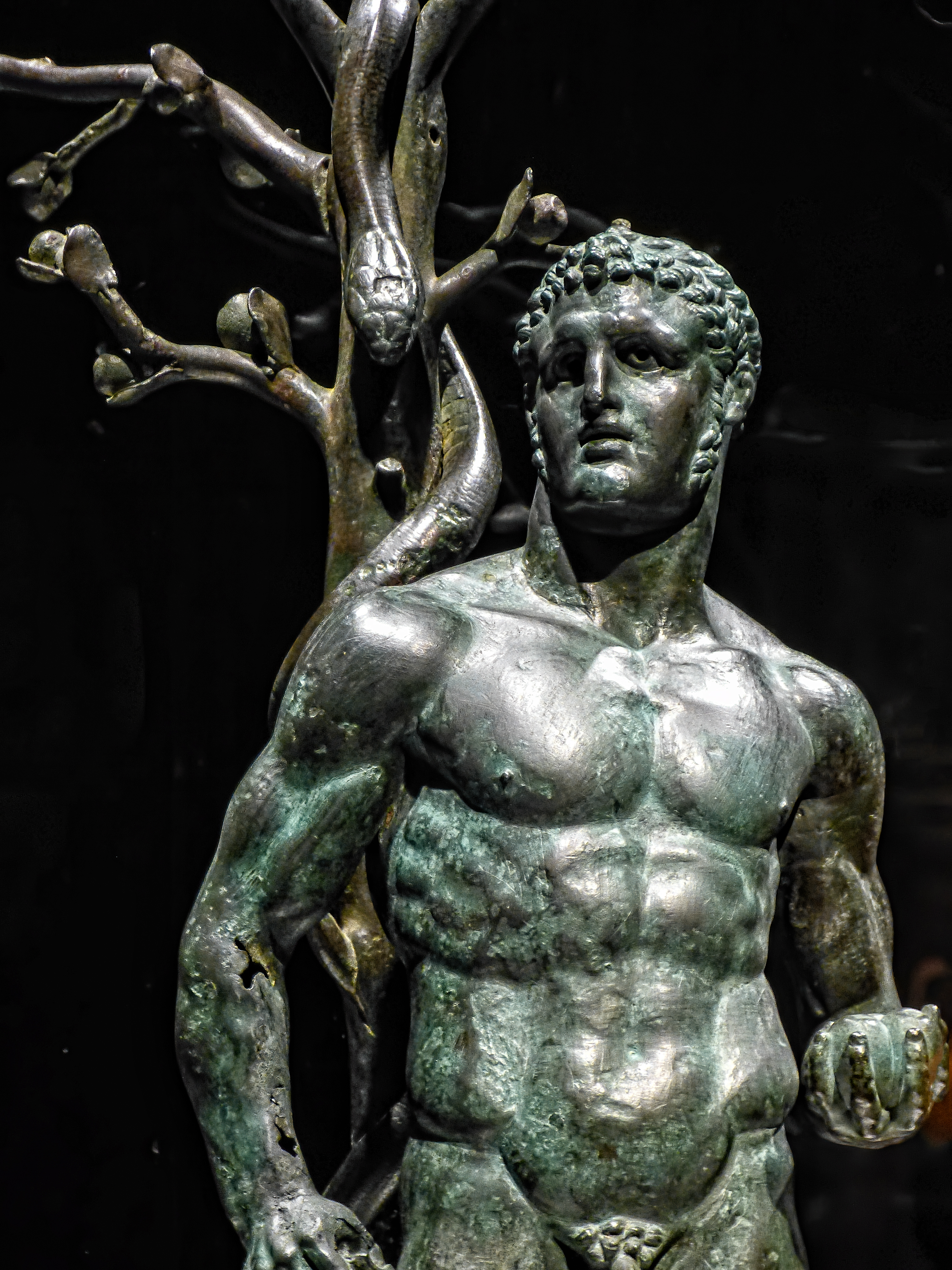
- Herakles with the Apples of the Hesperides, Roman statue dating back to the 1st century CE, from a temple at Byblos, Lebanon.
- Chronology
- ← 1st century BC; 1st century; 2nd century →

This article lists historical events that occurred between 1–100 in modern-day Lebanon or regarding its people.

== Administration ==
=== Kingdom at the Beqaa ===
The Itureans dwelt in the region of Mount Lebanon according to an inscription from 6–12 AD, in which Quintus Aemilius Secundus relates that he was sent by Quirinius against the Itureans in Mount Lebanon.

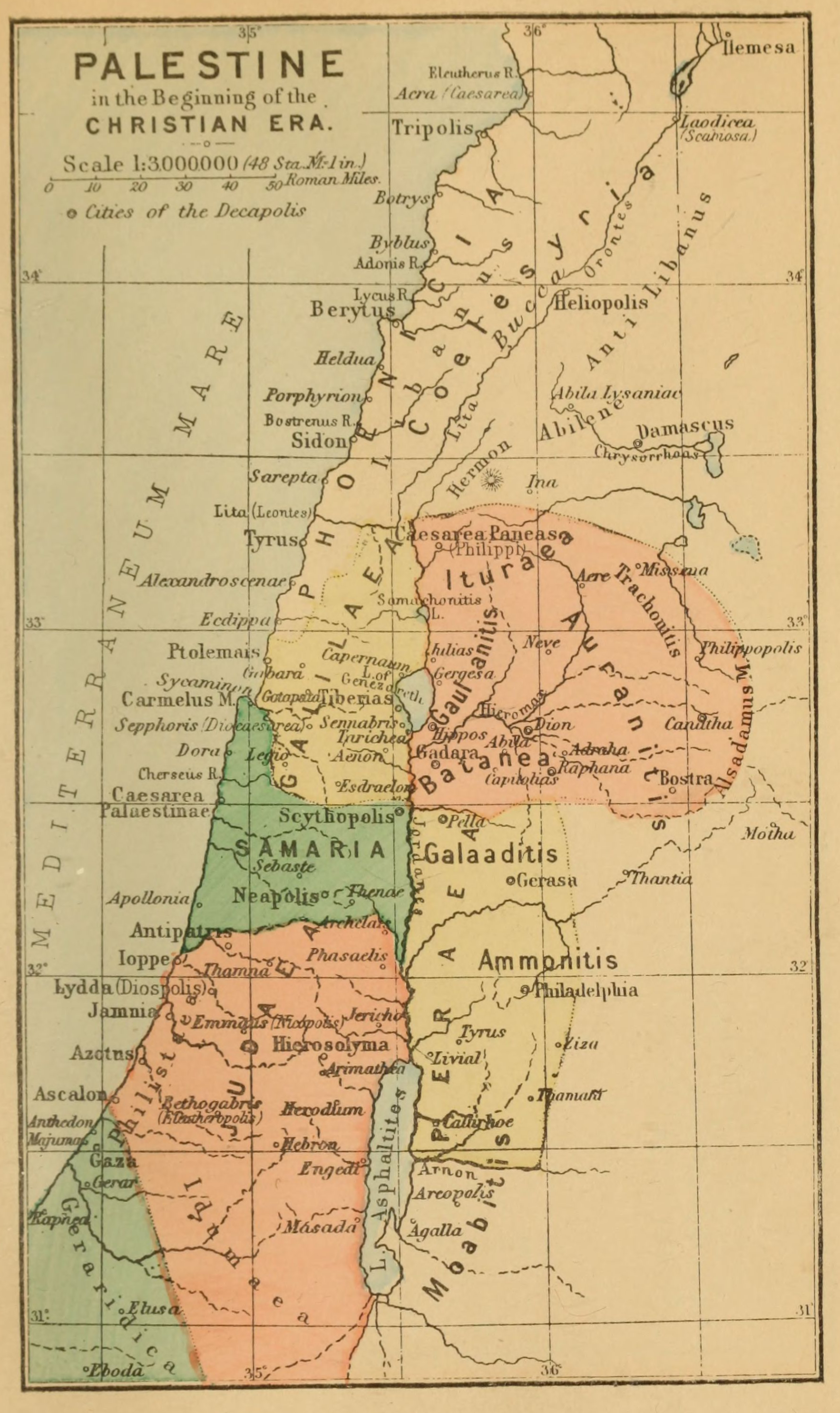
Map of Roman Palestine in the first century; according to Conder (1889)

in AD 39, the district of Iturea (Note: A region that included Mount Lebanon, Chalcis, and the Beqaa Valley) was given by Caligula to a certain Soemus, (Note: Also written as Sohemus) he was also known as the 'tetrarch of Lebanon' by the Romano-Jewish historian Josephus. Soemus reigned until his death in AD 49, when his kingdom was incorporated into the province of Syria (Tacitus, Annals, xii. 23).

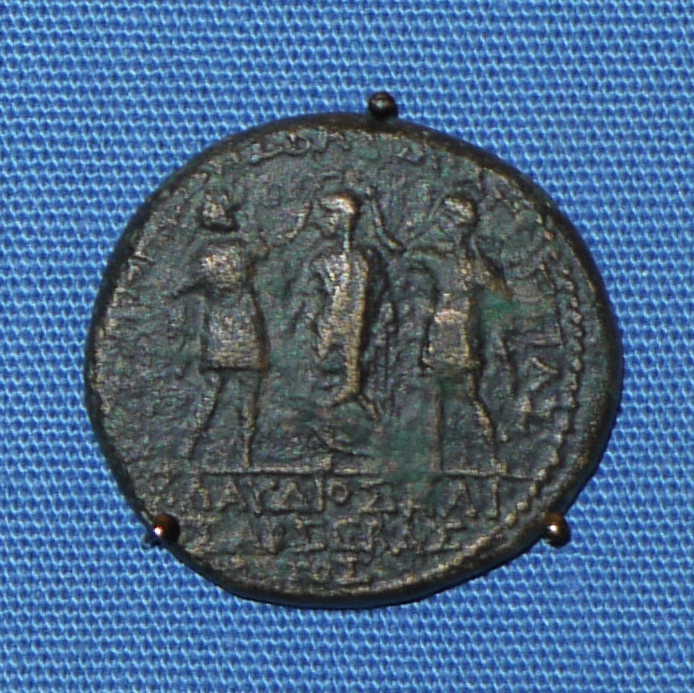
Coin of Herod of Chalcis, showing him with his brother Agrippa of Judaea crowning Roman Emperor Claudius I.

In AD 41, at Herod Agrippa's request, his brother Herod was given "Chalcis" in the Beqaa Valley, with its center of worship being Baalbek, and allowed the title of basileus by Claudius. King Herod of Chalcis reigned until his death in AD 48, whereupon his kingdom was given to Agrippa's son Agrippa II, though only as a tetrarchy.

In the Acts of the Apostles 12.20, in which Herod Agrippa is 'depicted as a typical persecuting tyrant', it is mentioned that the king furiously quarrelled with the people of Sidon and Tyre, and forbade the export of food to them. As they were dependent on delivery of food from Judea, and Judea was affected by famine, the two cities joined and sought an audience with him. After they secured support of Blastus, a trusted personal servant of the king, they asked for peace, because they depended on the king's country for their food supply.

Agrippa II expended large sums in beautifying Berytus (ancient Beirut), a Hellenised city in Phoenicia. His partiality for the Lebanese city rendered him unpopular amongst his Jewish subjects. He invested heavily in building a theater for the people of the city, providing them with annual spectacles and spending large sums—tens of thousands of drachmas—on the project. In addition, he supplied the people with grain and distributed olive oil. He also enhanced the city by erecting statues and replicas of ancient sculptures, essentially transferring nearly all of the kingdom’s ornaments to Berytus. This caused resentment among his subjects, as they felt stripped of their possessions to beautify a 'foreign city'. He was forced to give up the tetrarchy of Chalcis in AD 53, but in exchange Claudius made him ruler with the title of king over the territories previously governed by Philip the Tetrarch.

=== Reign of the Flavians ===
When the Roman emperor Vespasian (r. 1 July 69 – 23 June 79) and king Agrippa came to Tyre, the inhabitants of the city began to speak reproachfully of the king, and called him an enemy to the Romans; for they said that Philip, the general of his army, had betrayed the royal palace and the Roman forces that were in Jerusalem, and that it was done by his command. When Vespasian heard of this report, he rebuked the Tyrians for abusing a man who was "both a king and a friend to the Romans". Moreover, Vespasian maintained ties with the soldier-colony of Berytus and, after departing from Caesarea, received declarations of allegiance in Berytus. These came from various embassies representing Syria and other provinces, as well as from the legions and the governor of Syria, Mucianus.

Josephus highlights the connection between Berytus and the Flavians, describing Titus's journey through the East. After stopping in Caesarea in the winter of 70 CE, where he celebrated his brother's birthday with grand festivities, Titus moved to Berytus. He stayed there longer and marked his father's birthday on November 17 with extraordinary spectacles, showcasing great extravagance and ingenuity. Large numbers of Jewish captives from the Jewish War were executed in contests with wild beasts or with one another or in flames.

=== End of Chalcis ===
The tetrarchy of Chalcis previously surrendered by Agrippa II was subsequently in 57 given to his cousin Aristobulus, the son of Herod of Chalcis (Acts 25:13; 26:2,7). After the death of Aristobulus in AD 92, Chalcis was absorbed into the province of Syria.

According to Photius, Agrippa II died at the age of seventy in the third year of the reign of Trajan (AD 100), but statements of Josephus, in addition to the contemporary epigraphy from his kingdom. The modern scholarly consensus holds that he died before 93/94. Following his death his realm of Chalcis at the Beqaa as well came under the direct rule of Rome.

== Events ==
=== 30s ===
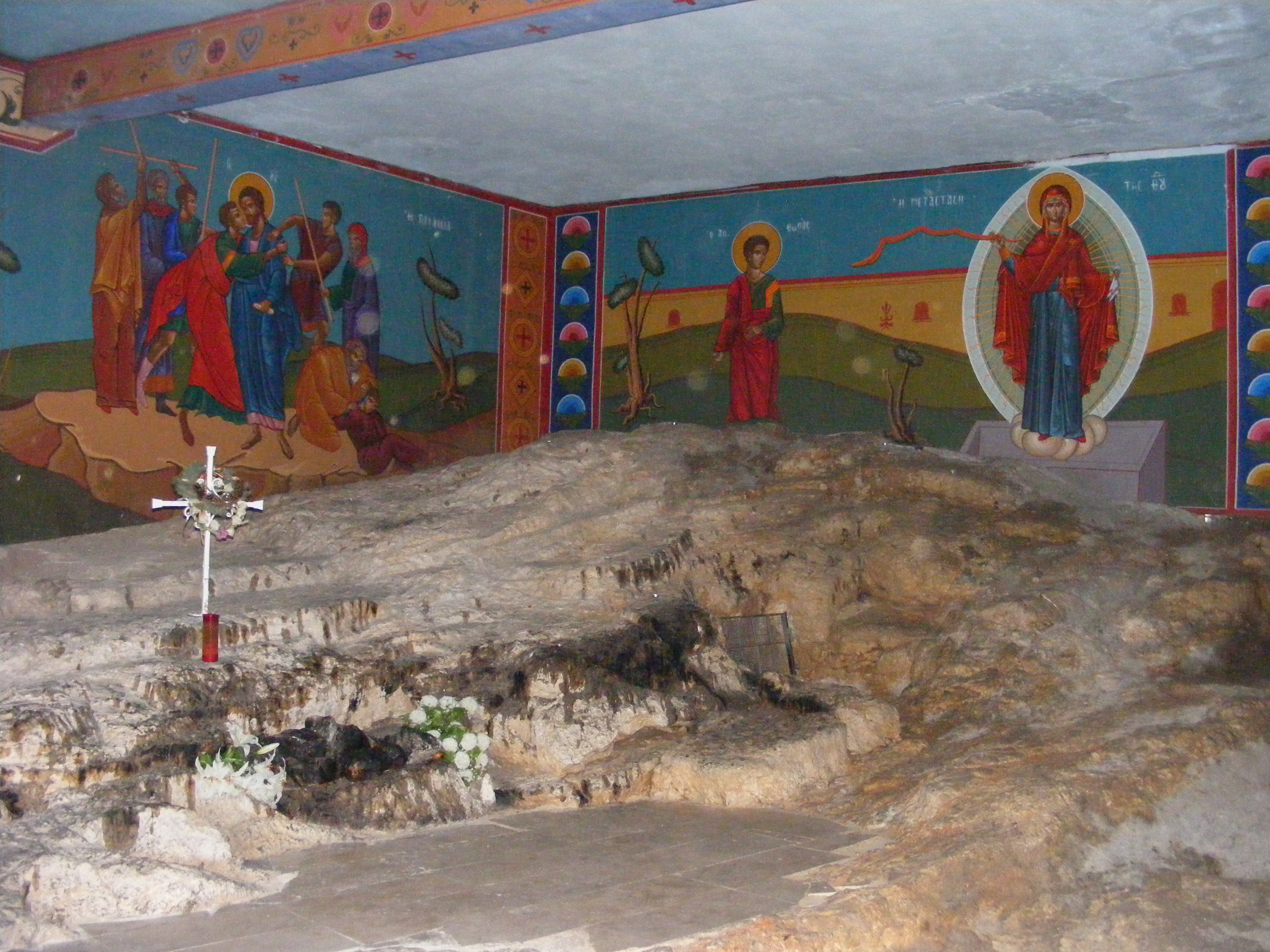
Reputed site of the stoning of the Christian deacon Stephen in c. AD 34, Greek Orthodox Church of St Stephen, Kidron Valley, Jerusalem

- Persecution of Christians in Jerusalem forces many followers to seek refuge in Lebanon around AD 34.
- Sohemus is tetrarch of Lebanon, AD 39.

=== 40s ===
- Herod I of Chalcis reigns as ruler of Chalcis, a small ancient kingdom of the Beqaa Valley, AD 41.

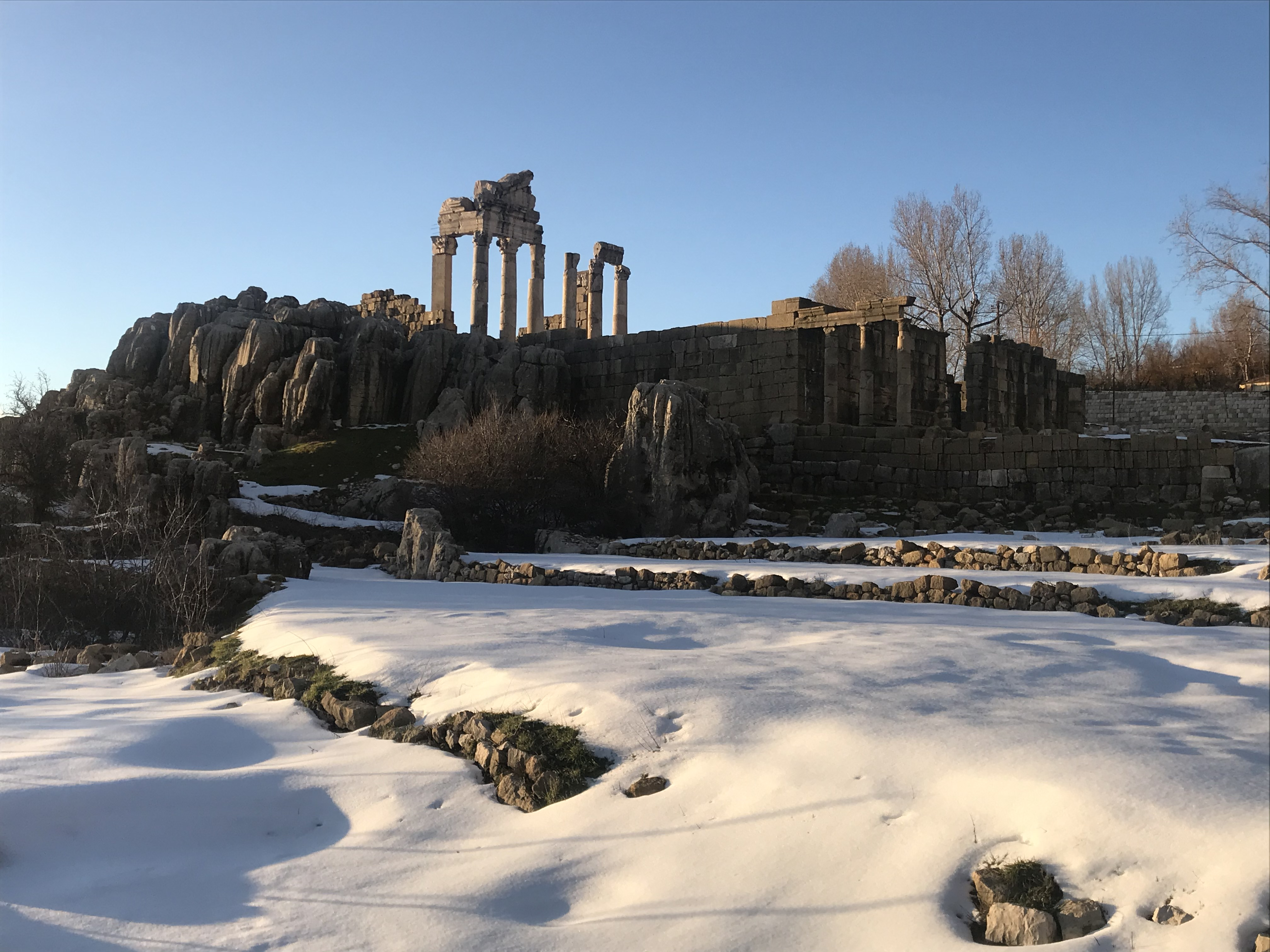
Ruins at Qalaat Faqra.

- The tower of Claudius in Qalaat Faqra, Kisrawan is completed in 43 AD.
- The temple of Zeus Beelgalasos, a sanctuary of Atargatis dedicated to Agrippa II and his sister Berenice, and two altars, are built in AD 44 in Qalaat Faqra.

=== 50s ===
- Governor of Syria Ummidius Durmius Quadratus is in Tyre in 52 AD; he sat for court hearings there.
- In AD 53, Agrippa II is forced to give up the tetrarchy of Chalcis, in exchange Claudius made him ruler with the title of king over the territories previously governed by Philip.
- According to a milestone from Berytus, in 56 AD Ummidius supervises construction work on one of the main roads of the province which ran along the Mediterranean coast and linked Ptolemais with Antioch.
- The tetrarchy of Chalcis is given to Agrippa's cousin, Aristobulus, AD 57.
- Paul the Apostle visits Tyre in AD 58 and meet with the Disciples and stays with them for 7 days. They pleaded with him not to go to Jerusalem due to persecution against Christians there.

=== 60s ===
- Paul the Apostle is allowed, on his way to Rome as a prisoner around AD 60, to meet his friends in Sidon.

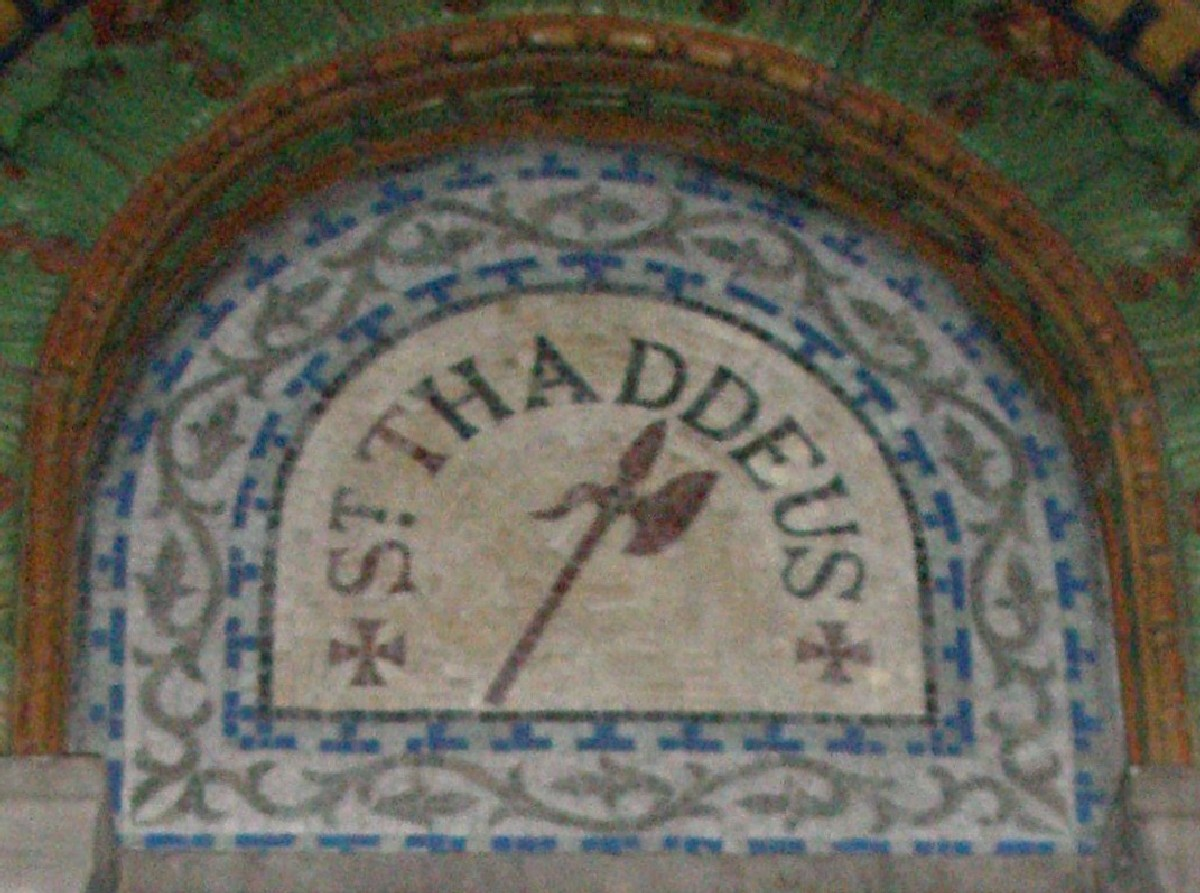
Symbol of the martyrdom of Thaddeus

- According to tradition, Thaddeus, together with Simon the Zealot, both apostles of Jesus, suffer martyrdom about AD 65 in Beirut.
- The city of Tyre helps the emperors Titus and Vespasian to suffocate the Jewish revolt in Palestine in AD 66.
- Shortly after the acclamation of Vespasian had occurred at Alexandria on July 1, he and Mucianus hold a conference at Berytus, planning their campaign in mid-July, AD 69.
- Lucius Antonius Naso, native of Baalbek, serves as tribune of the Praetorian Guard in the year 69.

=== 70s ===
- Titus celebrates his father's birthday on November 17, 70 AD in Berytus, showcasing costly spectacles and executing many Jewish captives.

=== 90s ===
- Aristobulus of Chalcis dies in AD 92, causing Chalcis to be absorbed into the Roman province of Syria.

== Religion ==
=== Paganism ===
Despite the Roman control over Beirut and its surrounding areas, there is a strong element of continuity with the Hellenistic past. The Greek god Poseidon is represented on Roman coins issued by Berytus, and it is almost certain that there was a Temple in the Roman city.

=== Ecclesiastical administration ===
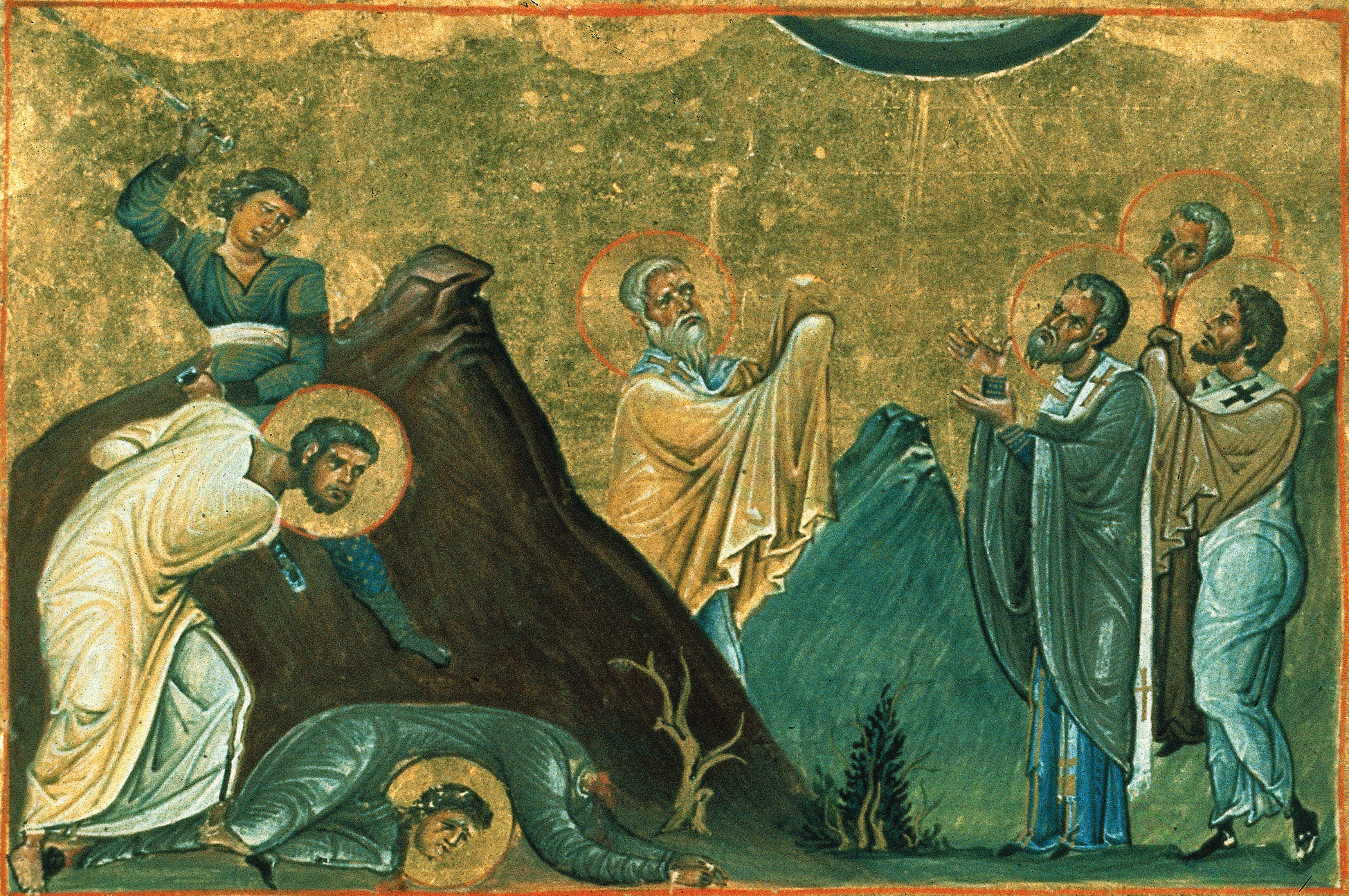
Disciples Erastus, Olympas, Rhodion, Sosipater, Quartus of Beirut and Tertius (Menologion of Basil II)

According to tradition, the diocese of Tripoli in Phoenicia was founded in the apostolic age with Maron (Note: Not to be confused with Maron, the 4th century religious figure) chosen as the first bishop by the apostle Peter, and Tyre was the seat of one of the oldest Christian communities, dating back to the dawn of Christianity, and Quartus was the bishop of Berytus (Beirut) c. AD 50. Traditionally, the Evangelist Mark is considered to have been the first Bishop of Byblos and Silas (Silouan) the first Bishop of Botris, both assigned to their sees by the Apostle Peter.

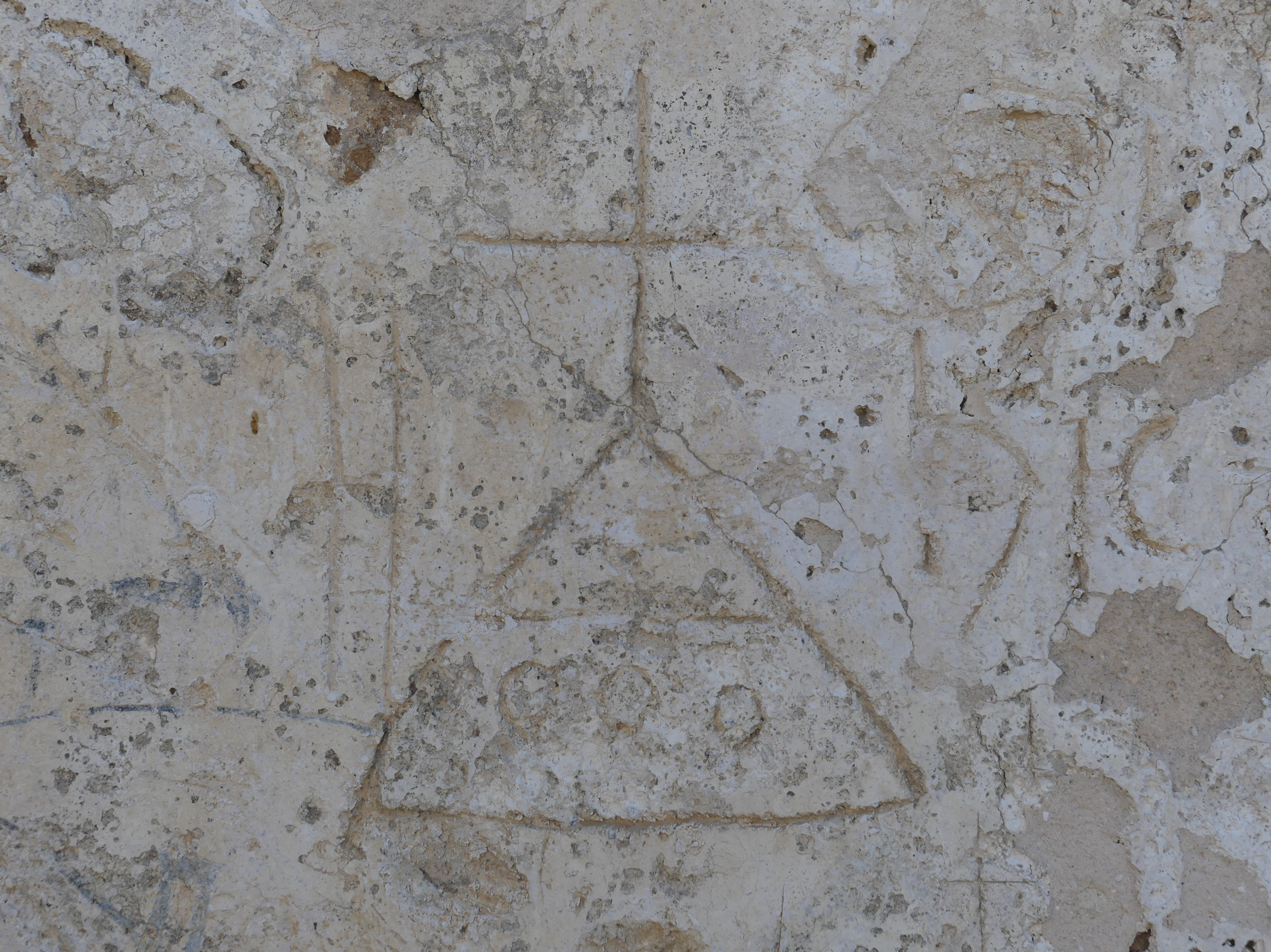
Crucifix graffiti on the walls of the ruined Savior Church in Tyre. It was built in a place where Jesus supposedly sat down on a rock and had a meal.

The city of Tyre is mentioned in the Gospels in a proverb quoted by Jesus himself (Matthew 11,21); according to the testimony of Luke (6.17), at the preaching of Jesus there were also faithful from the coast of Tyre and Sidon; and Jesus himself went to the region of Tyre and Sidon to work miracles such as the exorcism of the Syrophoenician woman's daughter (Mark 7,24-31). Soon a Christian community was formed in the city, which was visited by Paul the Apostle (Acts of the Apostles 21: 3-7) on his last journey to Jerusalem before his arrest.

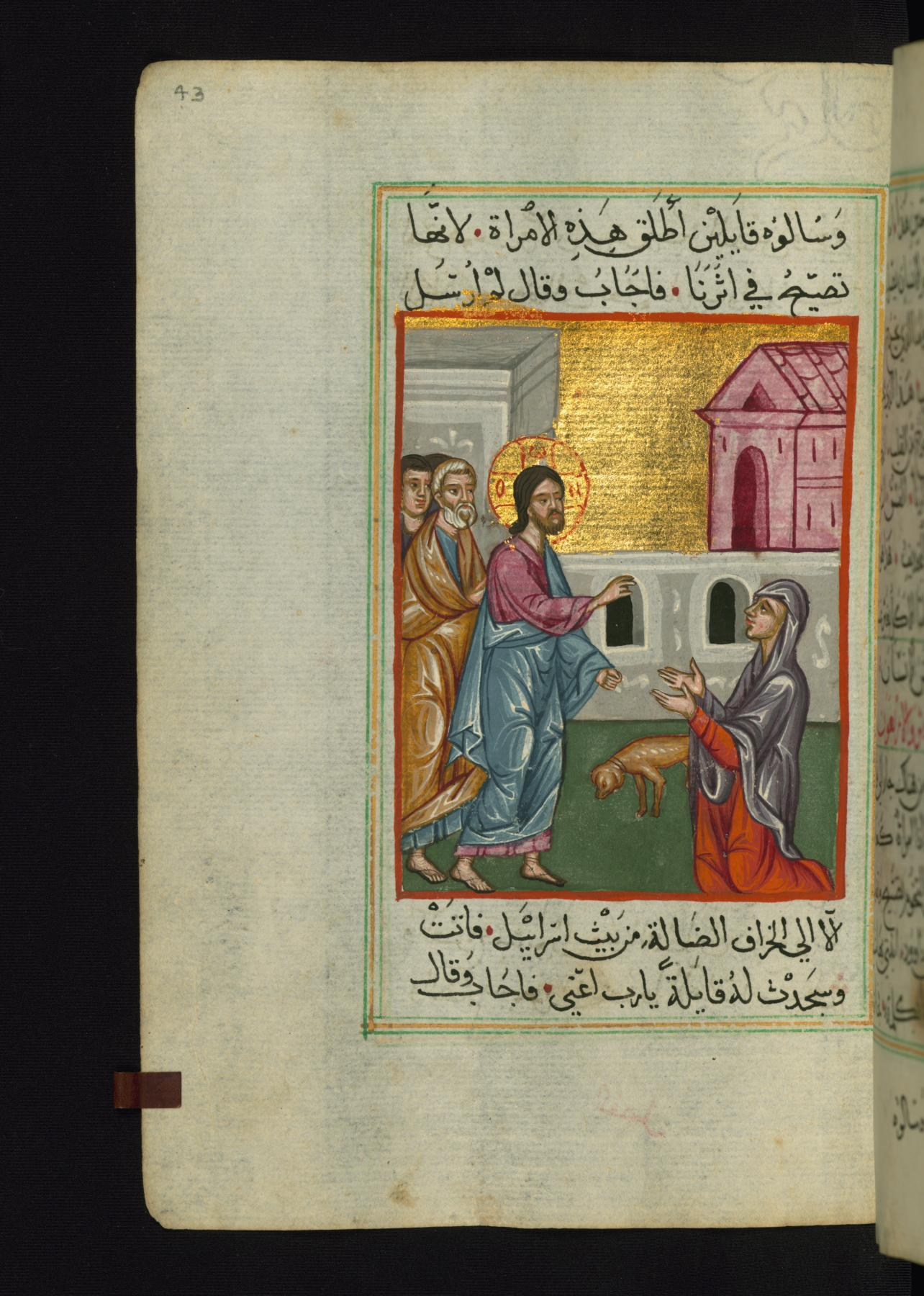
Arabic miniature painting of the exorcism of the Syrophoenician woman's daughter, 1684 AD.

== Economy ==
During the reign of Vespasian, shops in the forum were restored. There is also evidence in Josephus of substantial Jewish interest in silk, both in trade and production, especially in Berytus and Tyre. In the Roman period, Jiyeh was a production site of Beirut Type 2 amphorae (Note: The form – Beirut Type 1 – has a projecting rim and fairly large handles. Beirut Type 2 is similar to the first form with a more defined rim and was produced in the Augustan period, suddenly ending by the late 1st century CE.) transporting olive oil from the 1st century AD onwards, and local produce from Berytus, probably wine, was carried in locally made amphorae stamped with the name of the city, “BER,” and “COL”.

== Architecture ==
- Two lower Roman temples that date back to the 1st century AD, Niha, Zahlé.
- Roman temple of Bziza.
- Tower of Claudius, temple of Zeus, a sanctuary, and two altars, Qalaat Faqra, Kisrawan.
- In the mid-1st century, a number of Julio-Claudian emperors enriched the sanctuary of the Temple of Jupiter, Baabek, causing it to be largely completed by AD 60 as evidenced by a graffito located on one of the topmost column drums.
- A statue of Liber Pater, Roman Forum in Beirut, placed during the reign of Vespasian.

=== Public buildings ===
Historical records from Josephus highlight the construction of several notable public buildings in Berytus by Herod Agrippa, including a theatre, an amphitheatre, baths, and porticoes. Additionally, Josephus recounts that during the inauguration of these structures, 1,400 prisoners were forced to participate in gladiatorial battles.

== People ==
=== 20s ===
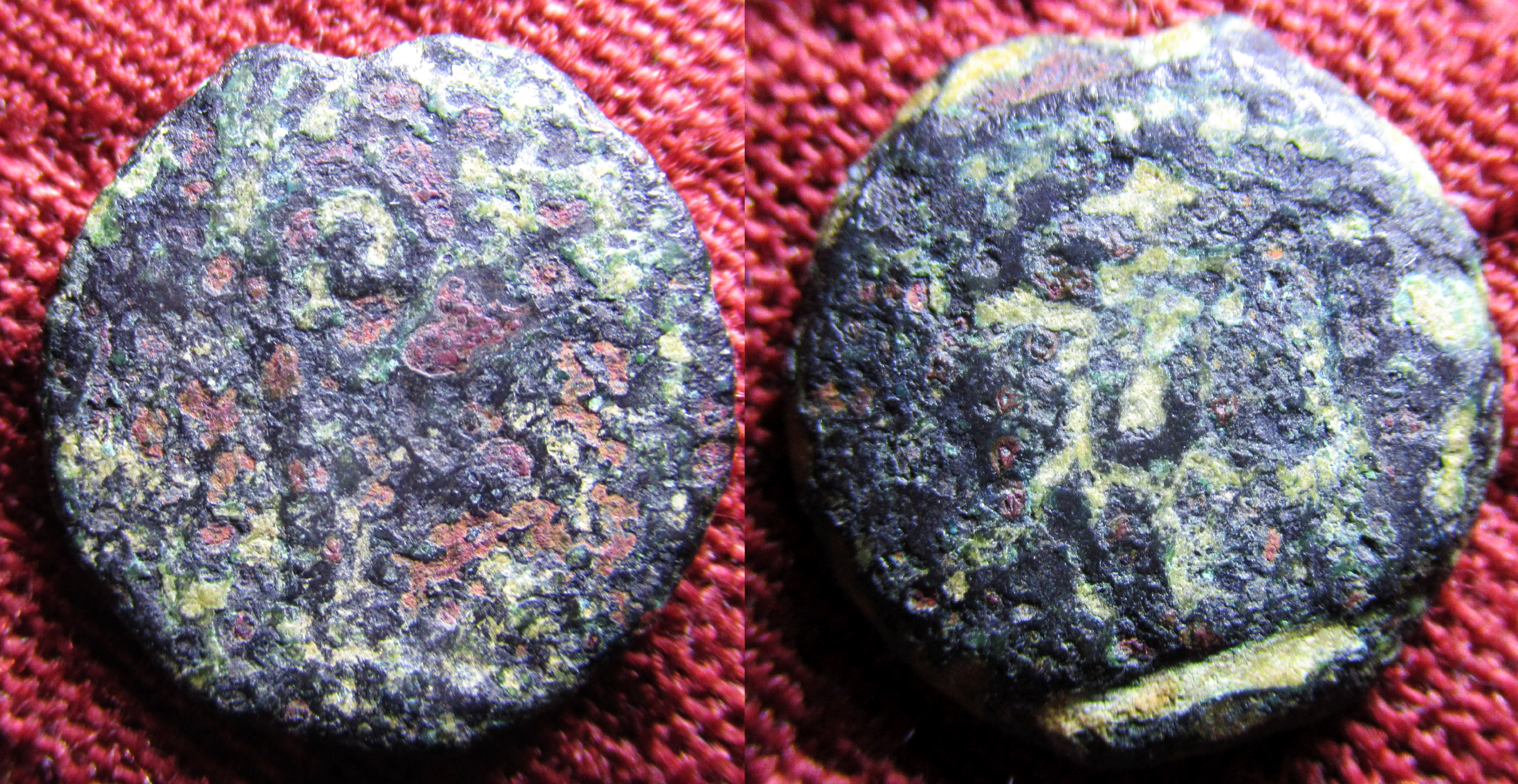
Bronze prutah of Pontius Pilate (worn, clipped, 15mm, 1.97g.). Obverse: ΤΙΒΕΡΙΟΥ ΚΑΙΣΑΡΟΣ surrounding lituus. Reverse: Wreath surrounding date LIϚ (year 16, 29/30 CE). Found in Lebanon.

- The Roman Latin grammarian, literature master, philologist and critic Marcus Valerius Probus, who flourished under the reign of Nero, is born in Berytus, c. AD 25.

=== 40s ===
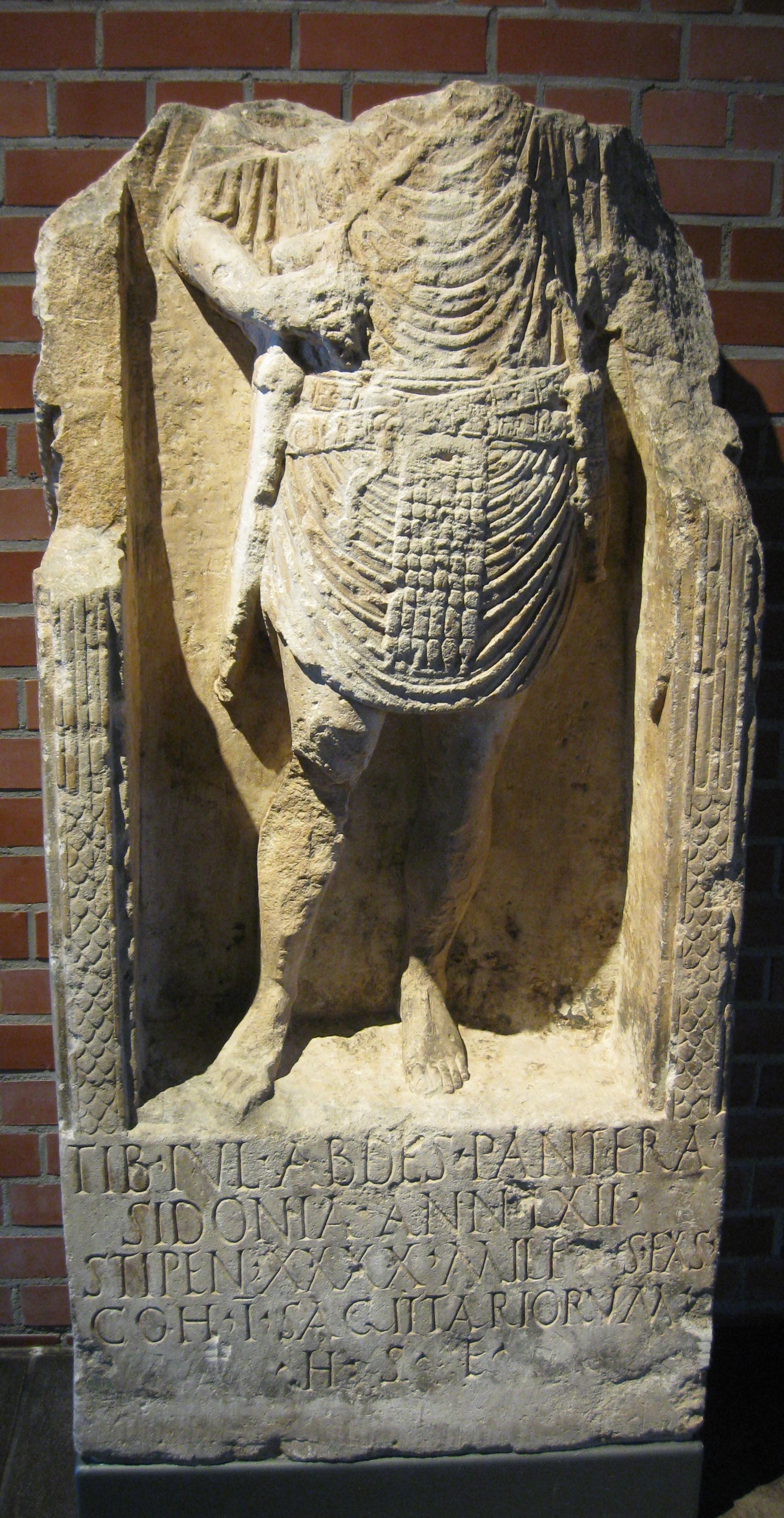
Tombstone of Roman soldier Tiberius Julius Abdes Pantera.

- Tiberius Julius Abdes Pantera, a Roman soldier of Phoenician descent born in Sidon, dies in AD 40, at the age of 62 years.
- Antiquarian writer of grammatical, lexical and historical works and writer of Phoenician history Philo of Byblos is born c. AD 42.
- Herod I dies in AD 48, passing his throne to his son, Herod Agrippa II.

=== 70s ===
- The cartographer and mathematician Marinus of Tyre is born, c. AD 70. The projection method of his charts, from the Atlantic to China, will be picked up and revived by Mercator fourteen centuries later.

== See also ==
- Christianity in the 1st century

== Sources ==
- Linda Jones Hall, Roman Berytus: Beirut in late antiquity (2004)
- Le Quien, Michel (1740). Oriens Christianus, in quatuor Patriarchatus digestus: quo exhibentur ecclesiæ, patriarchæ, cæterique præsules totius Orientis. Tomus secundus, in quo Illyricum Orientale ad Patriarchatum Constantinopolitanum pertinens, Patriarchatus Alexandrinus & Antiochenus, magnæque Chaldæorum & Jacobitarum Diœceses exponuntur (in Latin). Paris: Ex Typographia Regia. cols. 829–832. OCLC 955922747.
- Kropp, Andreas; Lohmann, Daniel (April 2011). "'Master, look at the size of those stones! Look at the size of those buildings!' Analogies in Construction Techniques Between the Temples at Heliopolis (Baalbek) and Jerusalem". Levant (1): 38–50. doi:10.1179/007589111X12966443320819.
- Lyttelton, Margaret (1996). "Baalbek", vol. 3, pp. 1–3, in The Dictionary of Art, 34 volumes, edited by Jane Turner. New York: Grove. ISBN 978-1-884446-00-9.
- Rowland, Benjamin Jr. (1956), "The Vine-Scroll in Gandhāra", Artibus Asiae, vol. 19, No. 3/4, pp. 353–361
- Paturel, Simone (2019-07-01), Baalbek-Heliopolis, the Bekaa, and Berytus from 100 BCE to 400 CE, BRILL, ISBN 978-90-04-40073-3
