= Seven Robbers =

Martyrs
- Died: 2nd century Corfu
- Venerated in: Eastern Orthodox Church; Roman Catholic Church
- Feast: April 27, April 28 (Eastern Orthodox liturgics), April 29, April 20 (Catholic Calendar)

The Seven Robbers (Latin: Septem latrones) were martyrs on the island of Corcyra (Corfu) in the 2nd century AD. Their names were Saturninus, Insischolus (Jakischolus), Faustianus, Januarius, Marsalius, Euphrasius, and Mammius.

== Life ==
The Greek menologia (calendars of the saints) inform us that Sts. Jason and Sosipater, who had been instructed in Christianity by the Apostles or by Jesus himself, came to the island of Corcyra to preach Christianity. After making numerous conversions, they were cast into a dungeon where the above-named seven robbers were imprisoned. They succeeded in converting the robbers who were then taken outside the city and martyred by being cast into cauldrons that were filled with seething oil and pitch.

== Commemoration ==
Some Greek menologies mention them on April 27, others, on April 29. In the Roman martyrology, The Seven Robbers are commemorated on April 20.
