= List of Orthodox saints =

List of Orthodox saints may refer to:

- Lists of Eastern Orthodox saints
- List of Oriental Orthodox saints

== See also ==
- List of Catholic saints
