= List of Oriental Orthodox saints =

This is a partial list of canonised saints in the Oriental Orthodox Churches.

== List ==
Some saints listed may also be a part of a larger group of saints also listed (particularly martyrs, such as the 21 Coptic Christian Martyrs of Libya and the 40 Martyrs of Sebaste).

Image	Saint	Died (Year)	Feast Day	Notes
	21 Coptic Martyrs of Libya	2015	15 February (Alexandria)	Murdered by the Islamic State for their Christian belief on 15‌ February 2015
	Abraham of Minuf		9 November (Alexandria, Axum)	Disciple of Pachomius and Theodore
	Agathon the Hermit	435	18 October (Alexandria, Axum)	Prominent Desert Father and disciple of Abba Poemen
	Anthony the Great	356	18 January (Antioch); 22 Topa (Alexandria); Monday after 5th Sunday of Exaltation of the Cross (Armenia)	Desert Father, hermit, mystic, dubbed "Father of All Monks"
	Athanasius of Alexandria	373	7 Pashons (Alexandria); 18‌ January (Antioch)	Church Father, chief proponent of Trinitarianism against Arianism
	Barsauma	456	February 3 (Antioch); 9 Meshir (Alexandria)	Monk, ascetic, and defender of orthodoxy, dubbed "Chief of Hermits"
	Cleopas the Apostle	1st Century	10 November (Alexandria, Axum)	One of the Seventy Apostles
	Cyril of Alexandria	444	27 June (Antioch); 3 Epip (Alexandria)	Pope of Alexandria and presiding bishop at the Council of Ephesus, dubbed "Pillar of Faith"
	Cyrus of Qartmin		10 November (Antioch)	Disciple of Samuel of Qartmin
	Daniel the Hermit	300s	20 October (Antioch)	Companion to Matthew the Hermit and founder a monastery bearing his name near the Monastery of Saint Matthew; the Monastery of Saint Daniel is also nicknamed "The Beetles' Monastery" since beetles appear on the monastery walls on his feast day
	Demetrius of Antioch	252	10 November (Antioch)	Fifteenth Patriarch of Antioch
	Dioscurus of Alexandria	454	7 Thout (Alexandria); 4 September (Antioch)	Pope of Alexandria and defender of orthodoxy against Chalcedonian persecution
	Ephrem the Syrian	373	First Saturday of Lent (Antioch); 15 Epip (Alexandria)	One of the most celebrated Fathers of the Syriac tradition, dubbed "Harp of the Spirit"
	Eumenes of Alexandria	141	19 October (Alexandria)	Seventh pope of Alexandria
	Forty Martyrs of Sebaste	320	9 March (Antioch); 29 March (Armenia)	Forty Roman soldiers executed for refusing to denounce their belief in Christ, including one of the executors himself; Assyrians celebrate Rozune in their honour
	Gregory Barhebraeus	1286	30 July (Antioch)	Maphrian, theologian, philosopher, physician, and scientist
	Gregory the Illuminator	331	30 September (Antioch, Alexandria, Armenia, Axum)	Illuminator of Armenia, converted it from Zoroastrianism to Christianity in 301
Malnazar_-_Hannah_before_Eli_the_High_Priest_-_Google_Art_Project	Hannah the Prophetess		16 October (Alexandria)	The mother of Samuel the Prophet
Dome_of_Immanuel_in_St_Mark's_Basilica-Hosea	Hosea the Prophet		17 October (Antioch)	One of the Twelve Minor Prophets
	Ignatius of Antioch	107	17 October & 20 December (Antioch); 7 Epip (Alexandria); Monday after 4th Sunday of Advent (Armenia)	Successor of Peter, patriarch of Antioch, namesake of Antiochian patriarchs since 1293, dubbed "Theophorus" (God-Bearer) or "Nuhrono" (Illuminated)
	Jacob of Edessa	708	5 June (Antioch)	Bishop of Edessa, poet, translator, historian, philosopher-theologian and commentator
	Jacob of Serug	521	29 November (Antioch)	Poet, theologian, and defender of Miaphysitism in the Syriac church
Prophet_Joel	Joel the Prophet		19 October (Antioch)	One of the Twelve Minor Prophets
	John Chrysostom	407	30 October (Armenia); 13 November (Antioch); 17 Hator (Alexandria)	Greek Church Father and prolific writer
	John of Qartmin	1034	10 November (Antioch)	Greatly expanded the monastery's library, and restored the use of the estrangelo script
	John of Tella	538	6 February (Antioch)	Bishop of Tella who helped preserve the Antiochian hierarchy during times of severe persecution
	Kyrillos VI	1971	9 March (Alexandria)	116th Pope of Alexandria, with many miracles attributed to him
Pope_Liberius_(Nuremberg_Chronicle)	Liberius of Rome	366	October 19 (Axum)	Pope of Rome
Malnazar_-_Saint_Luke_-_Google_Art_Project_cropped	Luke the Evangelist	84	18 October (Antioch)	One of the Four Evangelists
	Mark the Apostle	68	9 November (Alexandria)	One of the Four Evangelists
	Martyrs of the Sayfo and Armenian genocide	1914-1924	24 April (Armenia); 15 June (Antioch)	Orchestrated genocide of the Assyrians and Armenians by the Ottoman Empire and Kurdish tribes during World War I
	Maximus of Africa and his companions	295	10 November (Alexandria, Axum)	Martyrs under Decius
	Mercurius Philopater	250	16 June, 1 August, & 4 December (Alexandria)	Roman soldier, martyr, called the "Two-sworded"‌ (أبو سيفين; Abū Sēfēin)
	Metras	249	18 October (Alexandria, Axum)	Alexandrian martyr under Decius
	Michael the Syrian	1199	7 November (Antioch)	Patriarch of Antioch, chronicler, and historian
	Moses bar Kepha	903	12 February (Antioch)	Bishop and prolific writer in the Syriac Orthodox Church
	Olympas the Apostle		10 November (Antioch)	One of the Seventy Apostles who was martyred with Rhodion in Rome
	Paul of Tammah	415	17 October (Alexandria, Axum)	Desert Father
Saint_pelagia	Pelagia the Pentinent	460	21 October (Alexandria)	Harlot who repented at the hands of Bishop Nonnus
	Philoxenus of Mabbug	523	10 December (Antioch)	Bishop of Mabbug, defender of Miaphysite orthodoxy, dubbed "Teacher of Teachers" (ܡܠܦܢܵܐ ܕܡܠܦܢܹܐ; Malphōnô d-Malphōnē)
	Pishoy	417	2 July (Antioch); 8 Epip/15 July (Alexandria)	Desert Father, ascetic, personally witnessed Christ; dubbed the "Perfect Man"
	Rhodion the Apostle		10 November (Antioch)	One of the Seventy Apostles who was martyred with Olympas in Rome
Saints_Sergius_and_Bacchus,_7th_century_BC	Sergius	400s	20 October (Alexandria)	Companion to Bacchus and martyr
	Severus of Antioch	538	8 February (Alexandria); 29 September (Antioch)	Church Father, Patriarch of Antioch, also called Severus the Great and Crown of the Syrians
	Shahdost and his 128 Companions	342	19 October (Antioch)	Persian bishop of Seleucia-Ctesiphon and martyr
ശിമയോൻ_ബർ_സമ്പായും_സഹരക്തസാക്ഷികളും	Simeon Bar Sabbae	345	19 October (Alexandria, Axum)	Bishop of Seleucia-Ctesiphon, martyred at the hands of Shapur II
	Symeon the Stylite	459	July 27 (Antioch); 29 Pashons (Alexandria)	Ascetic monk who spent most of his life atop a pillar
Syro-Malabar_icon_of_Throne_of_Mar_Thoma	Thomas the Apostle	72	19 October (Axum)	Apostle to and patron of India
Varus,_and_with_him_six_monk-martyrs_(Menologion_of_Basil_II)	Varus	307	19 October (Antioch)	Egyptian soldier and martyr
	Yared	571	19 May (Axum)	Aksumite composer, hymnwriter, and scholar

== Bibliography ==
- Armenian Church (2002). Domar: The Calendrical and Liturgical Cycle of the Armenian Apostolic Orthodox Church, 2003 A.D. Armenian Orthodox Theological Research Institute.
- Rajan, K. Mani (2007). Martyrs, Saints & Prelates of the Syriac Orthodox Church (PDF). Vol. 1. J. S. C. Publications, Patriarchal Centre, Puthencruz.
- Rajan, K. Mani (2017). Martyrs, Saints & Prelates of the Syriac Orthodox Church (PDF). Vol. 5. J. S. C. Publications, Patriarchal Centre, Puthencruz.
- Rajan, K. Mani (2023). Martyrs, Saints & Prelates of the Syriac Orthodox Church (350 Biographies) (PDF). Mor Adai Study Centre; Cheeranchira, Changanacherry-686 106.
