= Lucius Antonius Naso =

Lucius Antonius Naso was a man of ancient Rome who served as tribune of the Praetorian Guard in the year 69, and procurator of the Roman province of Bithynia et Pontus during the reign of Vespasian. It is likely he was from Heliopolis (modern Baalbek), as that is where the most notable inscription about his life was found.

Antonius was dismissed from the Praetorian Guard by the emperor Galba, likely for disloyalty, but appears to have regained imperial favor after Galba's fall, and was able to resume his military career afterward. It's likely he acquired his military decorations either during the rebellion of Gaius Iulius Vindex against the emperor Nero, or during the fight against the Pisonian conspiracy in 65.

== See also ==
- 1st century in Lebanon
