= Quartus =

Early Christian saint

Saint Quartus of Berytus
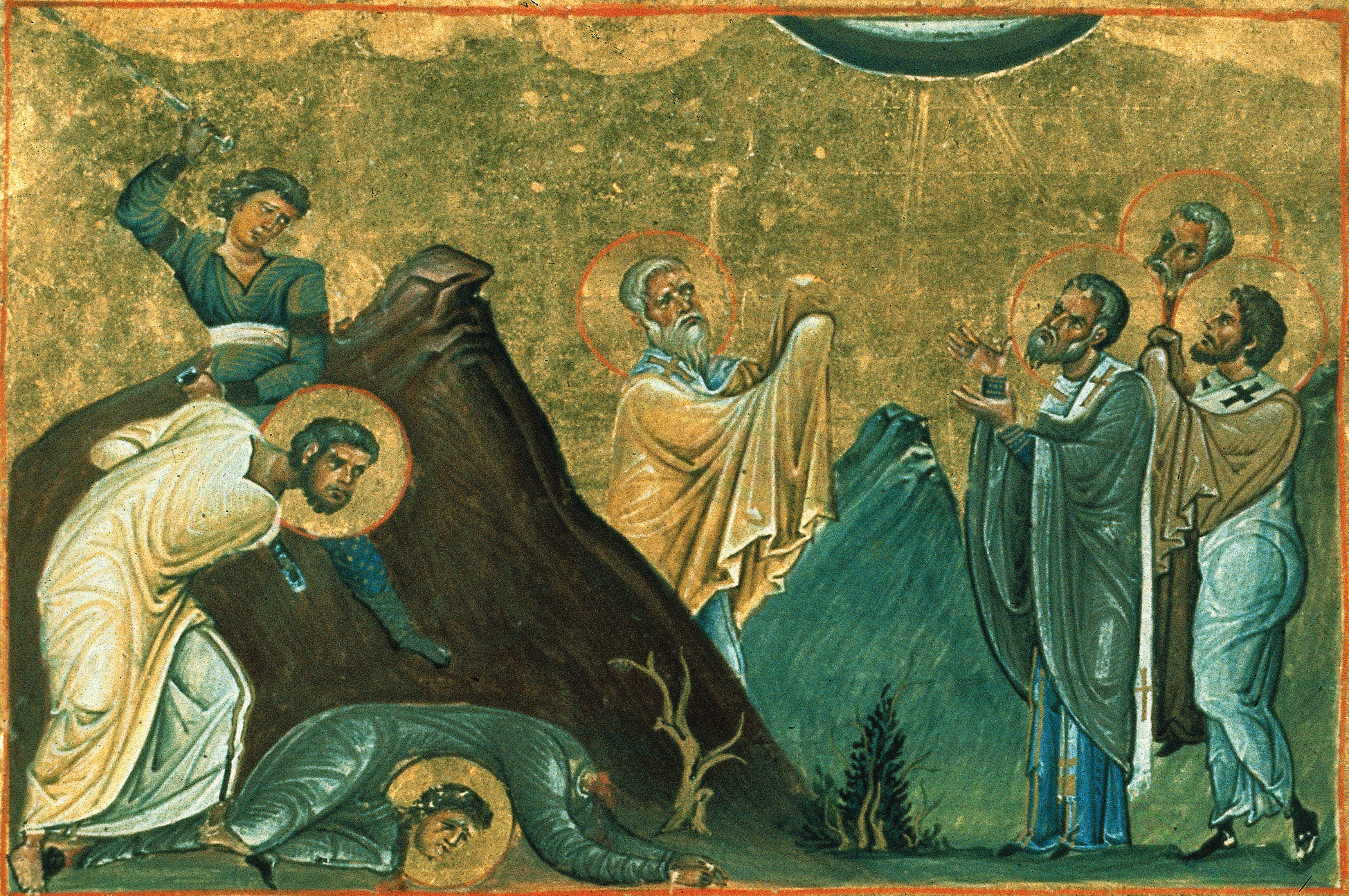
- Erastus, Olympas, Rhodion, Sosipater, Quartus and Tertius (Menologion of Basil II)

Apostle of the Seventy Bishop of Berytus and Hieroconfessor
- Born: Unknown (1st century); Athens, Achaia, Roman Empire
- Died: 4 October (1st century); Athens, Achaia, Roman Empire
- Venerated in: Eastern Orthodox Church; Oriental Orthodox Church; Syriac Orthodox Church
- Feast: 10 November; 4 January

Quartus (Greek: Κούαρτος, romanized: Kouartos) was an early Christian saint who is mentioned in the Bible.

According to church tradition, he is known as Quartus of Berytus and is numbered among the Seventy Disciples. Furthermore, he was Bishop of Beirut and suffered for the faith. He converted many to the Christian faith. His feast day is 10 November. He is also commemorated on 4 January with the Seventy Disciples.

== Description ==
Quartus was born in the city of Athens, and was one of its wealthy and learned nobles. He believed in the Lord Christ and served him. Having received the grace of the Comforter on the day of Pentecost, he preached the gospel in many countries. He entered the city of Magnis and preached there. The people of the city believed; he baptized them and taught them the commandments. Then he returned to Athens, to preach there also, but they stoned him and tortured him severely. Despite all of his sufferings, he survived them and died peacefully in Berytus.

== Biblical accounts ==
The New American Standard Bible translates Romans 16:23 as follows:

Gaius, host to me and to the whole church, greets you. Erastus, the city treasurer greets you, and Quartus, the brother.

— Romans 16:23

Although the literal translation of the Greek is that Quartus is "the" brother, most scholars interpret this as meaning that Quartus is a fellow believer, rather than a brother of Erastus. Thus, some translations such as the NIV translate the phrase as "our brother Quartus".

== Hymns ==
Troparion (Tone 3)

Holy Apostles, Erastus, Olympas, Herodian, Sosipater, Quartus and Tertius,
entreat the merciful God,
to grant our souls forgiveness of transgressions.

Kontakion (Tone 2)

Illumined by divine light, O holy apostles,
you wisely destroyed the works of idolatry.
When you caught all the pagans you brought them to the Master
and taught them to glorify the Trinity.

Source: St. Nikolai Velimirovic, The Prologue from Ohrid

== See also ==
- 1st century in Lebanon
