= Jason of Thessalonica =

Christian saint

Jason
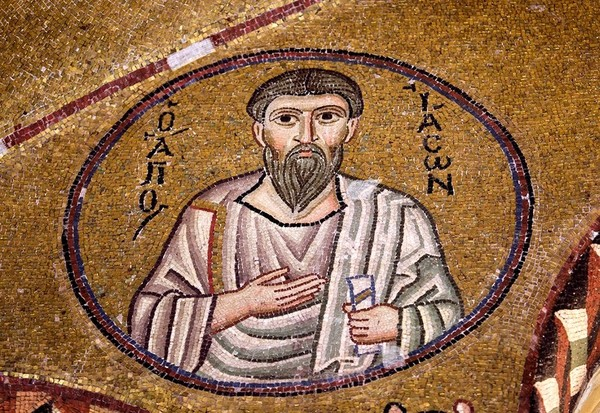
- Venerated in: Eastern Orthodox Church; Catholic Church; Oriental Orthodox Church
- Feast: April 28, July 12, 3 Pashons

Jason of Thessalonica (Greek: Ίάσων ό Θεσσαλονικεύς), also known as Jason of Tarsus, was a Jewish convert and early Christian believer mentioned in the New Testament in Acts 17:5–9 and Romans 16:21.

Jason is venerated as a saint in the Orthodox and Roman Catholic traditions. His feast day is 12 July in the Roman Catholic Church, 28 April in the Slavic Christian tradition, and 29 April in the Greek Christian tradition. His feast is celebrated on the 3rd of Pashons in the Coptic Orthodox Church and in eastern Christian traditions he is commemorated on 4 January among the Seventy Apostles.

== Biblical account ==
In Acts 17, Jason's house in Thessalonica was being used as a refuge by the apostles Paul, Silas, and Timothy. Some Thessalonian Jews were annoyed with Paul's remarks in their synagogue and so, not finding him and Silas, they dragged Jason and some of the other Christian disciples before the city authorities, where he was fined and released. Jason is specifically accused of having "welcomed" the apostles.

Paul referred to Jason, Lucius and Sosipater as his "countrymen" (Greek: οἱ συγγενεῖς μου) in Romans 16:21, which has led some to call him "Jason of Tarsus" (since Paul was from Tarsus). However, most scholars understand Paul's use of "countryman" here and elsewhere to mean "fellow Jew". Both references to Jason point 'very probably' to the same person.

== Hagiography ==
The literary source (hagiographic legend) of the life of Jason and Sosipater was newly edited and translated by B. Kindt as appendix to "La version longue du récit légendaire de l'évangelisation de Corfou par les saints Jason and Sosipatre", Analecta Bollandiana 116 (1998) 259–295.

Born in Tarsus, he was appointed Bishop of Tarsus by the Apostle Paul. With the apostle Sosipater he traveled to the island of Corfu, where they built a church in honor of the Apostle Stephen the Protomartyr and converted many pagans to the Christian faith. Seeing this, the king of Corfu threw them into prison where they converted seven other prisoners to the Christian faith: Saturninus, Jakischolus, Faustianus, Januarius, Marsalius, Euphrasius and Mammius. The king had those seven put to death in boiling pitch for their faith.

The king's daughter, the virgin Cercyra, having watched these holy apostles being tortured, turned to the Christian faith and distributed all her jewels to the poor. The king became angry and put her in prison, yet she would not deny Christ. So he had the prison burned, but she remained unharmed. Many people were baptized upon seeing this miracle. He then had her killed with arrows while tied to a tree.

Many believers fled to a nearby island to get away from the enraged king, but as he chased them, his boat sank. The new king embraced the Christian faith and in baptism received the name Sebastian. From then on Sosipater and Jason freely preached the Gospel and built up the Church in Corfu until a very old age, when they gave up their souls to God.

Vlatades Monastery in Thessaloniki is believed to have been built on the former site of Jason's house.

His relics are believed to be held primarily in the Holy Monastery of Hosios Loukas in Greece, as well as the Church of Saints Jason and Sosipatros in Corfu, Greece.

== See also ==
- Acts 17
- First Epistle to the Thessalonians
- Sosipater
- Lucius of Cyrene
- Nikolai Velimirovic, The Prologue of Ohrid

== Attribution ==
This article incorporates text from Apostle Jason at OrthodoxWiki which is licensed under the CC-BY-SA and GFDL.
