= Konstanti Kakhi =

Georgian nobleman

Saint Konstanti Kakhay
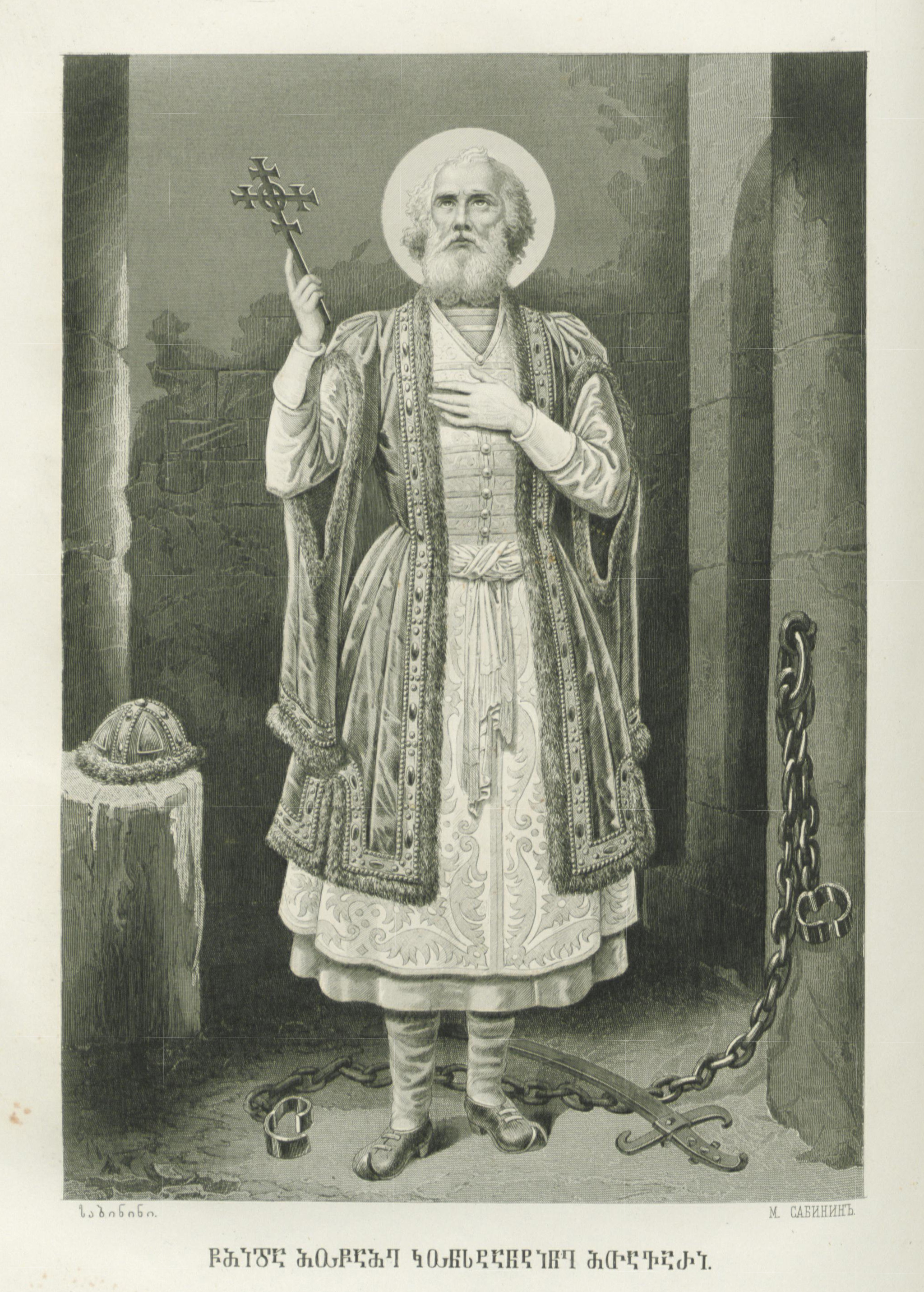
- Saint Konstanti Kakhay by Mikhail Sabinin
- Born: 768; Kartli
- Died: 10 November 853 (aged 84–85); Samarra, Iraq
- Venerated in: Eastern Orthodox Church; Roman Catholic Church; Anglican Communion
- Feast: 10 November

Konstanti Kakhay or Konstanti Kakhi (Georgian: კონსტანტი კახაჲ; კონსტანტი კახი) (768 – November 10, 853) was a Christian Georgian nobleman from Kartli, who was seized captive by the Abbasid general Bugha al-Kabir during his 853 expedition into the Caucasus. He was subsequently put to death, at the age of 85, for refusing to convert to Islam. This made Kostanti a subject of the contemporaneous hagiography and a saint of the Georgian Orthodox Church.

Kakhay's capture is also documented in a Georgian inscription from the Ateni Sioni church and his death as a martyr is mentioned by the 9th-10th century Armenian chronicler Tovma Artsruni. The Georgian church commemorates him on November 10 (O.S.).

== The Life and Passion of Kostanti-Kakhay ==
Much of Kostanti-Kakhay's biography is known from the hagiographic work The Life and Passion of Kostanti-Kakhay, the full title of which is "the Life and Passion of the Holy Martyr Kostanti the Georgian, who was Martyred by Jafar, King of Babylonians" (ცხორებაჲ და წამებაჲ წმიდისა მოწამისა კოსტანტი ქართველისაჲ, რომელი იწამა ბაბილონელთა მეფისა ჯაფარის მიერ, cxorebaj da c'amebaj c'midisa moc'amisa k'ost'ant'isi kartvelisaj, romeli ic'ama babiloelta mepisa dzaparis mier). Its anonymous author, apparently a monk, identifies himself as a contemporary of Kostanti, saying that the martyr "lived during our time", when Theodora, the Byzantine empress who opposed iconoclasm, reigned as a "servant of God". In the same passage, the author also mentions Theodora's son Michael III (r. 842-67).

In general, the Life and Passion of Kostanti-Kakhay reflects the rise of Byzantine cultural and political influence and of Georgian nationalism. The text incorporates many other narratives and contains several biblical allusions. Its opening phrases are a literal translation from George of Alexandria's Life of Saint John Chrysostom (c. 620), a text otherwise unknown in Georgian until 968. It also echoes several passages from the earlier pieces of Georgian hagiography – the anonymous Passion of Eustathius of Mtskheta (570s) and Ioane Sabanisdze's the Passion of Abo of Tbilisi (c. 790).

The earliest extant manuscript of the Life and Passion of Kostanti-Kakhay dates to the early 18th century. First published by Mikhail Sabinin in 1882, it has been translated into Latin (P. Peeters, 1925), Russian (N. Vachnadze and K. Kutsia, 1978), and English (M. Abashidze and S.H. Rapp, 2004).

== Biography ==
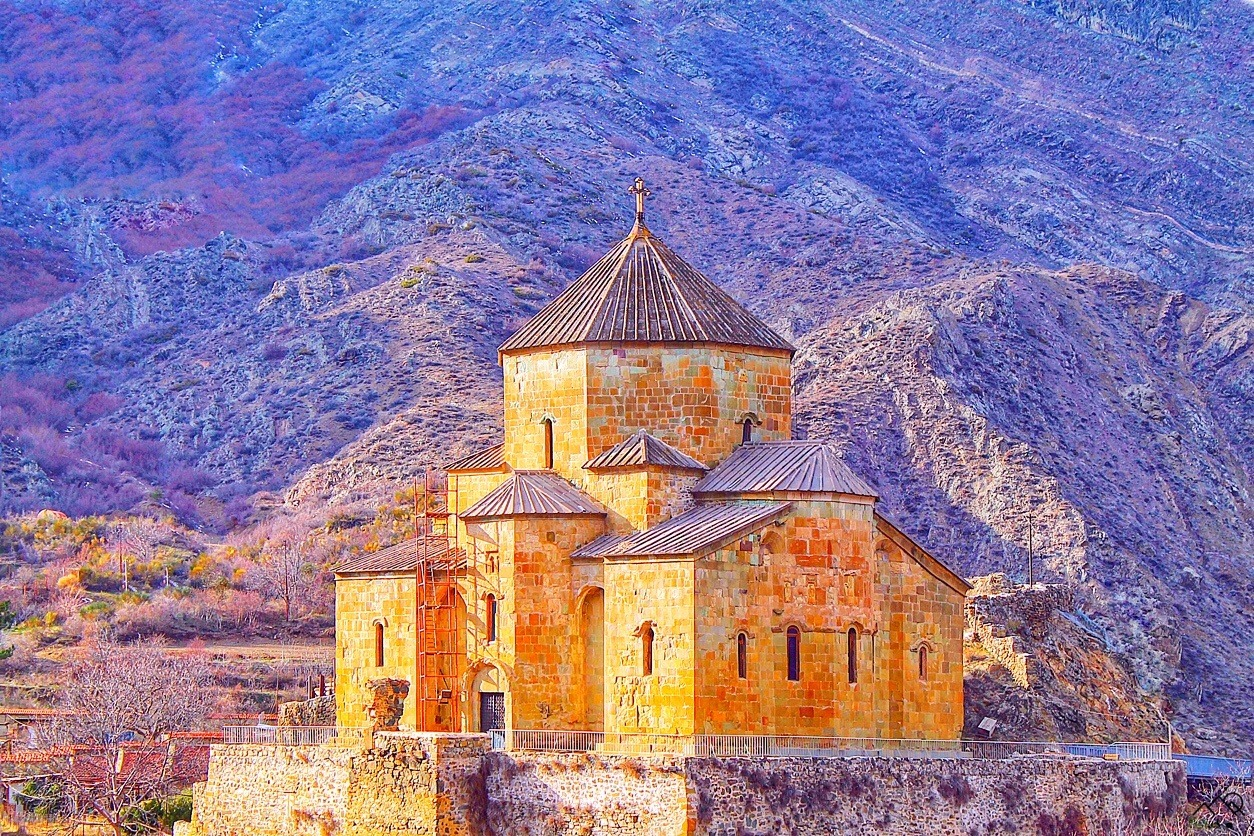
The Ateni Sioni church

According to the Life and Passion of Kostanti-Kakhay, Kostanti-Kakhay was born of a noble family of Kartli in 768. "Kakhay" is the sobriquet, indicating his origin from Kakheti. Kostanti amassed a considerable wealth and publicly professed Christianity at the time when the Abbasid political hegemony was strongly felt in the Georgian lands and an Arab emir sat at Tbilisi, the erstwhile capital of Kartli. He was respected for his generosity and pilgrimage and donations to Jerusalem. He was 85, when he was seized, as "a leader and the most noble man in all of Kartli", by Bugha, the Turkic commander of the Abbasid army in the Caucasus, and sent to the court of the caliph Al-Mutawakkil in Samarra. The seasoned captive rejected both offers of wealth in return of apostasy to Islam and threats of torture, remaining steadfast. Two noblemen (eristavi) from Somkhiti, who had agreed to convert to Islam, visited Kostanti in prison, first to persuade him and a second time to behead him; in both cases they failed. Then the caliph sent his own servant who put the defiant prisoner to death.

The Life and Passion of Kostanti-Kakhay ends with moralizing:

The transient warmth of the sun's orb did not seem sweet to him, he looked with indignation at the rising sun, its light was like a storm-cloud looming and for the love of Christ he spat out all of life's pleasures like the blood of [extracted] teeth in the great desire of his heart and the wisdom of his repudiation of deceit.

— Translated by D. Rayfield

== Further historical evidence ==
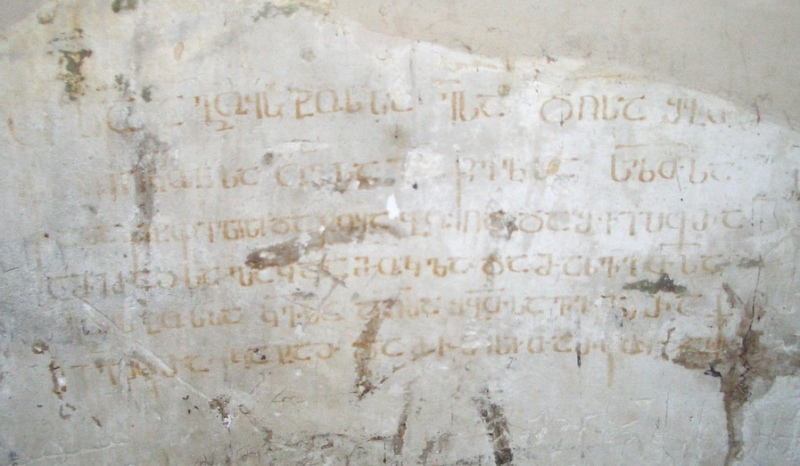
Ateni Sioni church inscription of 853, mentioning Kakhay (ႩႠႾႠჂ)

Kostanti's patristic biography is corroborated by a stone inscription in the Ateni Sioni church in Kartli, near Gori, which relates that "on August 5, a Saturday, in koronikon 73, the Islamic year 239, Bugha burnt the city of Tbilisi and captured the Emir Sahak and killed him. And also in August, on the 26th, on Saturday, Zirak took Kakha and his son Tarkhuji prisoner." The events described in this inscription were part of Bugha's Caucasian expedition, in the course of which he sacked Tbilisi and had its rebellious Muslim emir Ishaq ibn Isma'il ("Sahak" of the Georgian sources) executed. The Georgian nobles who sided with the emir were also punished in a series of reprisal raids commanded by Bugha and his lieutenant Zirak. Many captives were taken; some of them killed. The 9th-10th-century Armenian historian Tovma Artsruni, while recounting the same events in his History of the House of the Artsrunik', mentions the martyrdom of Kakhay, "of the upper land", and his companion Sevordi at the hands of the Muslims. Another Armenian historian of the early 10th century, Hovhannes Draskhanakertsi, refers to seven men martyred under Bugha in 302 of the Armenian era, which corresponds to the year of Kostanti's death.
