= Sosipater =

New Testament character

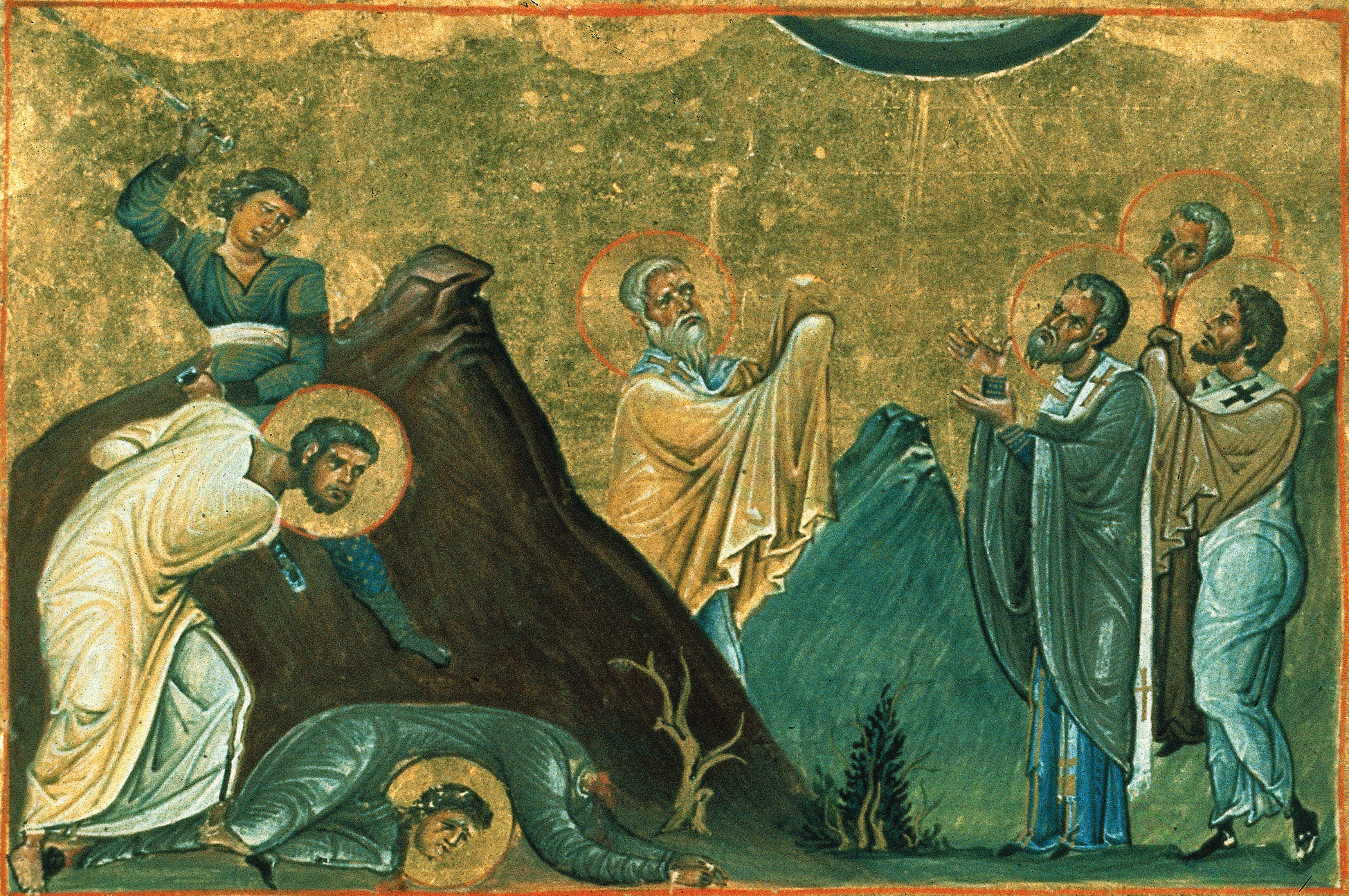
Erastus, Olympus, Rhodion, Sosipater, Quartus and Tertius (Menologion of Basil II)

Sosipater (Greek: Σωσίπατρος) is a person mentioned in the New Testament, in Romans 16:21. He is probably the same person as Sopater mentioned in Acts 20:4.

In church tradition, he is known as Sosipater of Iconium, and is numbered among the Seventy Apostles. St. Sosipater's feast days are on April 28 (Slavic tradition), or 29 (Greek tradition) with St. Jason; November 10 with saints Erastus, Olympas, Herodian, Quartus, and Tertius; and January 4 with the Seventy. According to Latin tradition, the disciple of St Paul the Apostle died on the 25th of June in Beroea.

== Legend ==
Sosipater was born in Achaea. According to legend, he was Bishop in Iconium (modern-day Konya, Turkey) (prior to the Apostle Tertius) by his relative the Apostle Paul. With the Apostle Jason he traveled to the island of Corfu where they built a church in honor of the Apostle Stephen the Protomartyr and converted many pagans to the Christian faith. Seeing this, the governor of Corfu threw them into prison where they converted seven other prisoners to the Christian faith: Saturninus, Jakischolus, Faustianus, Januarius, Marsalius, Euphrasius, and Mammius, known as the Seven Robbers. The governor had those seven put to death by boiling pitch for their faith.

The governor's daughter, the virgin Cercyra, having watched these holy apostles being tortured and turned to the Christian faith, distributed all her jewels to the poor. The governor became angry and put her in prison, yet she would not deny Christ. So he had the prison burned, but she remained unharmed. Many people were baptized upon seeing this miracle. He then had her killed with arrows while tied to a tree.

Many believers fled to a nearby island to get away from the enraged governor, but as he chased them his boat sank. The new governor embraced the Christian faith and in baptism received the name Sebastian. From then on Sts. Sosipater and Jason freely preached the Gospel and built up the Church in Corfu until a very old age, when they gave up their souls to God.

== Hymns ==
=== November 10 ===
Troparion (Tone 3)

Holy Apostles, Erastus, Olympas, Herodian, Sosipater, Quartus and Tertius,
entreat the merciful God,
to grant our souls forgiveness of transgressions.

Kontakion (Tone 2)

Illumined by divine light, O holy apostles,
you wisely destroyed the works of idolatry.
When you caught all the pagans you brought them to the Master
and taught them to glorify the Trinity.

=== April 28 ===
Troparion (Tone 3)

O holy Apostles Jason and Sosipater,
Pray to the merciful God,
That He may grant to our souls
Remission of our transgressions.

Kontakion (Tone 2)

O Jason, source of healing,
And Sosipater, glory of the martyrs of Christ:
You were enlightened by the preaching of Paul,
Both becoming a great consolation to the world through your miracles.
Thrice-holy and God-bearing Apostles and defenders of those who suffer,
Intercede with Christ God that He may save our souls.

== Sources ==
- St. Nikolai Velimirovic, The Prologue of Ohrid
- Martyrologium Romanum (for the Latin tradition)

This article is derived in whole or in part from Sosipater at OrthodoxWiki, which is dually licensed under CC-By-SA and GFDL. All relevant terms must be followed.
