= Tertius of Iconium =

Amanuensis for Paul the Apostle

Saint Tertius
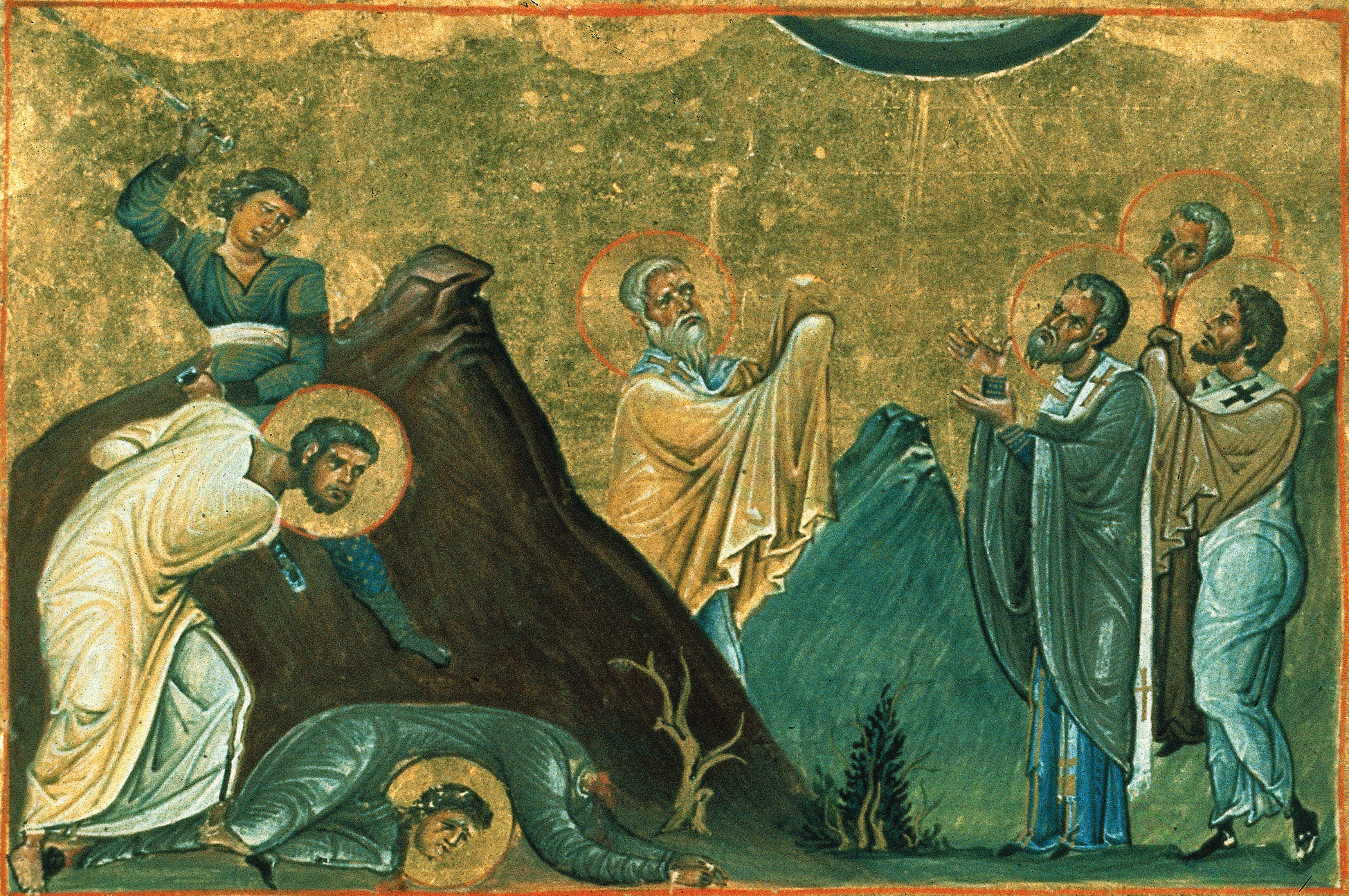
- Erastus, Olympus, Rhodion, Sosipater, Quartus and Tertius (Menologion of Basil II)

Hieromartyr Bishop of Iconium Apostle of the Seventy
- Born: 1st century Unknown
- Died: 1st century Iconium, Galatia, Roman Empire
- Venerated in: Eastern Orthodox Church; Roman Catholic Church
- Feast: June 21 (Orthodoxy); October 30 (both); November 10 (both)

According to the New Testament book of Romans, Tertius of Iconium (Greek: Τέρτιος Ἰκονιού) acted as an amanuensis for Paul the Apostle, writing down his Epistle to the Romans.

== Christian tradition ==
He is numbered among the Seventy Disciples in a list pseudonymously attributed to Hippolytus of Rome, which is found in the margin of several ancient manuscripts.

According to tradition, Tertius was Bishop in Iconium after Bishop Sosipater and died a martyr. The Catholic Church marks St. Tertius days on October 30 and November 10.

== Hymns ==
Troparion (Tone 3)

Holy Apostles, Erastus, Olympas, Herodian, Sosipater, Quartus and Tertius,
entreat the merciful God,
to grant our souls forgiveness of transgressions.

Kontakion (Tone 2)

Illumined by divine light, O holy apostles,
you wisely destroyed the works of idolatry.
When you caught all the pagans you brought them to the Master
and taught them to glorify the Trinity.

== Sources ==
- St. Nikolai Velimirovic, The Prologue from Ohrid
