= Erastus of Corinth =

One of the Seventy Disciples

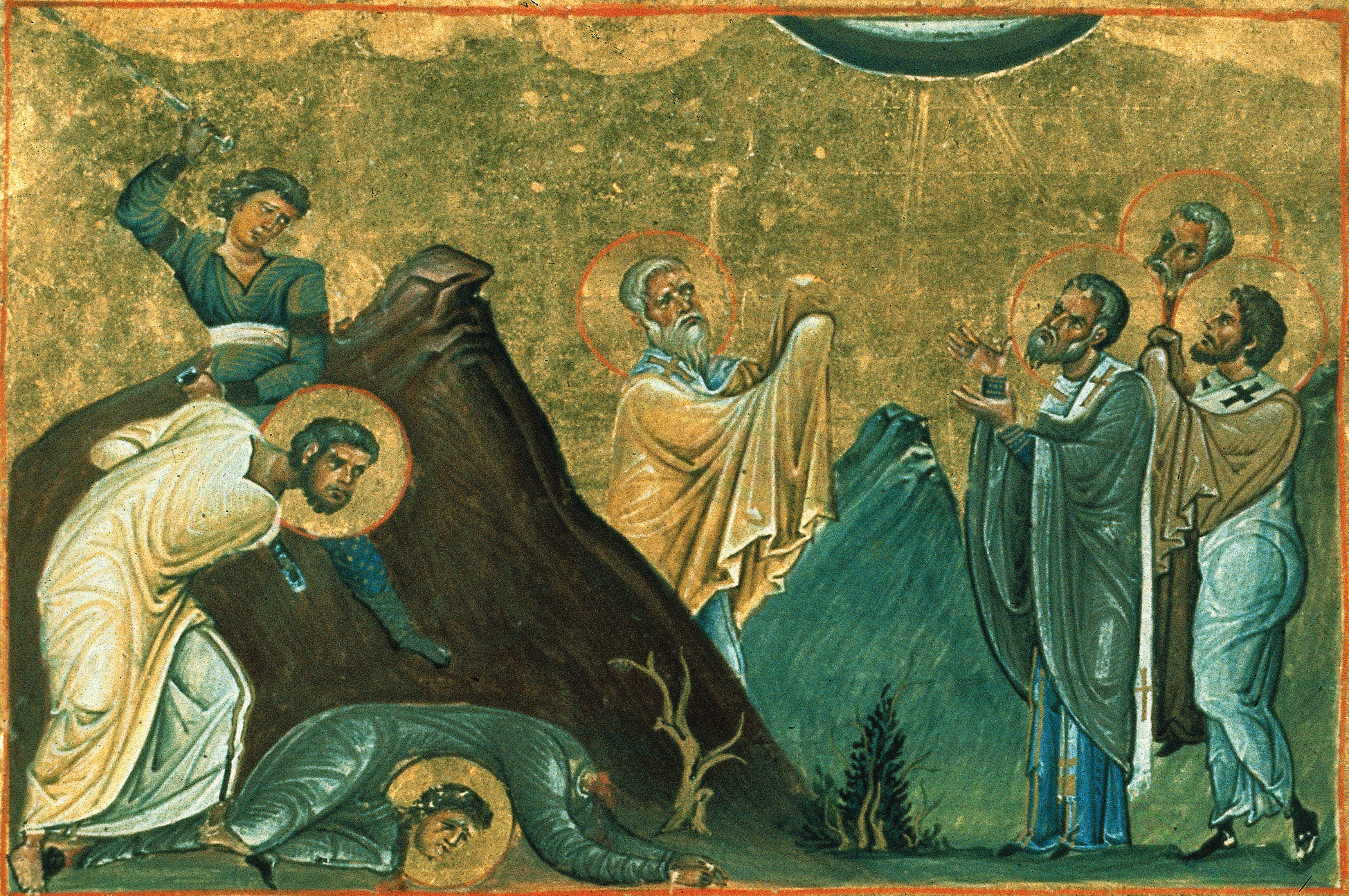
Erastus, Olympas, Rhodion, Sosipater, Quartus and Tertius (Menologion of Basil II)

Erastus of Corinth (Greek: Ἔραστος, Erastos), also known as Erastus of Paneas, held the political office of steward (Greek: οἰκονόμος, oikonomos), in Corinth, according to the Epistle to the Romans 16:23 of the New Testament. The office is defined as "the manager of household or of household affairs" or, in this context, "treasurer". The King James Version uses the translation "chamberlain", while the New International Version uses "director of public works". A person named Erastus mentioned in 2 Timothy 4:20 and Acts 19:22 is often taken to be the same person.

According to the tradition of the Eastern Orthodox Church, Erastus is numbered among the Seventy Disciples. He served as a deacon and steward of the Church at Jerusalem and later of Paneas in Palestine. The Church remembers St. Erastus on January 4 among the Seventy, on July 26 and on November 10.

However, researchers have also questioned whether it is even possible to conclude from the mention in the New Testament that Erastus was a Christian. According to this theory, he could also have been a wealthy patron of the church without being a believer himself.

== Relevant verses ==
And having sent into Macedonia two of his helpers, Timothy and Erastus, he himself stayed in Asia for a while.

— Acts 19:22

Gaius, who is host to me and to the whole church, greets you. Erastus, the city treasurer, and our brother Quartus, greet you.

— Romans 16:23

Erastus remained at Corinth, and I left Trophimus, who was ill, at Miletus.

— 2 Timothy 4:20 ESV

== Erastus inscription ==
In 1928/1929 and 1947, parts of an inscription mentioning an Erastus were found near a paved area northeast of the theater of Corinth. Its dating is disputed, but it is possible that the inscription dates from the middle of the 1st century. The text reads "Erastus in return for his aedileship paved it at his own expense." (Latin: ERASTVS. PRO. AED. S. P. STRAVIT abbreviated for ERASTUS PRO AEDILITATE SUA PECUNIA STRAVIT.) Following its excavator, T. Leslie Shear, some New Testament scholars have identified this aedile Erastus with the Erastus mentioned in the Epistle to the Romans, but this is disputed by others. This debate has implications relating to the social status of the members of the Pauline churches.

== Hymns ==
Troparion (Tone 3)

Holy Apostles, Erastus, Olympas, Herodion, Sosipater, Quartus and Tertius,
entreat the merciful God,
to grant our souls forgiveness of transgressions.

Kontakion (Tone 2)

Illumined by divine light, O holy apostles,
you wisely destroyed the works of idolatry.
When you caught all the pagans you brought them to the Master
and taught them to glorify the Trinity.

Source: St. Nikolai Velimirovic, The Prologue of Ohrid
