= Herodion of Patras =

Biblical figure and Catholic saint

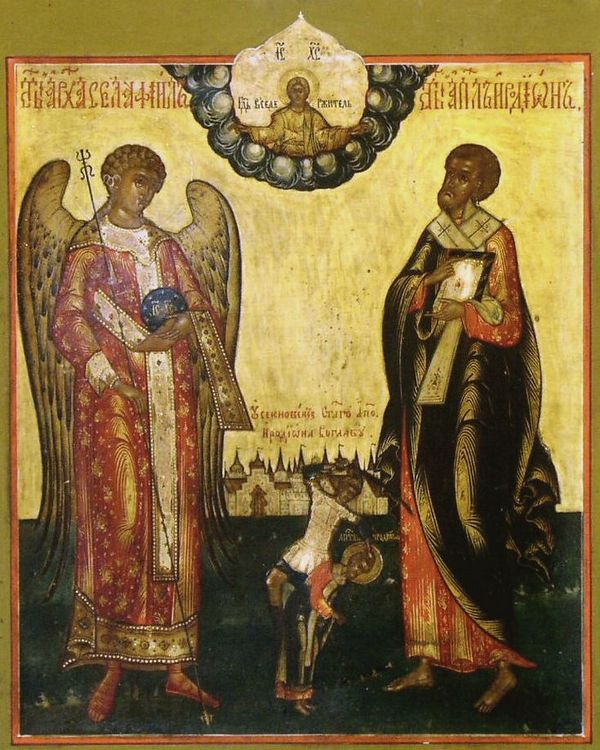
Herodion of Patras and Archangel Selaphiel (1840, Russia)

Herodion of Patras (also Herodian or Rodion; Greek: Ἡρωδίων, Ἡρωδιανός, Ῥοδίων) has been thought by some to have been a relative (συγγενής) of Saint Paul, as in a greeting Paul calls a Herodion a sungenēs in Romans 16:11. But Paul uses the term συγγενής (sungenēs) for fellow Jews in Romans 9:3. So συγγενής (sungenēs) can mean relative even as broadly as fellow Jew. According to tradition, Herodion of Patras was numbered among the Seventy Disciples and became bishop of Patras, where he suffered greatly. After beating, stoning, and stabbing him; they left him for dead, but St. Herodion arose and continued to serve the Apostles.

He was beheaded with Olympas in Rome on the same day that Saint Peter was crucified. His feast days are celebrated April 8, and November 10. He is also commemorated on January 4 with the other Seventy Apostles.

== Hymns ==
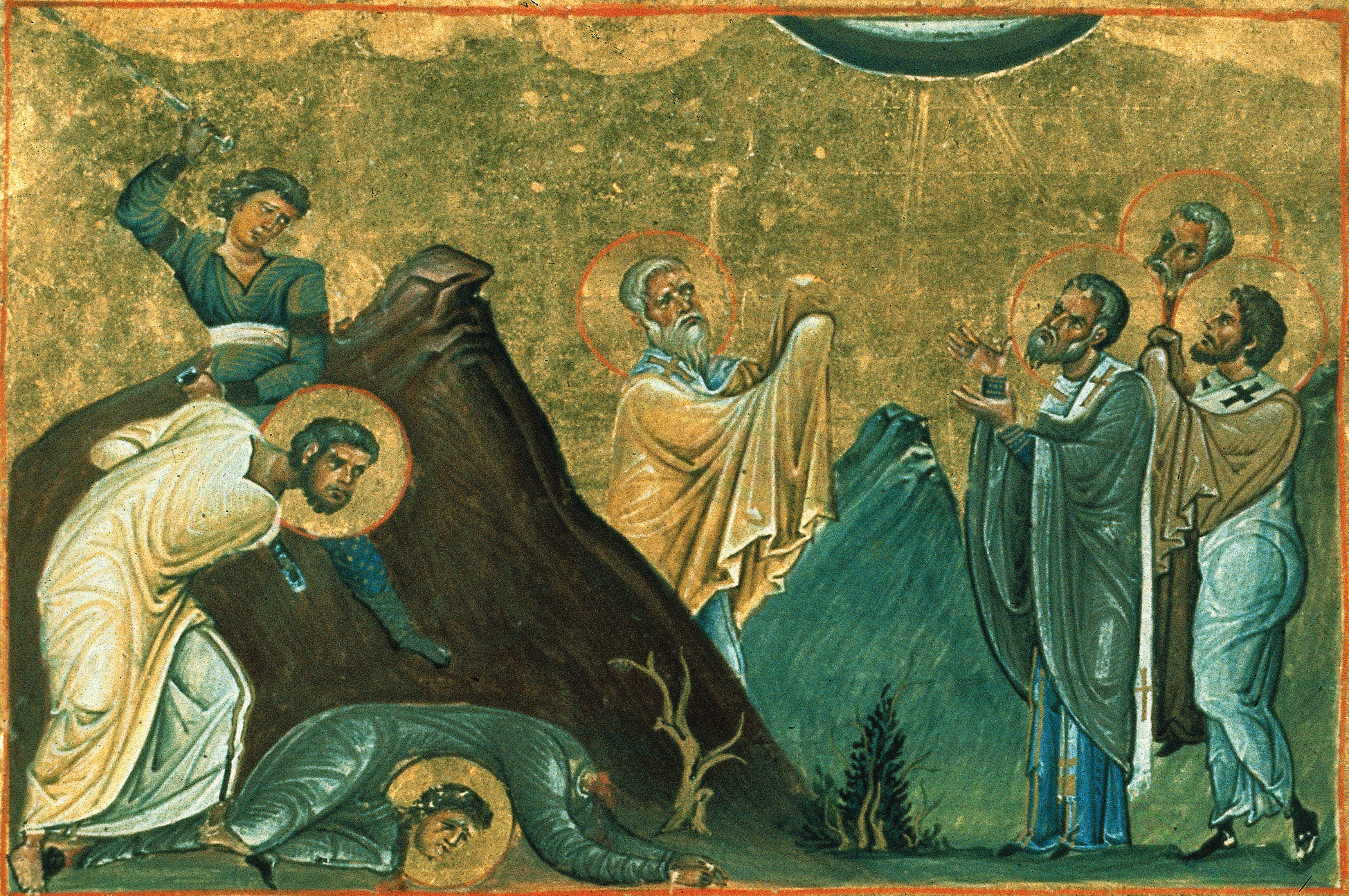
Erastus, Olympas, Herodion, Sosipater, Quartus and Tertius (Menologion of Basil II)

=== November 10 ===
Troparion (Tone 3)

Holy Apostles, Erastus, Olympas, Herodian, Sosipater, Quartus and Tertius,
entreat the merciful God,
to grant our souls forgiveness of transgressions.

Kontakion (Tone 2)

Illumined by divine light, O holy apostles,
you wisely destroyed the works of idolatry.
When you caught all the pagans you brought them to the Master
and taught them to glorify the Trinity.

=== April 8 ===
Troparion (Tone 1)

Let us praise in hymns the six–fold choir of Apostles:
Herodion and Agabus,
Rufus, Asyncritus, Phlegon and holy Hermes.
They ever entreat the Trinity for our souls!

Kontakion (Tone 2)

You became the disciples of Christ
And all-holy Apostles,
O glorious Herodion, Agabus and Rufus,
Asyncritus, Phlegon and Hermes.
Ever entreat the Lord
To grant forgiveness of transgressions
To us who sing your praises.

Kontakion (Tone 4)

Like stars, O holy Apostles,
You illumine the way of the faithful with the light of the Holy Spirit.
You dispel the darkness of error as you gaze on God the Word!

== Sources ==
- St. Nikolai Velimirovic, The Prologue from Ohrid

This article incorporates text from Apostle Herodian at OrthodoxWiki which is licensed under the CC-BY-SA and GFDL.
