= Olympas =

Biblical figure and Catholic saint

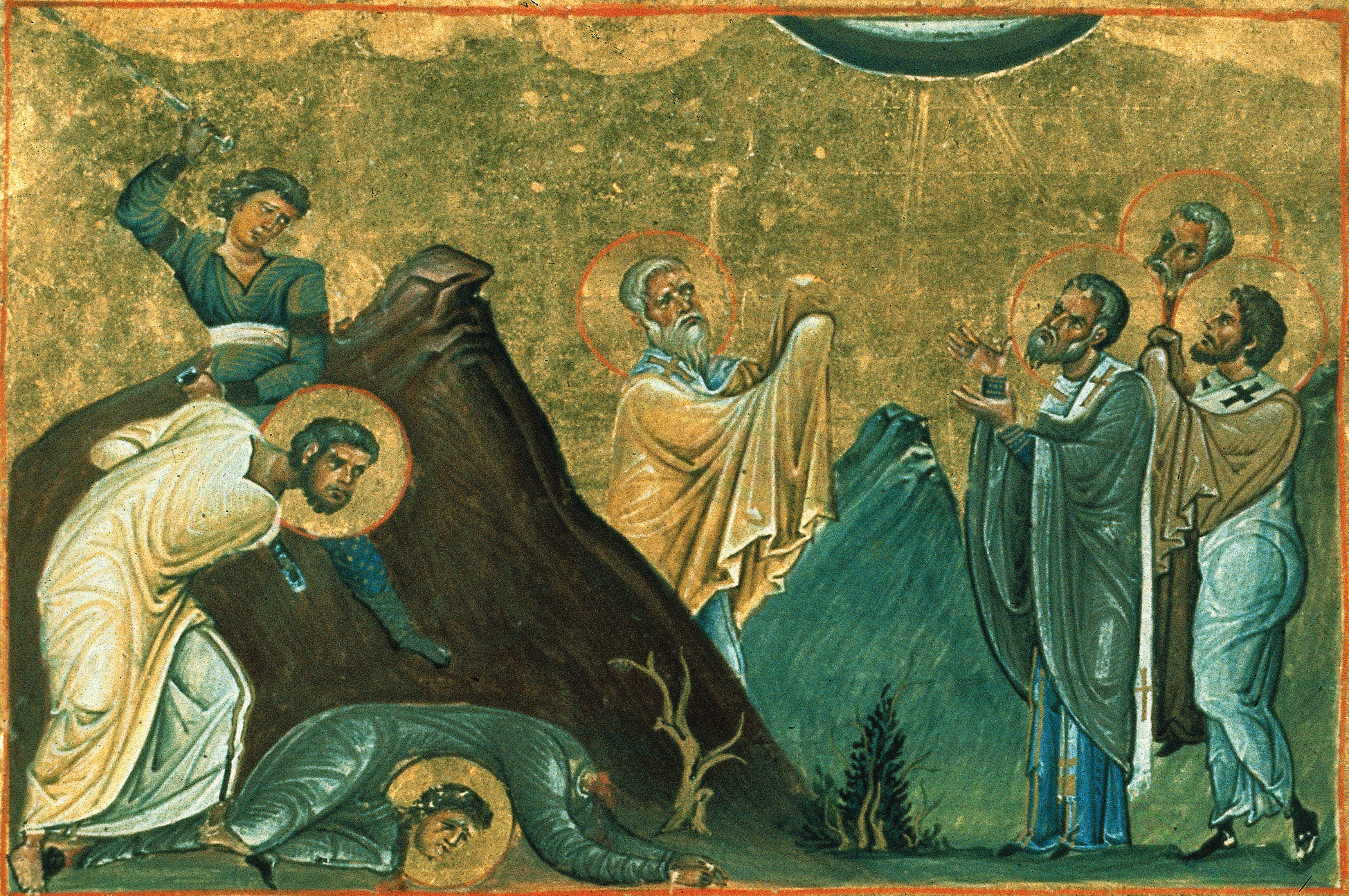
Erastus, Olympas, Rhodion, Sosipater, Quartus and Tertius (Menologion of Basil II)

Olympas (Greek: Ὀλυμπᾶς, meaning "heavenly") was a Roman Christian whom Paul of Tarsus saluted (Romans 16:15) in around 65 AD.

Olympas is regarded in the Eastern Orthodox Church as being one of the Seventy disciples. His feast day is November 10.
