= Prologue from Ohrid =

Eastern Orthodox devotional book

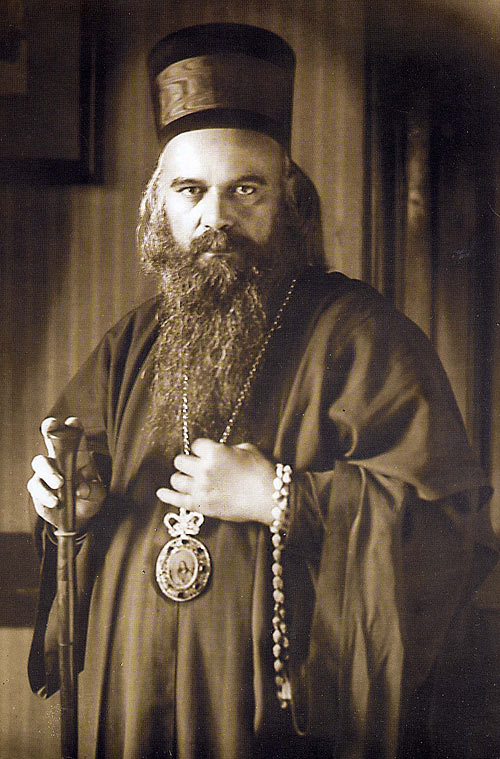
Saint Nikolai Velimirovic, author of the Prologue from Ohrid

The Prologue from Ohrid was compiled by Saint Nikolai Velimirovic (1881–1956).

Bishop Nikolai's work is a compilation of lives of saints, hymns, reflections, and homilies. It was originally written in Serbian.

== Published editions ==
- Velimirovic, Nikolai. The Prologue from Ohrid: Lives of Saints, Hymns, Reflections and Homilies for Every Day of the Year.

Volume I (ISBN 0971950504)
Volume II (ISBN 0971950512)

- Bishop Nikolai Velimirovic. Prologue from Ochrid [sic]. Lazarica Press (ISBN 0948298030)
