= May 13 (Eastern Orthodox liturgics) =

Day in the Eastern Orthodox liturgical calendar

Eastern Orthodox liturgical calendar
May 12	May 13	May 14
May 13 O.S. ≍ May 26 N.S. May 13 N.S ≍ April 30 O.S.

An Eastern Orthodox cross

May 13 in Eastern Orthodox liturgical calendars is a feast day and a day of commemoration of saints and martyrs. Although some Orthodox churches use the Revised Julian Calendar and others use the traditional Julian calendar, the fixed commemorations for their respective May 13 are broadly the same, no matter which calendar is used. (Note: Despite the dates being the same, the days to which they refer typically differ by 13 days. The notation Old Style or O.S. is sometimes used to indicate a date in the traditional Julian Calendar (the "Old Calendar"). The notation New Style or N.S. indicates a date in the Revised Julian calendar (the "New Calendar").)

== Saints ==
- Virgin-martyr Glyceria at Heraclea, Propontis (c. 138-161)
- Martyr Laodicius, jailer of Saint Glyceria (c. 138-161)
- Saint Theoctistus, monk from Tekoa, Palestine. (Note: There is another Saint "Theoctistus of Palestine" (+451) commemorated on September 3; and, a Saint "Theoctistus of Sicily" (+800) commemorated on January 4.)
- Saint Pausicacus, Bishop of Synnada (606)
- Saint Nicephoros, Presbyter of the monastery of Ephapsios. (Note: The Codex Athous Lavrensis (8th/9th century) states that St, Nicephorus was the Igumen of the Monastery of Ephapsios, and reposed in peace.)
- Saint Sergius (George) the Confessor of Constantinople, with his wife Irene and children (c. 829-842)
- Saint Euthymius the New (the Illuminator) (1028), founder of Iveron Monastery, and his fellow Georgian saints of Mount Athos:

- His father monk-martyr John of Iveron (998); his cousin monk-martyr George of Iveron (1065); and monk-martyr Gabriel of Iveron (10th century)

== Pre-Schism Western saints ==
- Saint Abbán of Ireland, baptized in 165 AD, missionary in Abingdon, Oxfordshire (2nd century)
- Martyr Alexander of Rome (284-305)
- Saint Valerian of Auxerre, third Bishop of Auxerre in France, and defender of Orthodoxy against Arianism. (350)
- Saint Onesimus of Gaul, fifth Bishop of Soissons in France (361)
- Saint Servatius, Bishop of Tongres, defender against Arianism in the Netherlands (384)
- Saint Agnes of Poitiers, chosen by St. Radegund to be Abbess of Holy Cross at Poitiers in France (588)
- Saint Mael (Mahel), Ascetic on the Isle of Bardsey (6th century)
- Saint Natalis (Natale), Bishop of Milan in Italy (751)
- Saint Anno (Hanno, Annon), Bishop of Verona in Italy (780)
- Saint Merwenna of Rumsey (Merwinna, Merewenna), first Abbess of Rumsey convent, in Hampshire (c. 970) (Note: Under her direction the monastery prospered and attracted princesses, including Saint Ethelfleda (Elfleda, c. 970, (Oct 23), daughter of Earl Ethelwold), who became a nun there and eventually abbess after St Merewenna.) (see also: February 10)
- Blessed Fortis Gabrielli, Ascetic (1040)

== Post-Schism Orthodox saints ==
- Saint Euthymius, Patriarch of Jerusalem (1084)
- Venerable monk-martyrs of Iveron Monastery, martyred by the Latins (c. 1259-1280) (Note: The Crusaders demanded that the Iveron monks convert to Catholicism and acknowledge the primacy of the Roman pope. But the monks condemned their fallacies and anathematized the doctrine of the Catholics. According to the Patericon of Athos, the Iveron monks were forcibly expelled from their monastery. Nearly two hundred elderly monks were goaded like animals onto a ship that was subsequently sunk in the depths of the sea. The younger, healthier monks were deported to Italy and sold as slaves to the Jews. Some sources claim this tragedy took place in the year 1259, while others record that the Georgian monks of the Holy Mountain were subject to the Latin persecutions over the course of four years, from 1276 to 1280.)
- Saint Macarius, Abbot of Glushitsa Monastery, Vologda (1480) (Note: See: The Monk Makarii of Glushitsk. HOLY TRINITY RUSSIAN ORTHODOX CHURCH (A parish of the Patriarchate of Moscow).)
- Righteous Virgin Glyceria of Novgorod (1522) (Note: See: (in Russian) Гликерия Новгородская. Википедии. (Russian Wikipedia).)
- Blessed Ana, mother of St. Basil of Ostrog (17th c.) (Note: Saint Ana (Anastasia) (16th–17th c.) of Popovo Polje, a widow from the Vasojević tribe, was the virtuous and deeply pious mother of St. Basil of Ostrog who experienced miraculous appearances of the Most Holy Theotokos, practiced constant prayer and humility, and assisted the elderly and sick in her community.)
- Saint Euphrosynus of Iveron (18th century)

=== New martyrs and confessors ===
- Hieromartyrs Basil Sokolov, (Note: See: (in Russian) Соколов, Василий Александрович (священномученик). Википедии. (Russian Wikipedia).) Alexander Zaozersky, (Note: See: (in Russian) Заозерский, Александр Николаевич. Википедии. (Russian Wikipedia).) and Christopher Nadezhdin, Archpriests (1922)
- Hieromartyr Macarius Telegin, Hieromonk (1922) (Note: See: (in Russian) Макарий (Телегин). Википедии. (Russian Wikipedia).)
- Martyr Sergius Tikhomirov, of Moscow (1922)
- New Hieromartyr Risto (Stevanov) Jaramaz, Priest of Kosijerevo, Montenegro (1942) (Note: Father Risto was martyred on St. John's Day, January 20, 1942. The Serbian name "Risto" (Ристо) is the South Slavic equivalent of the Greek name "Christos" (Χρήστος). They share the exact same root and meaning. In neighbouring Bulgaria and North Macedonia, it is often spelled "Hristo" (Христо).) (see also: January 7 - O.S., repose)
- Synaxis of the 103 New Hieromartyrs of Cherkasy (20th century)

== Other commemorations ==
- Consecration of the Monastery of Panagia Pantanassa (Most-Holy Queen of All), on the small island of Hagia Glykeria (Incirli Adasi, in the Bay of Tuzla) (12th century)
- Translation of the relics (1688) of Hieromartyr Saint Macarius, Archimandrite of Ovruch and Pinsk, from Kaniv to Pereyaslavl (1678) (Note: See: Transferred the Relics of the MonkMartyr Makarii, Archimandrite of Kanevsk. HOLY TRINITY RUSSIAN ORTHODOX CHURCH (A parish of the Patriarchate of Moscow).)
- Birth of righteous Priest Alexis of Bortsurmany, disciple of St. Seraphim of Sarov (1762; †1848).
- Repose of Rassophore Monk John, of St. Nilus of Sora Monastery (1863)
- Repose of Eldress Sepfora of Klykovo (1997)

== Icon gallery ==
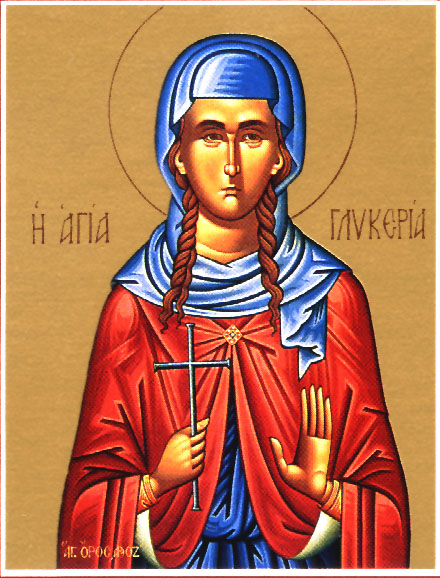
St. Glyceria.

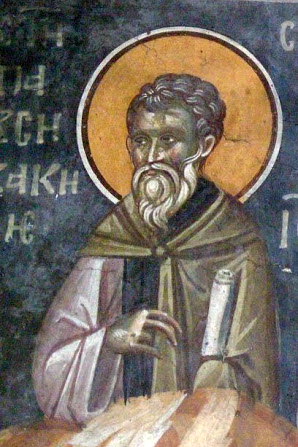
St. Pausicacus, Bishop of Synnada.

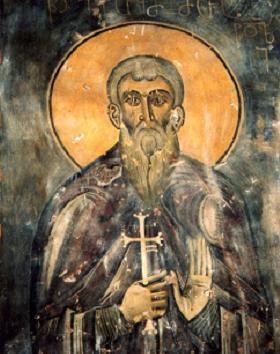
St. Euthymius of Athos

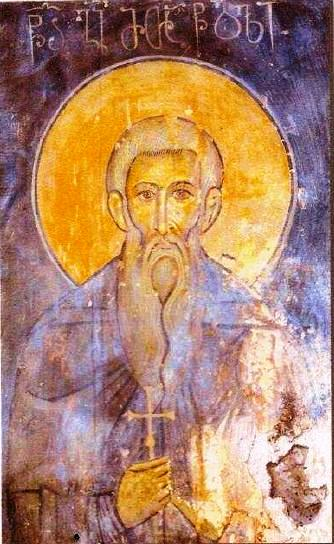
St. George the Hagiorite.

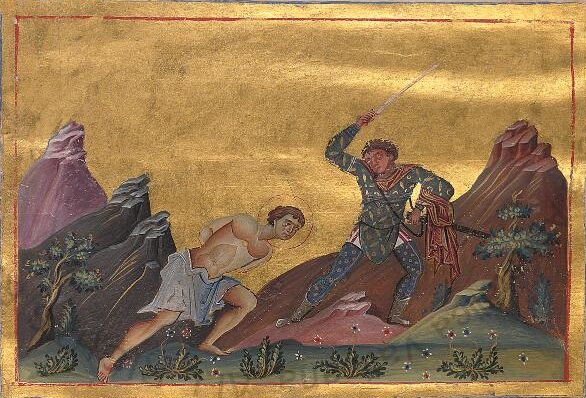
Martyr Alexander of Rome.

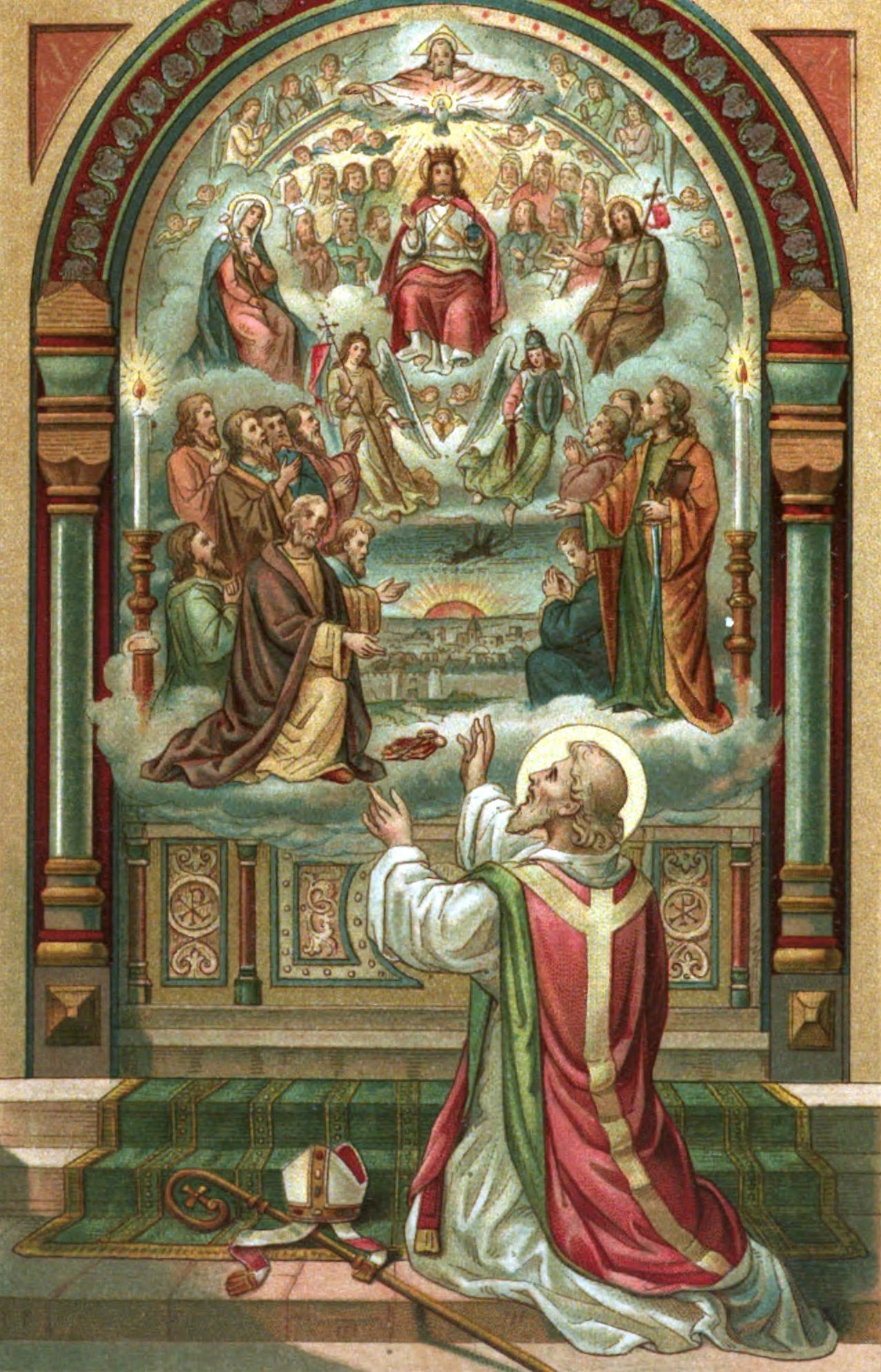
St. Servatius, Bishop of Tongres.

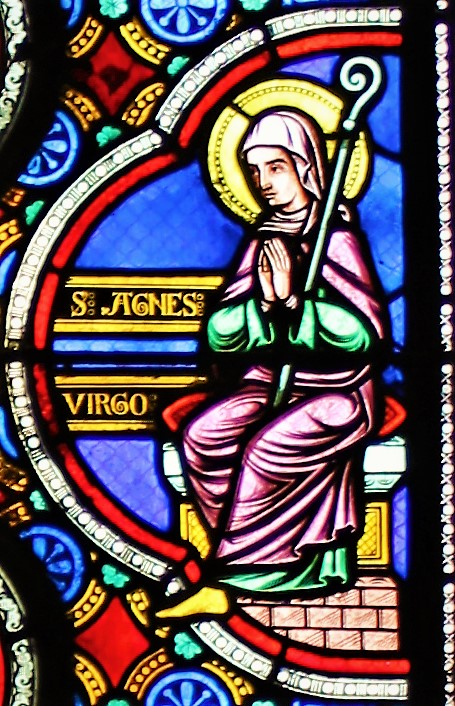
St. Agnes of Poitiers.

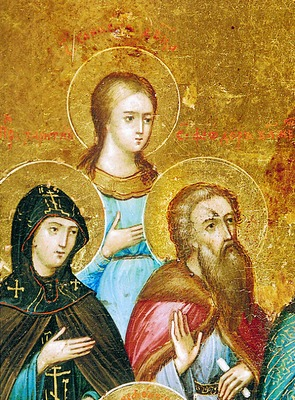
Righteous Virgin Glyceria of Novgorod (center).

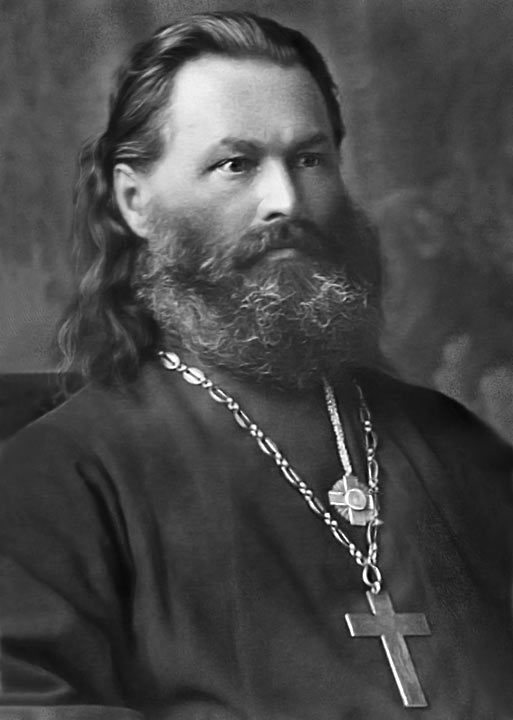
Hieromartyr Basil Sokolov, Archpriest.

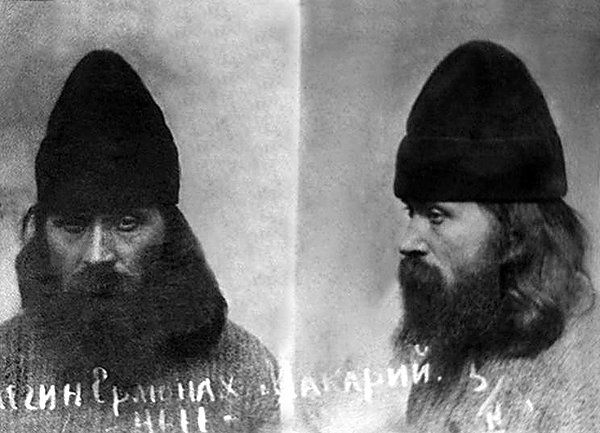
Hieromartyr Macarius Telegin, Hieromonk.

== Sources ==
- May 13/26. Orthodox Calendar (PRAVOSLAVIE.RU).
- May 26 / May 13. HOLY TRINITY RUSSIAN ORTHODOX CHURCH (A parish of the Patriarchate of Moscow).
- May 13. OCA - The Lives of the Saints.
- May 13. Latin Saints of the Orthodox Patriarchate of Rome.
- May 13. The Roman Martyrology.

Greek Sources

- Great Synaxaristes: (in Greek) 13 ΜΑΪΟΥ. ΜΕΓΑΣ ΣΥΝΑΞΑΡΙΣΤΗΣ.
- (in Greek) Συναξαριστής. 13 Μαΐου. ECCLESIA.GR. (H ΕΚΚΛΗΣΙΑ ΤΗΣ ΕΛΛΑΔΟΣ).

Russian Sources

- (in Russian) 26 мая (13 мая). Православная Энциклопедия под редакцией Патриарха Московского и всея Руси Кирилла (электронная версия). (Orthodox Encyclopedia - Pravenc.ru).
- (in Russian) 13 мая (ст.ст.) 26 мая 2013 (нов. ст.). Русская Православная Церковь Отдел внешних церковных связей. (DECR).
