= Arsen Ninotsmindeli =

Georgian calligrapher (died 1082)

Arsen Ninotsmindeli (Georgian: არსენ ნინოწმინდელი) (died 1082) was a Georgian bishop, scholar, monk, translator and famous calligrapher of the 11th century. He is a saint of the Georgian Orthodox Church.

Arsen became a monk in Jerusalem. He was active at the Otkhta monastery of Tao-Klarjeti. After learning about him John the Iberian and Euthymius of Athos invited Arsen to the Georgian Iviron monastery of Mount Athos.

Arsen died on Mount Athos. He was buried next to Euthymius by George the Hagiorite.
