= October 18 (Eastern Orthodox liturgics) =

Day in the Eastern Orthodox liturgical calendar

Eastern Orthodox liturgical calendar
October 17	October 18	October 19
October 18 O.S. ≍ October 31 N.S. October 18 N.S ≍ October 5 O.S.

An Eastern Orthodox cross

October 18 in Eastern Orthodox liturgical calendars is a feast day and a day of commemoration of saints and martyrs. Although some Orthodox churches use the Revised Julian Calendar and others use the traditional Julian calendar, the fixed commemorations for their respective October 18 are broadly the same, no matter which calendar is used. (Note: Despite the dates being the same, the days to which they refer typically differ by 13 days. The notation Old Style or O.S. is sometimes used to indicate a date in the traditional Julian Calendar (the "Old Calendar"). The notation New Style or N.S. indicates a date in the Revised Julian calendar (the "New Calendar").)

== Saints ==
- Holy Apostle and Evangelist Luke (1st century) (Note: Name days celebrated today include: Luke, Lucas, Loukas (Λουκᾶς).) (Note: "THE birthday of blessed Luke, evangelist, who, after having suffered much for the name of Christ, died in Bithynia, filled with the Holy Ghost. His relics were taken to Constantinople, and thence conveyed to Padua.")
- Hieromartyr Mnason of Cyprus, Bishop, by the sword (1st century)
- Holy 40 children-martyrs, by the sword.
- Hieromartyr Cyriacus (Kyriakos), Chorepiscopus of Jerusalem (c. 363) (Note: Cyriacus of Jerusalem's listing in the "Dictionary of Christian Biography" (1877) matches the account in the "Great Synaxaristes" very closely: "Commemorated in the Menologium of Basil II as a man of Jerusalem, who discovered the True Cross, and showed it to Helena, and was thereby converted, and became Patriarch of Jerusalem; and was martyred along with his mother by Julian the Apostate, his right hand being first cut off because his writings had made so many converts. He is unknown to history."; Not to be confused with: Cyriacus the Anchorite (+557), September 29) (see also: October 28 )
- Martyr Marinus the Elder, at Anazarbus (4th century)
- Venerable Julian the Hermit (Julian Sabas)), of the Euphrates, in Mesopotamia (4th century) (Note: "In Mesopotamia, on the bank of the Euphrates, St. Julian, hermit.")
- Venerables Symeon and Theodore of Thessaloniki, founders of the Mega Spilaion Monastery in Kalavryta, and Euphrosyne the shepherdess who found the Icon of the Mother of God, Wonderworkers (4th century) (Note: These details are according to the Acolouthia of these Saints, published in Venice in 1706 AD, and in Athens in 1840 AD and in 1911 AD.)

== Pre-Schism Western saints ==
- Saint Justus of Beauvais, a child-martyr aged nine, he was venerated in Beauvais in France (287) (Note: "In the diocese of Beauvais, St. Justus, martyr, who, being but a boy, was put to death in the persecution of Diocletian, under the governor Rictiovarus.")
- Saint Tryphonia, a widow martyred in Rome (3rd century) (Note: "At Rome, St. Tryphonia, at one time wife of the Caesar Decius. She was buried in a crypt, near St. Hippolytus.") (Note: "The Acts say that Decius the Emperor and Valerian the Prefect, when condemning SS. Laurence and Hippolytus, were possessed with devils. Valerian gave a great howl, and died on the spot; but Decius lingered on three days. This so moved Tryphonia, his wife, that she was baptized along with her daughter Cyrilla, and died next day. The Roman Martyrology does not insert the whole of this nonsense, but confines itself to this statement: "At Rome, S. Tryphonia, wife of Decius Caesar, who was buried in the crypt of S. Hippolytus." The wife of Decius, however, was Herennia Cupressenia Etruscilla. The relics of this saint were translated by Pope Paul I.)
- Saint Gwen (Candida or Blanche), a holy woman murdered by heathen in Talgarth in Wales, daughter of St. Brychan (492)
- Saints Gwen (Wenna) and Selevan (Saloman), martyred Welsh missionaries, in Brittany (5th century) (Note: Sister of St Nonna and aunt of St David of Wales. She is also said to have been the mother of Sts Cyby and Cadfan.)
- Saints Brothen and Gwendolen (6th century) (Note: St Brothen is the patron-saint of Llanfrothen in Wales. Dolwyddelan and Llanwyddelan are named after St Gwendolen.) (Note: ["Memorial of Anc. British Piety, or a British Martyrology," London, 1761, gives on this day, "In Wales the festival of S. Gwendoline, abbess, in whose honour several churches have been dedicated. Also, the memory of S. Brothen, venerated in the parish of Llanfrothen, in the county of Merioneth." Sir Harris Nicolas, in his "Chronology of History," gives them on Oct. 15.]: "Of these saints nothing is known. Dr. Rees gives the day of S. Gwyddelan as August 22. Two churches are dedicated to her, Llanwyddelan, in Montgomeryshire, and Dolwyddelan, in Carnarvonshire. And Dr. Rees also gives October 15 th as the festival of S. Brothen, founder of Llanfrothen.")
- Saint Monon, hermit in the Ardennes (c. 645) (Note: Born in Scotland, he lived as a hermit in the Ardennes. He was murdered by evildoers in Nassogne in Belgium.)
- Saint James the Deacon, companion of St Paulinus of York in his mission to Northumbria (after 671) (Note: "This eminent man, greatly commended for his ecclesiastical spirit and holy life, was the attendant deacon of St. Paulinus, Archbishop of York. When the Saint was obliged to return to Kent, in company with Queen Ethelburga, JAMES was left behind with the Northumbrian neophytes. He remained faithfully at his post throughout the troublous times which followed, and was able to teach and baptise many new converts. So great was the veneration in which his memory was held, that the place of his usual residence was called by his name. He was a steady observer of the disciplinary usages, which he had brought from Kent, and a skilful teacher of the Roman Church chant. James had the consolation of living to witness the restoration of Christianity in his adopted country, and was spared for many years for the service of God and the advantage of the faithful.") (Note: ["Memorial of British Piety," 1761, on this day. Not mentioned, however, in any other Martyrology, and probably arbitrarily introduced into that one.]: "S. James was the brave Italian deacon who remained at York after S. Paulinus had deserted the scene of his labours. He kept together a little band of Christians at York through the stormy days of invasion by Penda and the Mercians. King Edwin had been slain in the battle of Hatfield, October 11th, 633; his eldest son fell with him; the younger, taken prisoner by Penda, who swore to preserve his life, was infamously murdered. Northumbria was ravaged with fire and sword, and its recent Christianity completely obliterated, except for the little remnant which clustered round the gallant deacon at York. Paulinus had fled, taking the widow of King Edwin, the gentle Ethelburga, to her brother, the King of Kent. James lived to see Northumbria submitting to Oswald, who brought Aidan from Iona to reconvert the country to Christ.") (see also: August 17 )

== Post-Schism Orthodox saints ==
- Saint David of Serpukhov, Abbot (1520)
- New Martyrs Gabriel and Cirmidol, of Egypt (1522)
- New martyr Chryse (Zlata) of Meglen (1795) (see also: October 13 )
- Saint Peter of Montenegro, Metropolitan of Cetinje (1830)
- New Hieromartyr Isidore, and his two children George and Irene, martyred under the Ottomans, newly revealed in 1953.

=== New Martys and Confessors ===
- New Hieromartyrs Andrey Voskresensky, (Note: See: (in Russian) Воскресенский, Андрей Владимирович (протоиерей). Википедии. (Russian Wikipedia).) Sergius Bazhanov, Nicholas Sokolov (Note: See: (in Russian) Соколов, Николай Александрович (священномученик). Википедии. (Russian Wikipedia).) and Sergius Gusev, Priests (1937)
- Virgin-martyr Elizabeth Krymova (1937)

== Other commemorations ==
- Synaxis of the Icon of Panagia of Machairas Monastery (Panagia Machairiotissa) in Cyprus, one of the 70 icons of her written by the Apostle Luke.
- Translation of the relics (2001) of Venerable Joseph of Volokolamsk (1515), founder of Volokolamsk Monastery.
- 1997 slaying of José Muñoz Cortés (in monasticism, Monk Ambrose), guardian of the myrrh-streaming "Montreal" copy of the Panagia Portaitissa icon
- Glorification of Venerable Saint Niphon (Ionescu) of Prodromou Skete, Hieroschemamonk, founder of the Romanian Skete of Prodromou on Mount Athos (1899 or 1901) (Note: He was glorified by the Ecumenical Patriarchate on October 18, 2025. The official communiqué of the Ecumenical Patriarchate was as follows: (in Greek) Τό Ἱερόν Σῶμα ἀπεφάσισεν ὁμοφώνως, κατόπιν αἰτήματος τοῦ Μακ. Πατριάρχου Ρουμανίας κ. Δανιήλ, τήν κατάταξιν εἰς τό ἁγιολόγιον τῆς Ἐκκλησίας τῶν ἐν Ἄθωνι ἀσκησάντων ὁσιακῆς βιοτῆς Ἱερομονάχου Νήφωνος Ionescu Προδρομίτου (1799-1899) καί Μοναχοῦ Νεκταρίου Cretu (Πρωτοψάλτου) (1804-1899).)

== Icon gallery ==
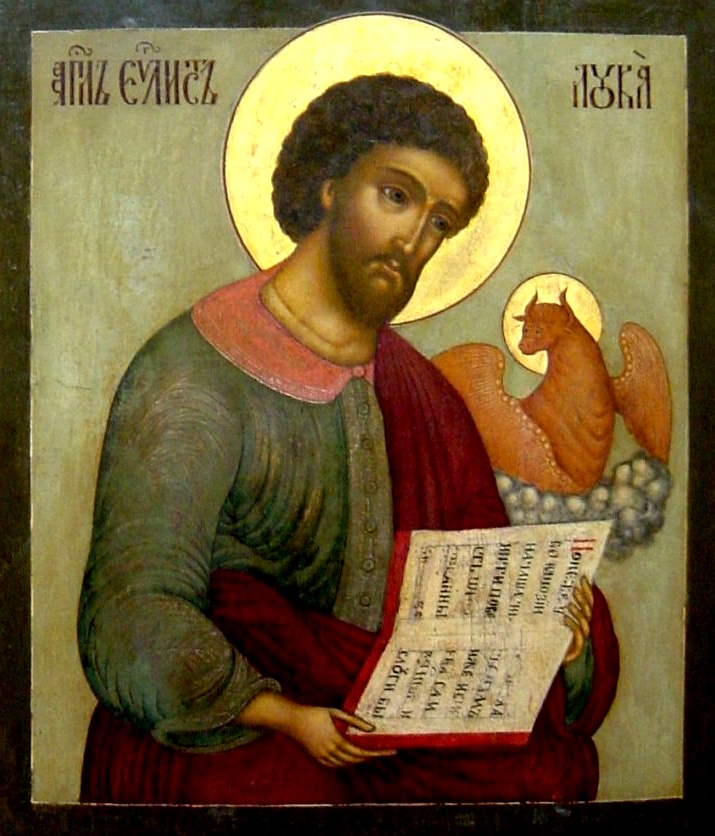
Apostle and Evangelist Luke.

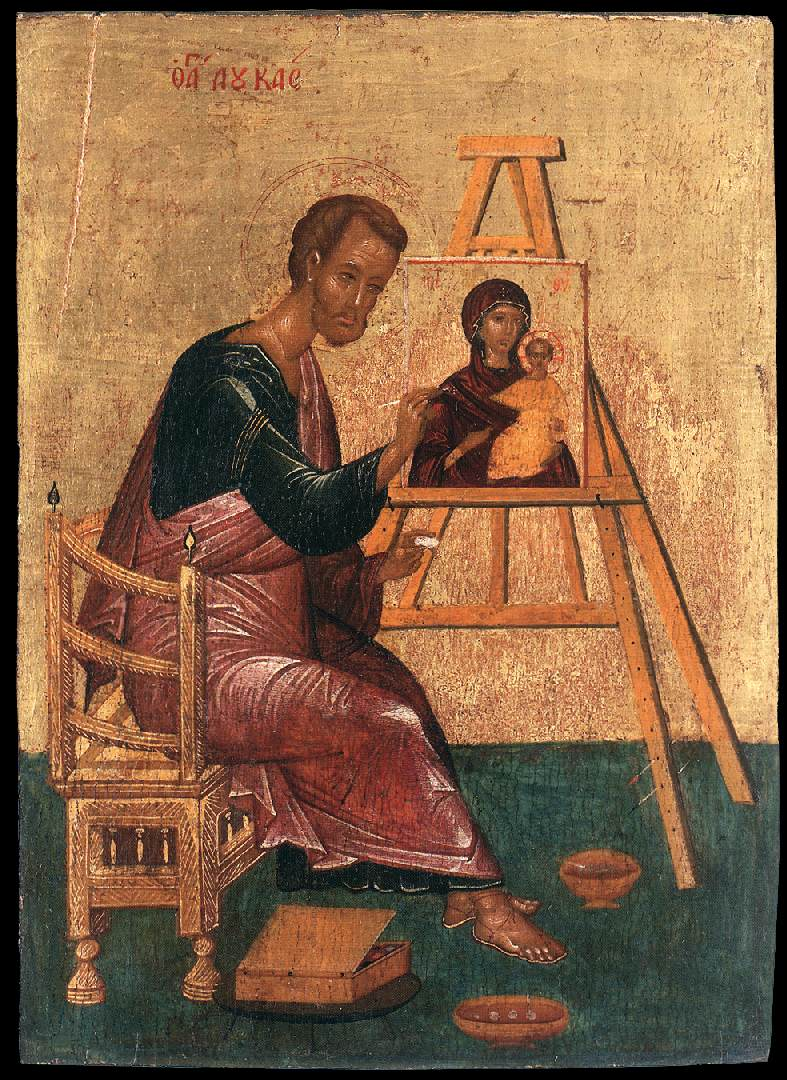
Saint Luke Painting the Blessed Virgin.

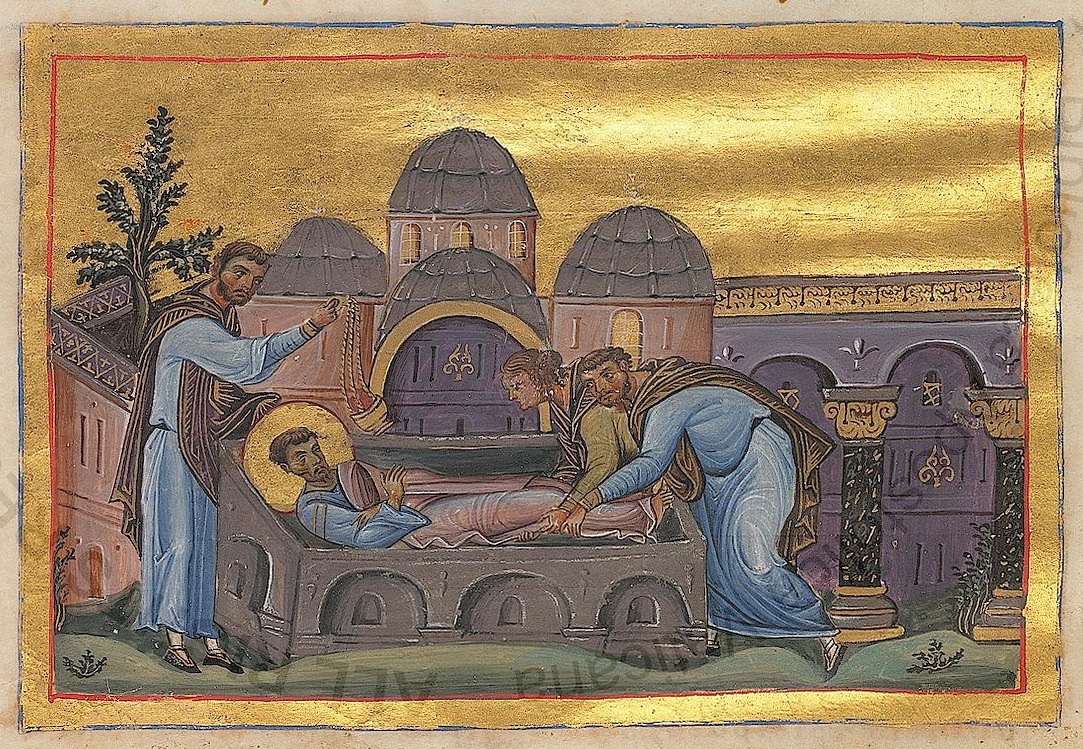
Dormition of Luke the Evangelist.
(Menologion of Basil II, 10th century).

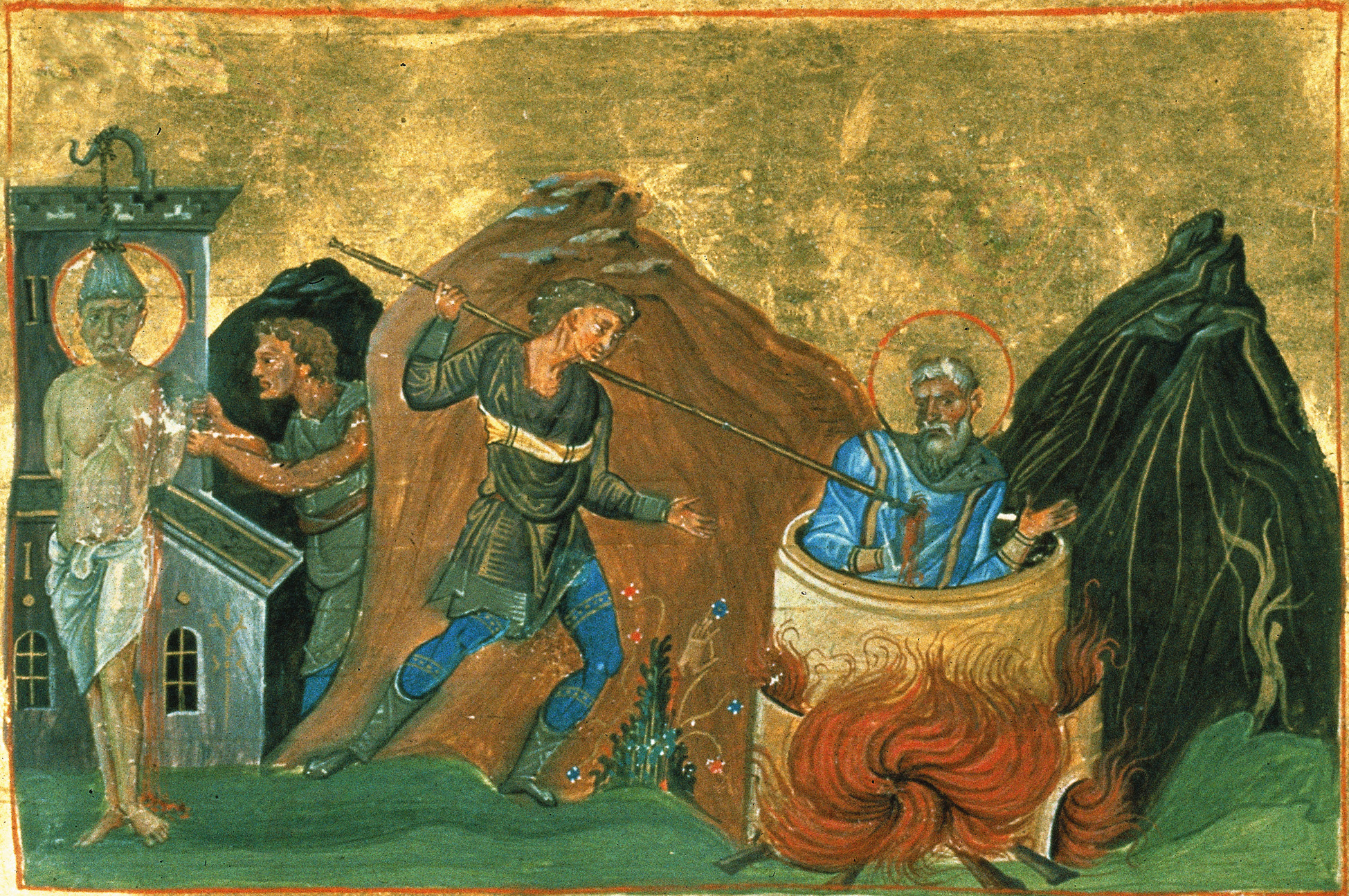
The martyrdom of Cyriacus (Kyriakos), Chorepiscopus of Jerusalem.
(Menologion of Basil II, 10th century).

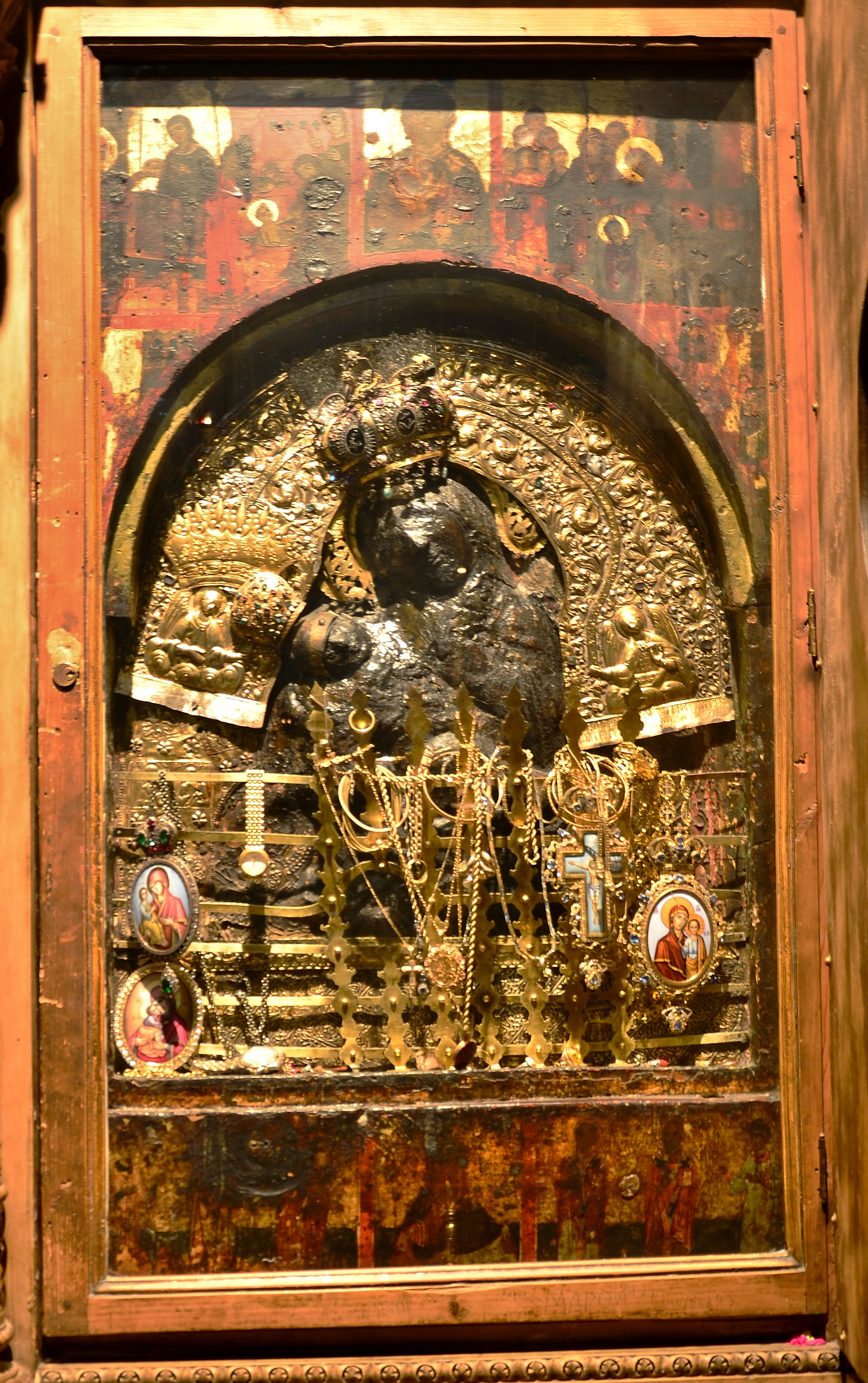
Panagia Megaspilaiotissa, at Mega Spilaion Monastery in Kalavryta, Greece.

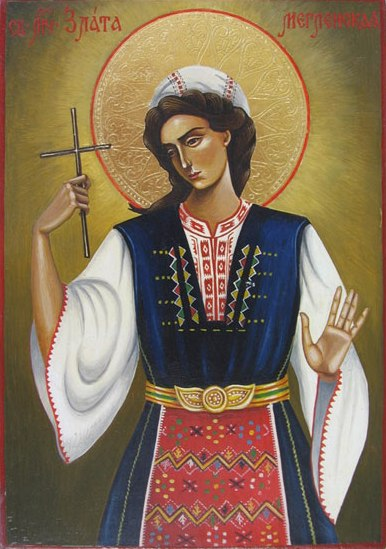
New martyr Chryse (Zlata) of Meglin.

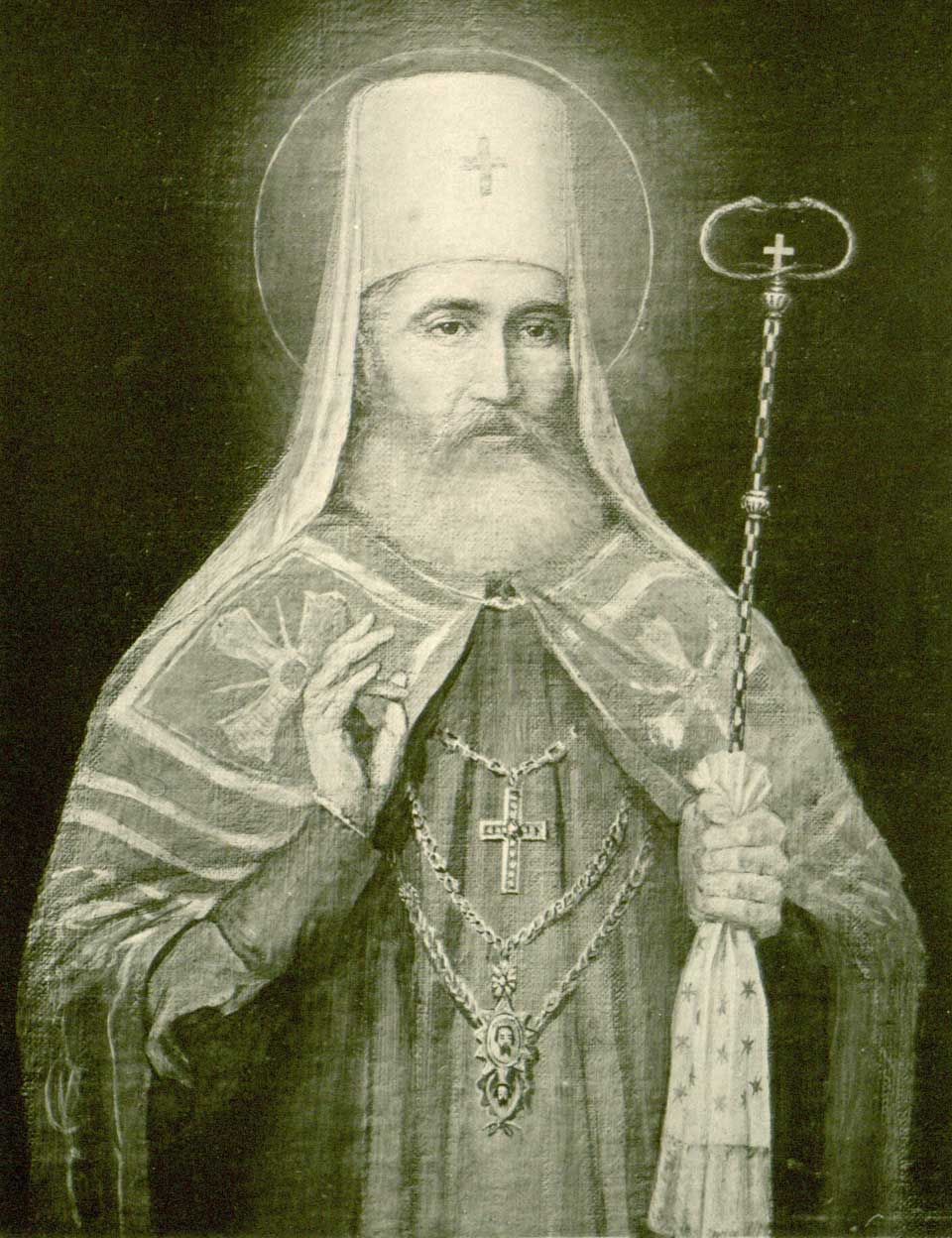
St.Peter of Montenegro, Metropolitan of Cetinje.

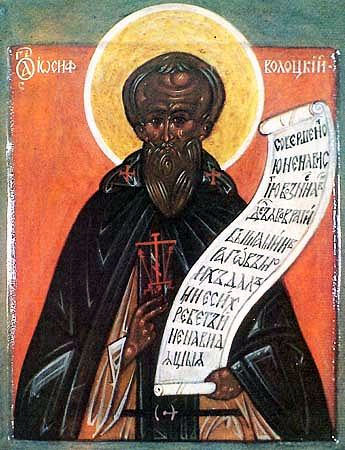
Venerable Joseph of Volokolamsk.

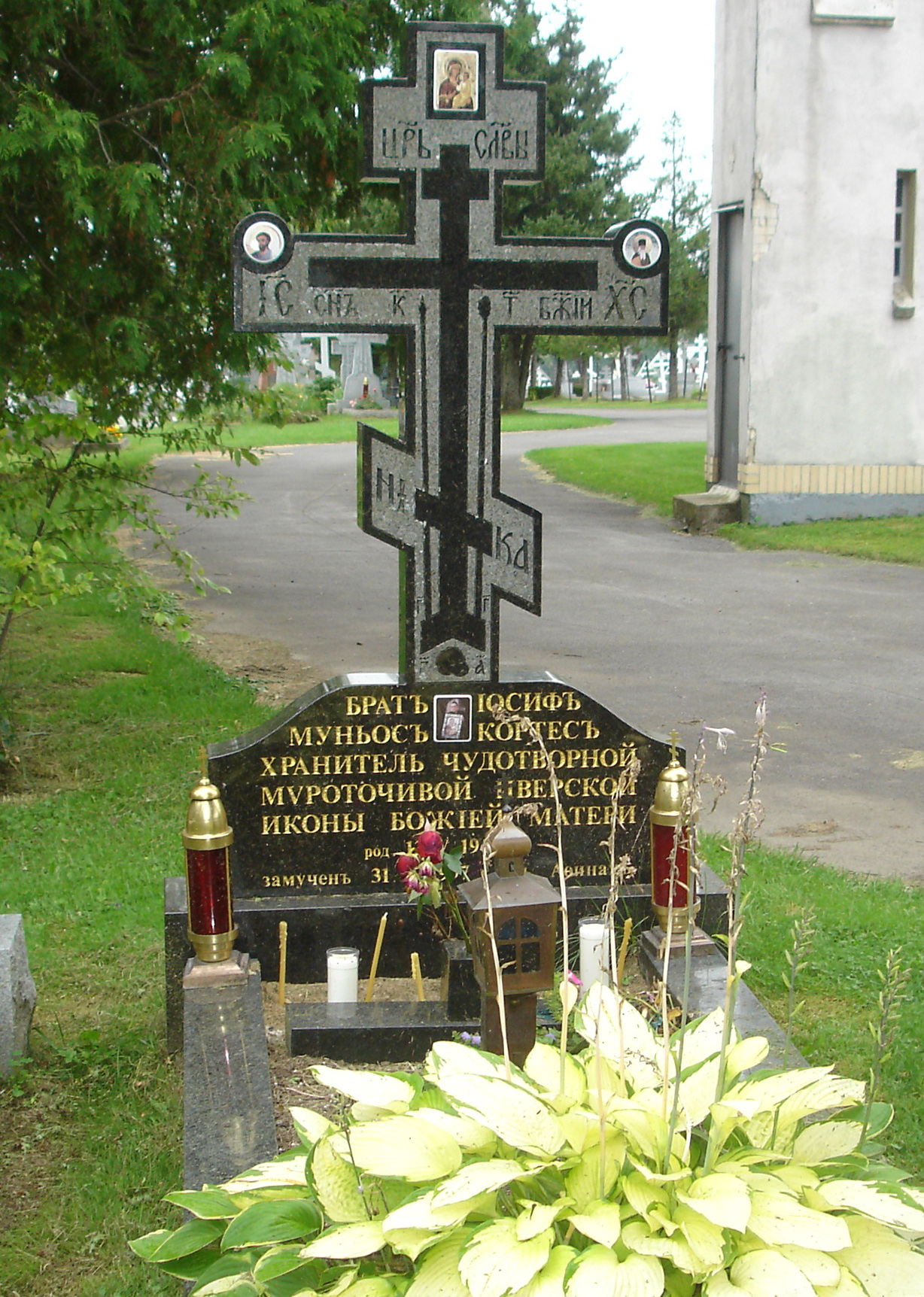
The grave of Brother José Muñoz Cortés, keeper of the Iveron-Montreal Icon of the Theotokos.

== Sources ==
- October 18/31. Orthodox Calendar (PRAVOSLAVIE.RU).
- October 31 / October 18. HOLY TRINITY RUSSIAN ORTHODOX CHURCH (A parish of the Patriarchate of Moscow).
- October 18. OCA - The Lives of the Saints.
- The Autonomous Orthodox Metropolia of Western Europe and the Americas (ROCOR). St. Hilarion Calendar of Saints for the year of our Lord 2004. St. Hilarion Press (Austin, TX). p. 77.
- The Eighteenth Day of the Month of October. Orthodoxy in China.
- October 18. Latin Saints of the Orthodox Patriarchate of Rome.
- The Roman Martyrology. Transl. by the Archbishop of Baltimore. Last Edition, According to the Copy Printed at Rome in 1914. Revised Edition, with the Imprimatur of His Eminence Cardinal Gibbons. Baltimore: John Murphy Company, 1916. pp. 321–322.
- Rev. Richard Stanton. A Menology of England and Wales, or, Brief Memorials of the Ancient British and English Saints Arranged According to the Calendar, Together with the Martyrs of the 16th and 17th Centuries. London: Burns & Oates, 1892. pp. 502–503.

Greek Sources

- Great Synaxaristes: (in Greek) 18 ΟΚΤΩΒΡΙΟΥ. ΜΕΓΑΣ ΣΥΝΑΞΑΡΙΣΤΗΣ.
- (in Greek) Συναξαριστής. 18 Οκτωβρίου. ECCLESIA.GR. (H ΕΚΚΛΗΣΙΑ ΤΗΣ ΕΛΛΑΔΟΣ).
- (in Greek) 18/10/2017. Ορθόδοξος Συναξαριστής.

Russian Sources

- (in Russian) 31 октября (18 октября). Православная Энциклопедия под редакцией Патриарха Московского и всея Руси Кирилла (электронная версия). (Orthodox Encyclopedia - Pravenc.ru).
- (in Russian) 18 октября по старому стилю / 31 октября по новому стилю. Русская Православная Церковь - Православный церковный календарь на 2016 год.
