= Gabriel the Iberian =

Georgian Monk

Saint Gabriel the Iberian
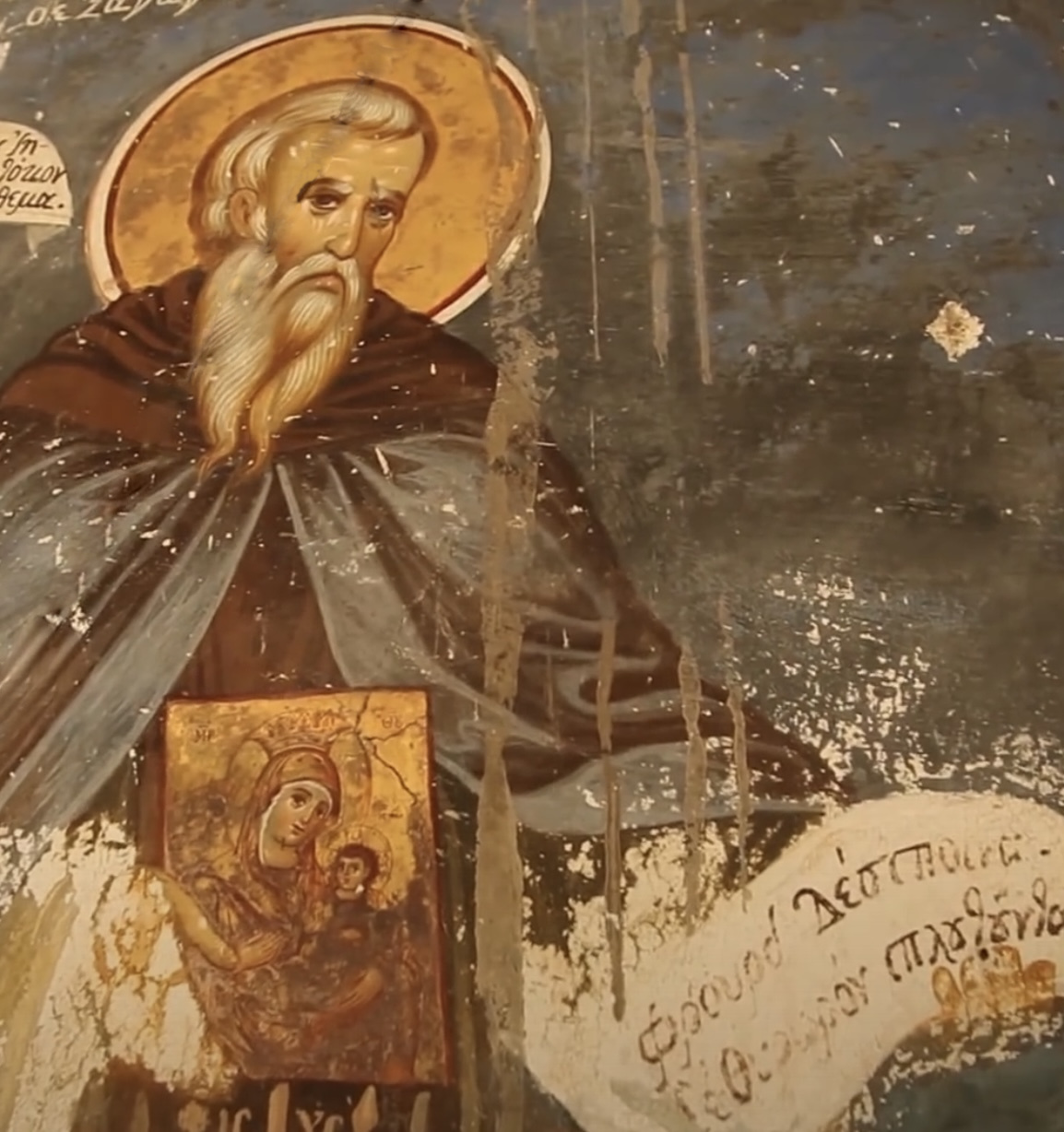
- Gabriel the Iberian holding the Panagia Portaitissa, fresco from the Monastery of Iviron

Athonite Father
- Born: Kingdom of the Iberians
- Died: c. 10th century Mount Athos
- Venerated in: Eastern Orthodox Church
- Major shrine: Monastery of Iviron
- Feast: May 13
- Patronage: Georgia; Mount Athos

Gabriel the Iberian (Georgian: გაბრიელ ქართველი, romanized: gabriel kartveli) (c. 10th century) was a Georgian Eastern Orthodox monk from the Iviron Monastery on Mount Athos, who is revered as a saint. His feast day is celebrated by the Georgian Orthodox Church, Greek Orthodox Church on July 12/25 and by the Romanian Orthodox Church on May 13. His name refers to his origins from the Kingdom of Iberia.

== Life ==
Gabriel became a monk at the Georgian monastery of Iviron on Mount Athos and lived there during the period when the monastic community was led by another Georgian saint, John the Iberian. Gabriel led strictly religious and rough life: he wore clothes made of animal hair, drank only water and remained silent most of the time, avoiding talking about worldly subjects and talking only about spiritual issues and God. Eager for solitude, he retired in the summer to the wild mountains around the monastery, where he lived in a cave, while in winter he would come back to the monastery.

The most famous event in Gabriel's life was the finding of the icon Panagia Portaitissa which, according to Vita, he took out of the sea when he was already elderly. The saint's hagiographies mention that several Athonite monks saw the icon floating upright on the sea, "in a pillar of fire", and when they approached by boat the icon moved away from them. The monks prayed to the Mother of God, the protector of Mount Athos, and after three days of prayer, the monk Gabriel had a vision in which the Mother of God told him that he was the only monk worthy to take the icon out of the water. Obeying the command of the Mother of God, Gabriel would have descended to the shore of the sea and "stepped on the water like dry land", bringing the icon to shore and then to the Iviron monastery. The emerging monks brought the icon with great honor to their monastery and placed it on the altar, but the icon was found the next day on the gate wall. Believing that one of the monks had taken her out of the church, the monks brought the icon back to the altar, but the icon was found the next day in the same place above the gate, and this event was repeated several times. The Mother of God appeared again to Gabriel and told him not to bring the icon to the monastery, as was the custom, but to place it above the entrance gate of the monastery. This is why the icon is referred as "doorkeeper/gatekeeper" (i.e. Portaitissa). Gabriel died at the end of the 10th century and was revered as a saint by the Georgian and other Orthodox monks. An akathist dedicated to the pious Gabriel was written by a Georgian monk from the monastery in the early 19th century.

== Bibliography ==
- Walsh, Michael (2007). A New Dictionary of Saints. Liturgical Press. ISBN 978-0-8146-3186-7.
- Charkiewicz, Jarosław (2005). Gruzińscy święci. Warszawa: Warszawska Metropolia Prawosławna. ISBN 83-920093-7-1.
- Grdzelidze, Tamar (2009). Georgian monks on Mount Athos: two eleventh-century lives of the Hegoumenoi of Iviron. Bennett & Bloom. ISBN 978-1-898948-04-9.
