= Athonite =

Athonite, "of/from/related to Athos", may refer to:

- Athanasius the Athonite
- Euthymius the Athonite
- George the Athonite
- John the Athonite
- Silouan the Athonite
- Simon the Athonite
