= Pavsikakiy =

- Gender: Male

Origin
- Origin: Slavic
- Region of origin: Russia, Belarus, Ukraine

Other names
- Related names: Pavsekakiy, Povsikakiy, Povsekakiy, Pausicacus

Pavsikakiy (Russian: Павсикáкий) is a Christian male given name used in Slavonic countries, such as Russia, Belarus and Ukraine, although its use has declined in modern times.

== Etymology ==
The name Pavsikakiy derives from the 6th-century saint Pausicacus of Synada. The name is of Greek origin, παυσίκακος, formed from the words παῦσις (pavsis) «to stop, to cease» and κακία (kakia) «evil, misfortune»; it means literally «he who stops evil».

== Spelling ==
Cyrillic spelling in Russian is Russian: Павсикакий, romanized: Pavsikakiy or Russian: Павсекакий, romanized: Pavsekakiy, while in Belarusian it is Belarusian: Паўсекакий, romanized: Pawsikakiy and in Ukrainian it is Ukrainian: Павсекакій, romanized: Pavsekakiy.

== Nameday ==
Name-day is in 26 May.

== People ==
Famous people:

- Pausicacus of Synada (Pavsikakiy Sinadsky) is a Christian saint, monk, ascetic, a bishop of Sinadsky church in Syria.
- Pavsekakiy Bogdanov is a Kursk healer, diviner and astrologist, who has become famous by helping TV-stars of Russian show business.
