= Pavsekakiy Bogdanov =

Russian folk healer, astrologer and magician

- Russian: Павсекáкий Богдáнов
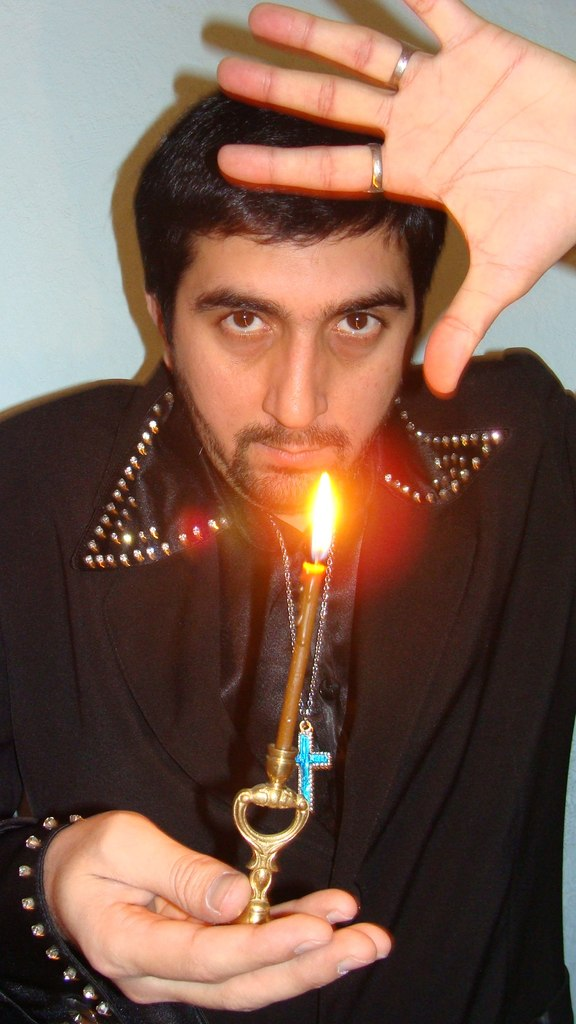
- Pavsekakiy Bogdanov 2011
- Born: Viktor Konstantinovich Bogdanov; 17 June 1981 (age 45); Grozny, Chechen-Ingush ASSR, Soviet Union
- Education: Kursk State Medical University
- Occupations: broadcaster, journalist and producer folk healer, astrologer and magician
- Website: http://www.pavsekakii.ru

Viktor Konstantinovich Bogdanov (Russian: Виктóр Константѝнович Богдáнов; born 17 July 1981), more commonly known as Pavsekakiy Bogdanov (Russian: Павсекáкий Богдáнов) is a Russian broadcaster, journalist, producer, healer, astrologer and magician.

He became a resident expert on spirituality and astrology in the major Russian TV channel (TV-3, REN TV, Channel One, Domashny, NTV, Rossiya 1).

== Early life and education ==
Pavsekakiy Bogdanov was born on 17 July 1981 in Grozny, Chechen-Ingush ASSR, USSR.

In September 1988, he began going to school in his home city. Due to the First Chechen War, however, his family moved to Kursk (Russian Federation) in 1993, where Bogdanov finished high school. In 1997, he studied College of Medicine, Faculty of Medical Business at the Kursk State Medical University, and he successfully completed in 2003.

== Career ==
Bogdanov began working in 2002, when he became a broadcaster in the local TV Company (TNT-Kursk, TV-6).

During this time, Bogdanov revealed in one of the local newspapers that he belongs to the hereditary Caucasian healers and almost all his ancestors in male line engaged in healing and sorcery. In fact, he had been engaged in sorcery since school years. Back then, he called himself Pavsekakiy, or "to stop evil", which originated from the Old Greek words παῦσις (pavsis) which means "to stop, to cease", and κακία (kakia) which means "evil, misfortune". It was also the name of St. Pavikakiy of Sinnada, Bogdanov's patron saint.

For many years, Bogdanov combined his work as a journalist and a producer in the media, and worked as an astrologist where he came in contact with Russian TV stars such as Irina Allegrova, Alla Pugacheva, Larisa Dolina, Nikolai Baskov and Phillip Kirkorov, who are all believed to be his regular customers.

== Predictions ==
According to media reports made in July 2012, Pavsekakiy predicted that members of feminist punk rock band Pussy Riot, which organized their unauthorized performance in The Cathedral of Christ the Saviour and were accused in hooliganism, would be convicted and get real jail time.

In December 2012, Bogdanov predicted that the end of the world will not be on 21 December, but on the night of 14 to 15 February 2013 during which a small meteorite would fall to Earth. Although the end of the world did not happen, the meteorite really did fall in Chelyabinsk the night of 14 to 15 February.

He also predicted the future of Prince George of Cambridge the newborn heir and son of William, Prince of Wales and Kate Middleton, that he will become the last king of Great Britain. In his prediction, the heir will go in for sports, particularly football, he will finish two education, and at 30, he will become a king. He stated: "He will reign about 32–35 years and in this time the structure of the world will drastically change. The fact is that revolutionist has been born what will change the history of Great Britain".

== See also ==
- Magic
- Astrology
- Alternative medicine
