= José Muñoz Cortés =

Orthodox monk (1948–1997)

Brother José Muñoz Cortés
- Muñoz with the Montreal icon of the Holy Virgin
- Born: 13 May 1948; Santiago, Chile
- Died: 31 October 1997 (aged 49); Athens, Greece
- Other names: Joseph, Brother Ambrose

José Muñoz Cortés (13 May 1948 – 31 October 1997) was an Orthodox monk, and the keeper of a revered copy of the Panagia Portaitissa (Iveron Icon), in Montreal, Canada. After being tonsured a monk, he took the monastic name Ambrose.

== Early life ==
Muñoz was born in Chile into a pious Roman Catholic family of mainly Spanish descent, though he had an English grandmother. When Muñoz was 12, he became acquainted with local Archbishop Leontius (Filippovich), and under his influence Muñoz was baptized into the Russian Orthodox Church Outside Russia two years later, with his mother's consent.

He lived and travelled between New York and Miami (Coconut Grove), where he studied art with a focus on iconography, preparing to become a painter for the Orthodox Church. After Greek monks reported visions of the Mother of God and entrusted him with the guardianship of the Icon, he began travelling worldwide with it, carrying it in a dark red velvet sash.

He was a vegetarian with a particular fondness for potatoes. During his travels, he stayed with families who supported his mission, including Kira Mikhailitchenko and her mother, Irian, as well as her sister Natalia Kavalaushkas, who hosted him in New York and Miami.

The Miami Herald published a feature about the Icon, which drew the attention of a mother whose son had broken his neck in a motorcycle accident. She contacted Kira, requesting that he bring the Icon to Mercy Hospital in Coconut Grove. When he visited the hospital and entered the intensive care unit, witnesses later recounted extraordinary events: premature infants began breathing without incubators, and the young man with the neck injury showed no signs of fracture.

Mercy Hospital, staffed by nuns and priests serving as doctors and nurses, preserved cotton gauze used to wipe the myrrh oil that exuded from the Icon. This gauze was shared with other patients. Although Kira worried this might lead to hysteria or risk to the Icon, reports continued that the cotton retained traces of fragrant myrrh, said to exude the scent of roses even years later. Copies of the Icon from Hawaii to San Francisco to New York and Miami produce the same oil that comes out of the photos.

To this day, individuals claim to still possess pieces of the original myrrh-soaked cotton from the Icon, continuing to witness its fragrance and oil.

== Death ==
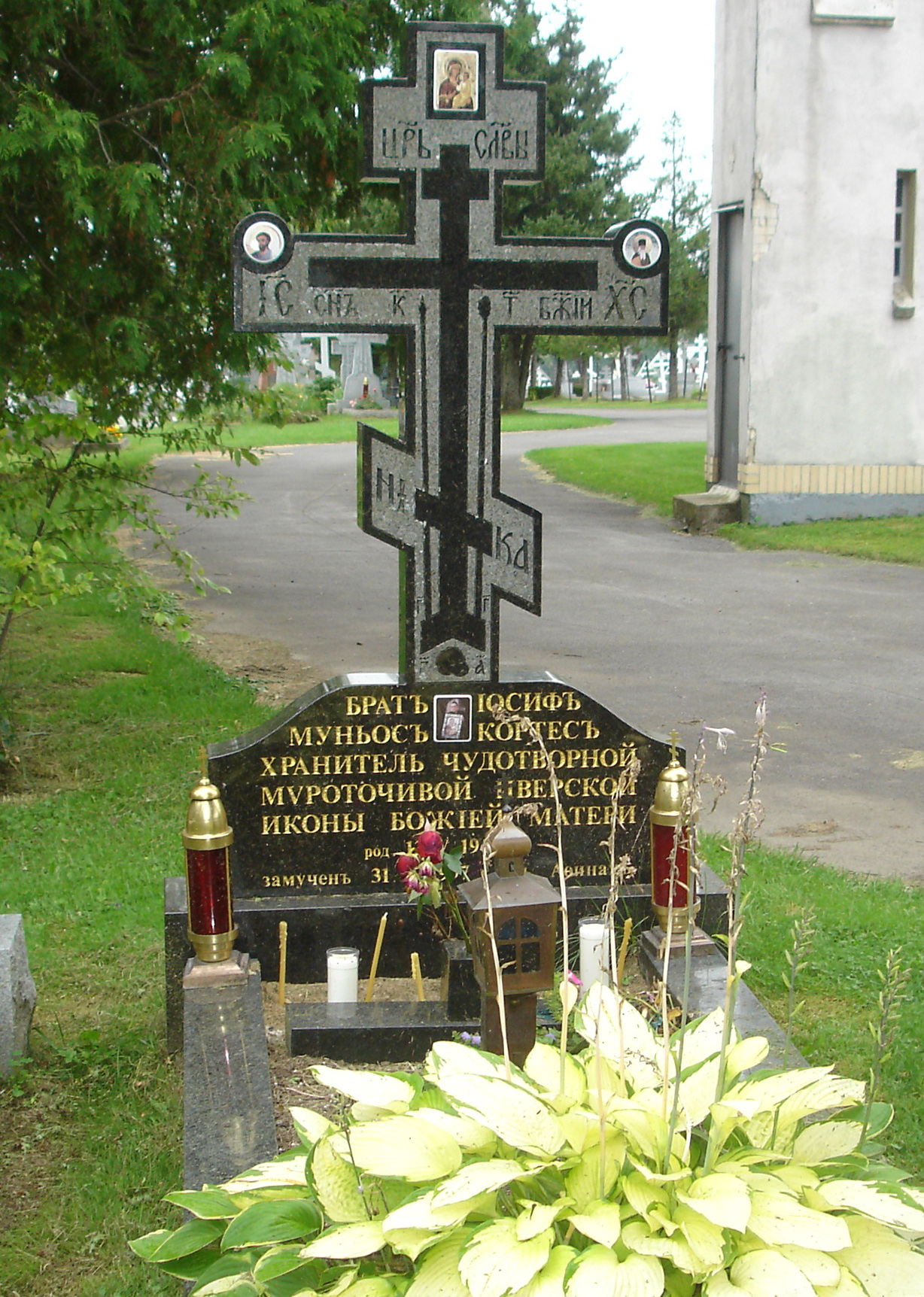
Muñoz' grave at the Holy Trinity cemetery in Jordanville, New York

In October 1997, during one of his trips with the icon, Muñoz was tortured and murdered in a hotel room in Athens, Greece, during the overnight hours of 30 or 31 October. The icon was thought to be stolen. It was found out 5 years later that Jose had a premonition of his impending death and had a friend return the icon to the Greek Monastery for safekeeping. He was tortured for two days in an attempt to reveal where he had hidden the icon and then died of his wounds. The icon still resides in the monastery under the protection of the monks and volunteers. Muñoz had planned to return to Canada the following day to celebrate the fifteenth anniversary of the appearance of the miraculous myrrh on the icon.

=== Aftermath ===
Nicoulai Ciaru, a Romanian, was accused of the murder, and appeared in court in Athens on 18 November 1998. The judicial process continued to 23 November, when Ciaru was acquitted, due to the lack of evidence.

== See also ==
- Panagia Portaitissa
- Mother of God
- Panagia
