= George the Hagiorite =

Georgian monk, religious writer, theologian and translator (1009-1065)

Saint George the Hagiorite
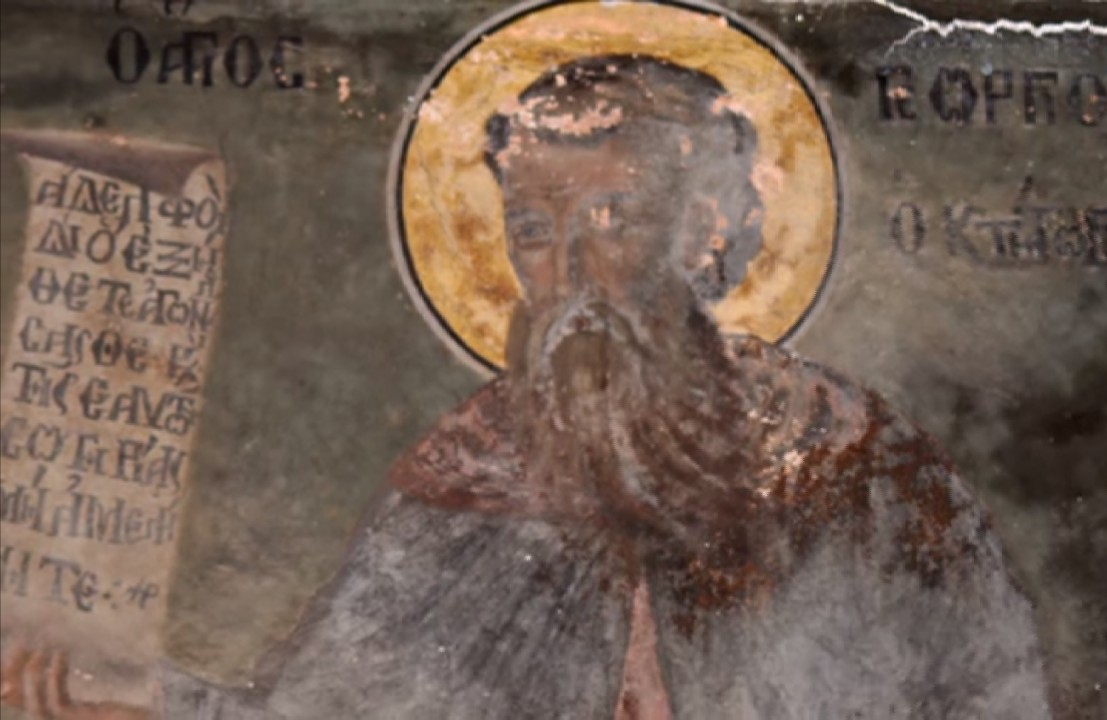
- A fresco of George at Iviron Monastery on Mount Athos

Athonite Father
- Born: 1009; Trialeti, Kingdom of Georgia
- Died: 29 June 1065; Phipopatium, Constantinople
- Venerated in: Eastern Orthodox Church
- Feast: July 10 [O.S. June 27]
- Patronage: Georgia; Mount Athos

George the Hagiorite (Note: also known as George of Athos, Giorgi Mtatsmindeli, Giorgi Atoneli, George the Iberian, or George the Georgian) (Georgian: გიორგი მთაწმინდელი) (1009 – 29 June 1065) was a Georgian monk, calligrapher, religious writer, theologian, and translator who spearheaded the activities of Georgian monastic communities in the Byzantine Empire. His epithets Mt'ats'mindeli and At'oneli, meaning "of the Holy Mountain" (Hagiorite) and "of Athos" (Athonite), respectively, are a reference to his association with the Iviron Monastery on Mount Athos, where he served as hegumen.

One of the most influential Christian churchmen of medieval Georgia, George acted as an arbitrator and facilitator of cross-cultural engagement between his native country and the Byzantine Empire. He extensively translated the Fathers of the Church, the Psalms, works of exegesis, and synaxaria from Greek—some of which had not previously existed in Georgian—revised others, and improved the translations of one of his predecessors, Euthymius of Athos, to whom (and also to John of Athos) George dedicated his most important original work, "The Vitae of John and Euthymius". Active also in Georgia, he helped regulate local canon law and brought his young compatriots to be educated at Athos. His defense of the autocephaly of the Georgian Orthodox Church when it was questioned by the Patriarch of Antioch made him one of the most venerated saints in Georgia.

== First years ==
George was born in Trialeti, a southern province of Georgia, into the aristocratic family of Jacob, sometime envoy of King Bagrat III of Georgia to Iran, and his wife Mariam. He was sent to a local monastery at Tadzrisi at the age of seven to commence his education, and after three years moved to another, at Khakhuli. At the age of seven, he was sent to the women's Timotesubani Monastery, near the village of Tsageri, close to his sister who was a nun there, to learn his letters. He stayed there for three years and returned to his parents. But soon they sent him to the Khakhuli Monastery, in Tao-Klarjeti, near his father's brothers George the Secretary and Sabbas, who were monks there. George the Secretary had served as the chief secretary of David III Kuropalates, the ruler of Tao-Klarjeti. From him he received his religious education, while Saint Hilarion Tvali introduced him to monasticism. Soon, however, he followed his uncle George, who was sent to tutor Phers and his wife, the daughter of Bagrat III. In 1022, however, Phers was arrested by the troops of Basil II for participating in the rebellion of a certain Nikephoros Phokas and Nikephoros Xiphias, and was beheaded. His wife and family were taken as hostages to Constantinople. George the Secretary and the adolescent George followed them and stayed there for twelve years. In Constantinople, George thoroughly studied both Christian and secular education in Greek from renowned philosophers, becoming one of the most educated Georgians of his time. In 1034, when the wife of Phers was freed and returned to Georgia, both Georges followed her. The Secretary found his brother James and they lived together, while the young George returned to the Monastery of Khakhuli, near his uncle Sabbas.

== Monk in Georgia and on the Black Mountain ==
In this monastery George received his monastic tonsure at the age of 25. Soon, however, he left on a pilgrimage to the Holy Land and ended up in the region of Antioch, specifically on the Black Mountain, where there were Georgian monasteries, and where he met a famous hermit, George the Recluse. The latter took over his spiritual guidance and sent him to the nearby Monastery of Saint Romanus, where he lived for three years, serving the sick. Then, around 1039, his Elder (spiritual guide) gave him the Great Schema and sent him to Jerusalem on a pilgrimage. The following year (1040) he sent him to Mount Athos, specifically to the Iviron Monastery, to continue the translation work that Saint Euthymius the Athonite had begun.

== Iviron Monastery ==
Sts Euthymius and George in Holy Cross Monastery (fresco, 17th century)

In 1040, George established himself at the Iviron (literally, "of the Georgians") monastery on Mount Athos, Greece. In this monastery, George initially engaged in humble tasks, serving the senior monks. Two years later, Saint George the Recluse learned that he had not yet been ordained a priest, nor had he begun translating from Greek into his native language, and he rebuked him through a disciple. George was then ordained a deacon and priest and took on the service of the ecclesiarch (that is, the coordinator of church services and the readings recited during them and at meals). At first, he translated the Synaxarion of Constantinople, because Saint Euthymius had only left a summary of it in Georgian. He then began gathering information about Saint Euthymius (who had passed away 14 years earlier) from monks who had known him and from existing written sources. In 1044, he completed compiling the lives of Saints John and Euthymius, the two initial founders of the monastery. That same year he was elected abbot. He then undertook to fully implement the monastic institutions established by Saint Euthymius, to continue his translation work, to reorganize the scriptorium, and to secure the rights of the monastery to its many metochia (dependency properties). Thus, he contacted the Byzantine court in Constantinople and developed a friendly relationship with Emperor Constantine IX. By means of his chrysobull, the emperor legislated three annual revenues for the monastery and intervened whenever its properties were contested.

He transferred the relics of the holy founders John and Euthymius and of their associates, Saints Arsenius of Ninotsminda and John Grdzelidze, from various locations inside and outside the monastery, placed them in a sarcophagus on the right side of the liti οf the Katholikon (main church), and commanded that three vigil lamps be kept burning there. In 1054, he went to Constantinople once more, presumably for monastery business, and there he met King Bagrat IV of Georgia and his mother Mariam. The king repeatedly begged him to become the primate of the Church of Georgia, but George refused. He reorganized and refurbished the Iviron cloister and made it into a vibrant center of Georgian Orthodox culture.

== Syria and Constantinople ==
In August 1056 George left his fellow monk George of Oltisi in charge of the Iviron monastery and traveled to Constantinople, where he met Queen Mariam. She intervened on his behalf with Emperor Michael VI, who, acting like his predecessors whom we have seen were protectors of the monastery, accepted the mission of George to Antioch. There he appear before the Patriarch to defend his brethren, accused by a group of Greek clerics of heresy. The dispute quickly evolved around the canonical legality of the autocephaly of the Georgian Orthodox church, which had originally operated within the framework of the see of Antioch but had been becoming increasingly independent since the 6th century. In defense of the Georgian autocephaly, George referred to St. Andrew's mission to ancient Colchis and Iberia, a version which appears in medieval Georgian ecclesiastical tradition. Early in the 11th century, the autocephalous catholicos Melchizedek I (1012–30) assumed the additional title of patriarch, but Antioch was reluctant to recognize the move on the grounds that none of the Twelve Apostles had peregrinated in Georgia. In the end, George persuaded Theodosius III of Antioch to grant confirmation of the autocephalous status of the Georgian church. This happened around the same time that the Byzantine government finally abandoned its efforts to force Georgia into submission and reconciled with the Georgian king Bagrat IV.

George took a considerably more moderate position toward the Western Church than most Eastern hierarchs during the East–West Schism of 1054. In 1064, in the presence of Byzantine Emperor Constantine X, he stated that he did not regard the Latin practice of the Eucharist as heretical. Nevertheless, he considered the Filioque heretical and translated the anti-Latin works of Photius I of Constantinople into Georgian. In the Synaxarion he manually copied, Photius is honored as a saint.

== Georgia and death ==
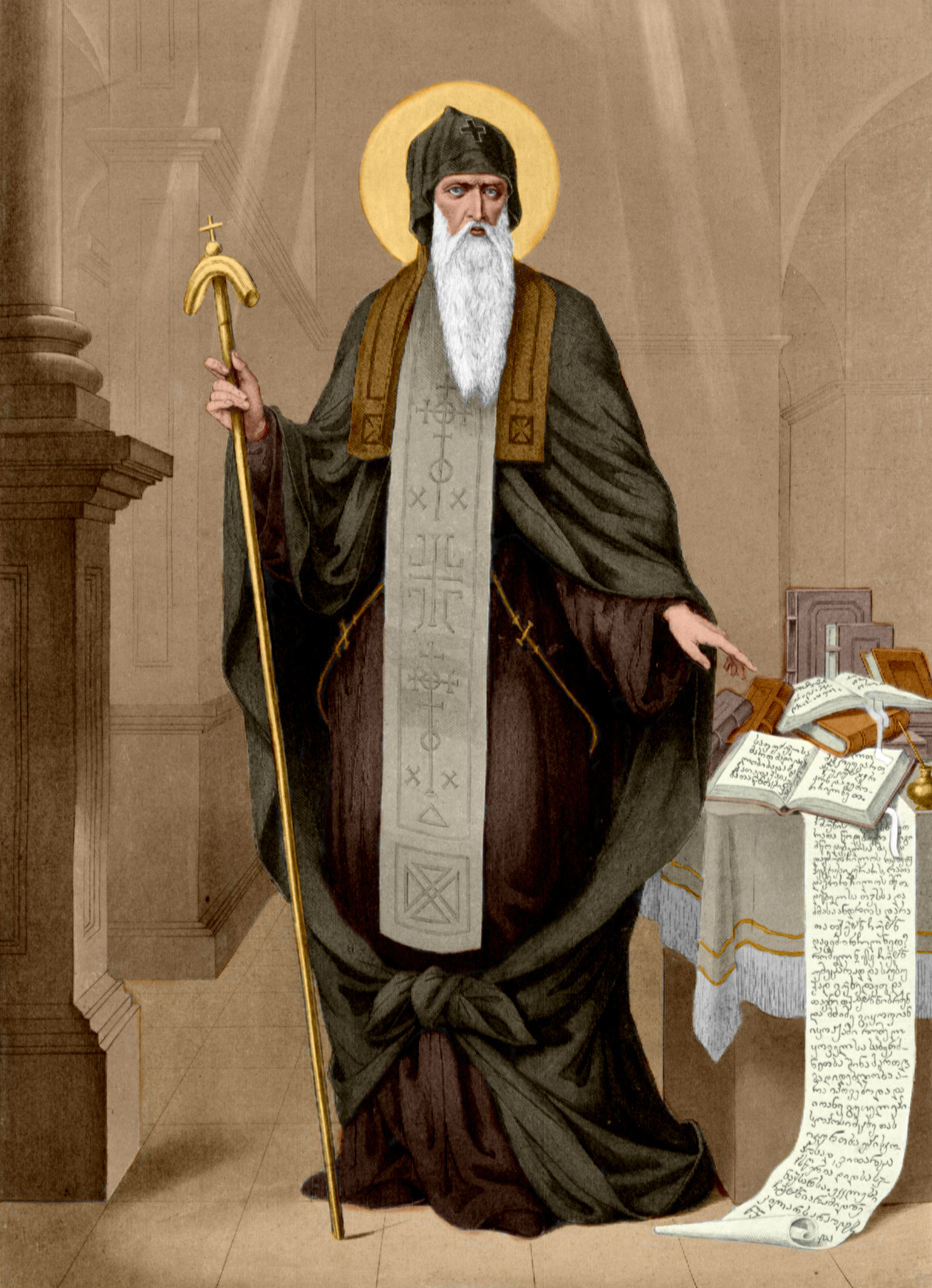
George the Hagiorite by Mikhail Sabinin

Although George declined Bagrat IV's repeated requests to lead the Georgian church, he, in 1057/8, accepted the royal invitation to return to Georgia for five years. There, he initiated reforms in the Georgian church that contributed to a cleansed ecclesiastical hierarchy and regulated its relations with the increasingly powerful royal authority. On his way back to Greece, George visited Constantinople and obtained an imperial decree for the education of Georgian students at Athos. He did not reach his destination, however, and died at Philopatium on 29 June 1065. The Athonite monks interred him at the Iviron monastery.

Efrem Mtsire, one of is disciples composed his Vita in 1066. George the Hagiorite was subsequently canonized by the Georgian Orthodox Church and is remembered annually on 10 July.

== Legacy ==
Cod. georg. ivir. 45 (Parakletike, translated by St George), in his own hand (between 1053 and 1065)

The influence of George’s legacy on Georgian religious tradition was immense. He translated almost all the liturgical and hymnographical books required for the performance of the services. (Today, ten manuscripts containing his translations are preserved in the Iviron Monastery, written entirely or in part in his own hand). He worked on an updated translation of the Gospels and translated, more literally, the Psalter, writings of Basil of Caesarea, Gregory of Nyssa, Athanasius, Cyril of Alexandria, John of Damascus, Nectarius of Constantinople, Dorotheus of Tyre, Theodor the Studite, Photius and others. His translations, as well as his original works, set the standards for medieval Georgian hymnography, liturgy, and hagiography. His work may be considered a continuation, and to some extent a rectification, of that of Euthymius (c. 955–1028), and it marked the high point of the literary tradition flourishing at the foreign centers of Georgian monasticism.

The activity of George and his fellow Athonite Georgians laid the foundation for the basic principles of Christian practice and moral life, as well as for the relationship between the royal court and the church, later promoted and officially adopted by the national ecclesiastical council of Ruisi-Urbnisi held under the presidency of King David IV in 1103.

"The Vitae of Our Blessed Fathers John and Euthymius and an Account of their Worthy Achievements" (ცხოვრება ნეტარისა მამისა ჩუენისა იოანესი და ეფთჳმესი და უწყებაჲ ღირსისა მის მოქალაქობისა მათისაჲ) is George's most important original work, dedicated to his Athonite forerunners. It combines hagiography with religious and political propaganda and historical record. Written sometime after 1040, this manuscript of some 12,000 words in the Athos collection is both a history and a praise of the Iviron community, their contribution to Georgian patristic literature, and the defense of Byzantine monasticism. Apart from its political and theological message, George’s work is noted for its graphic, rhythmic prose, describing monks working in gardens and vineyards. In 1066, a year after his death, George himself became the subject of a similar biography by his disciple George the Minor (or Priest-Monk George [died post-1083]).
