= John Tornike =

Georgian general and monk

Saint John Tornike
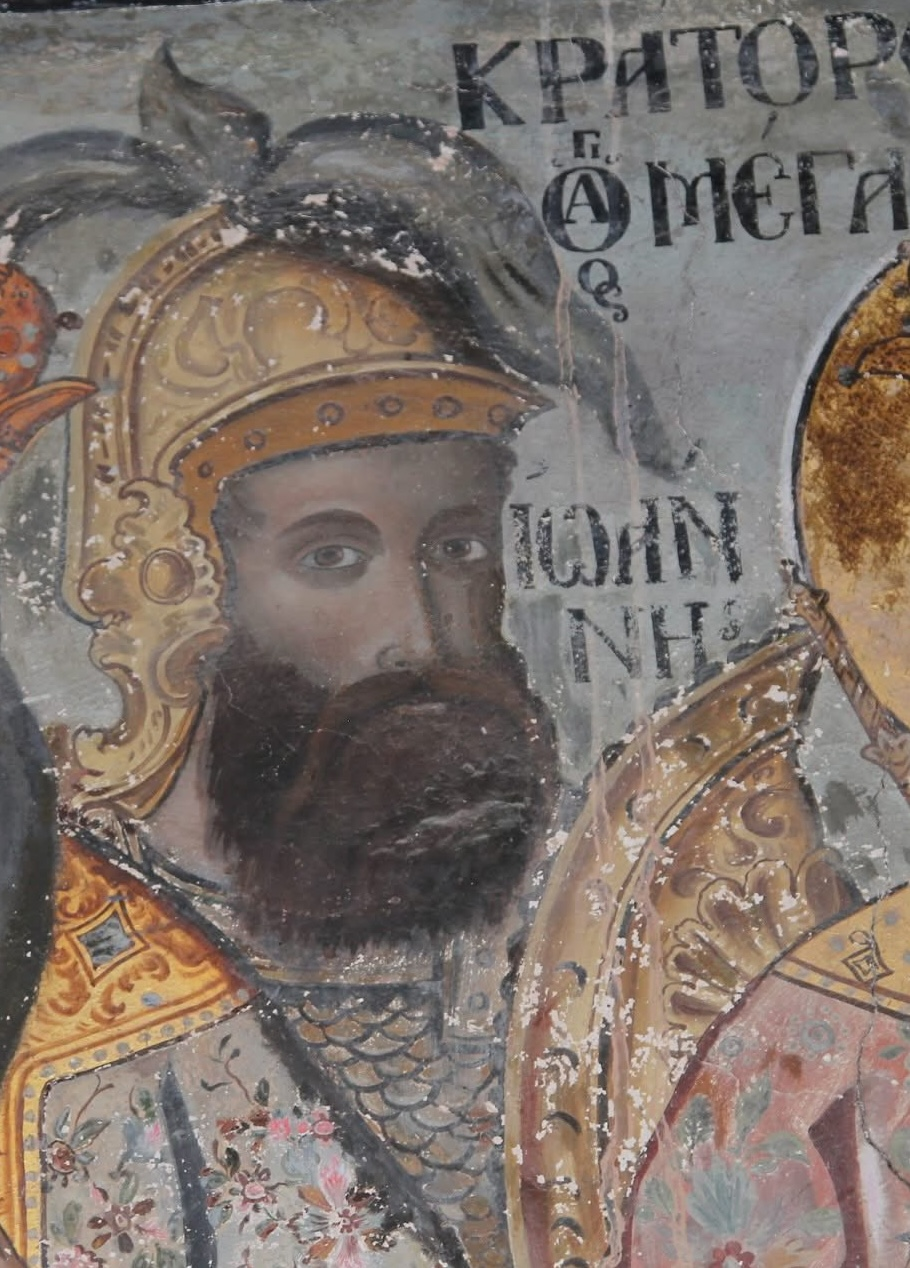
- A fresco of Tornike at Iviron on Mount Athos

Athonite Father
- Born: c. 920; Kingdom of the Iberians
- Died: 985; Mount Athos
- Venerated in: Eastern Orthodox Church
- Major shrine: Iviron
- Feast: June 12
- Patronage: Georgia; Mount Athos

John Tornike (Georgian: იოანე თორნიკე, romanized: ioane tornik'e; Greek: Ιωάννης Τορνίκιος), also known as Tornike Eristavi (Georgian: თორნიკე ერისთავი; died in 985) was a retired Georgian general and monk who came to be better known as a founder of the formerly Georgian Orthodox Iviron Monastery on Mount Athos in modern-day northeastern Greece.

== Life ==
Tornike came from a notable Georgian noble family and was in the immediate circles of the ruling dynasty of the Bagrationi. His father, Chordvaneli, had been in the suite of the Georgian prince Ashot II Kuropalates, who had paid a visit to the Byzantine emperor Constantine Porphyrogennetos in Constantinople in c. 950. Three of his nephews had military careers, and one of them, Varazvache, held the post of katepano (military governor) of the significant Byzantine eastern outpost Edessa in 1037–8.

Tornike served a very successful military and court career (specifically, he was eristavi, a Georgian equivalent of strategos) under the Georgian Bagratid dynasty and also gained the Byzantine title of patrikios. He resigned his position as a general of the Georgian prince David III of Tao in c. 963 and, under the name of Ioane (Ioannis, or John), retired to Athanasius’ Lavra on Mount Athos. He was joined, in the early 970s, by another retired Georgian officer, Ioane, and his son Ek'vt'ime.

In 976, a rebellion led by Bardas Skleros broke out in the Asian provinces of the Byzantine Empire, the greatest upheaval of the emperor Basil II’s early reign. Skleros had won a series of battles against the then-loyal general Bardas Phokas and marched from the east through Anatolia to Constantinople. Basil summoned John-Tornike to his capital to mediate the alliance with David III of Tao, a measure that seemed necessary to save the situation. The monk agreed reluctantly, persuaded chiefly by his fellow monks that it would be in the best interests of the Athonite community for him to obey the imperial command. David responded vigorously and entrusted his former general with the command of some 12,000 Georgian cavalrymen sent to reinforce the imperial army. The decisive battle was fought at Pankalia near Caesarea on March 24, 979, and resulted in the crushing defeat of the rebels.

== Founding of Iviron monastery ==
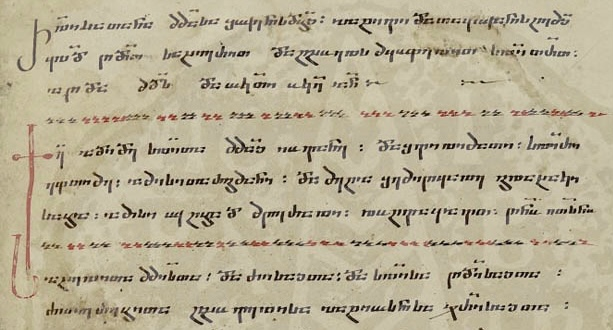
Nuskhuri manuscript of John Tornike collection of the Monastery of Iviron, 10th century.

In reward for their support, David was awarded the lifetime stewardship of extensive lands in northeastern Anatolia, while John-Tornike was conferred the title of synkellos (assistant to the patriarch of Constantinople). More importantly, the victorious monk-general returned to Athos laden with the spoils of war—"precious objects" as well as twelve kentenaria (1,200 lb) of gold—which enabled the Georgians to establish their own house on Athos, called Iviron. Although now populated with Greeks, the monastery is to this day known by the Greek appellation Iviron, "of the Iberians", i.e., Georgians. The emperor also showered him with lands and privileges, granted subsidies, and exempted him from taxes. The new monastic house, destined to become a vibrant center of Georgian Orthodox culture, was jointly run by John-Tornike as ktetor (founder) and his friend John the Iberian as hegoumenos (abbot).

== Bibliography ==
- Morris, R. (2002). Monks and Laymen in Byzantium, 843–1118. Cambridge University Press. pp. 85–86. ISBN 0-521-26558-4.
- Bogveradze, A. (1979). Georgian Soviet Encyclopedia, Vol. 4. p. 695.
- Zhordania, T. (1893). Chronicles, Vol. I.
- S. Kaukhchishvili, ed. (1963–1966). Georgica. Byzantine Authors’ Reports on Georgia, Vols. IV–V, VI.
- Javakhishvili, I. (1948). History of the Georgian Nation, Vol. II.
- Berdzenishvili, N.; Javakhishvili, I.; Janashia, S. (1948). History of Georgia, Part I.
- Metreveli, E. (1996). Essays on the Cultural and Educational Centers of Athos.
- Patriarch Alexy II of Moscow and All Russia, ed. (2001). Orthodox Encyclopedia. Vol. III.
- Lomouri, N. On the History of Bardas Skleros’ Rebellion. Tbilisi State University Works, No. 67.
