= Klykovo =

Klykovo Клыково
- Village
- Location within Vologda Oblast Location within Russia
- Coordinates: 60°40′N 42°05′E
- Country: Russia
- Region: Vologda Oblast
- District: Verkhovazhsky District
- Time zone: UTC+3:00

Klykovo (Russian: Клыково) is a rural locality (a village) in Nizhne-Vazhskoye Rural Settlement, Verkhovazhsky District, Vologda Oblast, Russia. The population was 32 as of 2002.

== Geography ==
Klykovo is located 8 km south of Verkhovazhye (the district's administrative centre) by road. Pakhomovskaya is the nearest rural locality.
