= Panagia Portaitissa =

Eastern Orthodox icon of the Virgin Mary

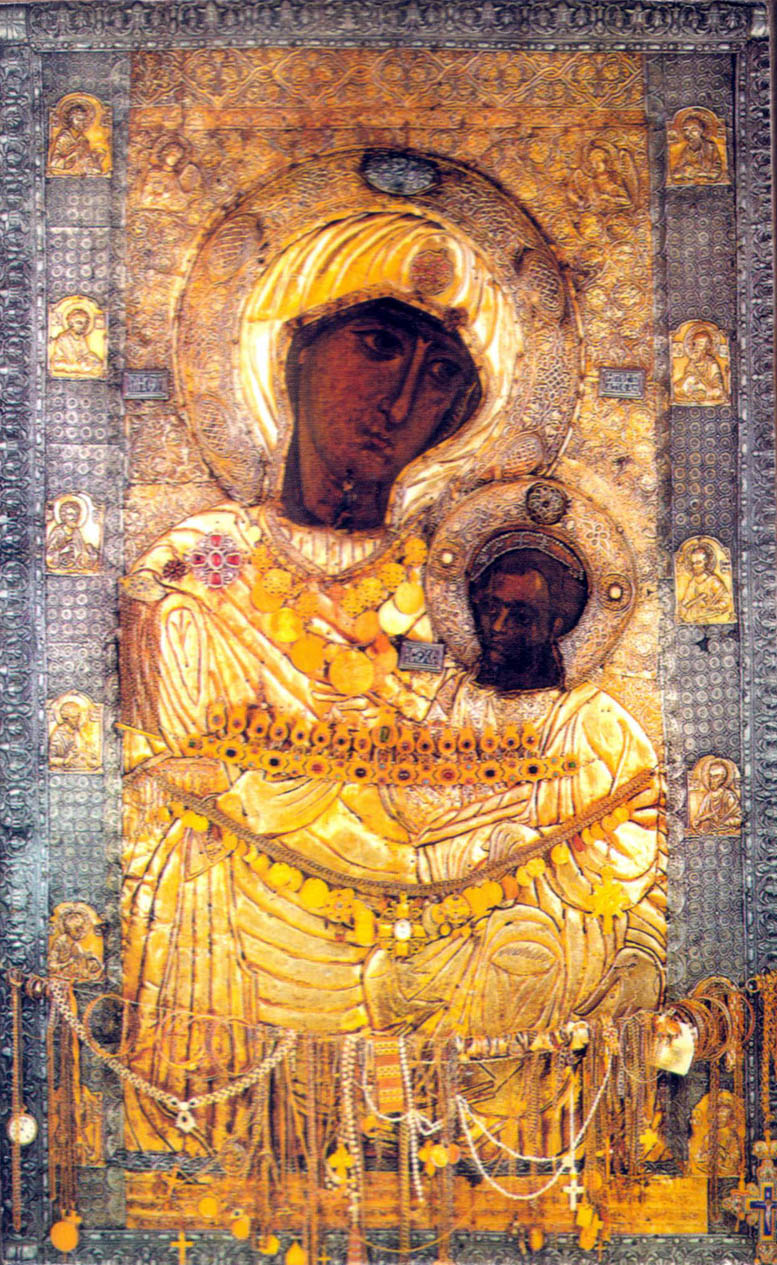
Our Lady of Iveron, Mount Athos, Greece

The Panagia Portaitissa (Greek: Παναγία Πορταΐτισσα; Georgian: ივერიის ღვთისმშობლის ხატი) also known as the Iviron Theotokos or Iverskaya in Russian, is an Eastern Orthodox icon of the Virgin Mary in the Georgian Iviron monastery on Mount Athos in Greece, where it is believed to have been since the year 999. According to the sacred tradition of the Eastern Orthodox Church it was painted by Luke the Evangelist. The icon is referred to as "Wonderworking" meaning that numerous miracles have been attributed to the intercession of the Theotokos (Mother of God) by persons praying before it. The synaxis (feast day) for this icon is on February 12, as well as on Bright Tuesday, and also on October 13 for the translation to Moscow of the Iveron icon.

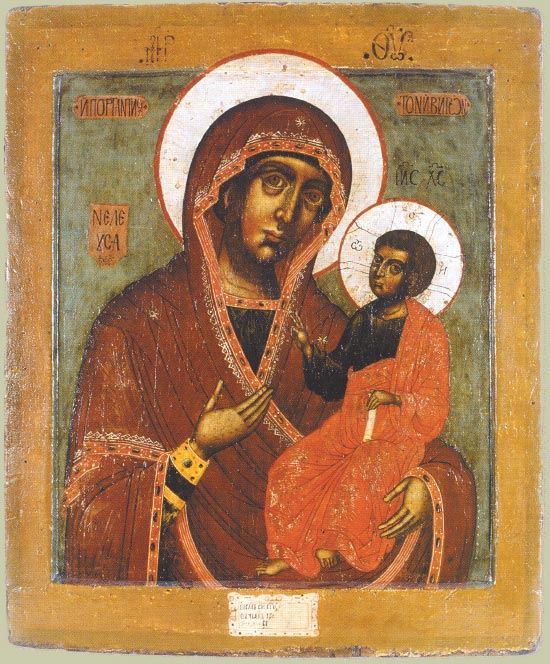
17th-century Russian version

The icon belongs to a family of images of the Theotokos known as Hodegetria (Greek: Όδηγήτρια, "she who leads the way") after the prototype from Constantinople. In these icons, the Christ Child sits on his mother's left arm and she is depicted pointing to Christ with her right hand. Another famous icon based upon Hodegetria is Our Lady of Częstochowa.

A unique characteristic of this icon is what appears to be a scar on the Virgin Mary's right cheek or her chin. A number of different traditions exist to explain this, but the one most commonly held by Orthodox Christians is that the icon was stabbed by a soldier in Nicaea during the period of Byzantine iconoclasm under the Emperor Theophilus (829–842). According to tradition, when the icon was stabbed, blood miraculously flowed out of the wound.

The original in Iveron is encased in a chased riza of silver and gold covering almost all the figures except the faces, as is common with the most venerated icons.

== Traditional history ==
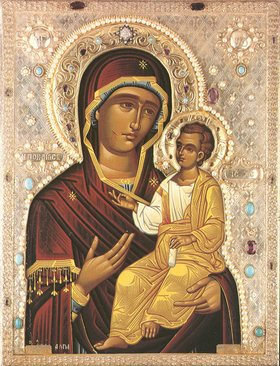
Panagia Portaitissa, the Montreal replica

According to the Orthodox Church's sacred tradition, the icon was at one time in the possession of a widow in Nicaea. Not wanting the icon to be seized and destroyed by the iconoclasts, she spent all night in prayer and then cast the icon into the Mediterranean Sea. The widow's son later went to Mount Athos, where he became a monk and recounted the miracle of the bleeding wound, and how the icon had been placed in the sea. Much later (c. 1004) the icon was recovered from the sea by a Georgian monk named Gabriel the Iberian (later canonized a saint in the Orthodox Church), who was laboring at the Iveron Monastery on Mount Athos. This occurred on Tuesday of Bright Week (Easter Week), and is commemorated annually on that day (as well as the fixed date of March 31). The icon was taken to the katholikon (main church) of the monastery from which the icon gets its name.

The tradition goes on to say that the following day, when the monks entered the church they could not find the icon. After searching they discovered the icon hanging on the gates of the monastery. This occurrence was repeated several times, until St. Gabriel reported that he had seen a vision of the Theotokos, wherein she revealed that she did not want her icon to be guarded by the monks, but rather she intended to be their Protectress. After this, the icon was permanently installed in a small Chapel next to the Gates where it remains to this day. Because of this, the icon came to be called Portaitissa or "Gate-Keeper". This title was not new for the Virgin Mary, but comes from a verse of the Akathist to the Mother of God: "Rejoice, O Blessed Gate-Keeper who opens the gates of Paradise to the righteous." Orthodox monks and nuns throughout the world will often place an icon of the Theotokos Iverskaya on the monastery gates. It is also common in Orthodox temples (church buildings) to place an icon of the Theotokos Portaitissa on the inside of the iconostasis, above the Holy Doors, looking towards the Holy Table (altar table).

== Moscow version ==
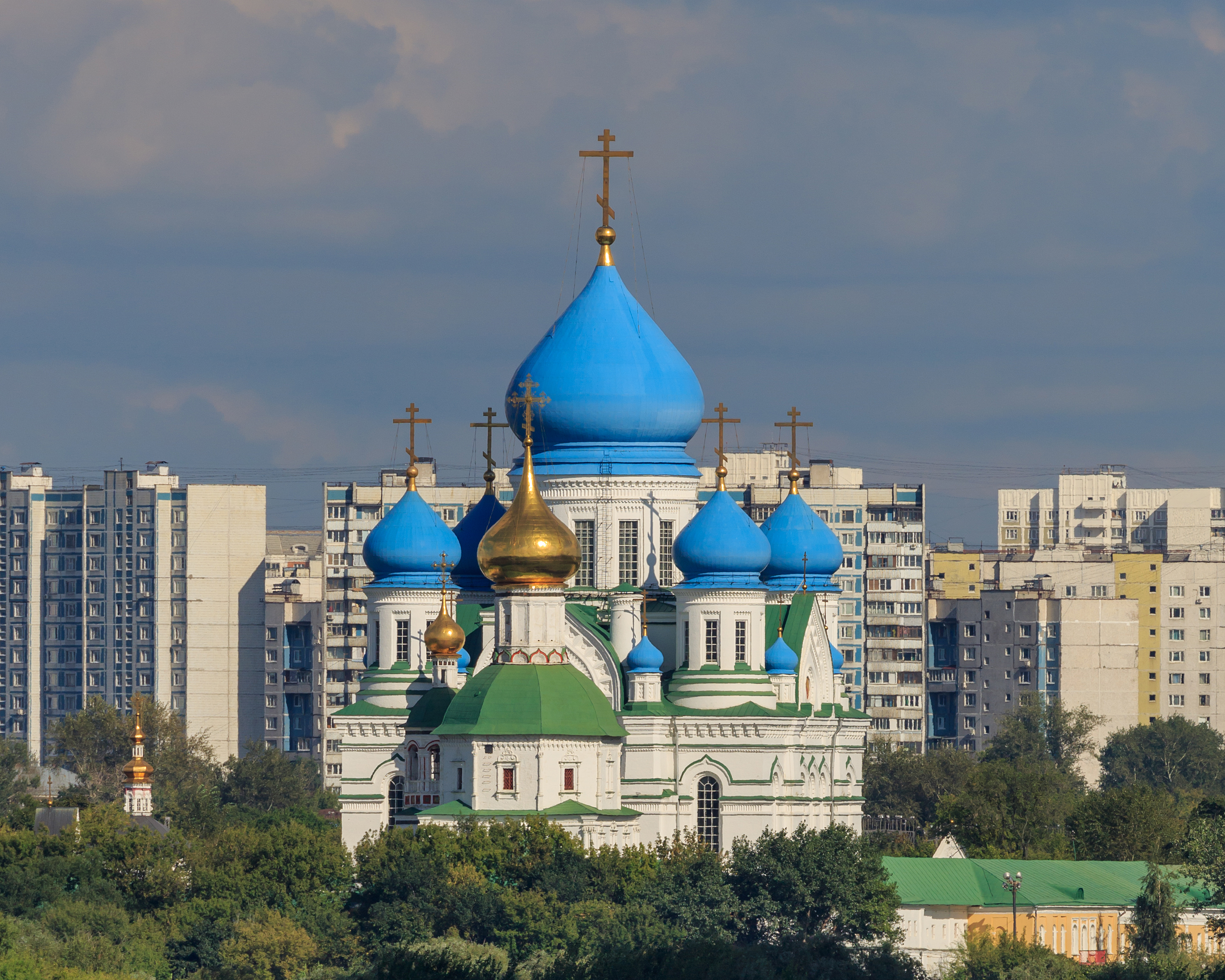
The cathedral dedicated to the Our Lady of Iveron, in the Nikolo-Perervinsky Monastery, Moscow.

In 1648, Patriarch Nikon of Moscow, while he was still Archimandrite of Novospassky Monastery, commissioned an exact copy of the Iviron icon to be made and sent to Russia. Almost immediately upon its arrival on October 13, the icon was "glorified" with numerous miracles attributed to it by the faithful. The Iverskaya Chapel was built in 1669 to enshrine the icon next to the Kremlin walls in Moscow. The chapel was the main entrance to Red Square and traditionally everyone, from the Tsar down to the lowest peasant would stop there to venerate the icon before entering the square. After the Bolshevik Revolution of 1917, the chapel was destroyed by the Communists and the fate of the icon is unknown to this day.

== Montreal version ==
As is common in the Orthodox Church, the icon is a prototype which has been copied numerous times. Several of the copies themselves have been known to be wonderworking, one of the most famous of which is the myrrh-streaming icon from Montreal in Canada. For fifteen years (1982–1997), as myrrh continued to flow from the Icon, Brother José Muñoz Cortés devoted himself to its care, accompanying it on numerous trips to parishes all over the United States and Canada, to South America, Australia, and Europe. The icon was stolen on one such trip, in October 1997, when Brother Muñoz Cortés was tortured and murdered in a hotel room in Athens, Greece; the icon has not been seen since. He had planned to return to Montreal the following day to celebrate the fifteenth anniversary of the appearance of the miraculous myrrh on the icon. A new copy of the Montreal Myrrh-Streaming Iveron Icon began streaming Myrrh at the Russian Orthodox Church in Hawaii in 2007. Several feast days during the liturgical year celebrate a few of these miracles (see External links, below).

== Veneration ==
Nehemias is venerated in Orthodox Church:

- 12 February – translation to Valday Iversky Monastery (1656),
- 31 March – Appearance of the Iverion Icon of the Mother of God (999),
- 23 April – returning the icon from the museum to Dormition Cathedral, Moscow in 2012
- 13 October – translation to Iberian Gate in 1648
- On Bright Tuesday

== See also ==
- Monastery of the Theotokos of Iveron (Samara)
