= Monastery of Iviron =

Eastern Orthodox monastery, Mount Athos

The Sacred Patriarchal and Stavopegial Monastery Iviron
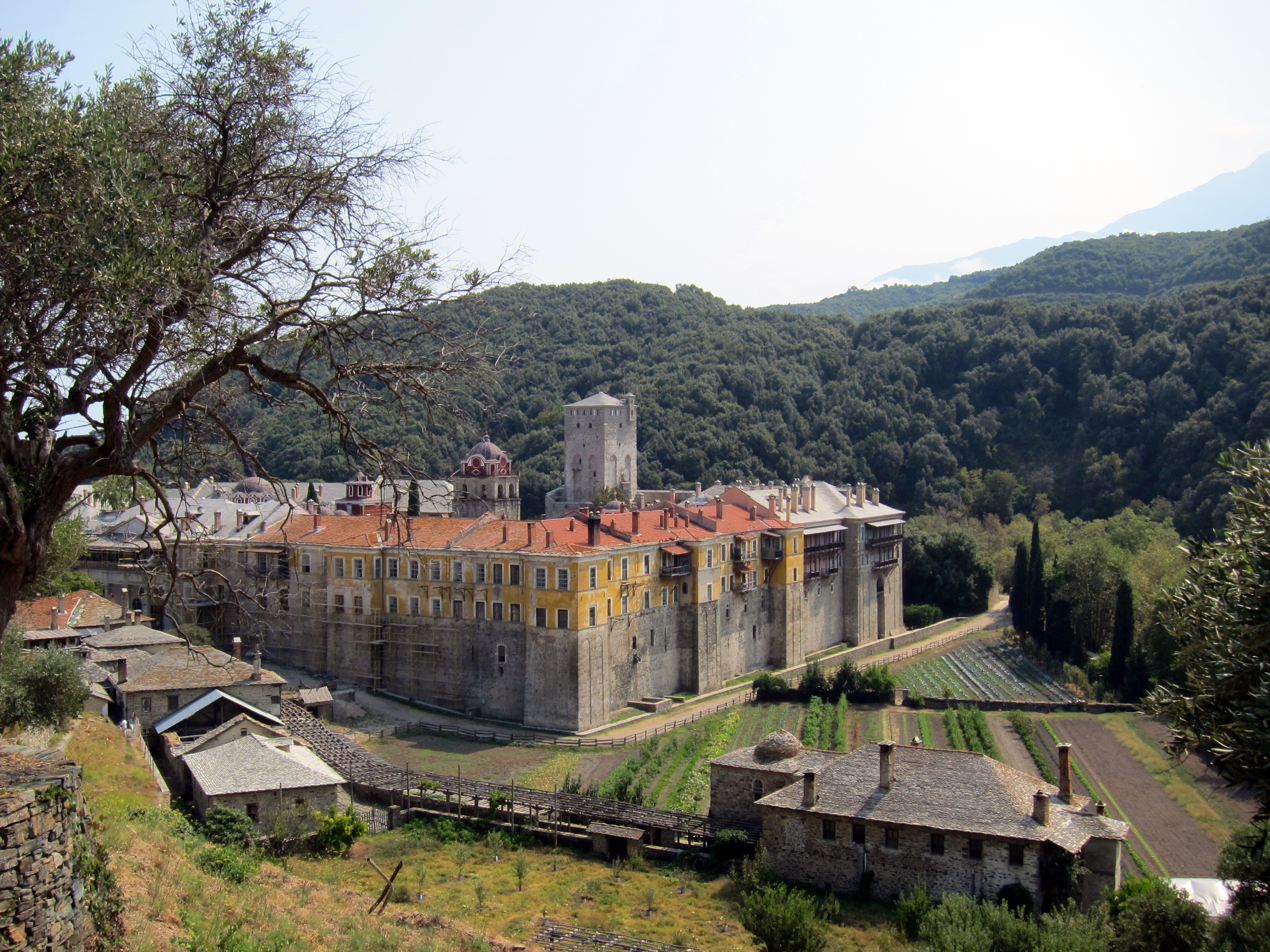
- Monastery as seen from a nearby trail

- Location within Mount Athos

Monastery information
- Denomination: Eastern Orthodoxy
- Established: between 980-983
- Dedication: Dormition of the Theotokos
- Archdiocese: Constantinople (Stavropegial)

People
- Founders: John the Iberian and John Tornike
- Abbot: Archimandrite Nathanael
- Archbishop: Ecumenical Patriarch Bartholomew of Constantinople
- Important associated figures: George of Athos, John Tornike, John the Iberian, Gabriel the Iberian, Euthymius of Athos, Archimandrite Averchie

Architecture
- Status: Open and functioning
- Heritage designation: UNESCO World Heritage Site
- Designated date: 1988

Site
- Location: Mount Athos
- Country: Greece
- Coordinates: 40.2455°N 24.2848°E
- Public access: Men only, with an access permit (διαμονητήριον)
- Website: www.imiviron.gr

The Monastery of Iviron (Georgian: ათონის ივერთა მონასტერი, romanized: atonis iverta monast'eri ; Greek: Μονή Ιβήρων, romanized: Monḗ Ivirōn) is an Eastern Orthodox monastery in the monastic community of Mount Athos in northern Greece. The monastery was founded by two Georgian monks, John the Iberian and John Tornike, between AD 980–983. It is regarded as the historic Georgian monastery on Mount Athos and was traditionally inhabited by Georgian Orthodox monks for nearly a millennium, until the mid-20th century. It is home to the famous Panagia Portaitissa icon of Virgin Mary.

== History ==
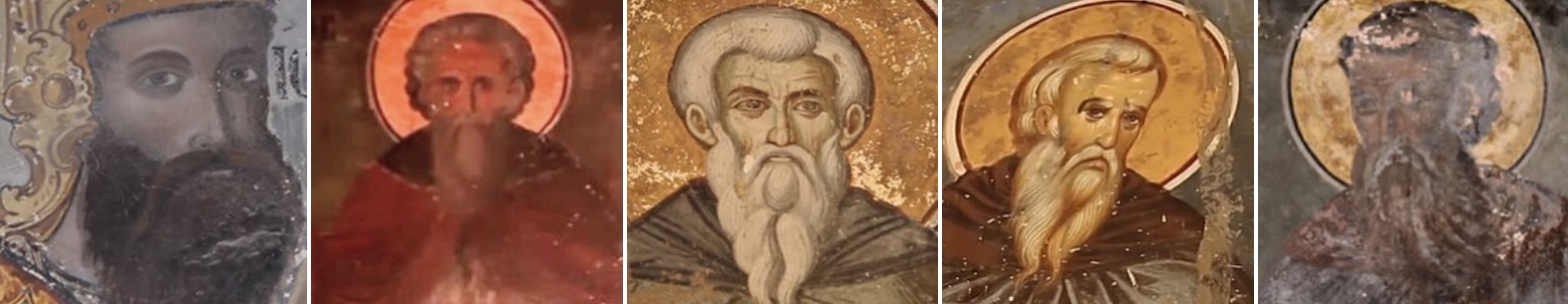
Georgian Athonite Fathers: Tornike Eristavi, John the Iberian, Euthymius the Athonite, Gabriel the Iberian, and George the Hagiorite

=== Center of medieval Georgian scholarship ===
The monastery was founded by Georgian monks, John the Iberian and John Tornike between AD 980–83 to serve as a center of scholarship for Georgian clergy and priests. John the Iberian was appointed as the abbot of the newly founded monastery in 980. In 1005, Euthymius the Iberian became the secondary abbot of Iviron Monastery. In Greek, Iviron means "of the Iberians", referring to the core Georgian kingdom, a demonym used to describe Georgians in historical and literary contexts.

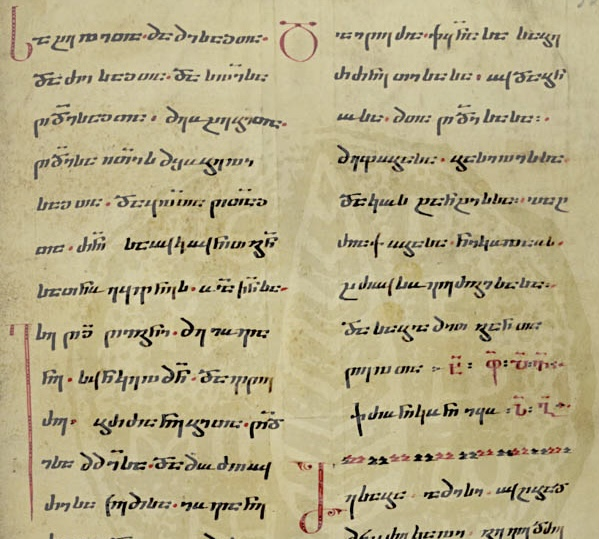
Georgian manuscript from John Tornike's collection at the Iviron, 10th century

In the Middle Ages, the monastery became a center of Georgian religious culture. A large group of Georgian scholars and calligraphers was active at the monastery. Among them was George the Hagiorite and under their guidance, extensive cultural and creative activities flourished: original works were composed, and significant Byzantine theological texts were translated into Georgian. The monastery received substantial financial support from Georgian monarchs and other Georgian donors. It was reportedly so well-endowed that it distributed some of the funds donated by wealthy Georgians to other monasteries on Mount Athos to alleviate any resentment.

However, as the Kingdom of Georgia weakened, the Greeks gradually supplanted Georgians and took possession of the monastery, with Georgians being reduced to a minority after 1357. This Greek takeover of the monastery culminated several centuries of lingering concerns among Georgians that their Byzantine counterparts sought to usurp Georgia's overseas possessions throughout the Balkans. Despite the collapse of the Georgian Kingdom and subsequent Greek takeover, the monastery continued to rely on Georgians for patronage and support beyond the 17th century.

=== Attempts at Georgian-Russian cooperation ===
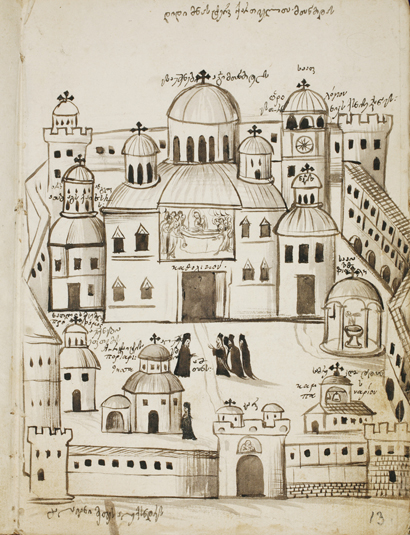
Monastery of Iviron, painted by Timote Gabashvili, 1750s

In the 19th century, following the annexation of Georgia by the Russian Empire, Georgians sought to reinforce their presence at Iviron, at times assisted by the Russians, who were also increasingly at odds with the Greeks. The monastery was visited by the likes of Platon Ioseliani to survey remaining Georgian heritage and manuscripts. In the 1860s, an injection of 35,000 rubles collected by a Georgian donor and the arrival of 40 new Georgian monks was met with resistance from the Greeks, who did not want to see Georgian presence expanded. Russians from the St. Panteleimon Monastery assisted Georgians by providing them with building materials. The Greeks ultimately demolished the buildings and gardens constructed by Georgians and did not allow them back into the monastery. The involvement of Russians in support of Georgians further strained relations between Greek and Russian monastic communities. During this period, "Athos Russian clergy, using all the methods, tried to gain support of Georgian monks persecuted by Greeks and collaborate with them". Spreading Russian authority over the historically Georgian monastery would have had the potential to increase Russia's standing in the Christian world.

In 1879, nobility of Georgia petitioned the Russian Imperial government to use its influence in restoring the Georgian character of the Iviron monastery. However, the Tsarist authorities, who did not want to further strain relations with the Greeks, declined official assistance, claiming that they could not take responsibility for the protection of monks who were abroad. Though the Russian Ambassador to the Ottoman Empire maintained that the Georgian monks at Iviron should have the same rights as Greek ones, overall it was decreed that "The embassy considers inconvenient to assume taking care on Georgians." Instead, Russia prioritized building the New Athos Monastery on the Black Sea coast of Georgia, which was meant to accommodate Russian monks who, at the time, feared being expelled from the original Mount Athos due to continued enmity between Russia and the Ottoman Empire.

=== Modern period ===
Despite the aforementioned challenges, "a Georgian minority survived at Iviron until the mid 20th century, and the monastery continued to turn to Georgia for assistance in time of stress", securing its place in the cultural and spiritual memory of the Georgian people. The monastery ranks third in the Athonite hierarchy of 20 sovereign monasteries. Although no Georgian monks currently reside at Iviron Monastery, a small number of Georgian monks are present elsewhere on Mount Athos. According to data from 2011, three Georgian monks resided at Xeropotamou Monastery and one at Hilandar Monastery.

== Gallery ==
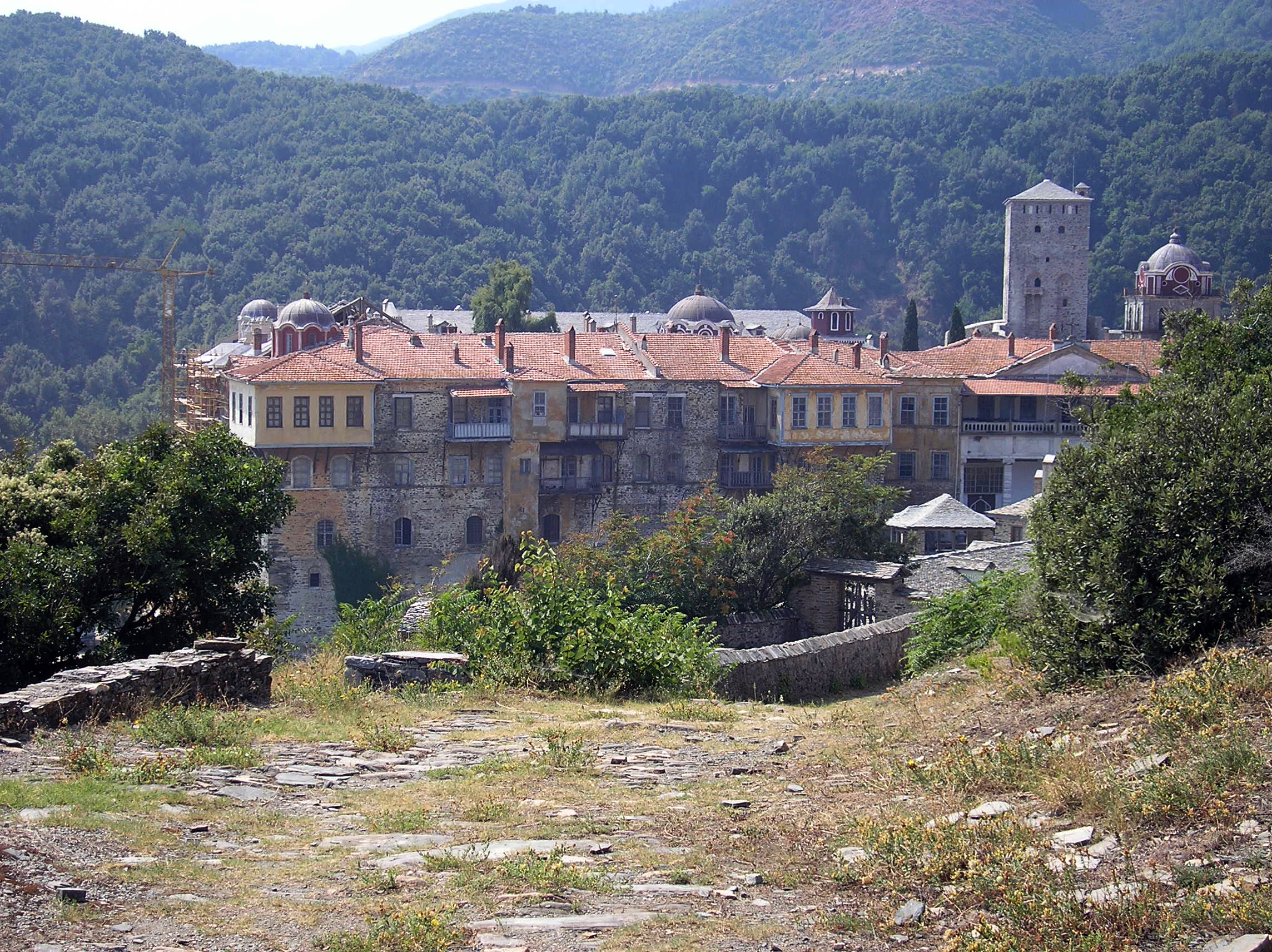
View of the main monastery complex

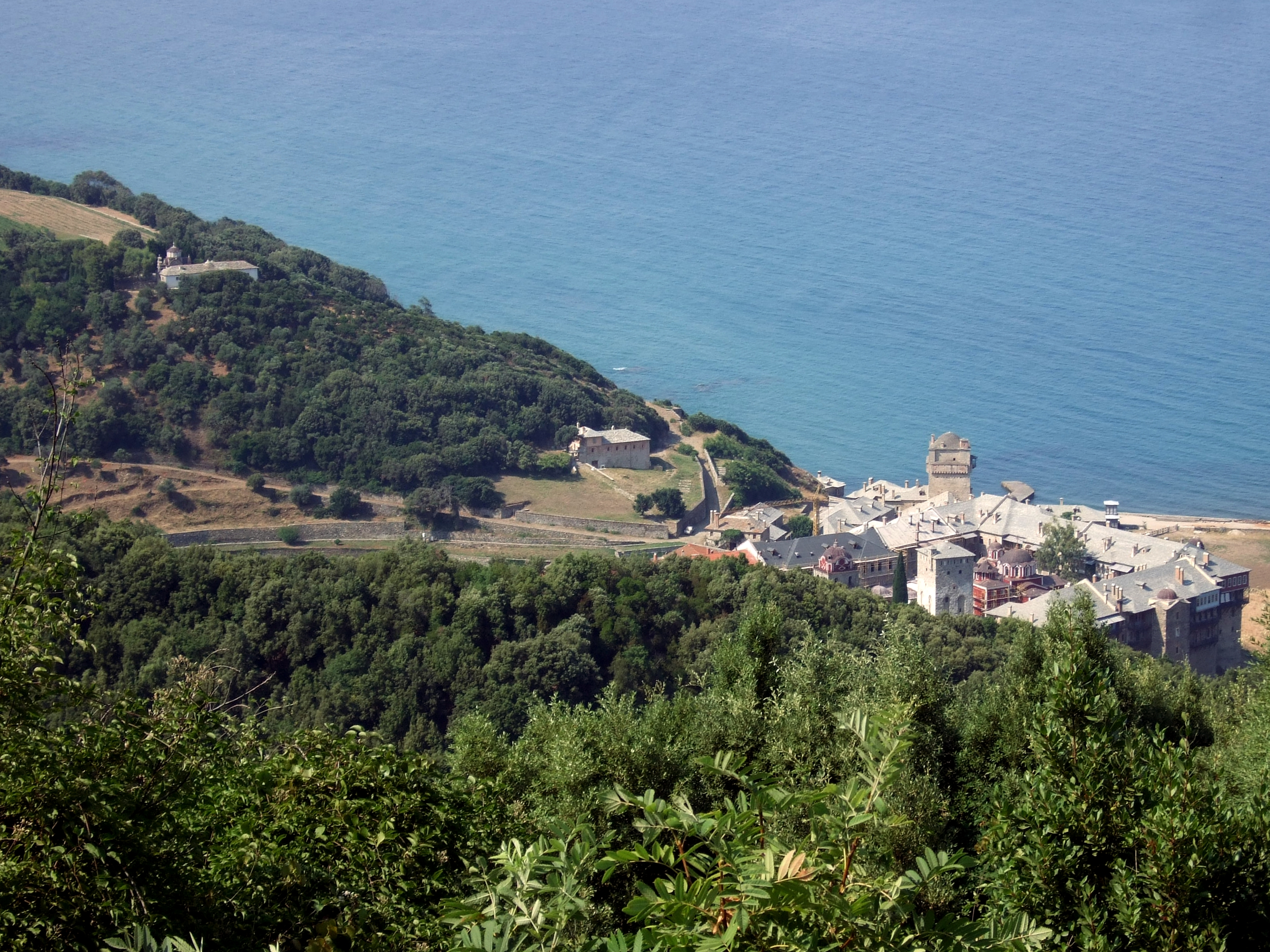
View of the sea
