= Pausicacus of Synada =

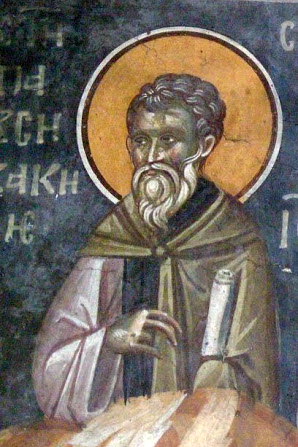
- Icon of St. Pausicacus of Synada (12th century fresco)
- Born: 5th century Apamea (modern-day Syria)
- Died: c. 606; Synnada in Phrygia (modern-day Şuhut, Afyonkarahisar, Turkey)
- Venerated in: Eastern Orthodoxy; Oriental Orthodoxy
- Feast: May 26 (Eastern Christianity)
- Attributes: Vested as a bishop.

Pausicacus of Synada was a Christian saint, monk, ascetic, and bishop of Synada. The saint's name, in Greek Παυσίκακος, derives from the words παῦσις (pavsis) ("to stop, to cease") and κακία (kakia) ("evil, misfortune"); it means "to stop evil".

== Biography ==
The motherland of Saint Pausicacus of Synada was a city called Apamea, which was situated in the southwest Syria.

Pausicacus was born in a noble and pious family. When he was a child, he began to live as an ascetic – he spent almost all his time praying. At the age of twenty-five, he became a monk. Living on only a little water and bread, Pausicacus was given a gift of healing, and he began to cure bodily and mental illnesses.

As time went on, there are rumors that he could exorcise demons from people, restore vision to the blind and perform a lot of other marvels. At last, these rumors reached the Patriarch of Constantinople, Cyriacus (592 – 606). The Patriarch called the monk to Constantinople and ordained him a bishop, appointing him bishop of Synada, which was north of Phrygia. As soon as Saint Pausicacus became a bishop, he began to banish heretics and freethinkers and people who persisted in immorality from his congregation. When he became famous in Phrygia by his care of his congregation, he traveled to Constantinople, where he healed the Emperor Maurice of his illness. For this, the Emperor gave Pausicacus’s province a reward.

When Pausicacus was returning from Constantinople to Synada, he asked the Lord for water to quench the thirst of his companions. At his prayer, a spring of pure water sprang up from the ground.

Saint Pausicacus died in 606. His burial place is unknown.

His name day is celebrated on 26 May.
