= Euthymius the Athonite =

Georgian saint

Saint Euthymius of Athos
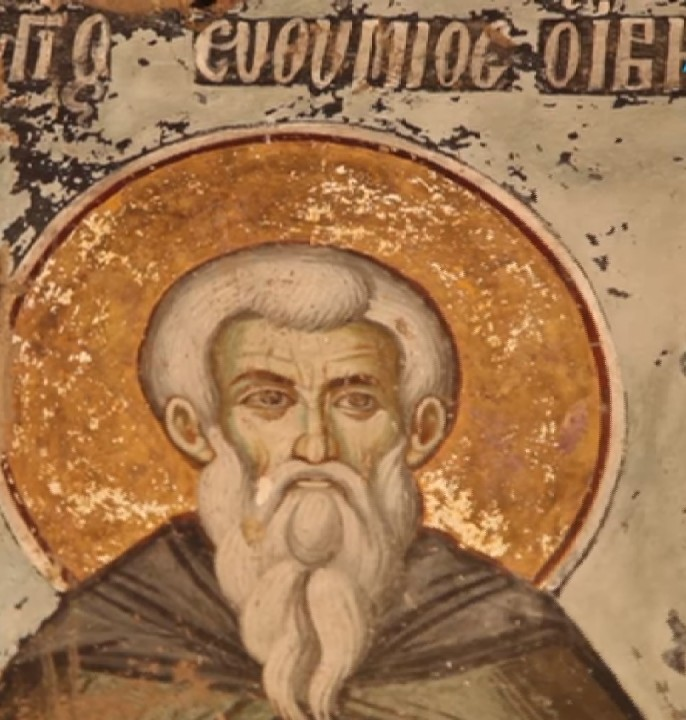
- A fresco of Euthymius from the Protaton Church at Karyes, Mount Athos

Athonite Father
- Born: c. 957; Meskheti, Kingdom of the Iberians
- Died: 1028; Constantinople
- Venerated in: Eastern Orthodox Church
- Feast: May 13
- Patronage: Georgia; Mount Athos

Euthymius the Athonite (Georgian: ექვთიმე ათონელი Ekvtime Atoneli; c. 957–1024) was a Georgian monk, philosopher and scholar, who is venerated as a saint. His feast day in the Orthodox Church is May 13.

Euthymius was a Georgian, the ethnonym used by the Byzantines and Armenians as Iberian. He was born in the principality of Tao-Klarjeti in present-day northeastern Turkey [2]. He came from an aristocratic and military family. As the son of John the Iberian and nephew of John Tornike, Euthymius was taken as a political hostage to Constantinople at a very young age, along with the scions of other aristocratic families, when the emperor handed over a Byzantine borderland to David III Kuropalates, the ruler of Tao-Klarjeti. Around 963, his father, who had already taken the monastic habit, freed him and taught him Greek and Georgian so that he could translate works from Greek into his native language.

== On Mount Athos ==
Subsequently, he followed his father, his cousin George, and a few other Georgian monks to the Great Lavra of Saint Athanasios on Mount Athos. They stayed for 17 years, initially within the monastery and later in some cells (hermitages) granted to them by Saint Athanasios one kilometer away from it. There he began translating from Greek.

In 979/980, they moved to the monydrion (small monastery) of Clement, which they restored and expanded. His father, Saint John, was appointed abbot of the renovated monastery, while the basic works and the new large Katholikon (main church) were completed before 984/985, the year of the death of his uncle, the syncellos Tornike, who was named John as a monk. Tornike funded the restoration. Abbot John organized a scriptorium in the monastery, for both Greek and Georgian. (In fact, in 985 he brought some Georgian and Greek monks from Constantinople, among them calligraphers such as the saints Arsenios, Bishop of Ninotsminda, and John Grdzelidze.) Euthymius translated from the Greek original, and his Georgian disciples copied the essays he handed over to them calligraphically, while the Greek scribes copied the borrowed manuscripts before returning them. When his father grew old (in 995 or 996), he assigned part of his duties to Euthymius.

Sts John, Euthymius and George, Founders of Iviron Monastery (portable icon, 16th cent.). St Euthymius in left.

== Abbot ==
Upon his father's death in 1005, he assumed the abbacy. For the first ten years, he administered the monastery alone. From 1016 until his resignation in 1019, he had assigned some of his duties to his cousin, Saint George. During his days, the monastery acquired great fame on Mount Athos and beyond, so that from being called the Monastery of Clement it began to be called the Monastery of Kyr Euthymius, or of the Iberians, and finally of Iviron (the Georgians), from 1015 until today. Saint Athanasios the Athonite had appointed him in his will as trustee of the Great Lavra, after his father. Thus, he went to Constantinople to settle affairs concerning his own monastery as well as the Great Lavra with the imperial court. Being widely known, Emperor Basil II offered him the position of Archbishop of Cyprus, but he refused.

== Resignation and Death ==
In 1019, he resigned from the abbacy to focus on translations. He translated more than one hundred patristic and hagiographical works from Greek to Georgian, and two works from Georgian to Greek. One of them is Sibrdzne balavarisa (The Wisdom of Balahvar), which is a Christianized adaptation of certain episodes from the life of Siddhartha Gautama (the Buddha), which had been translated from Tajik into Georgian. From Euthymius's translation, titled The Life of Barlaam and Josaphat, it was also translated into other languages and became very popular in medieval Europe.

He passed away in Constantinople in 1028, where he had gone to settle affairs of the Great Lavra, when his mule was startled by a beggar and threw him down. His remains were buried in the Church of St. John the Baptist at the Iviron Monastery. Saint George the Hagiorite (who served as abbot during 1042–1056) transferred them to a tomb in the liti (narthex) of the Katholikon, along with the relics of his father and of Saints Arsenios, Bishop of Ninotsminda, and John Grdzelidze. In the 13th century, the four relics were stolen and taken to Italy. In 2000, as a gesture of goodwill, the Italian Roman Catholic Church donated part of his relics to the Orthodox Valamo Monastery in Finland.

== Influence and Veneration as a Saint ==
Euthymius was fluent in Georgian and Greek and also handled several other languages. He was the initiator of "Hellenophilia", meaning the literal translation of Greek texts into Georgian, as opposed to the free adaptations that had preceded it. He created a translation school that produced many translators at the Iviron Monastery until the early 12th century, and subsequently in Georgia. Thus, he emerged as one of the most prominent Orthodox theologians, translators, and scholars of his time.

He is considered the greatest scholar in the history of Georgia, and the translation school he founded has decisively influenced Georgian culture. The renowned Georgian philologist Korneli Kekelidze wrote regarding the school of Saint Euthymius:

Without the Athonite center, the development of Georgian literature would have taken a completely different direction. It was the forging ground that synthesized Byzantine theological and philosophical achievements with the local vernacular, standardizing the literary Georgian language and saving crucial works from absolute oblivion.

Georgians have surnamed him the Illuminator and the New Chrysostom. His memory is commemorated on May 13th by both the Orthodox and the Roman Catholic Churches.

== Sources ==
- Theodor Dowling, Sketches of Georgian Church History, Adamant Media Corporation (October 9, 2003), ISBN 1-4212-2891-2
