= John the Iberian =

Georgian saint

Saint John the Iberian
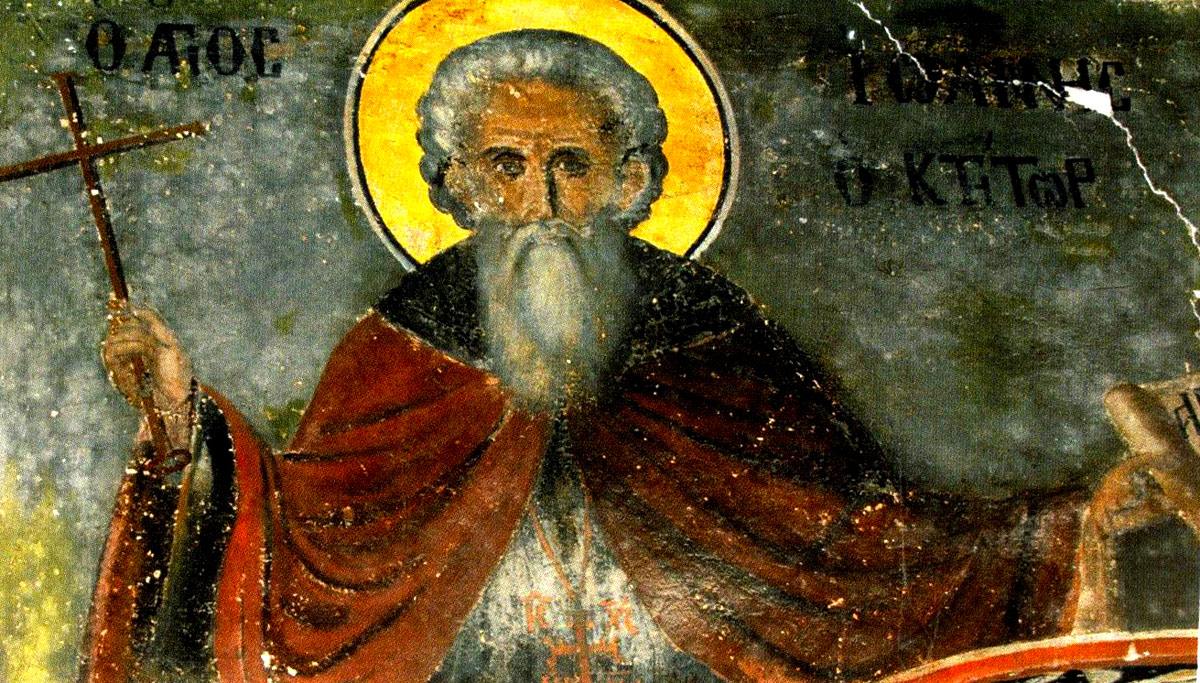
- Fresco of John the Iberian at Iviron on Mount Athos

Athonite Father
- Born: Principality of Tao-Klarjeti
- Died: 1005; Mount Athos
- Venerated in: Roman Catholic Church; Eastern Orthodox Church
- Feast: July 12 and May 13
- Patronage: Georgia; Mount Athos

John the Iberian (Note: also known as John the Georgian, John the Hagiorite, and John Iweron.) (Georgian: იოანე მთაწმინდელი; died c. 1002) was a Georgian monk and Orthodox saint, venerated for his piety and leadership on Mount Athos. He was one of the founders of Iviron monastery, a major center of Georgian monastic culture on Athos. His moniker (the Iberian) refers to his origin, which was from the Georgian principality of Tao-Klarjeti, in present-day northeastern Turkey.

== Early Years ==
John came from a Georgian noble military family and was named Abulcherit. He married in the 950s and served as a soldier. In the early 960s, he became a monk at the Monastery of the Four Churches in Tao-Klarjeti. However, he soon moved to a monastery on Mount Olympus in Bithynia. There he learned that his son Euthymius—known as Euthymius the Athonite, the Iberian, or the Illuminator (Euthymius Opliseren)— had been given as a political hostage to Constantinople, along with the scions of other aristocratic families, when the emperor handed over a Byzantine borderland to David III Kuropalates, the ruler of Tao-Klarjeti. This happened around 963, and Euthymius was an adolescent at the time. John managed to free his son, they stayed together, and he taught him Greek and Georgian in order to translate Greek works into Georgian.

== Great Lavra of Mount Athos ==
Between 963 and 969, John, his son Euthymius, his nephew George, along with a few others, settled in the Great Lavra of Mount Athos, which was founded by Saint Athanasios the Athonite in 963. In the early 970s, their relative (likely a cousin of John's wife), the former general and patrician Tornike, who had been renamed John as a monk, arrived there. Saint Athanasios gave them some cells (hermitages), a thousand paces from the Lavra, to perform their daily services in Georgian. In 978, a sebastophoros, an envoy of the co-emperors Basil II and Constantine VIII, brought John Tornike their order to go to Constantinople. There they asked him to carry their letters to David Kuropalates, asking for his assistance against the rebel Bardas Skleros. They promised to cede certain border territories to David and the spoils of war to Tornike. David provided 12,000 elite cavalrymen to Tornike, who defeated Skleros at the Battle of Sarvenisni in the Byzantine theme of Charsianon on March 24, 979. Tornike gave a portion of the spoils to his soldiers and then went to Constantinople. There the co-emperors granted him the title of syncellos and gifted him two monasteries. John took many Georgian and some Greek monks with him and returned to Athos. Because, due to their number, the Georgian monks could not fit into the cells of the Lavra, they asked for a new place to settle.

== Monastery of Clement (Iviron) ==
Sts John, Euthymius and George, founders of Iviron Monastery (portable icon, 16th cent. Iviron Monastery). St John in the middle

Tornike had brought a huge sum (1,200 pounds of gold) with which they purchased the monydrion (small monastery) of Clement in 979 or 980, along with five others. They united the area, expanded the wings of the monastery of Clement, built a new church over the old Katholikon (main church) of Saint John the Baptist, and erected a new magnificent Katholikon in the name of the Theotokos. The monastery became second in rank on Mount Athos and acquired many metochions in the region of Central Macedonia. After 1015, it acquired the name of their nation and has since been known as the Iviron Monastery (i.e., of the Georgians). The Katholikon and the wings of the monastery were completed before Tornike's death (984/5). John also organized a scriptorium, with Georgian and Greek (the only known one being Theophanes) scribes. He had assigned his son Euthymius to translate patristic and hagiographical works from Greek into Georgian. Euthymius translated from the original Greek, and his disciples copied his translations from the draft. In 985 he traveled to Constantinople. On his return, he brought with him Georgian monks from noble families (some of whom were scribes, such as Saints Arsenios of Ninotsminda and John Grdzelidze) as well as Greek monks. He devoted himself to the organization of the monastery until 995, when he entrusted part of his duties to his son Euthymius and another part to his nephew George. However, he continued to oversee the work of the scriptorium. At the same time, he contributed to many affairs of the Great Lavra, mediating at the imperial court, as seen from an autograph act of donationby Saint Athanasios the Athonite from 984. Therefore, in his will, Saint Athanasios appointed him trustee, meaning to settle the problems arising in the Lavra.

== Death and Legacy ==
He passed away on July 14, 1005. He was succeeded by his son Euthymius. His relics, along with those of his son Euthymius, were looted by Frankish pirates during the destruction of the Monastery in 1259 and taken to the West. John was considered a saint even during his lifetime, and he was greatly revered by both Georgians and Greeks. In Georgia, his memory is commemorated on July 12, while in Greece on May 13, the day of the death of Saint Euthymius, along with the memory of the latter and his nephew Saint George. Athanasius of Athos wrote about him:

The God-fearing monk John, after he had come unto our mount and had joined himself unto me, a lowly and sinful man, yielding himself unto my unworthiness (according to the commandment of God, and also for the preservation of his own virtue and honourable soul), did shine forth in many and diverse spiritual graces, fulfilling innumerable and exceeding great works in the aforesaid obedience. Wherefore he did minister and profit not only unto God, but also unto me, the lowly, and unto all our Christly brotherhood, in such wise as none other hath ever done.

His contributions to the founding and strengthening of the monastic tradition on Mount Athos were widely recognized by his contemporaries. Hymns were composed in his honor, and two of these, dated to the first half of the 12th century, have survived to the present day.

== Bibliography ==
- Butler, Alban (1995). Butler's Lives of the Saints. Vol. 7. Liturgical Press: Liturgical Press.
