= October 31 (Eastern Orthodox liturgics) =

Day in the Eastern Orthodox liturgical calendar

Eastern Orthodox liturgical calendar
| October 30 | October 31 | November 1 |
October 31 O.S. ≍ November 13 N.S. October 31 N.S ≍ October 18 O.S.

An Eastern Orthodox cross

October 31 in Eastern Orthodox liturgical calendars is a feast day and a day of commemoration of saints and martyrs. Although some Orthodox churches use the Revised Julian Calendar and others use the traditional Julian calendar, the fixed commemorations for their respective October 31 are broadly the same, no matter which calendar is used. (Note: Despite the dates being the same, the days to which they refer typically differ by 13 days. The notation Old Style or O.S. is sometimes used to indicate a date in the traditional Julian Calendar (the "Old Calendar"). The notation New Style or N.S. indicates a date in the Revised Julian calendar (the "New Calendar").)

== Saints ==
- Apostles of the Seventy: Stachys, Amplias, Urban, Narcissus, Apelles and Aristobulus (1st century) (Note: "The same day, the Saints Ampliatus, Urbanus and Narcissus, who are mentioned by St. Paul in his epistle to the Romans. They were put to death by the Jews and Gentiles for the Gospel of Christ.")
- Martyr Epimachus of Pelusium, at Alexandria (c. 250)
- Saint Maura of Constantinople (436)
- Martyrs Epimachus the Roman and his companion Gordianos (361-363) (see also: May 9)
- Saint Jacob of Nisibis the Worderworker, Bishop of Antiochia Mygdoniae (4th century)
- Martyrs Seleucius and Stratonica his wife, myrrh-gushers.
- Martyrs Stephen, Barnabas, Trophimus, Dorymedon, Cosmas, Damian, Sabbas, Bassa, Abramios, and others with them. (see also: September 19)
- The Holy Twelve Daughters. (Note: Martyred by being hung in the middle of the Stoa.)
- The Holy Three Martyrs of Melitene.
- The Holy Child Martyr. (Note: They martyred him by breaking his skull with large stones.)

== Pre-Schism Western saints ==
- Saint Quentin (Quinctinus), martyr. (Note: According to tradition, Quentin was born in Rome and went to France. He enlightened the area round Amiens and was martyred at the town now called Saint-Quentin.) (Note: "At Saint-Quentin, in France, St. Quinctinus, Roman citizen and senator, who endured martyrdom under the emperor Maximian. By the revelation of an angel, his body was found incorrupt after the lapse of fifty-five years.")
- Saint Erth (Erc of Slane, Herygh, Urith) (6th century) (Note: Brother of St Uny and St Ia (Ives). He went from Ireland to Cornwall, where a church is dedicated to him, and also gave his name to the village of St Erth.) (see also: November 2)
- Monk-martyr Foillan, Irish missionary, of Burgh Castle (East Anglia) and Fosse (Gaul) (655) (Note: Brother of Sts Fursey and Ultan. They left Ireland for East Anglia in England. St Foillan became the Abbot of Burgh Castle near Yarmouth but when this monastery was destroyed, he went to Belgium. St Ita of Nivelles gave him land at Fosses where he founded a monastery. He enlightened Brabant but was killed by robbers and is venerated as a martyr.) (Note: "ST. FOILAN was a native of Ireland, and came with his brothers, St. Fursey and St. Ultan, into England, where they founded the religious house of Burghcastle, in Suffolk. When St. Fursey retired to the Continent, he left St. Foilan and others to govern in his stead. In the course of time he also left England, and established the Monastery of Fosse, on a site given to him by St. Gertrude of Nivielle. He was consecrated Bishop by Pope Martin I, with a commission to preach to the infidels. In the zealous exercise of this work he received the crown of martyrdom at their hands.")
- Saint Antoninus, called Fontana, Archbishop of Milan, Confessor (660)
- Saint Begu, a nun at Hackness in Yorkshire in England (c. 660) (Note: "ST. BEGH, or BEE (in Latin BEGA), was of Irish parentage, and fled to England to escape a marriage which her parents had planned for her, having the holy purpose of consecrating her virginity to God. On her first landing, she is said to have found refuge on the promontory still known as St. Bee's Head, in Cumberland, where in after-years there was a cell of monks, depending on the Abbey of St. Mary's, in York. Bega received the religious habit from the Bishop St. Aidan, and is reported to have been the first so professed in Britain. The subsequent history of her life is unknown, unless she be the same with St. Hieu, or the Begu, mentioned by St. Bede, as some have supposed.)
- Saint Notburga, a nun at the convent of St Mary in the Capitol in Cologne in Germany (c. 714)
- Saint Arnulf, a monk at Novalese in Piedmont in Italy, martyred by the Saracens (c. 840)
- Saint Wolfgang of Regensburg, Bishop of Regensburg (994) (Note: Born in Swabia in Germany, he became a monk at Einsiedeln Abbey in Switzerland (964). In 971 he was ordained and with a group of monks went to convert the Magyars, but in 972 he was made Bishop of Regensburg. He was a great benefactor of the poor.)

== Post-Schism Orthodox saints ==
- Venerable Spyridon and Nicodemus the Prosphora-bakers, of the Kiev Caves (1148) (Note: (in Ukrainian) Спиридон Проскурник. Вікіпедії (Ukrainian Wikipedia).)
- Saint Anatolius, recluse of the Near Caves in Kiev (12th century)
- 100,000 Martyrs of Tbilisi slain under Jalal al-Din (1227)
- New Martyr Nicholas of Chios (1754)
- Righteous Petro Kalnyshevsky, Koshevoy-Commander of the Zaporozhian Cossacks (1803) (Note: On December 23, 2014, the Holy Synod of the Ukrainian Orthodox Church blessed the local glorification and veneration of Righteous Peter Kalnyshevsky.)

== New martyrs and confessors ==
- New Hieromartyr John Kochurov, Archpriest, of Chicago and St. Petersburg, First Hieromartyr of the Bolshevik Yoke (1917)
- New Hieromartyr Leonid (Molchanov), Abbot of the Sovlvychegodsk Monastery, Vologda (1918)
- New Hieromartyrs (1937):

- Sergius, Archbishop of Yeletsky.
- Vsevolod Smirnov, Protopresbyter, of Moscow.
- Alexis Sibersky of Tver, and of Moscow, priest. (Note: See: (in Russian) Алексий Сибирский. Википедии. (Russian Wikipedia).)
- Alexander Vozdvizhensky and Sergius Rozanov, priests.
- Basil Archangelsky, priest. (Note: See: (in Russian) Архангельский, Василий Васильевич. Википедии. (Russian Wikipedia).)
- Euphrosynus (Antonov), Hieromonk of the Seven Lakes Monastery, Kazan.
- Anatole (Botvinnikov), Hieromonk, of Dubrovskoye, Tver.

- New Martyr Jacob Blatov (1937)
- New Hieromartyr Innocent (Mazurin), Hierodeacon, of Buygorod, Volokolamsk (1938) (Note: See: (in Russian) Иннокентий (Мазурин). Википедии. (Russian Wikipedia).)

== Other commemorations ==
- Commemoration of an Anonymous Apologist, under Julian the Apostate (c. 361) (Note: This saint lived in the reign of Julian the Apostate (361), and was the son of a pagan priest. A certain pious Christian Deaconess brought him to the faith in Christ, who was a friend of his mother. He suffered severe tortures in the beginning, when his father learned of this. He miraculously survived however, and after Julian the Apostate died, he managed to bring his elderly father to the Christian faith and many other young pagans. He then lived a strict ascetical life and reposed in peace.)
- Consecration of the Patriarchal Prayer Chapel. (Note: Recorded in the Patmian Codex.)
- Martyrdom of José Muñoz Cortés, keeper of the "Montreal" copy of the Panagia Portaitissa icon, in Athens (1997) (Note: In October 1997, during one of his trips with the icon, Muñoz was tortured and murdered in a hotel room in Athens, Greece, during the overnight hours of 30 or 31 October.) (see also: October 18)

== Icon gallery ==
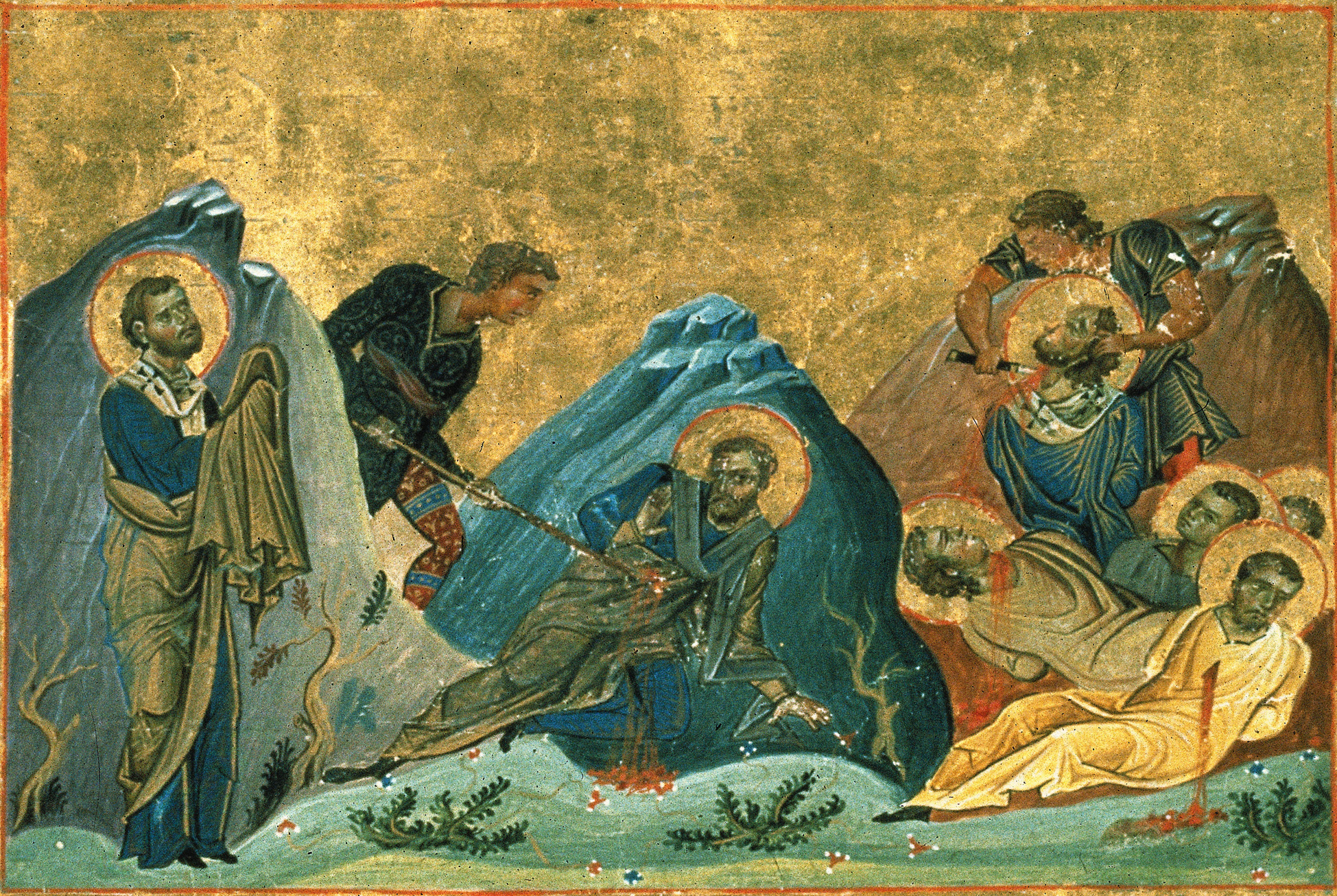
Apostles Stachys, Amplias and Urban.
(Menologion of Basil II, 10th century).

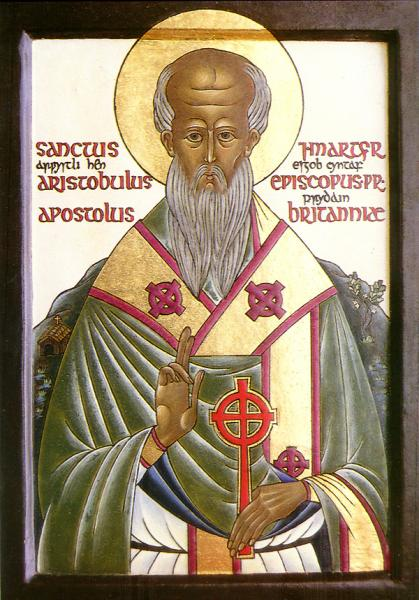
Aristobulus of Britannia.

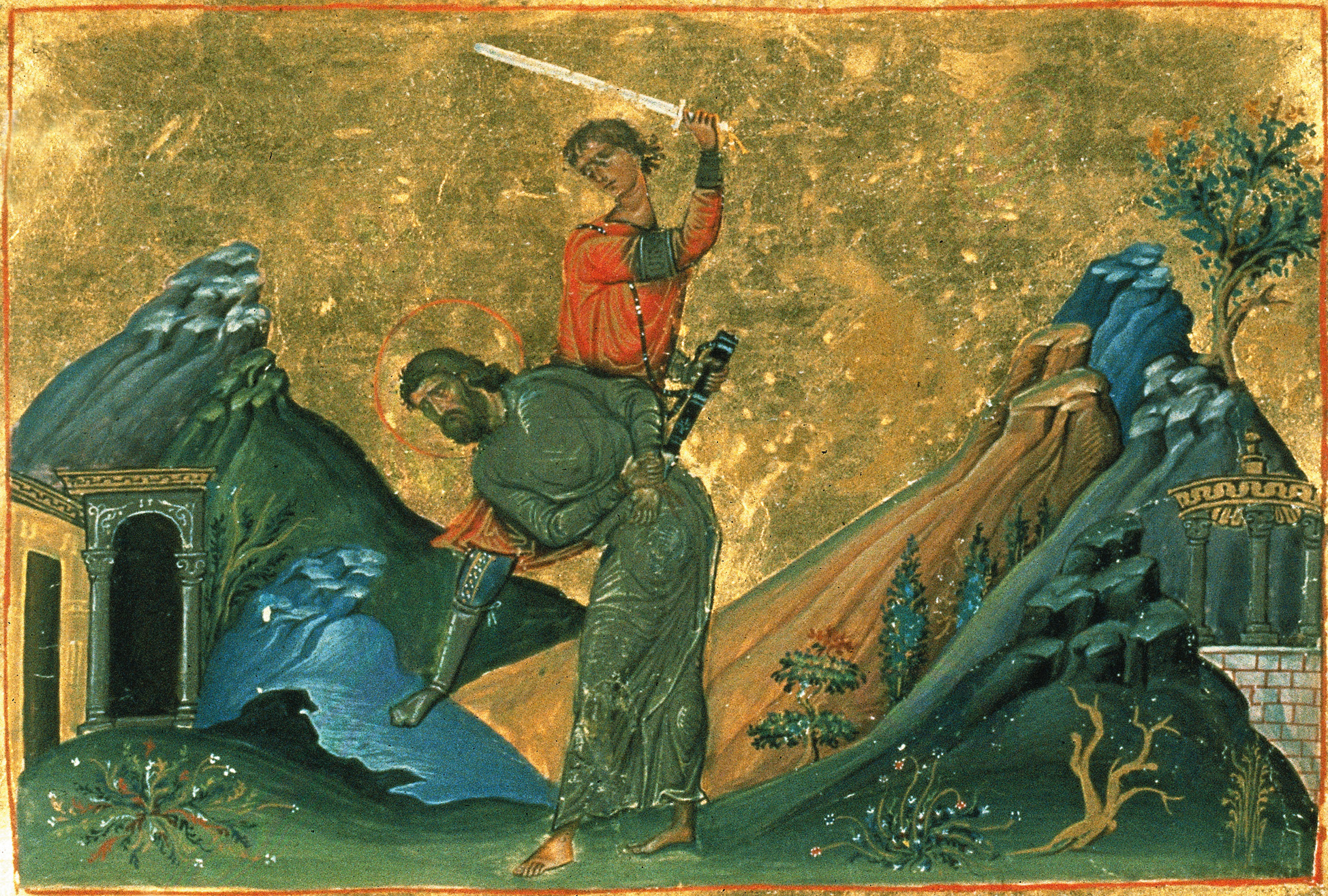
Martyr Epimachus of Pelusium.
(Menologion of Basil II, 10th century).

An angel appears to Saint Jacob of Nisibis in his sleep, on the slope of Mount Ararat, with a piece from Noah's Ark.

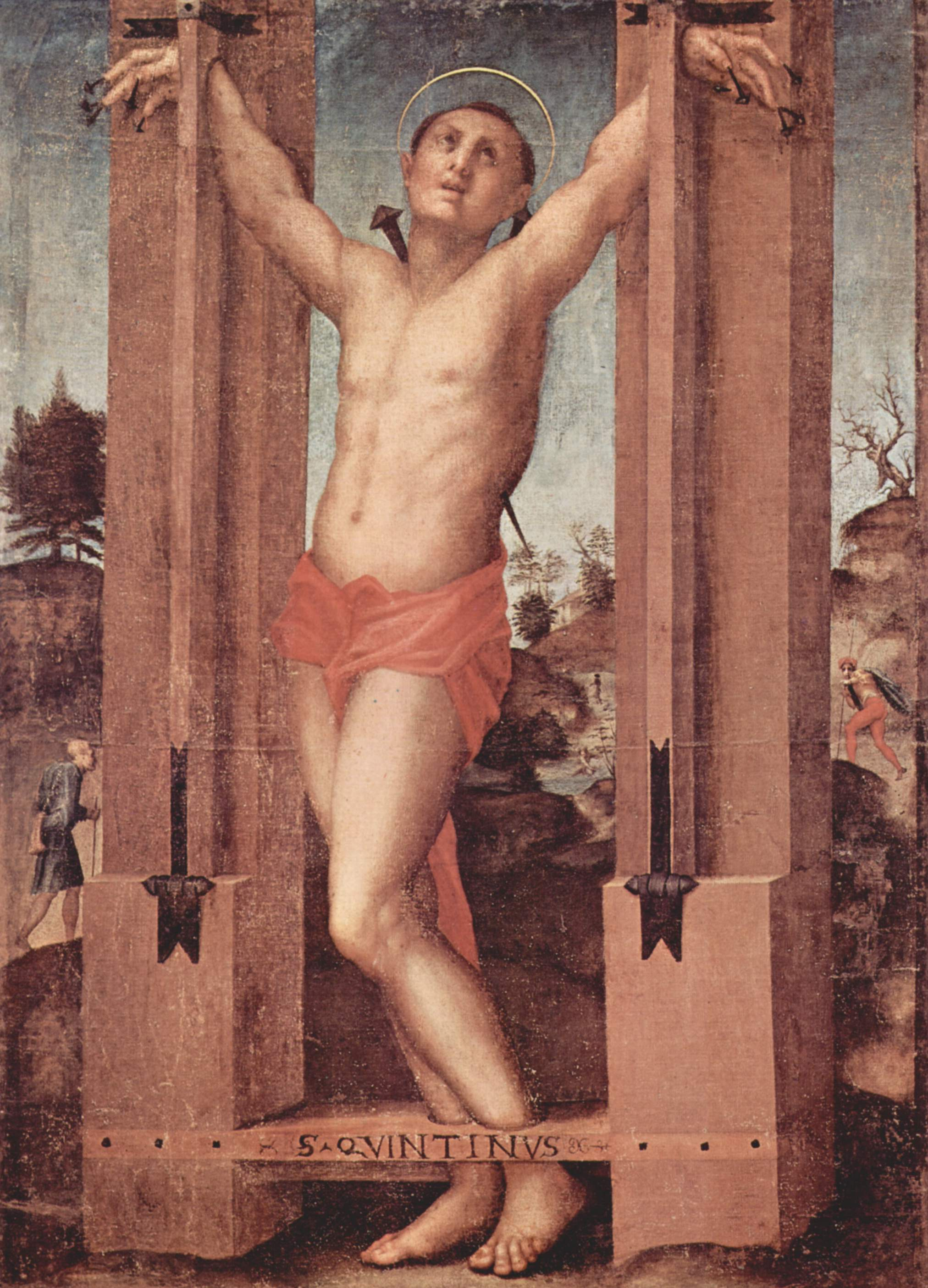
Saint Quentin.

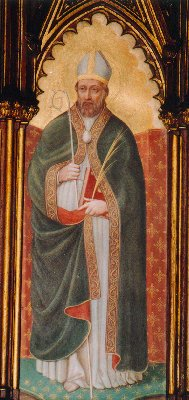
Monk-martyr Foillan, Irish missionary.

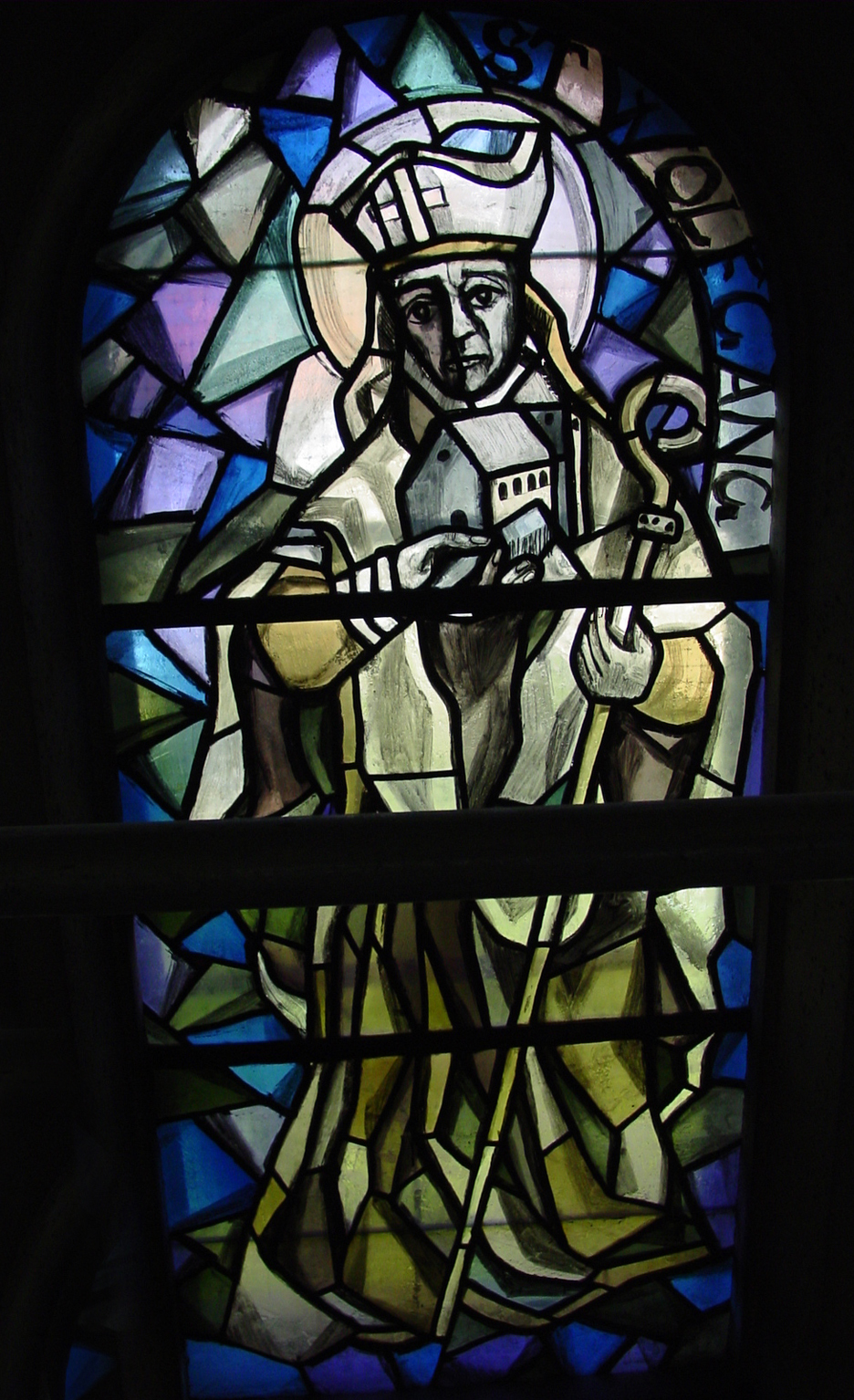
St, Wolfgang of Regensburg, the Almoner.

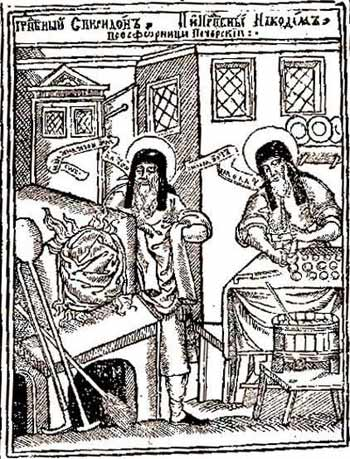
Ven. Spyridon and Nicodemus the Prosphora-bakers, of the Kiev Caves.

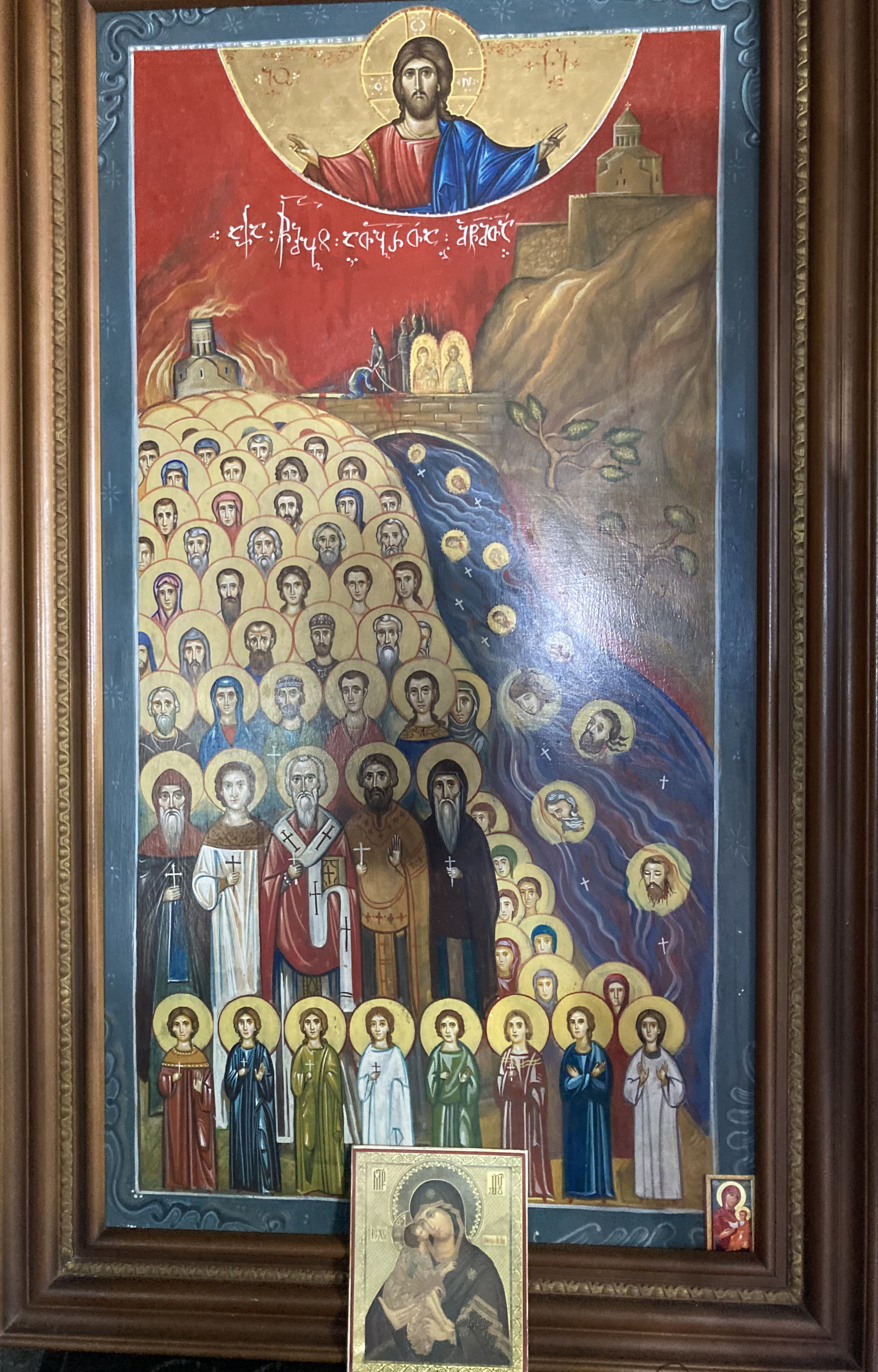
Icon of the 100,000 Martyrs of Tbilisi.
(Church of Saint Nicholas, Batumi, Georgia).

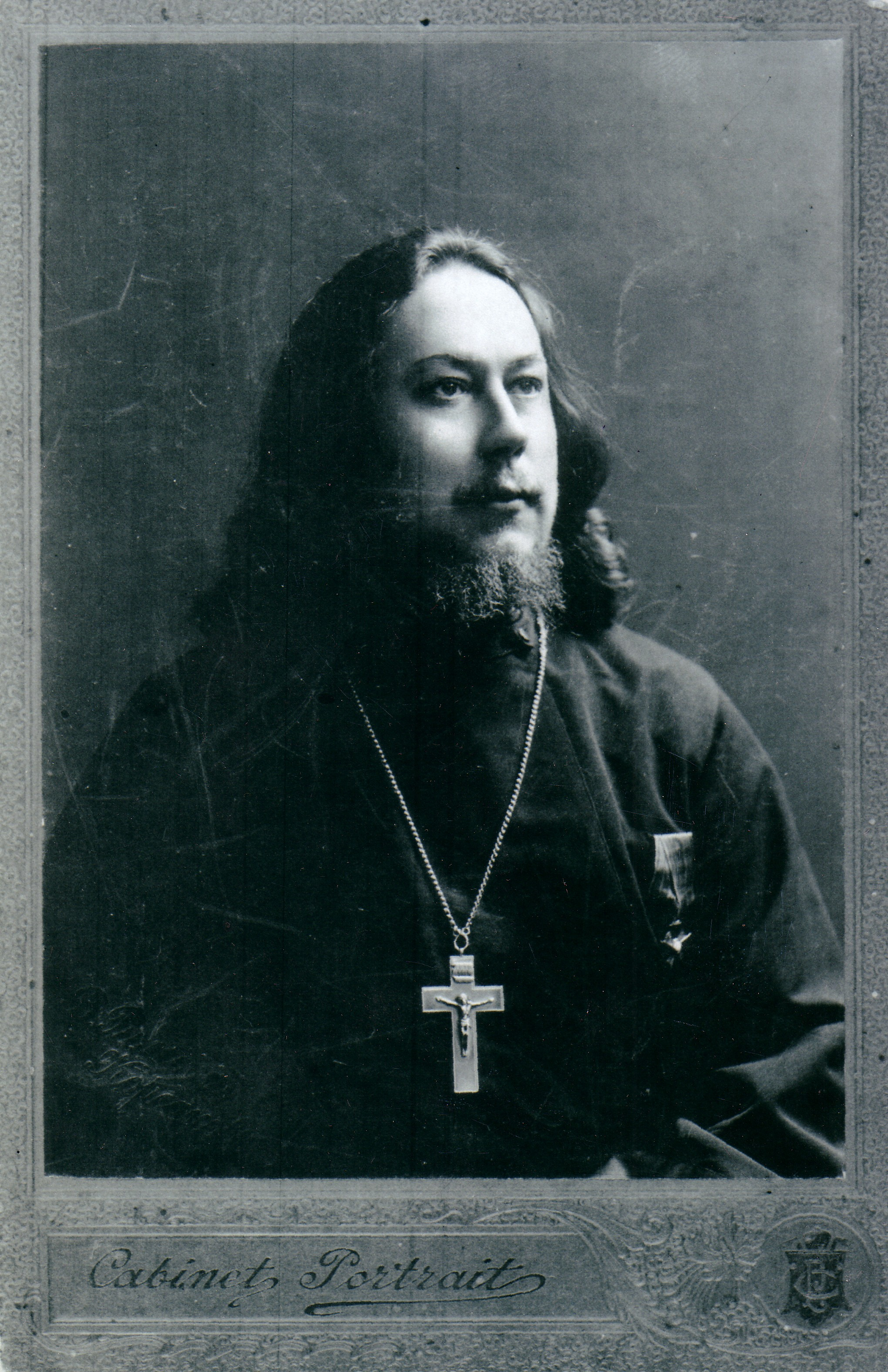
New Hieromartyr John Kochurov.

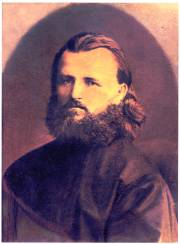
New Hieromartyr Alexis Sibersky of Tver.

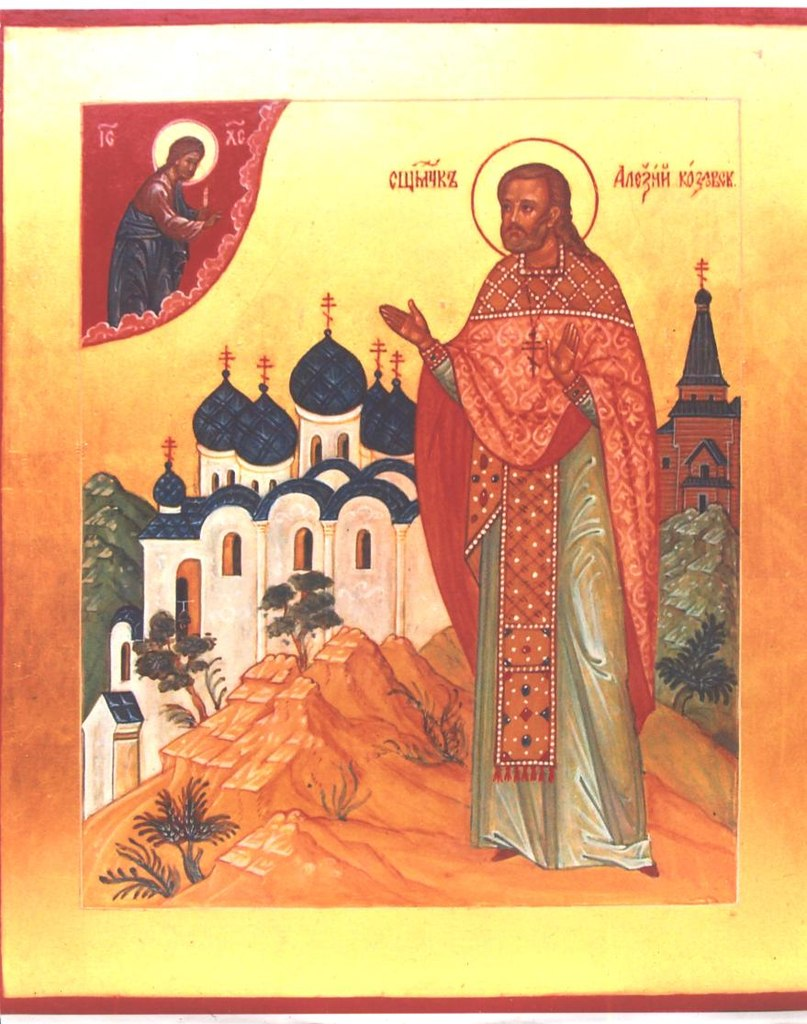
New Hieromartyr Alexis Sibersky of Tver.

New Hieromartyr Basil Archangelsky, Archpriest.

New Hieromartyr Innocent (Mazurin), Hierodeacon.

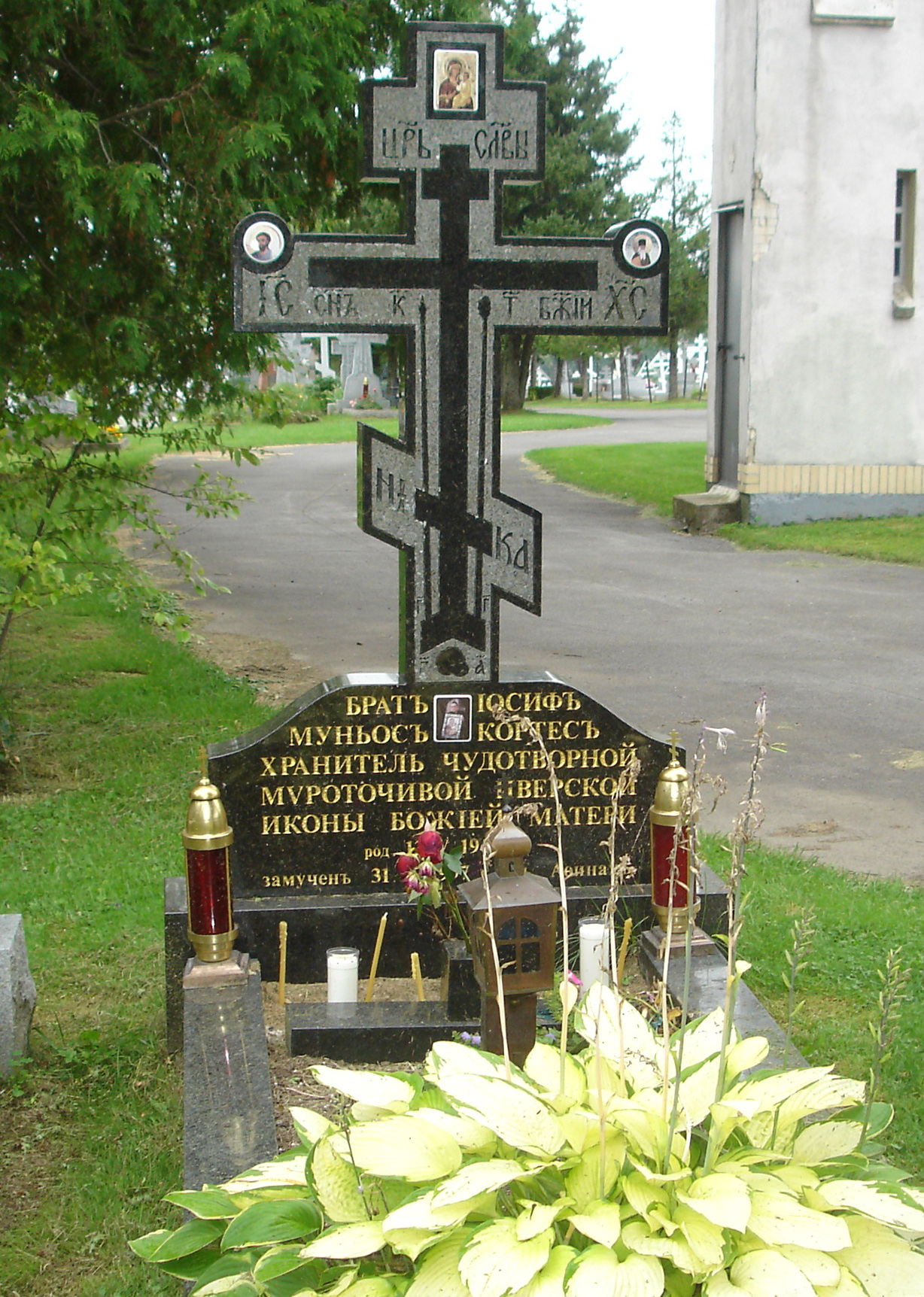
The grave of Brother José Muñoz Cortés, keeper of the Iveron-Montreal Icon of the Theotokos.

== Sources ==
- October 31/November 13. Orthodox Calendar (pravoslavie.ru).
- November 13 / October 31. Holy Trinity Russian Orthodox Church (A parish of the Patriarchate of Moscow).
- October 31. OCA - The Lives of the Saints.
- The Autonomous Orthodox Metropolia of Western Europe and the Americas (ROCOR). St. Hilarion Calendar of Saints for the year of our Lord 2004. St. Hilarion Press (Austin, TX). p. 81.
- The Thirty-First Day of the Month of October. Orthodoxy in China.
- October 31. Latin Saints of the Orthodox Patriarchate of Rome.
- The Roman Martyrology. Transl. by the Archbishop of Baltimore. Last Edition, According to the Copy Printed at Rome in 1914. Revised Edition, with the Imprimatur of His Eminence Cardinal Gibbons. Baltimore: John Murphy Company, 1916. p. 335-336.
- Rev. Richard Stanton. A Menology of England and Wales, or, Brief Memorials of the Ancient British and English Saints Arranged According to the Calendar, Together with the Martyrs of the 16th and 17th Centuries. London: Burns & Oates, 1892. pp. 519–520.

Greek Sources

- Great Synaxaristes: (in Greek) 31 ΟΚΤΩΒΡΙΟΥ. ΜΕΓΑΣ ΣΥΝΑΞΑΡΙΣΤΗΣ.
- (in Greek) Συναξαριστής. 31 Οκτωβρίου. ECCLESIA.GR. (H ΕΚΚΛΗΣΙΑ ΤΗΣ ΕΛΛΑΔΟΣ).
- (in Greek) 31/10/2015. Ορθόδοξος Συναξαριστής.

Russian Sources

- (in Russian) 13 ноября (31 октября). Православная Энциклопедия под редакцией Патриарха Московского и всея Руси Кирилла (электронная версия). (Orthodox Encyclopedia - Pravenc.ru).
- (in Russian) 31 октября по старому стилю / 13 ноября по новому стилю. Русская Православная Церковь - Православный церковный календарь на 2018 год.
