= July 28 (Eastern Orthodox liturgics) =

Day in the Eastern Orthodox liturgical calendar

Eastern Orthodox liturgical calendar
July 27	July 28	July 29
July 28 O.S. ≍ August 10 N.S. July 28 N.S ≍ July 15 O.S.

An Eastern Orthodox cross

July 28 in Eastern Orthodox liturgical calendars is a feast day and a day of commemoration of saints and martyrs. Although some Orthodox churches use the Revised Julian Calendar and others use the traditional Julian calendar, the fixed commemorations for their respective July 28 are broadly the same, no matter which calendar is used. (Note: Despite the dates being the same, the days to which they refer typically differ by 13 days. The notation Old Style or O.S. is sometimes used to indicate a date in the traditional Julian Calendar (the "Old Calendar"). The notation New Style or N.S. indicates a date in the Revised Julian calendar (the "New Calendar").)

== Saints ==
- Holy Apostles of the Seventy and Deacons (1st century): (Note: Name days celebrated today include: Timon, Timos (Τίμωνας, Τίμος).)

- Prochorus, Nicanor, Timon, and Parmenas.

- Martyr Julian of Dalmatia (c. 138-161)
- Martyr Eustathius the Soldier, of Ancyra (c. 316) (Note: "At Ancyra, in Galatia, the holy martyr Eustathius. After various torments, he was plunged into a river, but being delivered by an angel, was finally called to his reward by a dove coming from heaven.")
- Martyr Acacius of Miletus (c. 321) (Note: "At Miletus, in the time of the emperor Licinius, the holy martyr Acatius, who completed his martyrdom by having his head struck off, after having undergone different torments and been thrown into a furnace, from which he came out uninjured through the assistance of God.")
- Martyr Drosis (Drosida, Drosa), by being cast into a golden crucible. (Note: Name days celebrated today include: Drosida, Drosoula, Drosis, Drucis, Drew (Δροσίς).) (see also: March 22)
- Martyr Auxentios, of Laodicea in Phrygia.
- Venerable Irene Chrysovolantou of Cappadocia, Abbess of Chrysovalantou (912) (Note: Kontakion of the Righteous One. Third Tone: Leaving all the world behind, with its impermanent glory, thou wast wedded unto Christ, the King immortal and holy, bringing Him as precious dowry thy maiden beauty and thy trophies won through abstinence over demons. O Irene, our righteous Mother, entreat thy Bridegroom to show His mercy to us.") (Note: In some parishes it is customary to bless apples on the feast of Saint Irene Chrysovalantou.) (Note: Name days celebrated today include: Chrisovalantis (Χρυσοβαλάντης).)
- Venerable Paul of Xeropotamou, on Mount Athos (820 or 996)
- Saint George the Builder, of Iveron, Mt. Athos (1029 or 1033)

== Pre-Schism Western saints ==
- Martyrs Nazarius and Celsus, martyrs in Milan in Italy under Nero (c. 68) (Note: "At Milan, the birthday of the holy martyrs Nazarius and a boy named Celsus. While the persecution excited by Nero was raging, they were beheaded by Anolinus, after long sufferings and afflictions endured in prison.") (see also: October 14)
- Saint Victor I, born in North Africa, he was Pope of Rome for ten years from 189-198 (198) (Note: "AT Rome, the martyrdom of St. Victor, pope and martyr.")
- Saint Peregrinus, a priest near Lyon in France at the time of St Irenaeus and during the persecution under Severus (2nd century) (Note: He lived as a hermit on an island in the River Saône.) (Note: "At Lyons, St. Peregrinus, priest, whose happiness in heaven is attested by glorious miracles.")
- Saint Camelian, successor of St Lupus as Bishop of Troyes in France from 478 (c. 525)
- Saints Ursus and Leobatius (Leubais), Brother-Abbots, of Gaul (c. 500) (see also: July 30)
- Saint Samson of Dol, Bishop of Dol, in Brittany (c. 565) (Note: Born in Wales, he became a disciple of St Illtyd at Llantwit Major and then for a time was monk and abbot of the monastery on Caldey Island. He left Caldey and visited Ireland. Then he went to Cornwall and was consecrated bishop by St Dubricius. Finally he crossed to Brittany and spent the rest of his life enlightening that country, basing himself at Dol. He was one of the greatest missionaries of his century.) (Note: "In Bretagne, St. Sampson, bishop and confessor.")
- Saint Banthus of Trier, Bishop of Trier in Germany (7th century) (see also: July 25)
- Saint Arduinus (Ardwyne), patron-saint of Trepino in the south of Italy (7th century) (Note: According to some he was one of four English pilgrims who reposed in this region in the seventh century.) (Note: See: (in Italian) Arduino di Ceprano. Wikipedia. (Italian Wikipedia).)
- Saint Lucidus of Aquara, a monk of St Peter's near Aquara, in the south of Italy (c. 938) (Note: See: (in Italian) Lucido di Aquara. Wikipedia. (Italian Wikipedia).)
- Saint Lyutius, a monk at Montecassino who died as a hermit at La Cava Abbey in Italy (c. 1038)

== Post-Schism Orthodox saints ==
- Venerable Moses of the Kiev Caves, Wonderworker (13th-14th centuries) (Note: See: (in Ukrainian) Мойсей Чудотворець. Википедии. (Ukrainian Wikipedia).)
- Saint Anthony, Bishop of Rostov, Yaroslavl, and Belozersk (1336)
- New Martyr David of Aleppo (1660)
- Saint Pitirim, Bishop of Tambov (1698) (Note: See: (in Russian) Питирим (епископ Тамбовский). Википедии. (Russian Wikipedia).)
- New Martyr Christodoulos of Kassandreia (1777)

=== New martyrs and confessors ===
- New Hieromartyr Nicholas Ponomarev, Deacon (1918)
- New Hieromartyr Basil (Erekaev), Hieromonk of Sarov Monastery (1937)
- Virgin-martyrs Anastasia Kamaeva and Helen Astashkina (1937)
- Martyrs Aretha Yeriomkin, John Lomakin, John Selmanov, John Milioshkin (1937)
- Virgin-martyr Maura Moisieva (1937)
- New Hieromartyr Ignatius (Bazyluk) of Jabłeczna, in Chelm and Podlasie, Poland (1942) (Note: See: (in Polish) Ignacy (Bazyluk). Wikipedii. (Polish Wikipedia).) (see also: August 9)

== Other commemorations ==
- Consecration the Temple of the Most Holy Theotokos in the Quarter of Deaconess.
- Synaxis of the Saints of Tambov (1988) (Note: See: (in Russian) Собор Тамбовских святых. Википедии. (Russian Wikipedia).)
- Repose of Abbess Daria of Sezenovo Convent (1858) (Note: See: (in Russian) Сезёновский Иоанно-Казанский монастырь. Википедии. (Russian Wikipedia).)
- Translation of the relics of Saint Jacob the New Chozebite (1960) (see also: August 5)

=== Icons ===
- Icon of the Most Holy Theotokos "Directress of Smolensk", brought from Constantinople (1046) (Note: See: (in Russian) Смоленская икона Божией Матери. Википедии. (Russian Wikipedia).)
- Icons of the Most Holy Theotokos "Grebensk" (1380), "Kostroma" (1672), and "Umileniye" ("of Tender Feeling") of Diveyevo Convent (1885), before which St. Seraphim reposed.
- Reverence list of an "Smolensk" Icon of the Mother of God:

- "Ustiug" (1290)
- "Vidropusskaya" (15th century)
- "Voronin" (1524) (see also: June 15)
- "Xristoforov" (16th century)
- "Suprasl", Poland (16th century)
- "Yugskaya" (1615)
- "Igritsky" (1624)
- "Shuiskaya" (1654-55)
- "Sedmiezersk" (Seven Lakes) (17th century)
- "Sergievsk" (Trinity-St. Sergius Lavra) (1730)

== Icon gallery ==
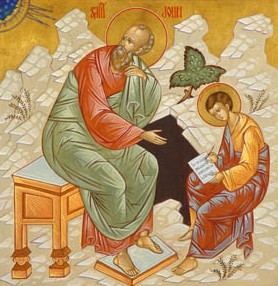
St. John the Evangelist with Prochorus.

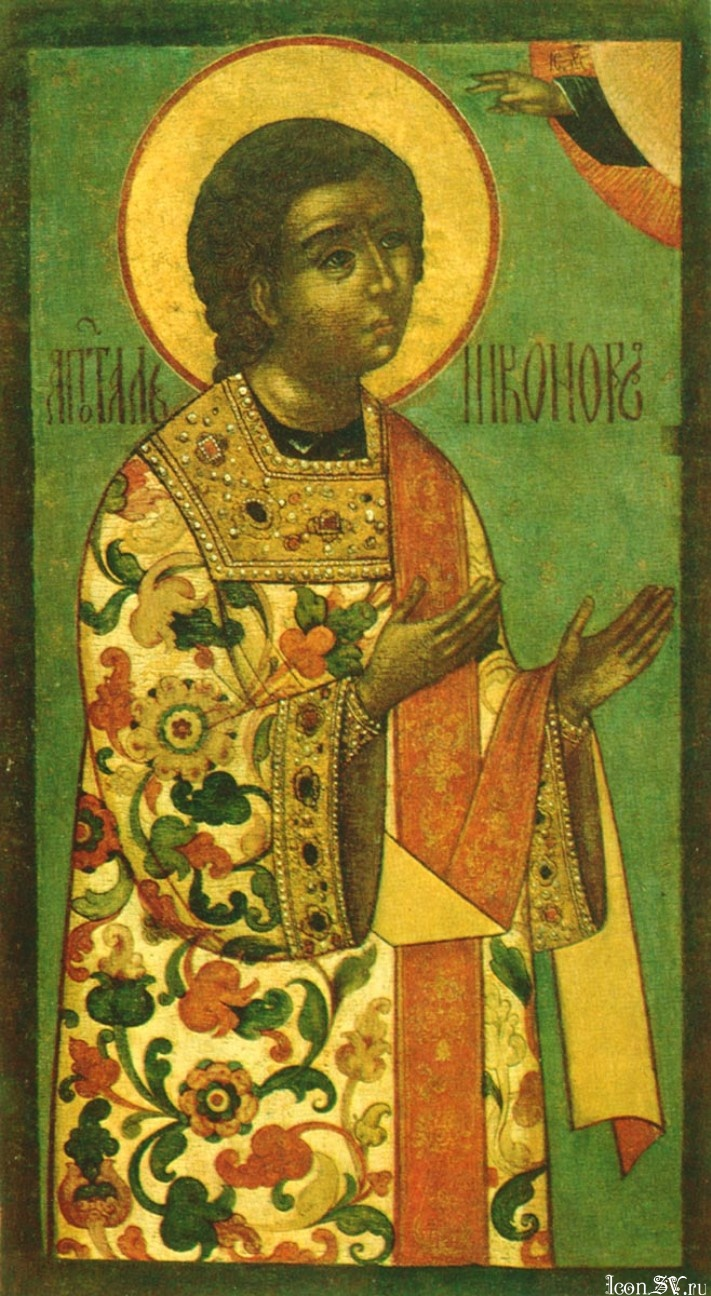
St. Nicanor the Deacon.

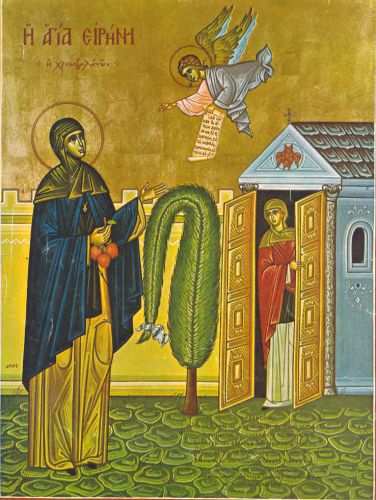
Venerable Irene Chrysovolantou of Cappadocia.

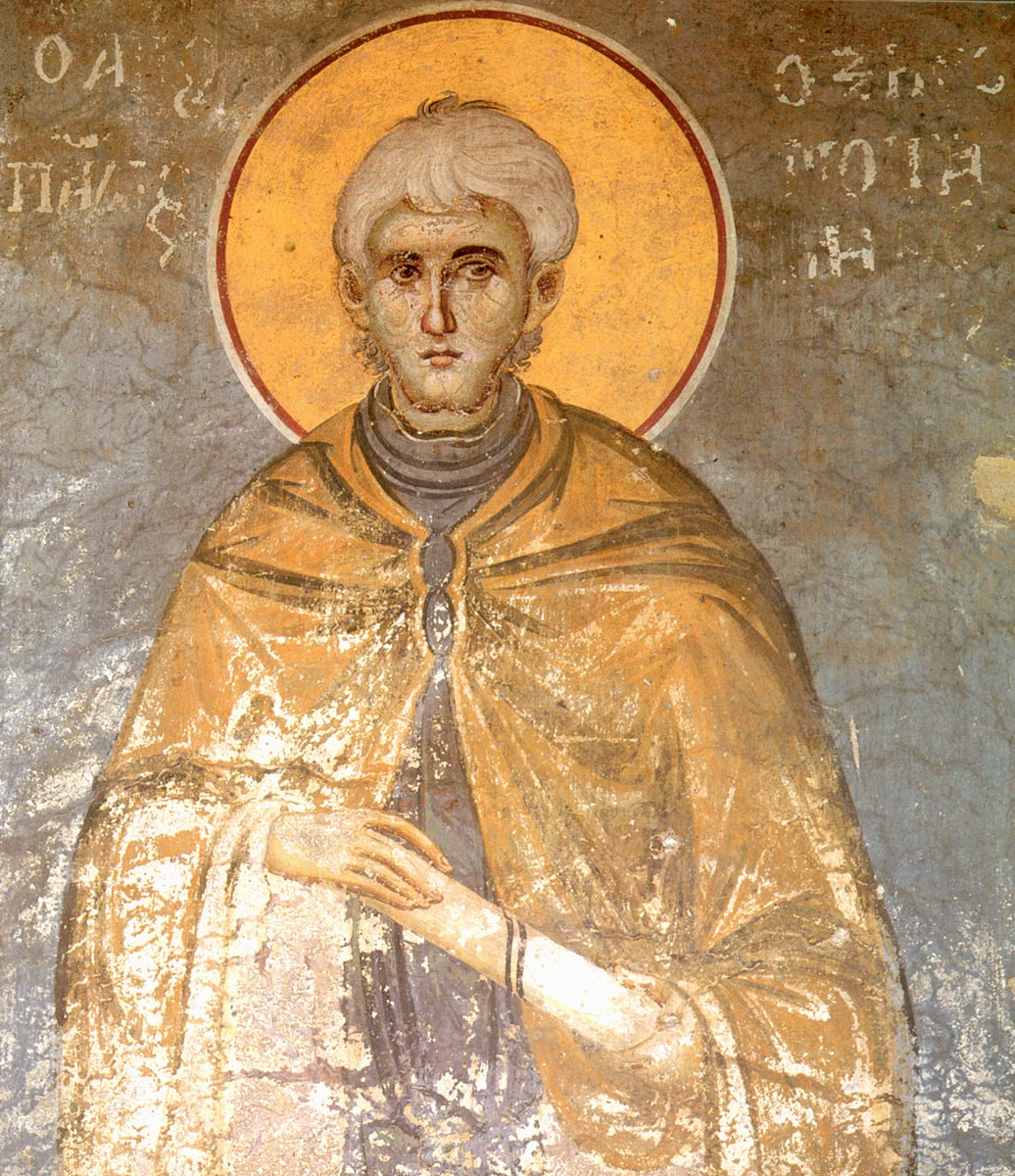
Venerable Paul of Xeropotamou, on Mount Athos.

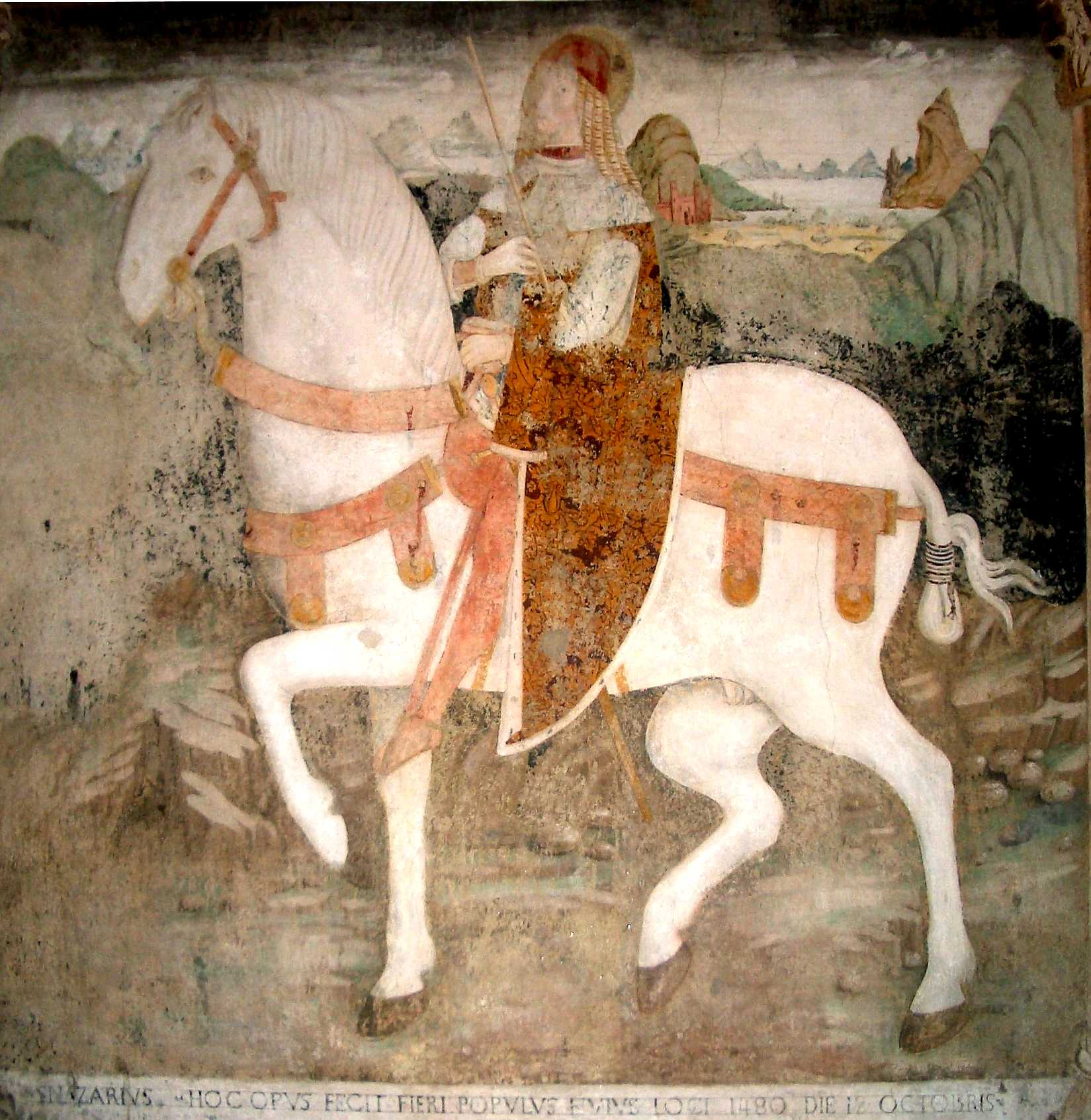
Martyr Nazarius.

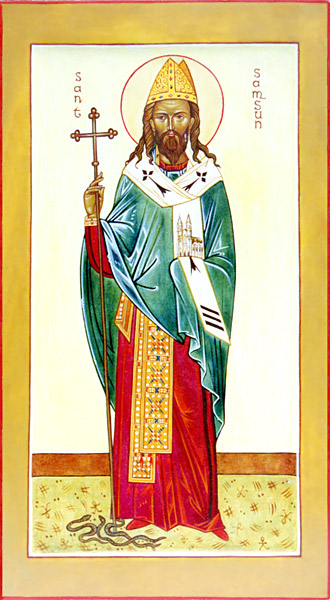
St. Samson of Dol, Bishop of Dol, in Brittany.

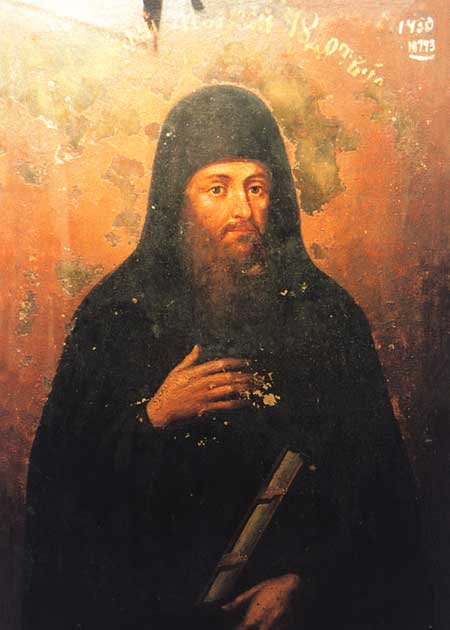
Venerable Moses the Wonderworker of the Kiev Caves.

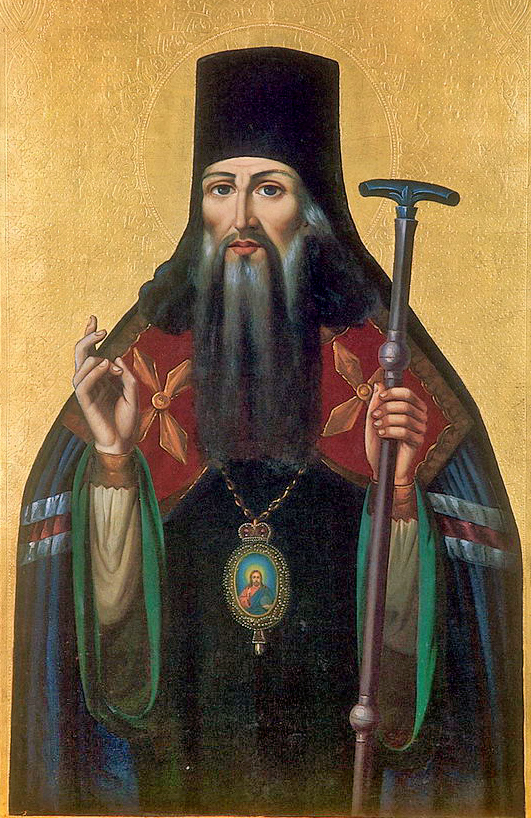
Saint Pitirim, Bishop of Tambov.

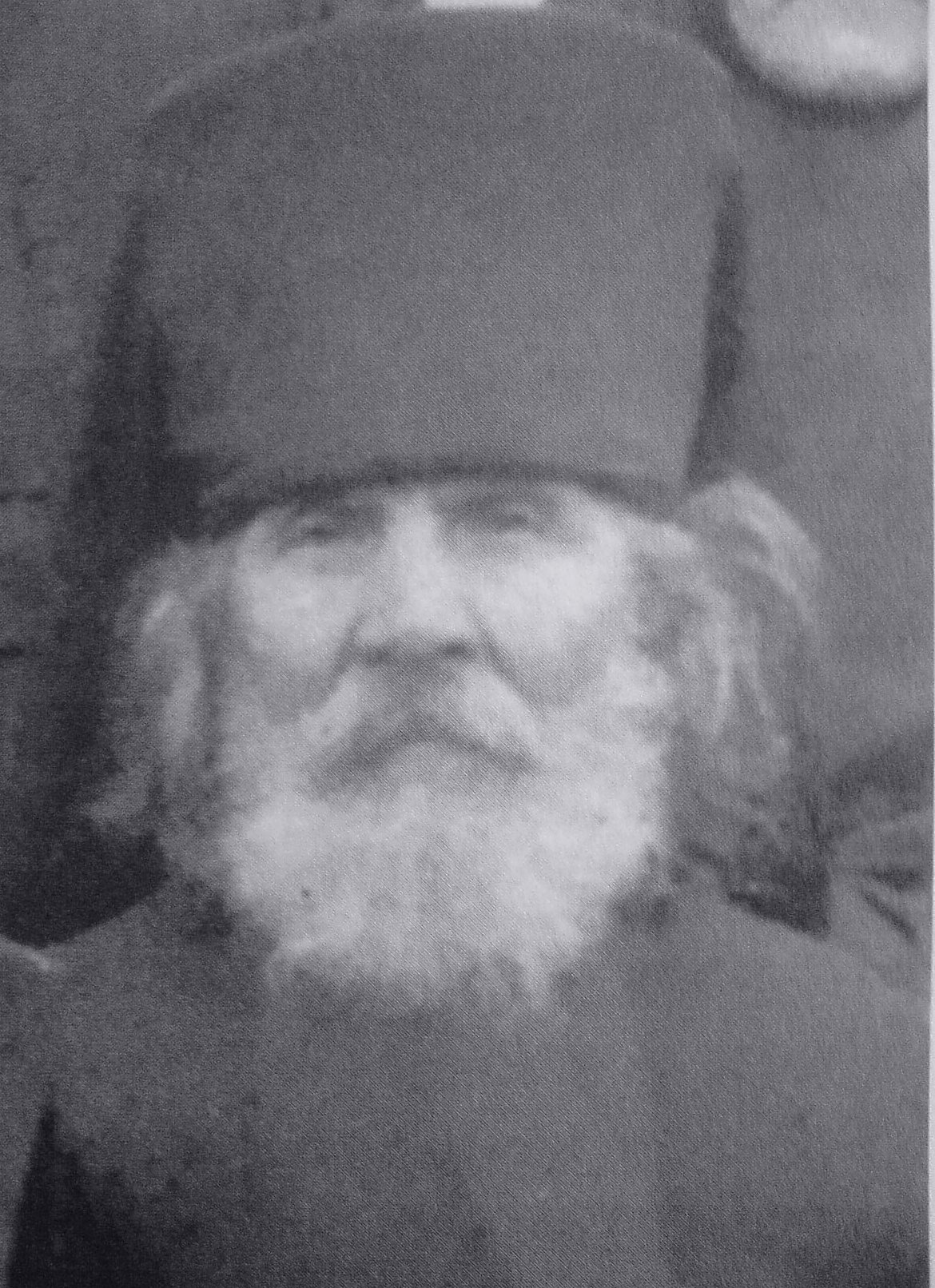
New Hieromartyr Ignatius (Bazyluk).

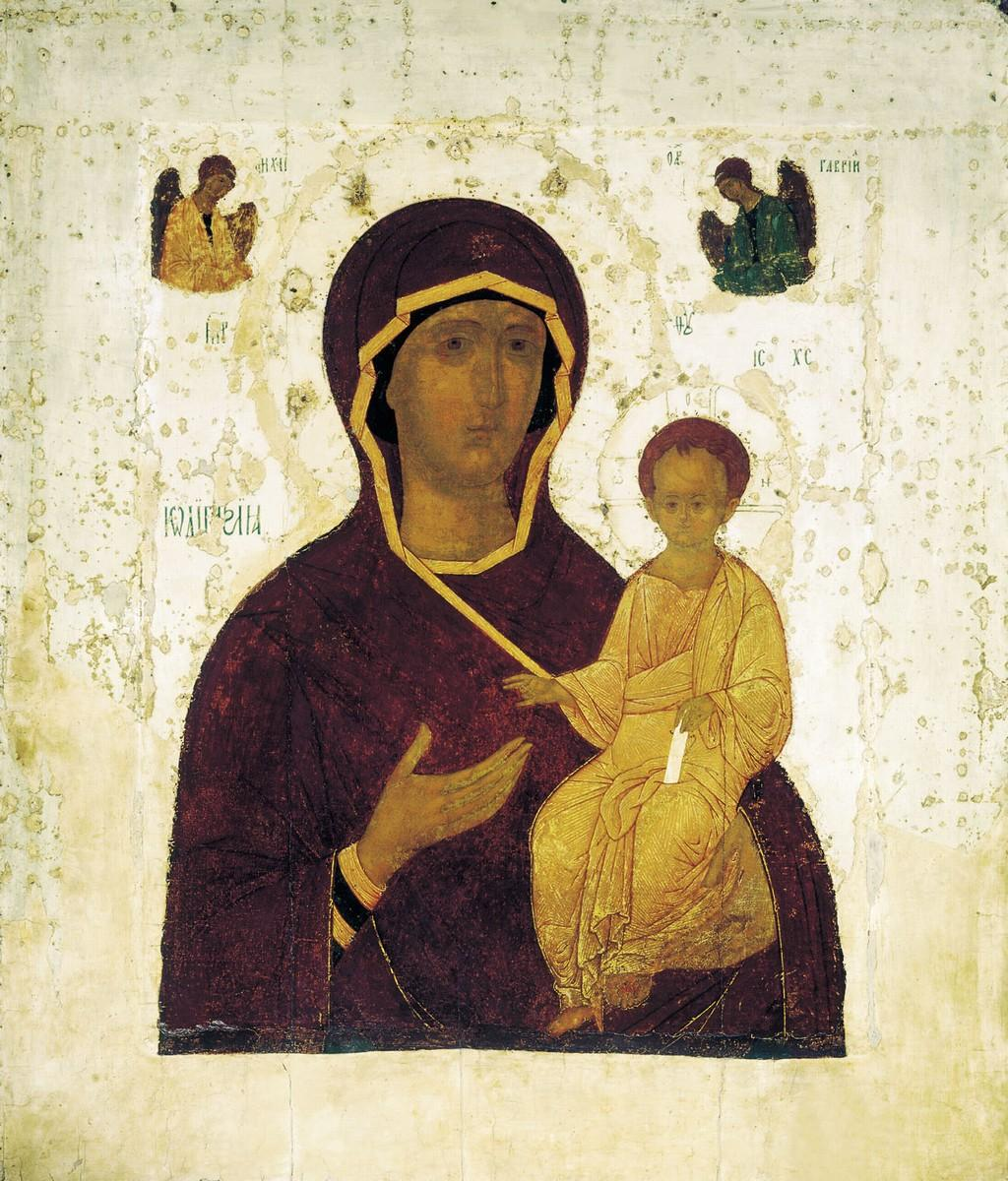
Smolensk Icon of the Mother of God (Dionisius the Wise, 1482).

== Sources ==
- July 28/August 10. Orthodox Calendar (PRAVOSLAVIE.RU).
- August 10 / July 28. HOLY TRINITY RUSSIAN ORTHODOX CHURCH (A parish of the Patriarchate of Moscow).
- July 28. OCA - The Lives of the Saints.
- July 28. The Year of Our Salvation - Holy Transfiguration Monastery, Brookline, Massachusetts.
- The Autonomous Orthodox Metropolia of Western Europe and the Americas (ROCOR). St. Hilarion Calendar of Saints for the year of our Lord 2004. St. Hilarion Press (Austin, TX). p. 55.
- The Twenty-Eighth Day of the Month of July. Orthodoxy in China.
- July 28. Latin Saints of the Orthodox Patriarchate of Rome.
- The Roman Martyrology. Transl. by the Archbishop of Baltimore. Last Edition, According to the Copy Printed at Rome in 1914. Revised Edition, with the Imprimatur of His Eminence Cardinal Gibbons. Baltimore: John Murphy Company, 1916. pp. 223–224.
- Rev. Richard Stanton. A Menology of England and Wales, or, Brief Memorials of the Ancient British and English Saints Arranged According to the Calendar, Together with the Martyrs of the 16th and 17th Centuries. London: Burns & Oates, 1892. pp. 364–367.

Greek Sources

- Great Synaxaristes: (in Greek) 28 ΙΟΥΛΙΟΥ. ΜΕΓΑΣ ΣΥΝΑΞΑΡΙΣΤΗΣ.
- (in Greek) Συναξαριστής. 28 Ιουλίου. ECCLESIA.GR. (H ΕΚΚΛΗΣΙΑ ΤΗΣ ΕΛΛΑΔΟΣ).
- (in Greek) 28/07/2026. Ορθόδοξος Συναξαριστής.

Russian Sources

- (in Russian) 10 августа (28 июля). Православная Энциклопедия под редакцией Патриарха Московского и всея Руси Кирилла (электронная версия). (Orthodox Encyclopedia - Pravenc.ru).
- (in Russian) 28 июля по старому стилю / 10 августа по новому стилю. СПЖ "Союз православных журналистов". 2026.
