= Nicanor the Deacon =

Early Christian saint and one of the Seven Deacons

Saint Nicanor
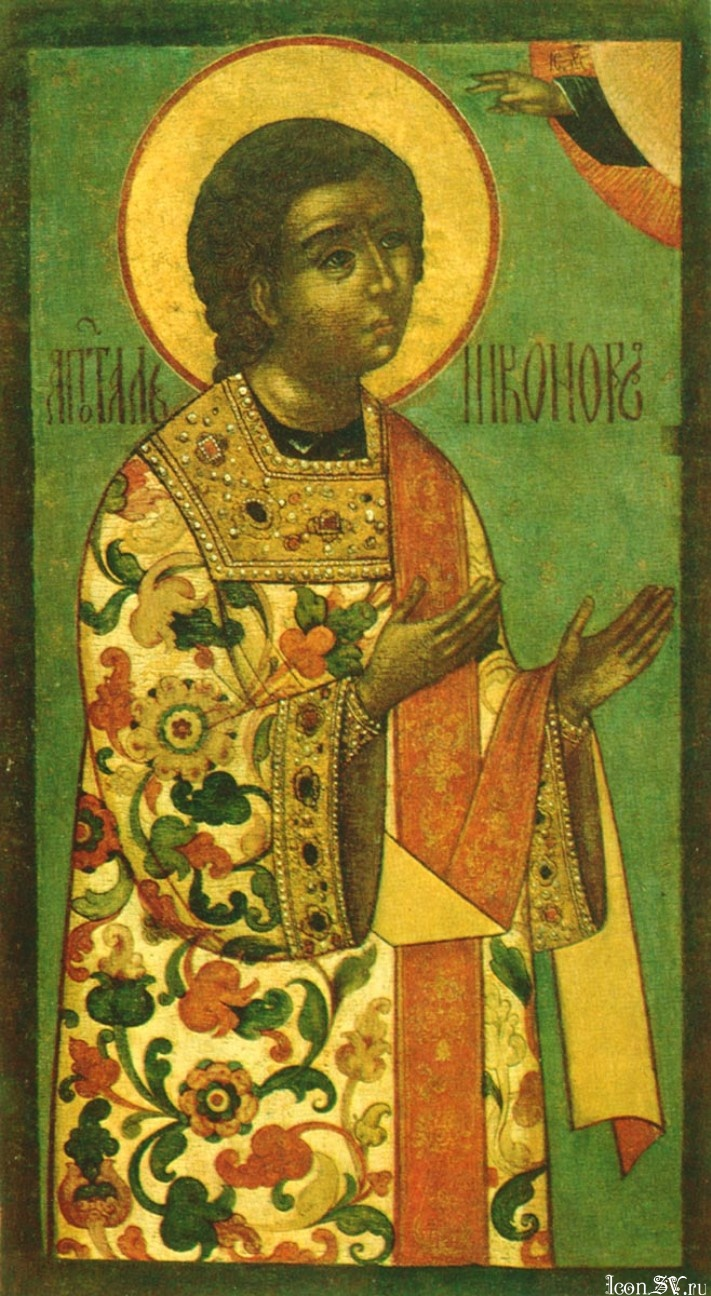
- Icon of Nicanor the Deacon by Fedor Zubov (1685), Smolensky Cathedral, Novodevichy Convent

Apostle, Deacon, Martyr Disciple of the Seventy One of the Seven Deacons
- Died: c. 76; Cyprus, Roman Empire
- Venerated in: Catholic Church; Eastern Orthodox Church
- Feast: 28 July (with the other deacons); 28 December (individual commemoration)
- Attributes: Deacon's vestments (sticharion and orarion); censer

Nicanor (/naɪˈkeɪnər/; Greek: Νικάνωρ, romanized: Nikánōr) was one of the Seven Deacons of the early Christian church, named in the Acts of the Apostles. He is venerated as an apostle of the Seventy, deacon, and martyr in both the Eastern Orthodox Church and the Catholic Church.

== Biblical account ==
Nicanor is named in Acts 6:1–6 as one of seven men chosen by the Jerusalem community of disciples and appointed by the Twelve Apostles to oversee the distribution of food. The passage describes a dispute between Hellenistic Jewish Christians and Hebraic Jewish Christians, in which the widows of the former group were said to be overlooked in the daily distribution. In response, the Twelve proposed selecting seven men "full of the Spirit and wisdom" to administer this service, so that the apostles could devote themselves to prayer and preaching.

The seven chosen were Stephen, Philip, Prochorus, Nicanor, Timon, Parmenas, and Nicholas. The apostles prayed over them and laid hands on them, a rite understood in Christian tradition as the institution of the diaconate.

== Interpretations ==
=== Identity as Hellenistic Jews ===
The Greek names of several of the Seven — including Nicanor, Prochorus, Timon, Parmenas, and Nicholas — have led many scholars to conclude that most or all of them were Hellenistic Jews, appointed in part to address the grievances of the Hellenistic community. The name Nicanor (meaning "conqueror of men" in Greek) was common in the Hellenistic world, shared by several figures in ancient Judea including a Seleucid military commander and the namesake of the Nicanor Gate of the Jerusalem Temple.

=== Whether the Seven were deacons ===
The Seven are traditionally regarded as the first deacons of the Christian church, but some scholars have noted that the Greek word διάκονος (diakonos) does not appear in Acts 6 itself. Debate has continued about the precise nature of their office. One scholarly position regards the deacons primarily as "lowly, benevolent servants" performing menial tasks — distributing food, caring for widows and the poor — without particular authority in the congregation. Another view holds that deacons were authoritative servants with responsibility over the material and sometimes even spiritual affairs of the church. Merkle himself argues for a middle position: that deacons held an official and authoritative yet subordinate role within the Pauline churches.

=== The persecution context ===
Eckhard Schnabel situates the appointment of the Seven within a sequence of escalating persecutions of the Jerusalem church. He identifies the episode of Acts 6 as the third major persecution in Jerusalem, in which Greek-speaking Jews accused Stephen of speaking against the Temple and the Law, leading to his execution before the Sanhedrin. The persecution that followed Stephen's death scattered many Jerusalem believers into Judea, Samaria, and further afield, with some traveling to Cyprus — the island where Nicanor himself is traditionally said to have died.

== Death and veneration ==
According to the Pseudo-Hippolytus text On the Seventy Disciples, Nicanor died at the time of the martyrdom of Stephen. Orthodox tradition holds that he suffered alongside Stephen and a large number of other Christians killed in the persecution that followed. His death is conventionally dated to around 76 AD, though this varies across sources.

Nicanor is counted among the Apostles of the Seventy in Eastern Orthodox tradition. He is commemorated individually on 28 December in the Eastern Orthodox calendar, and collectively with Prochorus, Timon, Parmenas, and Nicholas on 28 July. Stephen, the seventh of the original Seven, is commemorated separately as the Protomartyr on 26 December. In the Catholic Church, Nicanor is commemorated in the Roman Martyrology on 10 January.

== Legacy ==
Nicanor appears in several early Christian lists of the Seventy disciples. The Pseudo-Dorotheus list, a text attributed to Dorotheus of Tyre, includes him among the Seventy.

An icon of Nicanor the Deacon painted by Fyodor Zubov in 1685 is preserved in the Smolensky Cathedral of the Novodevichy Convent in Moscow.
