= Timon (deacon) =

1st-century Christian deacon and martyr

Saint Timon
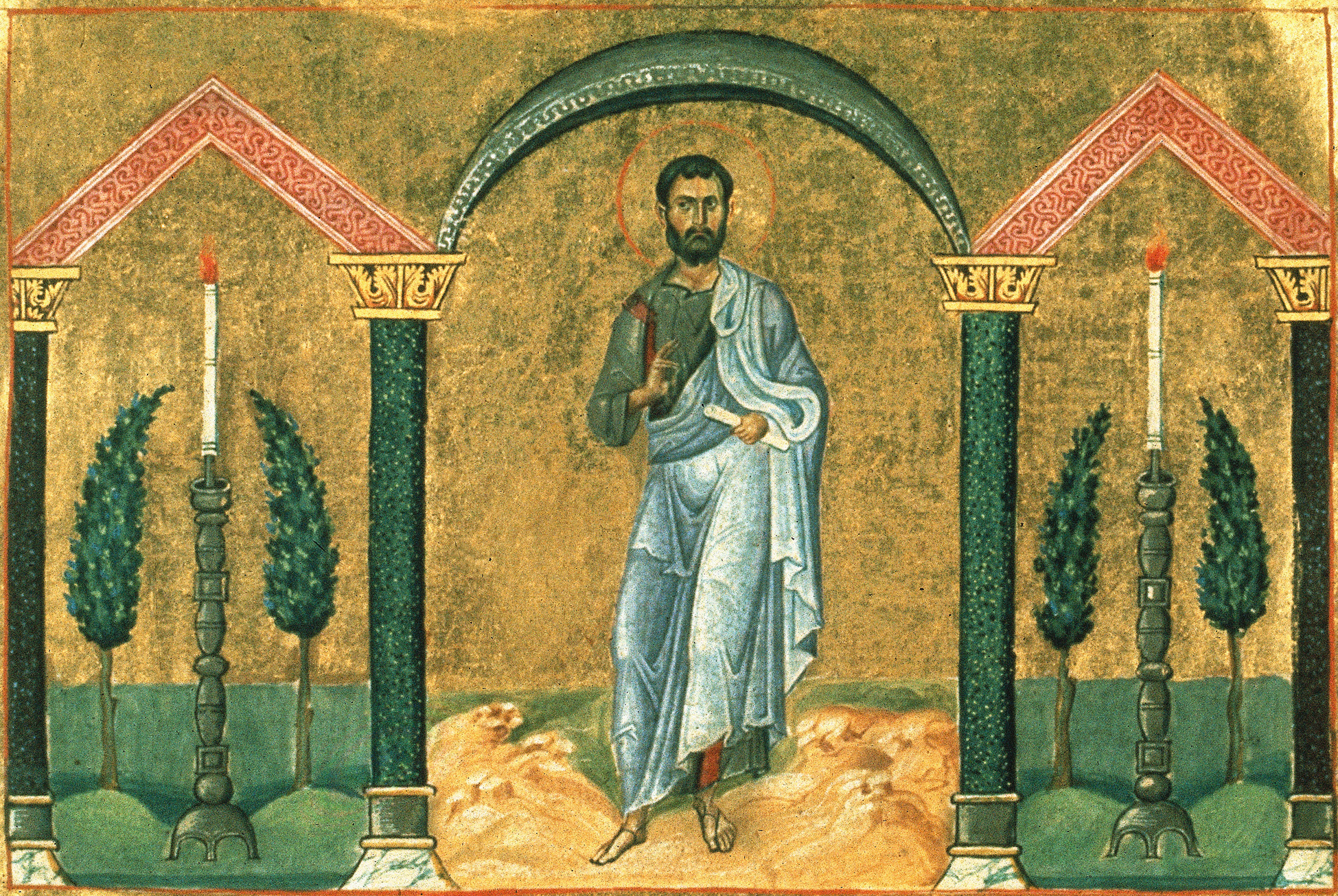

Martyr
- Died: c. AD 44
- Venerated in: Eastern Orthodox Church; Roman Catholic Church; Coptic Orthodox Church
- Feast: 19 April (Western); 30 December (Eastern)

Timon (Greek: Τίμων) was one of the Seven Deacons appointed to serve the early Christian church and a martyr.

== Biography ==
Timon (Greek: Τίμων) was a common Greek name and means someone honorable. Based on his name, it has been guessed that he was a Hellenistic Jew. The lone reference of him in the Bible comes in chapter six of the Acts of the Apostles. Acts records that in the early days of the Christian church, the Hellenistic Jews complained that they were being overlooked in food distribution, and the apostles appointed seven men "of good reputation, full of the Holy Spirit and wisdom", to address the issue. These seven were known as the Seven Deacons, and their role was the "forerunner of the office of deacon in modern churches". Timon was the fourth named of these seven deacons, alongside Stephen, Philip, Prochorus, Nicanor, Parmenas and Nicholas.

Although no further mention of Timon is made in Acts, there are several traditions about his later life. According to one tradition, he was one of the seventy disciples sent out by Jesus in the Gospel of Luke. Eastern Christian tradition states that he became the bishop of Bostra in Syria, appointed by the apostles. He is said to have "suffered greatly" at the hands of Jews and pagans due to his preaching of Christ, leading to him being thrown into a fire by a local governor angry with his preaching. Roman Catholic tradition states that Timon preached in Haleb and Beroea and that he survived being cast into a fire in Corinth, but was later crucified. Some sources state that he served as bishop of Corinth until his martyrdom. One source dates his death to AD 44 and other traditions consider his place of death to have been Philippi, Greece.

Timon is venerated as a saint by the Catholic Church, Eastern Orthodox Church, and the Coptic Orthodox Church. His feast day is celebrated on 19 April in the west and 30 December in the east, while he is also commemorated on 28 July in the east.
