= Apelles of Heraklion =

1st century Christian bishop and saint

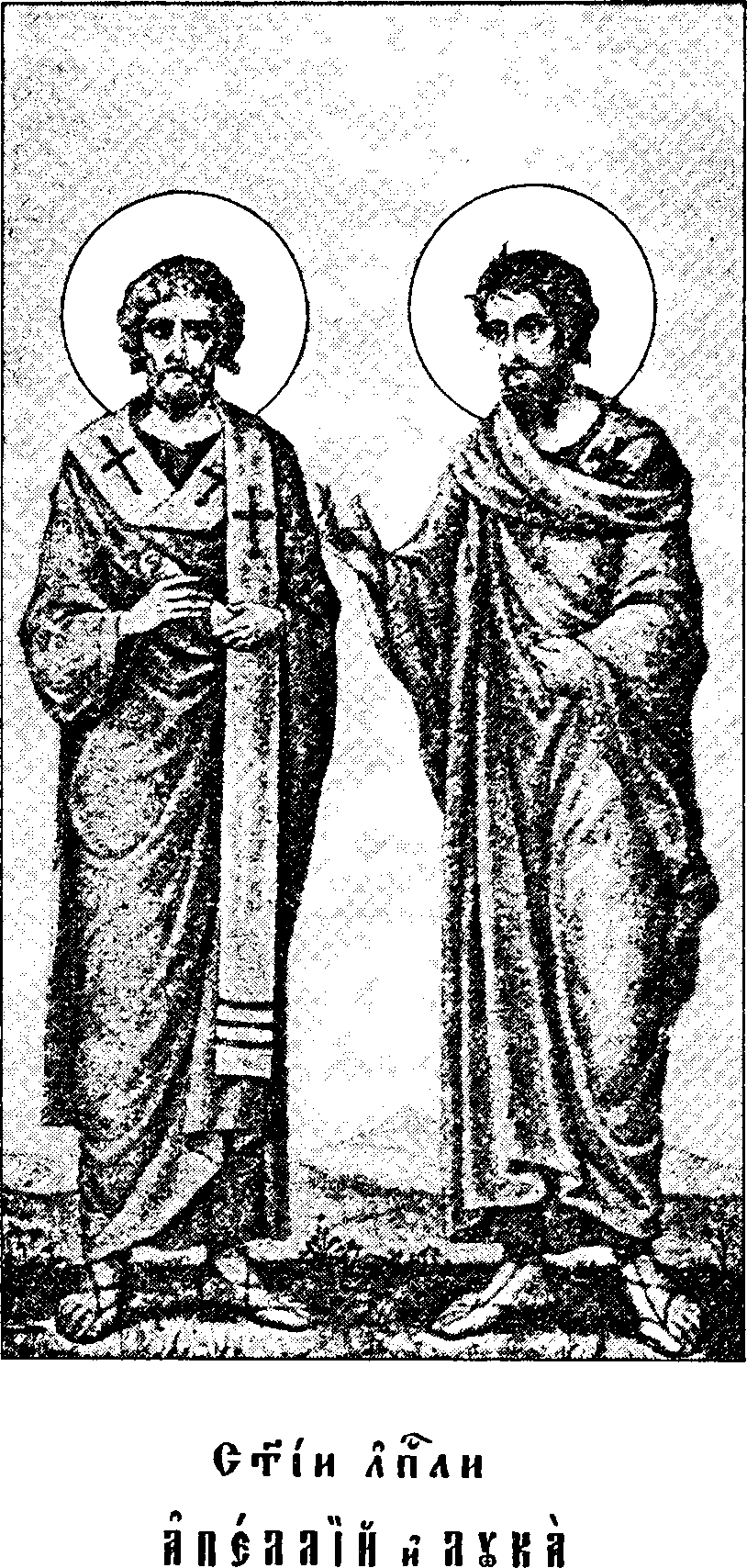

Apelles of Heraklion (Ancient Greek: Ἀπελλῆς) is numbered among the Seventy Disciples. Along with the Apostles Urban of Macedonia, Stachys, Ampliatus, Narcissus of Athens and Aristobulus of Britannia (all of these names are mentioned together by St. Paul in Romans 16:8–11, which cannot be casual) he assisted Saint Andrew. St. Apelles was bishop of Heraclea in Trachis. His feast day is October 31.

Although specific writings from Apelles of Heraklion have not survived, early Christian traditions suggest that his teachings emphasized themes of unity, forgiveness, and inclusivity. As one of the Seventy Disciples mentioned by the Apostle Paul in Romans Romans 16:10, Apelles likely contributed to the early Christian message through his emphasis on communal bonds within the faith. Historical accounts indicate that Apelles welcomed diverse groups, including marginalized members of society, reinforcing the Christian ideal of universal acceptance. His approach also encouraged believers to practice forgiveness, reflecting Jesus’ teachings on mercy and compassion. Apelles' influence can still be observed in early Christian writings and hymns that celebrate forgiveness and fellowship among believers.

== Sources ==
- St. Nikolai Velimirovic, The Prologue from Ohrid
- Lightfoot, J.B. (1891). The Apostolic Fathers. Macmillan.
- Hippolytus of Rome. On the Seventy Apostles. c. 3rd century.
- Bauckham, Richard (2006). Jesus and the Eyewitnesses: The Gospels as Eyewitness Testimony. Eerdmans.
