= Urban of Macedonia =

One of the seventy apostles mentioned by St. Paul

Saint Urban of Macedonia
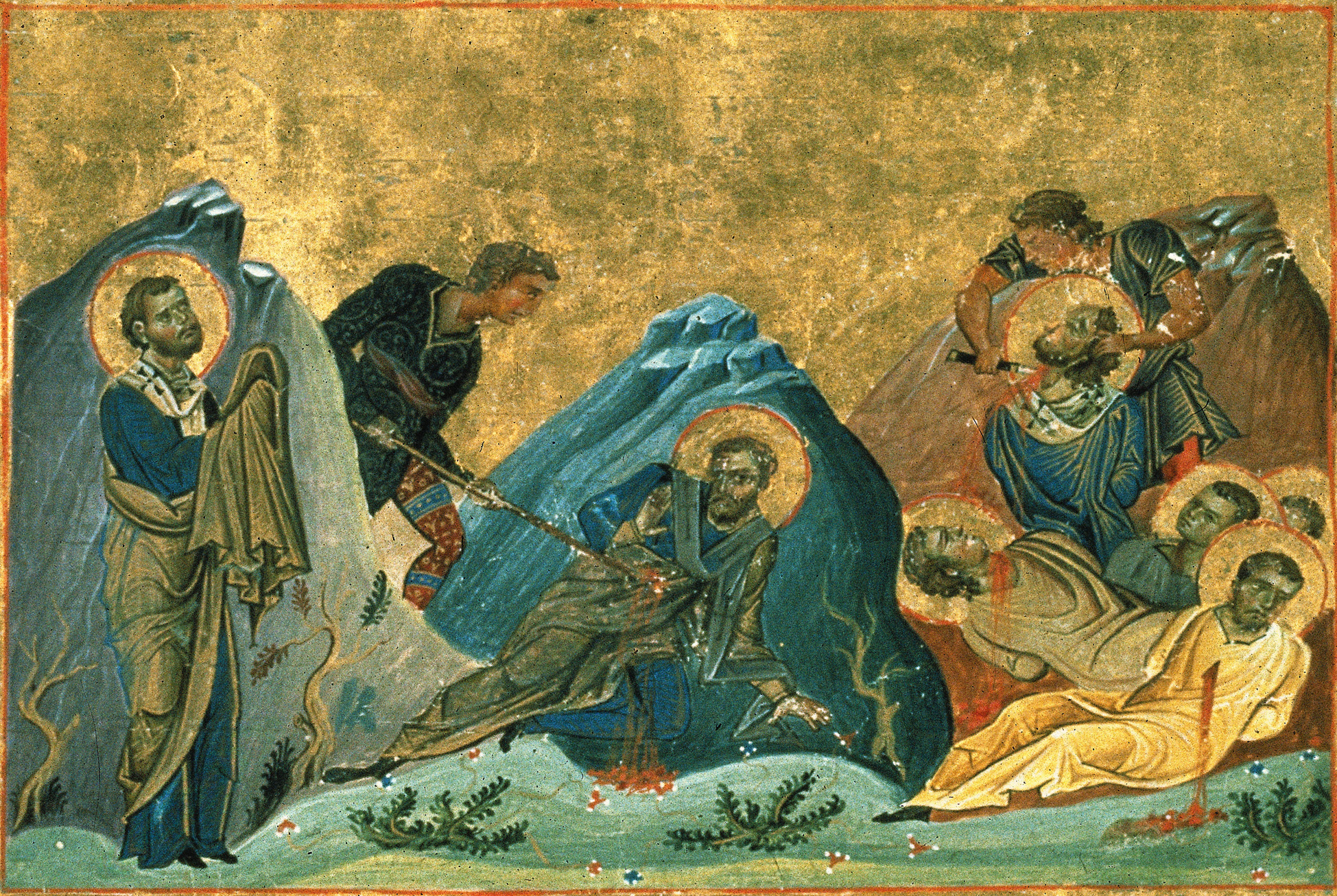
- Stachys, Amplias, Urban (by Menologion of Basil II)

Apostle of Macedonia
- Born: c. 1st century AD; Macedonia, Roman Empire
- Died: c. 1st century AD; Macedonia, Roman Empire
- Venerated in: Catholic Church; Eastern Orthodox Church
- Feast: 31 October (Byzantine Christianity); 13 July (Roman Catholic); 4 January with the 70 Apostles (Byzantine Christianity)

Urban of Macedonia (Greek: Ουρβανός) is numbered among the Seventy Apostles. Along with the Apostles Ampliatus, Stachys, Narcissus of Athens, Apelles of Heraklion and Aristobulus of Britannia (all of these names are mentioned together by St. Paul in Romans 16:8–11, which cannot be casual) he assisted Saint Andrew. St. Andrew ordained Urban bishop in Macedonia. He died a martyr, and his feast day is October 31.

Urban is venerated as saint by Eastern Orthodox Church (January 4, October 31), Roman Catholic Church (July 13) and other Christian Churches.

== Hymns ==
Troparion (Tone 3)

Holy Apostles of the Seventy: Stáchys, Amplías, Úrban, Narcíssus, Apélles, and Aristobúlus,
Eentreat the merciful God
To grant our souls forgiveness of transgressions.

Kontakion (Tone 8)

Let us thankfully praise the wise Apostles
Stáchys, Amplías, Úrban, Narcíssus, Apélles, and Aristobúlus,
Those treasures of the Holy Spirit and rays of the Sun of glory,
Who were gathered together by the grace of our God.

== Sources ==
- St. Nikolai Velimirovic, The Prologue from Ohrid
