= Stachys the Apostle =

Second bishop of Byzantium from 38 to 54 AD

Saint Stachys the Apostle
- Bishop of Byzantium
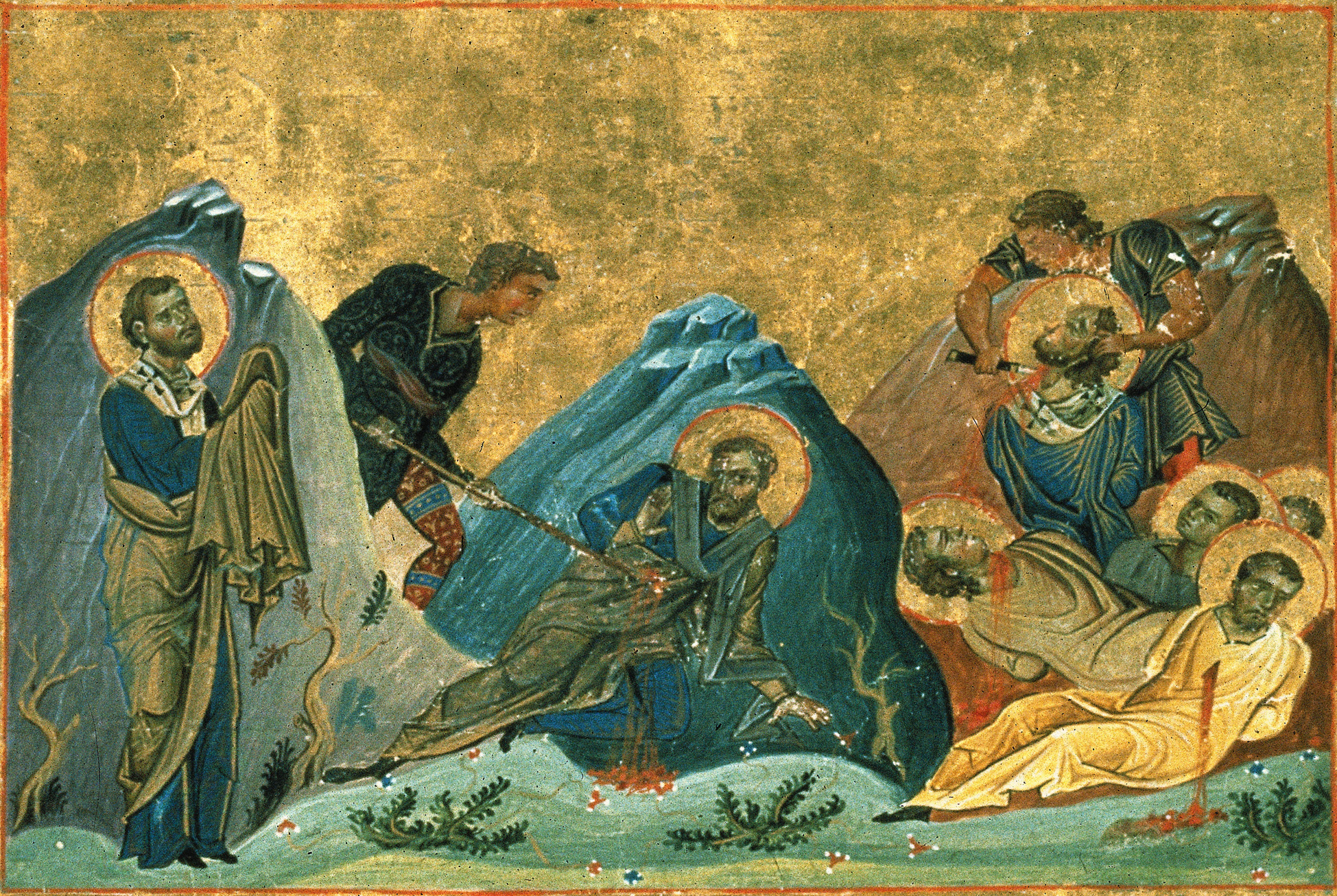
- Stachys, Amplias, Urban (Menologion of Basil II)
- Installed: 38 AD
- Term ended: 54 AD
- Predecessor: Andrew the Apostle
- Successor: Onesimus

Orders
- Ordination: by Andrew the Apostle

Personal details
- Died: 54 AD Byzantium, Bithynia and Pontus, Roman Empire
- Denomination: Early Christianity

Sainthood
- Feast day: 31 October
- Venerated in: Eastern Orthodox Church, Catholic Church
- Title as Saint: Apostle of the Seventy, Bishop of Byzantium

Stachys the Apostle (Greek: Στάχυς, "ear-spike"; died 54) was the second bishop of Byzantium, from 38 to 54 AD according to tradition.

Stachys is mentioned just one time in the New Testament as a person loved by Paul the Apostle (Romans 16:9). Other than that, all information regarding him comes from tradition. He seemed to be closely connected to Andrew the Apostle and Paul the Apostle. Eusebius quotes Origen as saying that Andrew had preached in Asia Minor and in Scythia, along the Black Sea as far as Kyiv and the Volga, hence he became a patron saint of Ukraine, Romania and Russia. According to tradition, Saint Andrew founded the See of Byzantium in 38, installing Stachys as bishop, a position he held for sixteen years.

This See would later develop into the Patriarchate of Constantinople, having Apostle Andrew as its Patron Saint. Stachys founded a church at Argyropouli, and many people gathered there to hear him preach.

It is not clear if Stachys was the same person whom Paul calls "dear" in the Epistle to the Romans (Rom. 16:9). He is always associated in traditions with five other apostles (Ampliatus, Urban of Macedonia, Apelles of Heraklion, Aristobulus of Britannia and Narcissus of Athens) that are the very same names mentioned together with him by Paul in Romans 16:8–11.

His feast day is on 31 October.

== Notes and references ==
Titles of the Great Christian Church
Preceded by Andrew the Apostle	Bishop of Byzantium; 38–54	Succeeded by Onesimus
