= Artemas (saint) =

Christian saint

Saint Artemas of Lystra
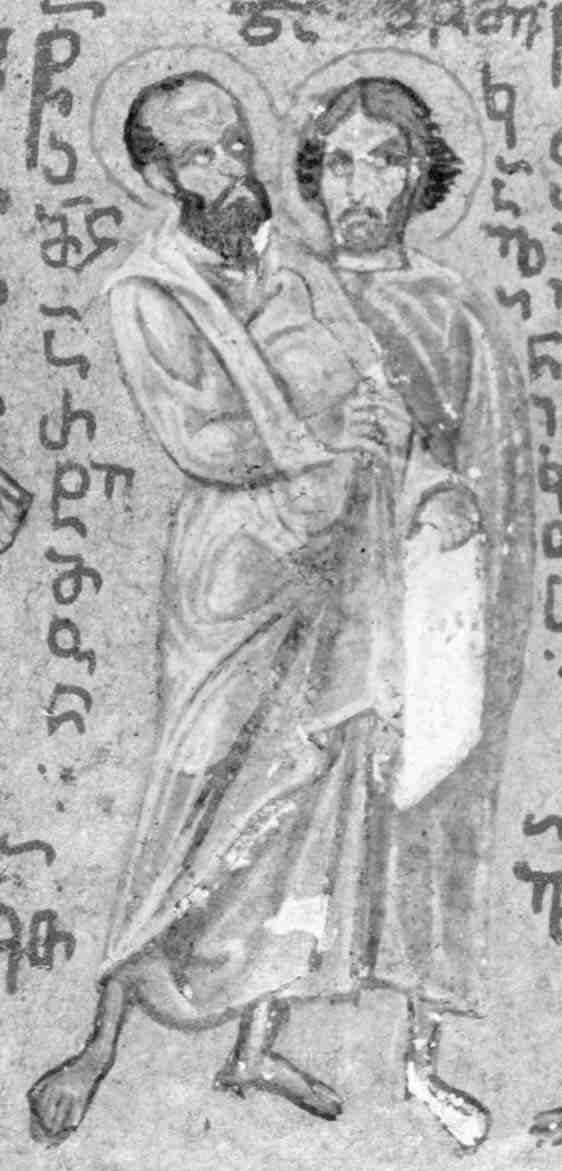

Apostle of the Seventy, Bishop of Lystra
- Born: AD 1st century
- Residence: Lystra
- Died: c. 1st century
- Venerated in: Eastern Orthodox Church; Roman Catholic Church
- Feast: 30 October

Artemas of Lystra (Greek: Ἀρτεμᾶς) was an early Christian saint, who is mentioned in the New Testament. He is mentioned in Paul's Epistle to Titus (Titus 3:12). He is believed to have served as the Bishop of Lystra, and to have been one of the Seventy Disciples. He is a saint in the Eastern Orthodox Church and Roman Catholic Church.

== Biography ==
Very little is known about Artemas. He was presumably born sometime in the early 1st century, and then commissioned by Jesus in Luke 10:1–4 with the rest of the Seventy Disciples to spread the Gospel. According to Holy Tradition, he was the Bishop of Lystra for some time and "died in peace", meaning he did not die a martyr's death.

== Veneration ==
He is venerated as a saint in the Eastern Orthodox Church and Roman Catholic Church, with a feast day on 30 October.
