= Narcissus of Athens =

1st century Roman Christian saint and bishop

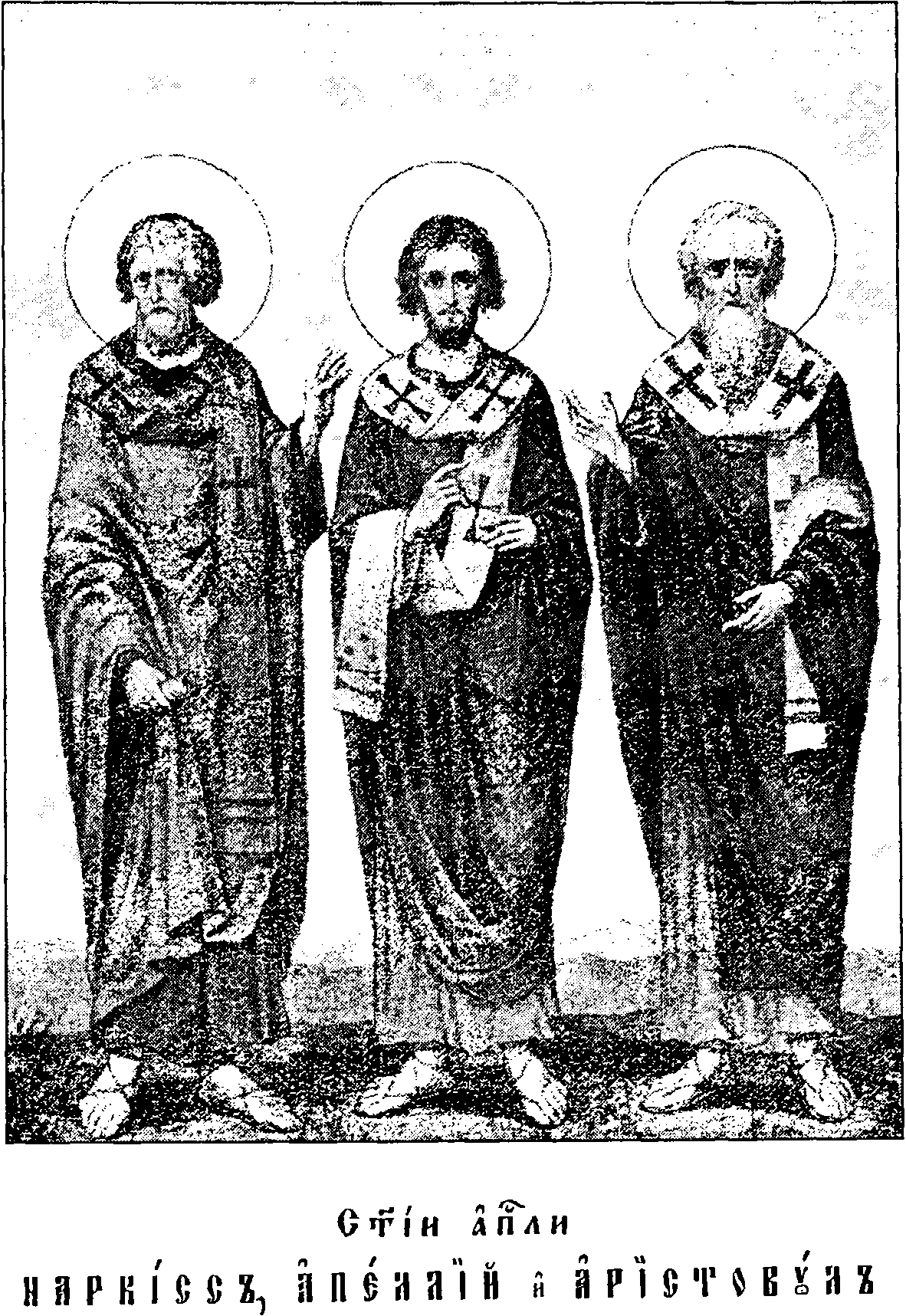

Narcissus of Athens (Greek: Νάρκισσος ό Άθηναίος) is numbered among the Seventy Disciples. Along with the Apostles Urban of Macedonia, Stachys, Ampliatus, Apelles of Heraklion and Aristobulus of Britannia (all of these names are mentioned together by St. Paul in Romans 16:8–11, which cannot be casual) he assisted Saint Andrew. The Apostle Philip ordained St. Narcissus bishop of Athens. His feast day is October 31.

== Sources ==
- St. Nikolai Velimirovic, The Prologue from Ohrid

Catholic Church titles
Preceded by Dionysius the Areopagite	Bishop of Athens	Succeeded by Publius of Athens
