= Seventy disciples =

Early students of Jesus mentioned in the Gospel of Luke

Saints Seventy disciples
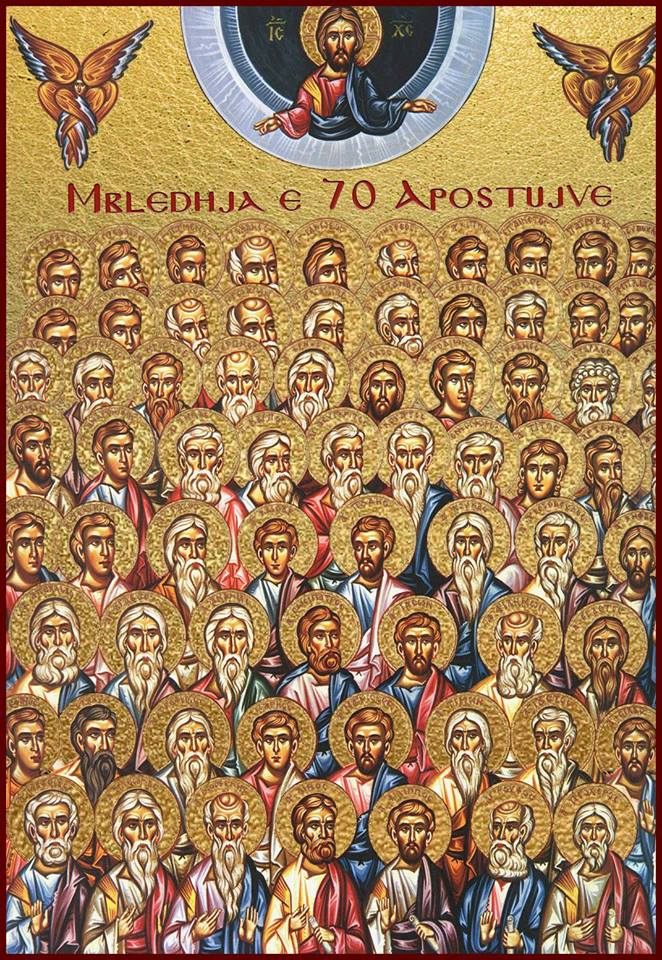
- Icon of the Seventy Apostles

Disciples
- Venerated in: Catholic Church; Eastern Orthodoxy; Oriental Orthodoxy; Lutheran Church; Anglican Church
- Canonized: Pre-Congregation
- Feast: 4 January (Eastern Orthodoxy)
- Attributes: Scroll; Cross

The seventy disciples (Greek: ἑβδομήκοντα μαθητές, hebdomikonta mathetes), known in the Eastern Christian traditions as the seventy apostles (Greek: ἑβδομήκοντα απόστολοι, hebdomikonta apostoloi), were early emissaries of Jesus mentioned in the Gospel of Luke. The number of those disciples varies between either 70 or 72 depending on the manuscript.

The passage from Luke 10 in the Gospel of Luke, the only gospel in which they are mentioned, includes specific instructions for the mission, beginning with (in Douay–Rheims Bible):

And after these things the Lord appointed also other seventy-two: and he sent them two and two before his face into every city and place whither he himself was to come.

In Western Christianity, they are usually referred to as disciples, whereas in Eastern Christianity they are usually referred to as apostles. Using the original Greek words, both titles are descriptive, as an apostle is one sent on a mission (the Greek uses the verb form ἀποστέλλειν – ’apostéllein), whereas a disciple is a student, but the two traditions differ on the scope of the words apostle and disciple.

== Analysis ==
This is the only mention of the group in the Bible. The number is seventy in some manuscripts of the Alexandrian (such as Codex Sinaiticus) and Caesarean text traditions but seventy-two in most other Alexandrian and Western texts. Samuel Dickey Gordon notes that they were sent out as thirty-five deputations of two each.

The number may derive from the seventy nations of Genesis 10 or the many other occurrences of the number seventy in the Bible, or the seventy-two translators of the Septuagint from the Letter of Aristeas. In translating the Vulgate, Jerome selected the reading of seventy-two.

The Gospel of Luke is not alone among the synoptic gospels in containing multiple episodes in which Jesus sends out his followers on missions. The first occasion (Luke 9:1–6) is closely based on the "limited commission" mission in Mark 6:6–13, which, however, recounts the sending out of the twelve apostles, rather than seventy, though with similar details. The report of the second commission is likely a Lukan construct. The text has parallels with the Gospel of Thomas, which is likely dependent on Lukan redaction in 14.4. Luke also mentions the Great Commission to "all nations" (Luke 24:44–49) but in less detail than Matthew's account, and Mark 16:19–20 mentions the Dispersion of the Apostles.

What has been said to the seventy (two) in Luke 10:4 is referred in passing to the Twelve in Luke 22:35:

He said to them, "When I sent you forth without a money bag or a sack or sandals, were you in need of anything?" "No, nothing", they replied.

== Feast days ==
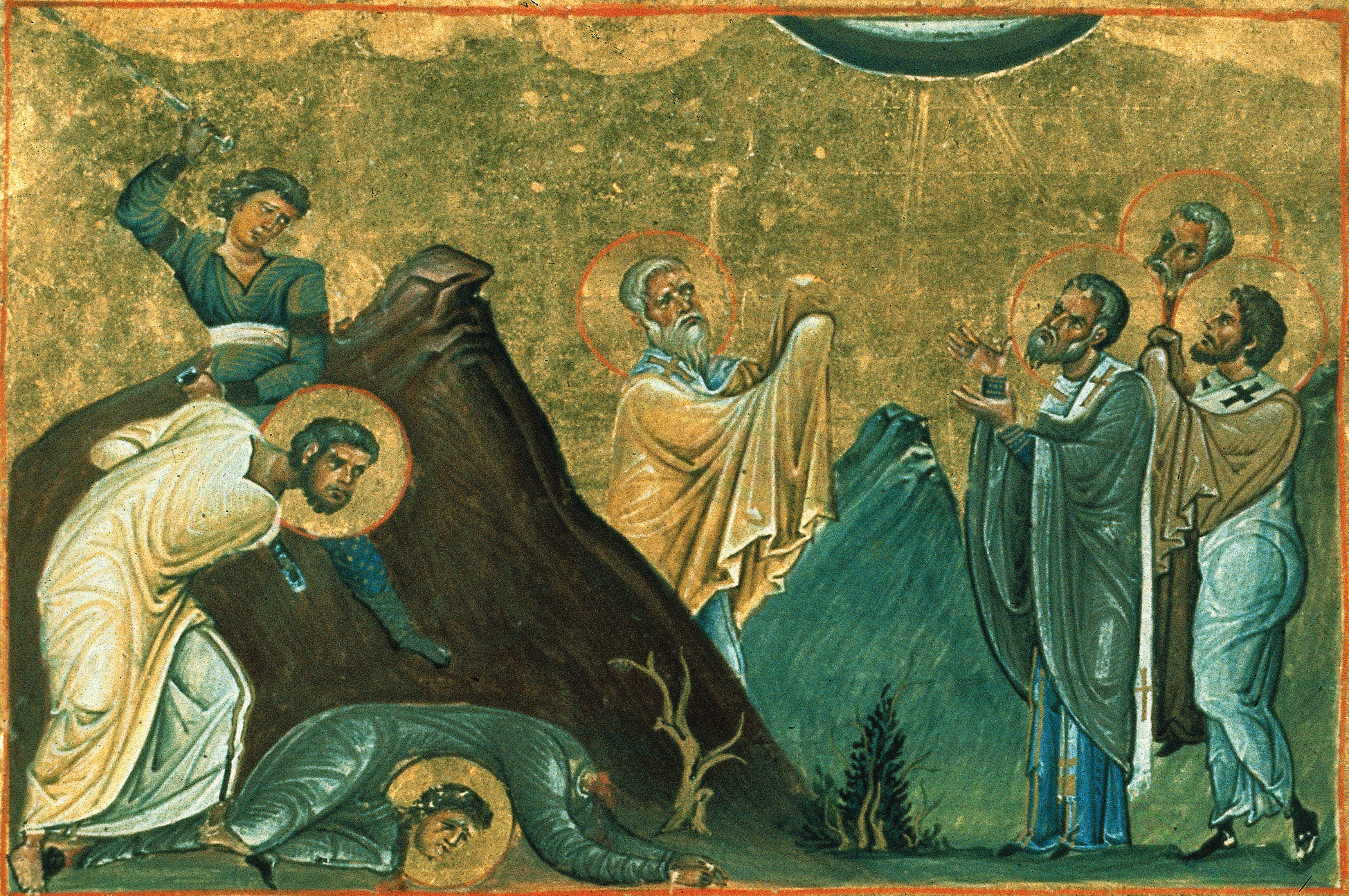
Erastus, Olympus, Rhodion, Sosipater, Quartus and Tertius

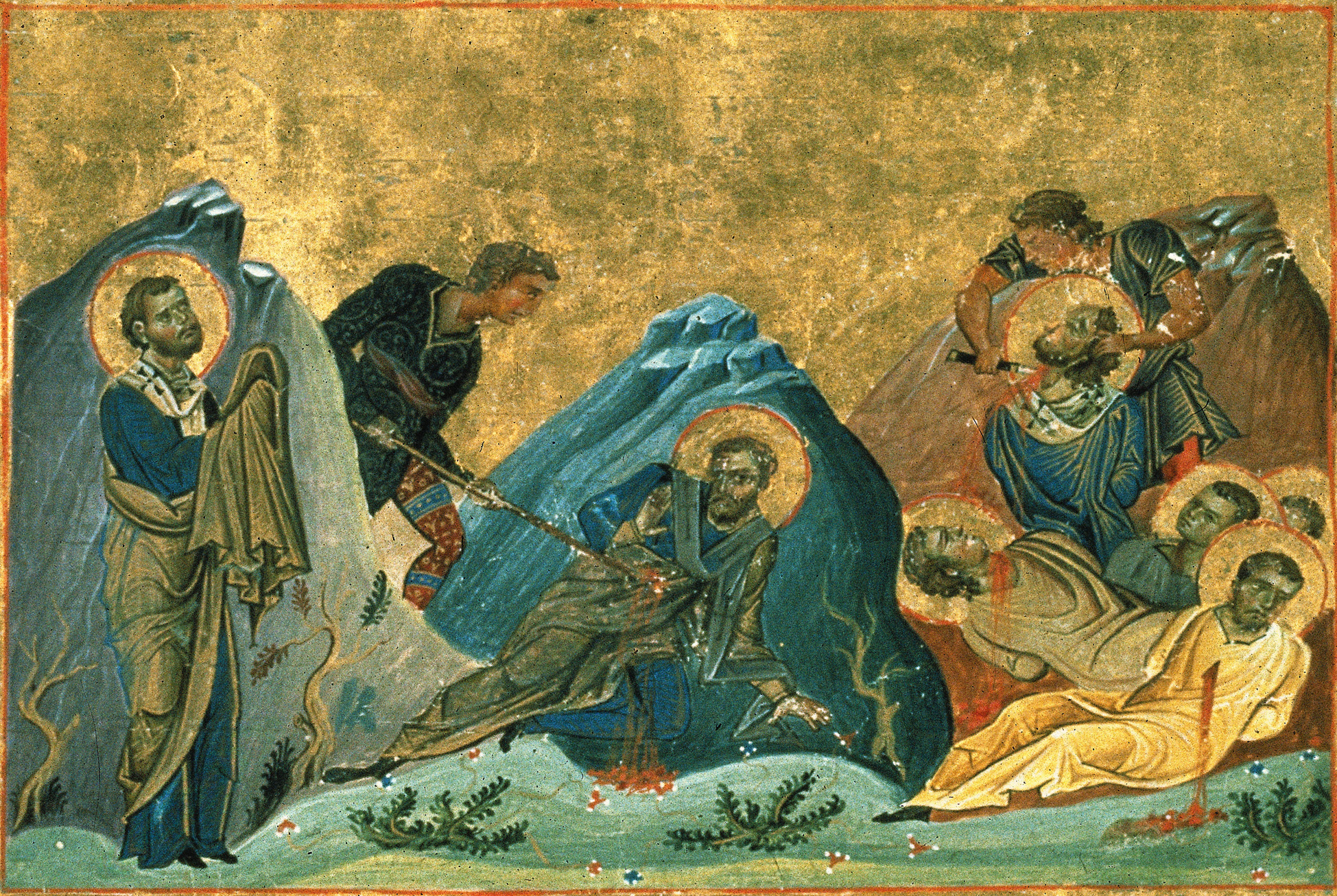
Stachys, Amplias, Urban

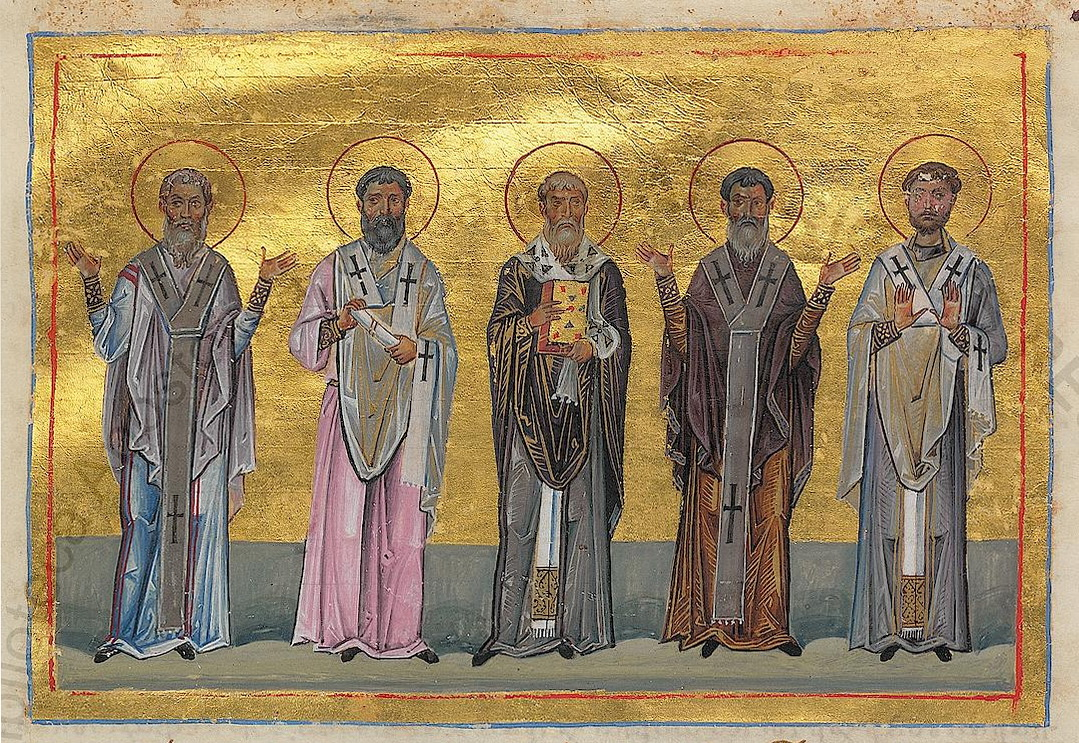
Patrobulus, Hermas, Linus, Caius, Philologus

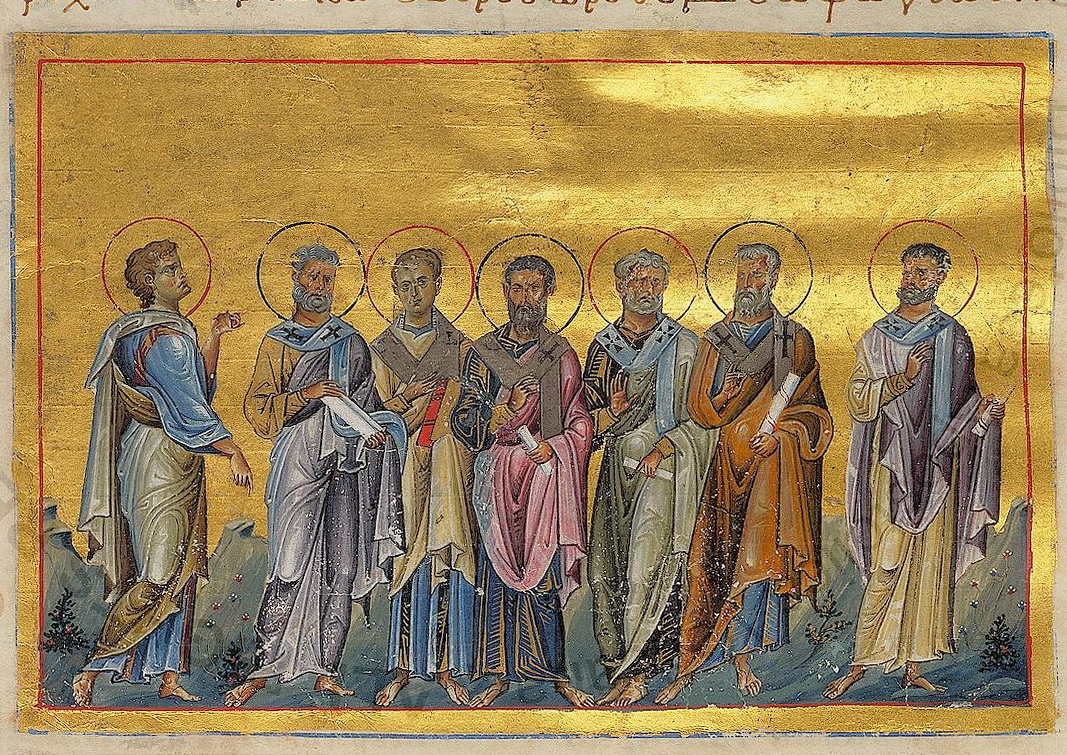
Sosthenes, Apollo, Cephas, Tychicus, Epaphroditus, Cæsar and Onesiphorus

The feast day commemorating the seventy is known as the "Synaxis of the Seventy Disciples" in Eastern Orthodoxy, and is celebrated on January 4. Each of the seventy disciples also has individual commemorations scattered throughout the liturgical year (see Eastern Orthodox Church calendar).

== Lists of the disciples' names ==
=== Attributed to Hippolytus ===
A Greek text titled On the Seventy Apostles of Christ is known from several manuscripts, the oldest in Codex Baroccianus 206, a ninth-century palimpsest lectionary. The text is ancient, but its traditional ascription to Hippolytus of Rome is now considered dubious. An 1886 translation is:

1. James the Lord's brother, bishop of Jerusalem
2. Cleopas
3. Matthias, who supplied the vacant place in the number of the twelve apostles
4. Thaddeus, who conveyed the epistle to Augarus (Abgar V)
5. Ananias, who baptized Paul, and was bishop of Damascus
6. Stephen, the first martyr
7. Philip, who baptized the Ethiopian eunuch
8. Prochorus, bishop of Nicomedia, who also was the first that departed, 11 believing together with his daughters
9. Nicanor died when Stephen was martyred
10. Timon, bishop of Bostra
11. Parmenas, bishop of Soli (either in Cyprus or in Asia Minor) .
12. Nicolaus, bishop of Samaria
13. Barnabas, bishop of Milan
14. Mark the Evangelist, bishop of Alexandria
15. Luke the Evangelist
  These two [Mark and Luke] belonged to the seventy disciples who were scattered by the offence of the word which Christ spoke, "Except a man eat my flesh, and drink my blood, he is not worthy of me." But the one being induced to return to the Lord by Peter's instrumentality, and the other by Paul's, they were honored to preach that Gospel on account of which they also suffered martyrdom, the one being burned, and the other being crucified on an olive tree.
16. Silas, bishop of Corinth
17. Silvanus, bishop of Thessalonica
18. Crisces (Crescens), bishop of Carchedon in Galatia
19. Epænetus, bishop of Carthage
20. Andronicus, bishop of Pannonia
21. Amplias, bishop of Odessus
22. Urban, bishop of Macedonia
23. Stachys, bishop of Byzantium
24. Barnabas, bishop of Heraclea
25. Phygellus, bishop of Ephesus. He was of the party also of Simon
26. Hermogenes. He, too, was of the same mind with the former
27. Demas, who also became a priest of idols
28. Apelles, bishop of Smyrna
29. Aristobulus, bishop of Britain
30. Narcissus, bishop of Athens
31. Herodion, bishop of Tarsus
32. Agabus the prophet
33. Rufus, bishop of Thebes
34. Asyncritus, bishop of Hyrcania
35. Phlegon, bishop of Marathon
36. Hermes, bishop of Dalmatia
37. Patrobulus, bishop of Puteoli
38. Hermas, bishop of Philippopolis (Thrace)
39. Linus, bishop of Rome
40. Caius, bishop of Ephesus
41. Philologus, bishop of Sinope
42. Olympus and ...
43. ...Rhodion were martyred in Rome
44. Lucius, bishop of Laodicea in Syria
45. Jason, bishop of Tarsus
46. Sosipater, bishop of Iconium
47. Tertius, bishop of Iconium
48. Erastus, bishop of Paneas
49. Quartus, bishop of Berytus
50. Apollos, bishop of Cæsarea
51. Cephas, bishop of Iconium of Colophon
52. Sosthenes, bishop of Colophonia
53. Tychicus, bishop of Colophonia
54. Epaphroditus, bishop of Andriaca (there are at least two ancient towns called Andriaca, one in Thrace and one in Asia Minor),
55. Cæsar, bishop of Dyrrachium
56. Mark, cousin to Barnabas, bishop of Apollonia
57. Justus, bishop of Eleutheropolis
58. Artemas, bishop of Lystra
59. Clement, bishop of Sardis
60. Onesiphorus, bishop of Corone
61. Tychicus, bishop of Chalcedon
62. Carpus, bishop of Berytus in Thrace
63. Evodius, bishop of Antioch
64. Aristarchus, bishop of Apamea
65. Mark, who is also John, bishop of Byblos
66. Zenas, bishop of Diospolis
67. Philemon, bishop of Gaza
68. Aristarchus, bishop of Apamea
69. Pudens
70. Trophimus, who was martyred along with Paul

=== Book of the Bee ===
Similar to an earlier list attributed to Irenaeus, Bishop Solomon of Basra of the Church of the East in the 13th century Book of the Bee offers the following list:

1. James, the son of Joseph
2. Simon the son of Cleopas
3. Cleopas, his father
4. Joses
5. Simon
6. Judah
7. Barnabas
8. Manaeus (?)
9. Ananias, who baptised Paul
10. Cephas, who preached at Antioch
11. Joseph the senator
12. Nicodemus the Archon
13. Nathaniel the chief scribe
14. Justus, that is Joseph, who is called Barshabbâ
15. Silas
16. Judah
17. John, surnamed Mark
18. Mnason, who received Paul
19. Manaël, the foster-brother of Herod
20. Simon called Niger
21. Jason, who is (mentioned) in the Acts (of the apostles)
22. Rufus
23. Alexander
24. Simon the Cyrenian, their father
25. Lucius the Cyrenian
26. Another Judah, who is mentioned in the Acts (of the apostles)
27. Judah, who is called Simon
28. Eurion (Orion) the splay-footed
29. Thôrus (?)
30. Thorîsus (?)
31. Zabdon
32. Zakron
  These are the seven who were chosen with Stephen:
33. Philip the Evangelist, who had three daughters that used to prophesy
34. Stephen
35. Prochorus
36. Nicanor
37. Timon
38. Parmenas
39. Nicolaus, the Antiochian proselyte
  [the next three are listed with the preceding seven]
40. Andronicus the Greek
41. Titus
42. Timothy
  These are the five who were with Peter in Rome:
43. Hermas [of Philippopolis]
44. Plîgtâ
45. Patrobas
46. Asyncritus
47. Hermas [of Dalmatia]
  These are the six [sic; seven names follow] who came with Peter to Cornelius:
48. Criscus (Crescens)
49. Milichus
50. Kîrîțôn (Crito)
51. Simon
52. Gaius, who received Paul
53. Abrazon (?)
54. Apollos
  These are the twelve who were rejected from among the seventy, as Judas Iscariot was from among the twelve, because they absolutely denied our Lord's divinity at the instigation of Cerinthus. Of these Luke [recte 1 John] said, "They went out from us, but they were not of us;" and Paul called them "false apostles and deceitful workers".
  1. Simon
  2. Levi
  3. Bar-Ḳubbâ
  4. Cleon
  5. Hymenaeus
  6. Candarus
  7. Clithon (?)
  8. Demas
  9. Narcissus
  10. Slikîspus (?)
  11. Thaddaeus
  12. Mârûthâ
  In their stead there came in these:
55. Luke the physician
56. Apollos the elect
57. Ampelius
58. Urbanus
59. Stachys
60. Popillius (or Publius)
61. Aristobulus
62. Stephen (not the Corinthian)
63. Herodion the son of Narcissus
64. Olympas
65. Mark the Evangelist
66. Addai
67. Aggai
68. Mâr Mârî

=== Others ===
Other lists are

- One attributed to Dorotheus of Tyre, completed some time before AD 811.
- One attributed to Epiphanius of Salamis

Matthias, who would later replace Judas Iscariot as one of the twelve apostles, is also often numbered among the seventy.

Some accounts of the legendary Saint Mantius of Évora regard him as one of the disciples, having witnessed the Last Supper and Pentecost.

== See also ==
- Dispersion of the Apostles
- Life of Jesus in the New Testament
