= Prochorus (deacon) =

Early Christian saint and bishop

Saint Prochorus
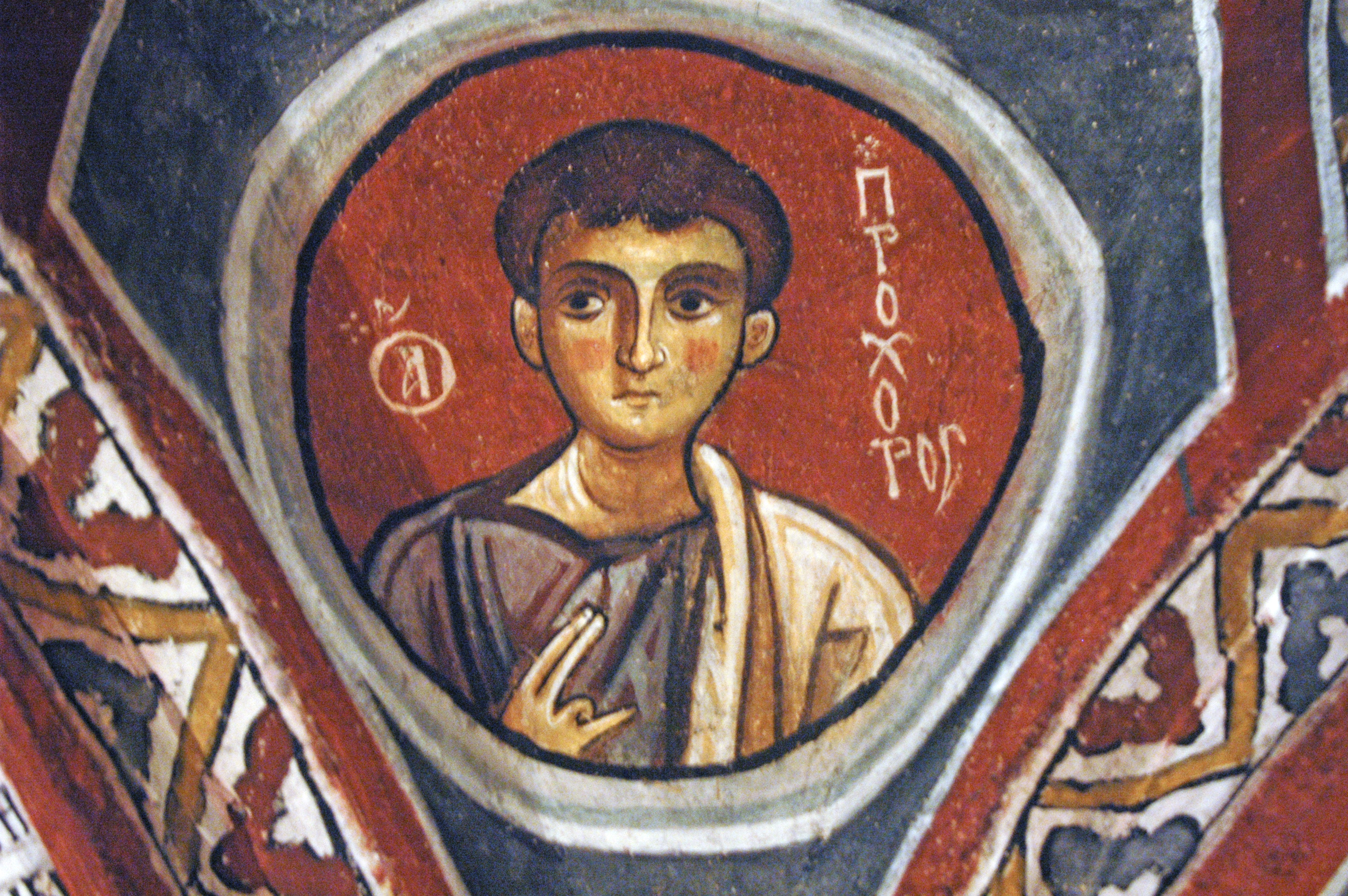
- 11th-century Eastern Orthodox fresco and icon in the Dark Church, Göreme, Turkey

Bishop of Nicomedia Deacon Hieromartyr Apostle of the Seventy One of the Seven Deacons
- Died: 1st century AD; Antioch, Province of Syria, Roman Empire
- Venerated in: Eastern Orthodox Church; Oriental Orthodox Churches; Catholic Church
- Canonized: Pre-congregation
- Feast: 9 April (Catholic); 28 July (Orthodox); 20 Tobi (Coptic)
- Attributes: depicted as a scribe taking dictation of the Book of Revelation from Saint John the Theologian

Prochorus (Greek: Πρόχορος, Prochoros) was one of the Seven Deacons chosen to care for the poor of the Christian community in Jerusalem (Acts 6:5). According to holy tradition, he was also one of the Seventy Disciples sent out by Jesus in Luke 10.

Tradition calls Prochorus the nephew of Saint Stephen the Protomartyr. Prochorus accompanied Saint Peter, who ordained him to be the bishop in the city of Nicomedia. A variant tradition saw him as a companion of Saint John the Apostle, consecrated by the latter as bishop of Nicomedia in Bithynia. Some modern scholars dispute his having been the author of the apocryphal Acts of John, which is dated by them to the end of the 2nd century. According to the later tradition, he was the bishop of Antioch and ended his life as a martyr in Antioch in the 1st century.

In Orthodox iconography, Prochorus is depicted as a scribe of John the Theologian. He is one of four out of the Seven Deacons of the Seventy Apostles to be jointly celebrated on 28 July.

== Gallery ==
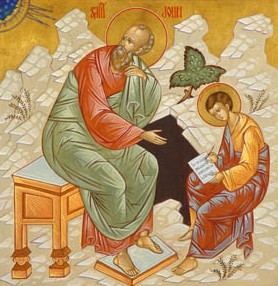
John the Evangelist with Prochorus

Prochorus and St John depicted in Xoranasat's gospel manuscript in 1224.
