= Parmenas =

1st-century Christian deacon and saint

Saint Parmenas

Martyr
- Died: 98; Philippi, Macedonia
- Venerated in: Catholic Church, Eastern Orthodox Church
- Feast: 23 January

Parmenas (Greek: Παρμενᾶς) was one of the Seven Deacons appointed to serve the early Christian church as recorded in the Acts of the Apostles, where his name appears sixth in the list of the seven. He is believed to have preached the gospel in Asia Minor. Parmenas suffered martyrdom in 98, under the persecution of Trajan.

Christian tradition identifies him as the Bishop of Soli. Some historians take this to be Soli, Cyprus, while others interpret it as Soli, Cilicia. He is one of the four deacons jointly celebrated on 23 January.
