= Ampliatus =

Roman Christian mentioned by Paul in one of his letters

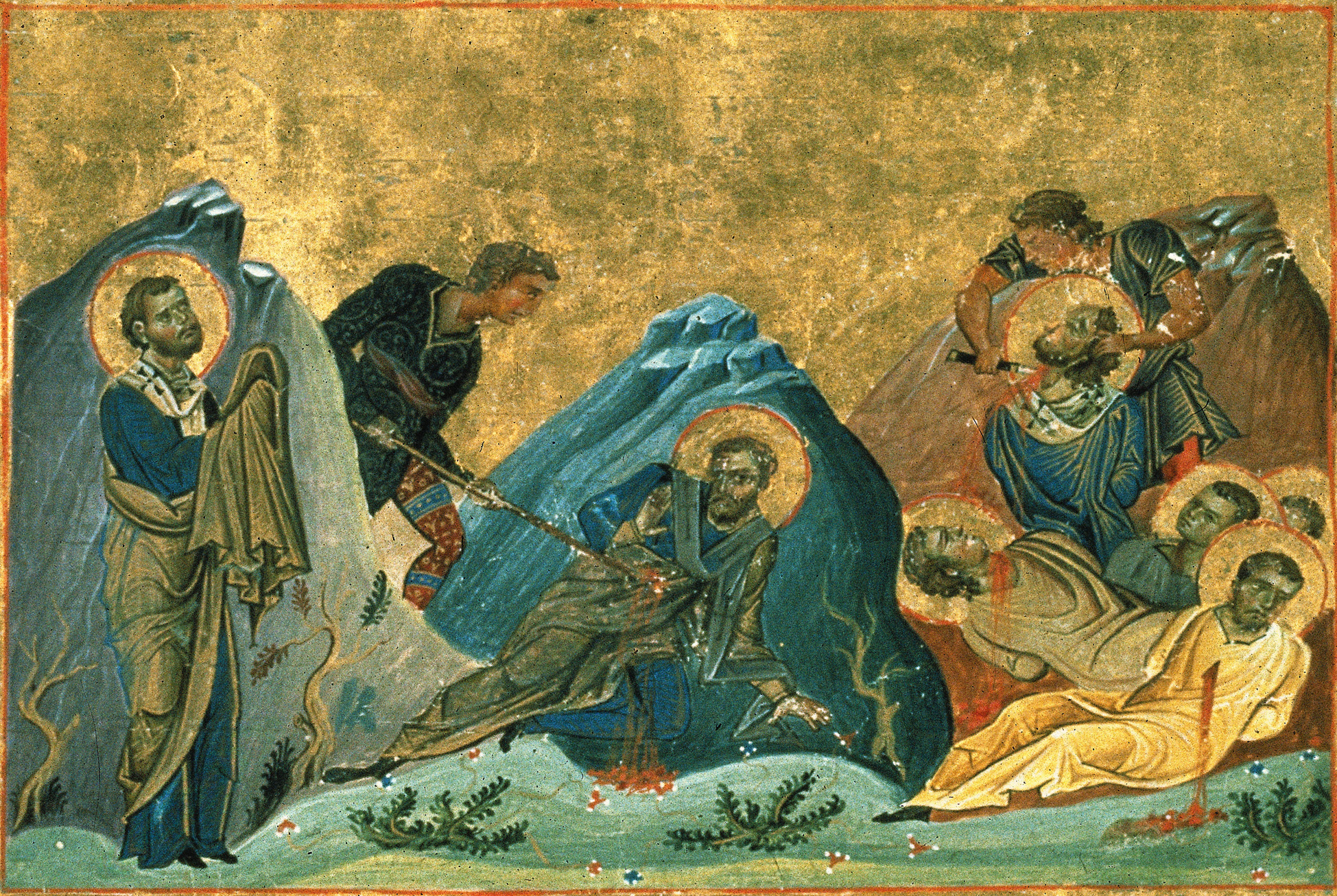
Stachys, Amplias, Urban (Menologion of Basil II)

Ampliatus or Amplias (in the King James Version; Greek: Αμπλίατος) was a Roman Christian mentioned by Paul in one of his letters, where he says, "Greet Ampliatus, whom I love in the Lord." (Romans 16:8) He is considered one of the Seventy Disciples by the Eastern Orthodox Church. Tradition has it that he and his companions subsequently attached themselves to the Apostle Saint Andrew, and ultimately died martyrs.

He may have served as bishop of Odessos (Varna), in modern Bulgaria. He is commemorated in the Roman Martyrology on Oct. 31.

== Hymns ==
Troparion (Tone 3)

Holy Apostles of the Seventy: Stáchys, Amplías, Úrban,
Narcíssus, Apélles, and Aristobúlus,
entreat the merciful God
to grant our souls forgiveness of transgressions.

Kontakion (Tone 8)

Let us thankfully praise the wise Apostles
Stáchys, Amplías, Úrban, Narcíssus, Apélles, and Aristobúlus,
those treasures of the Holy Spirit and rays of the Sun of glory,
who were gathered together by the grace of our God.
