= July 30 (Eastern Orthodox liturgics) =

Day in the Eastern Orthodox liturgical calendar

Eastern Orthodox liturgical calendar
July 29	July 30	July 31
July 30 O.S. ≍ August 12 N.S. July 30 N.S ≍ July 17 O.S.

An Eastern Orthodox cross

July 30 in Eastern Orthodox liturgical calendars is a feast day and a day of commemoration of saints and martyrs. Although some Orthodox churches use the Revised Julian Calendar and others use the traditional Julian calendar, the fixed commemorations for their respective July 30 are broadly the same, no matter which calendar is used. (Note: Despite the dates being the same, the days to which they refer typically differ by 13 days. The notation Old Style or O.S. is sometimes used to indicate a date in the traditional Julian Calendar (the "Old Calendar"). The notation New Style or N.S. indicates a date in the Revised Julian calendar (the "New Calendar").)

== Saints ==
- Apostles of the Seventy Silas and Silvanus, and with them Apostles Crescens, Epenetus, and Andronicus (1st century) (Note: Name days celebrated today include: Andronicus (Ἀνδρόνικος).)
- Martyrs under Decius (c. 251):

- Hieromartyr Polychronius, Bishop of Babylon in Egypt;
- Hieromartyrs Parmenius, Helimenas (Elimas), and Chrysotelus, Priests;
- Luke and Mocius, Deacons;
- Martyrs Maximus and Olympius.

- Martyrs Abdon and Sennen, princes of Persia, at Rome (251) (Note: Persian nobles brought to Rome as prisoners, they devoted themselves to looking after imprisoned Christians and burying the relics of the martyrs.) (Note: "AT Rome, in the reign of Decius, the holy Persian martyrs Abdon and Sennen, who were bound with chains, brought to Rome, scourged with leaded whips for the faith of Christ, and then put to the sword.")
- Hieromartyr Valentine, Bishop of Interamna (Terni) in Italy, and his martyred disciples Proculus, Ephebus, Apollonius, and Abundius (c. 273) (see also: February 14, July 6)
- Martyr John the Soldier, at Tralles in Asia Minor (361-363) (see also: July 29)
- Martyr Julitta of Caesarea in Cappadocia (4th century) (Note: "At Caesarea, in Cappadocia, St. Julitta, martyr. As she sought to recover through the courts the restitution of goods seized by an influential personage, the latter objected that, being a Christian, her cause could not be pleaded. The judge commanded her to offer sacrifice to the idols, that she might be heard. With great firmness, she refused, and being thrown into the fire, yielded her spirit to God, though her body remained uninjured by the flames. St. Basil the Great has proclaimed her praise in an excellent eulogy.")

== Pre-Schism Western saints ==
- Saint Rufinus of Assisi, a martyr in one of the early persecutions in Assisi in Italy. (Note: "At Assisi, in Umbria, St. Rufinus, martyr.")
- Saints Maxima, Donatilla and Secunda, three holy virgins (Secunda was aged twelve), martyred in Tebourba in North Africa under Diocletian (304) (Note: "At Tuberbum Lucernarium, in Africa, the holy virgins and martyrs Maxima, Donatilla, and Secunda. The first two, in the persecution of Valerian and Gallienus, were forced to drink vinegar and gall, then scourged most severely, and stretched on the rack, burned on the gridiron, rubbed over with lime, afterwards exposed to the beasts with the virgin Secunda, twelve years old, but being untouched by them, they were finally beheaded.")
- Saint Peter Chrysologus, Archbishop of Ravenna (c. 450) (Note: Born in Imola in Italy, he became deacon there, and then archdeacon and Archbishop of Ravenna (c 433). He is famed for his eloquence in preaching, thus the name Chrysologus, 'Golden Speech'. Many of his sermons still exist.)
- Saint Ursus of Auxerre, a hermit at the church of St Amator in Auxerre in France, who was made bishop of that city when he was aged seventy-five (508) (Note: "At Auxerre, St. Ursus, bishop and confessor.")
- Saint Ermengyth, a sister of St Ermenburgh, she lived as a nun at Minster-in-Thanet in England (c. 680)
- Saint Tatwine, the tenth Archbishop of Canterbury (734) (Note: A monk at Breedon in Mercia in England who was famed for his piety and learning. He succeeded St Brithwald, becoming the tenth Archbishop of Canterbury.)
- Martyr-King Olaf II Haraldsson, Enlightener of Norway (1030)

== Post-Schism Orthodox saints ==
- Saint Stephen Vladislav of Serbia (1243) (see also: September 24)
- Prince Tsotne Dadiani the Confessor, of Mingrelia, Georgia (13th century)
- Saint Angelina (Brancovic), Despotina of Serbia (c. 1520)

=== New martyrs and confessors ===
- New Hieromartyr John Plotnikov, Deacon (1918)
- New Hiero-confessor Anatole II (Potapov) "the Younger", Elder of Optina Monastery (1922) (Note: See: (in Russian) Анатолий (Потапов). Википедии. (Russian Wikipedia).)

== Other commemorations ==
- Uncovering of the relics (1484) of Venerable Herman of Solovki (1479)
- Synaxis of the Saints of Samara.
- Synaxis of the Saints of Aegina.
- Sitka Icon of the Most Holy Theotokos. (see also: July 8)
- Icon of the Mother of God of Okonsk.

== Icon gallery ==
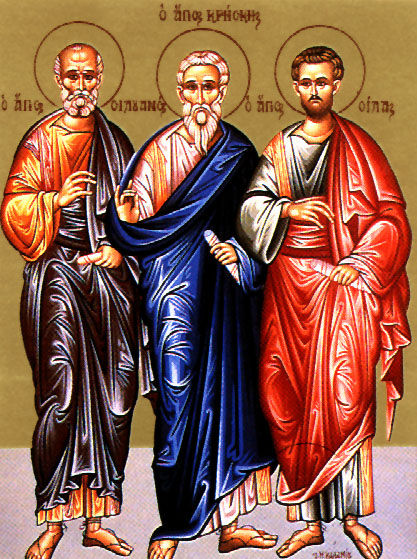
Apostles Silvanus, Crescens and Silas.

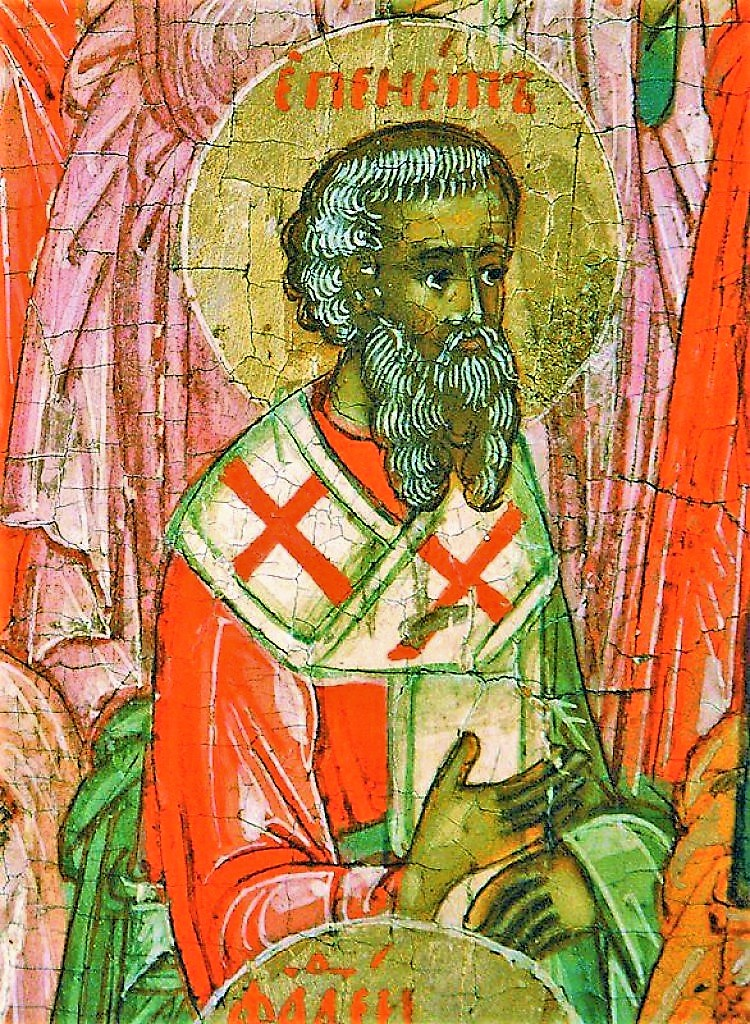
Apsotle Epenetus of Carthage.

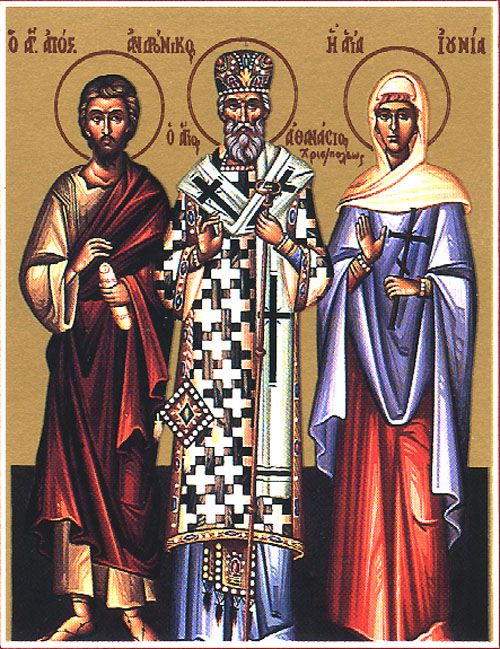
Apostle Andronicus of Pannonia, with Athanasius of Christianoupolis and Junia.

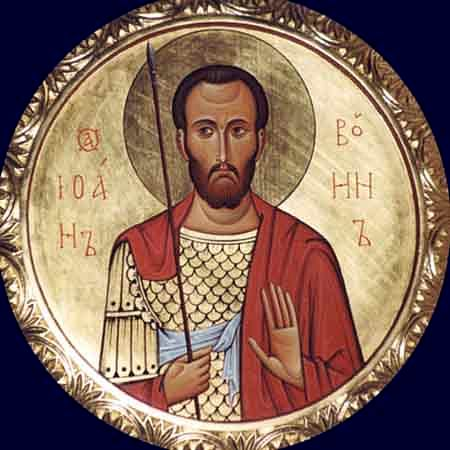
St. John the Warrior.

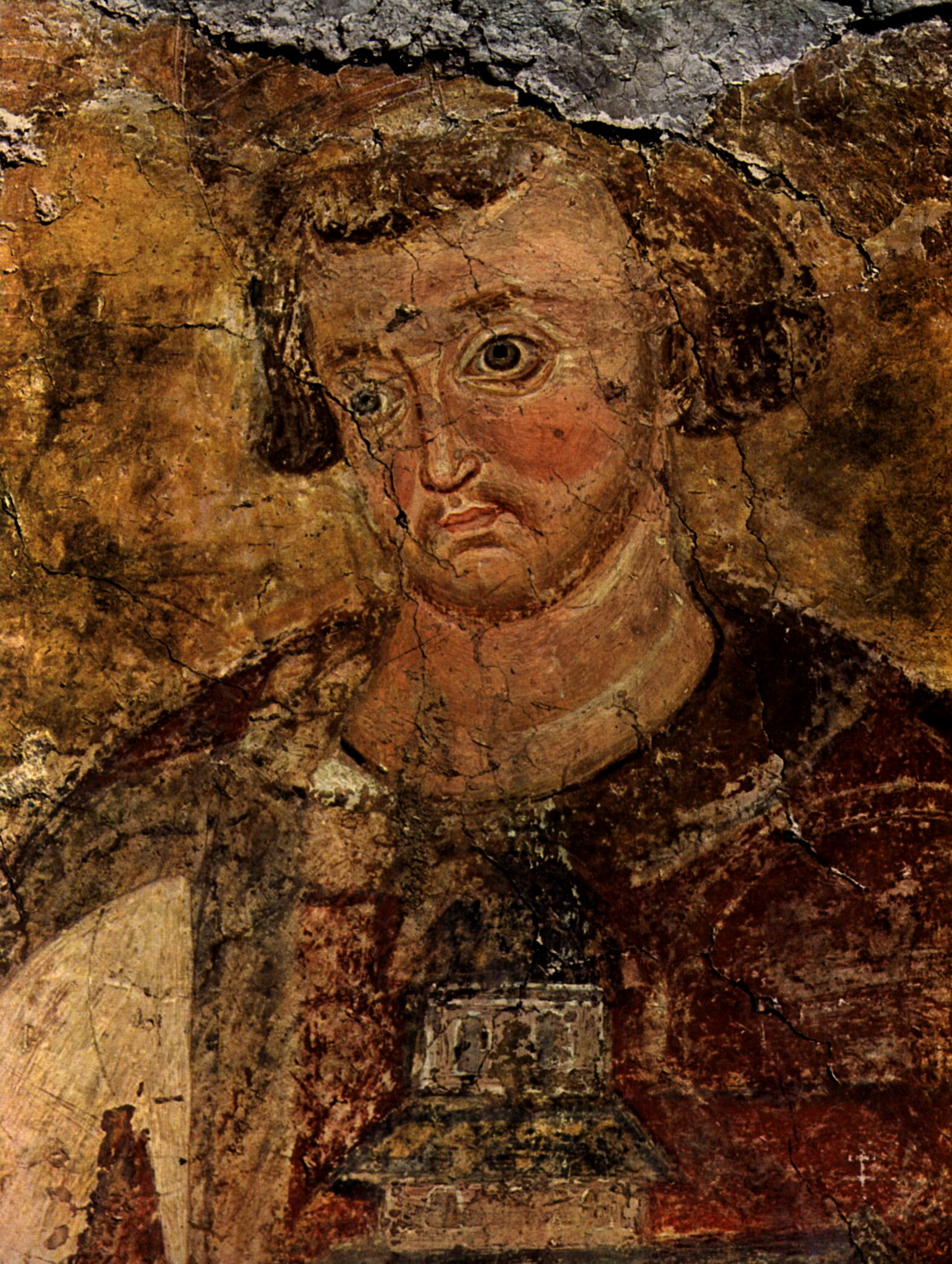
St. Stephen Vladislav of Serbia.

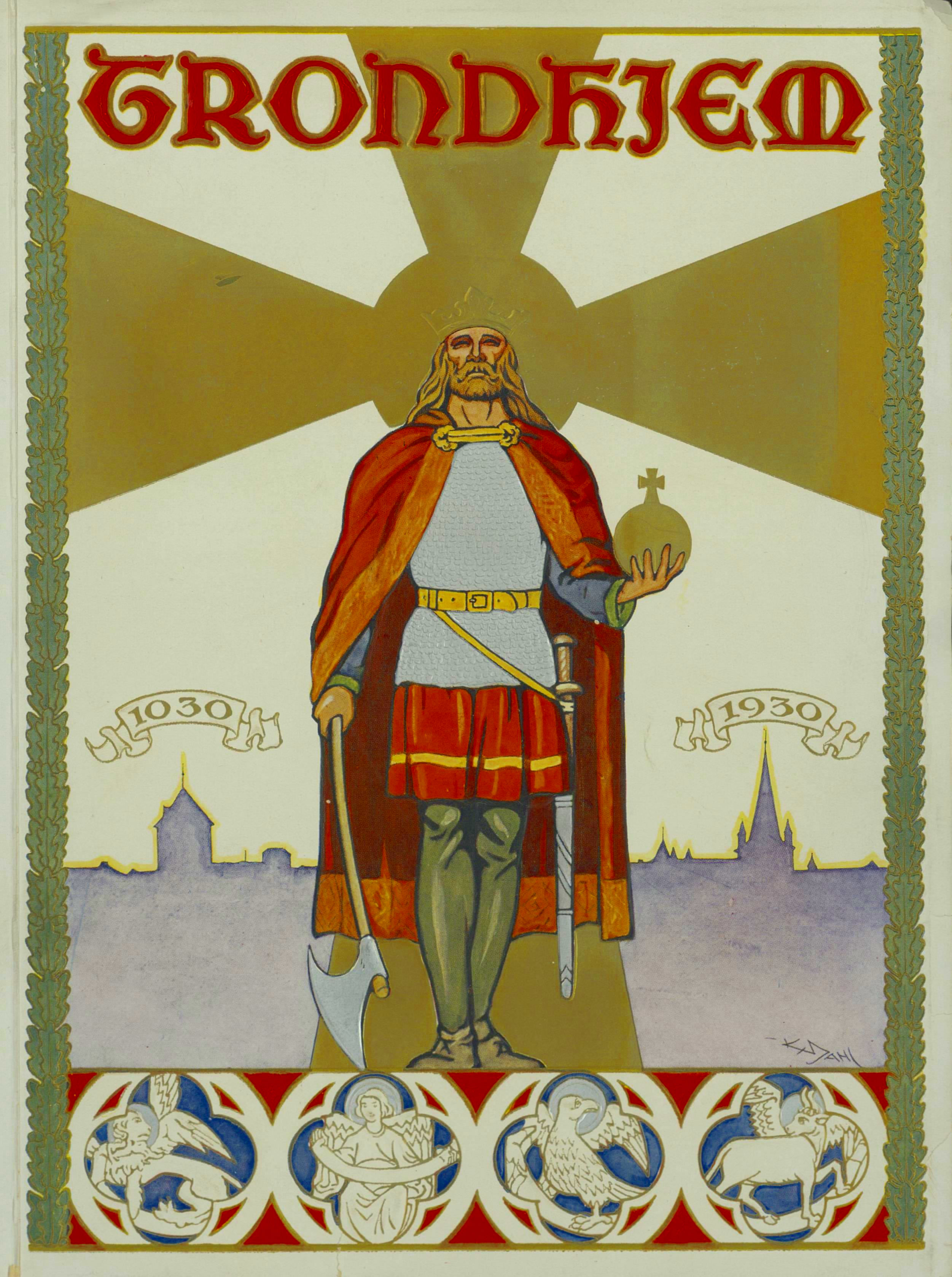
Martyr-King Olaf II Haraldsson, Enlightener of Norway.

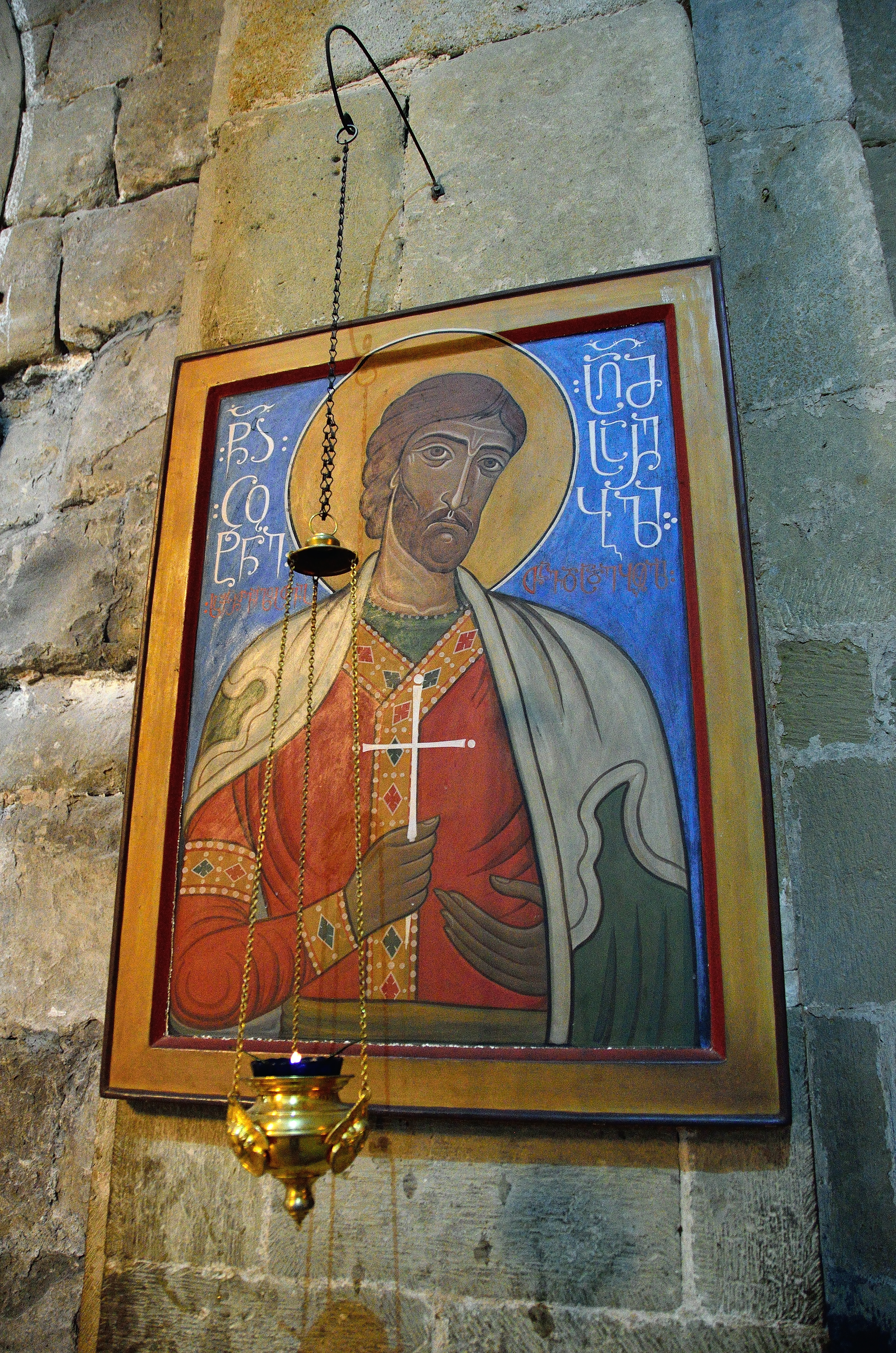
St. Tsotne Dadiani the Confessor.

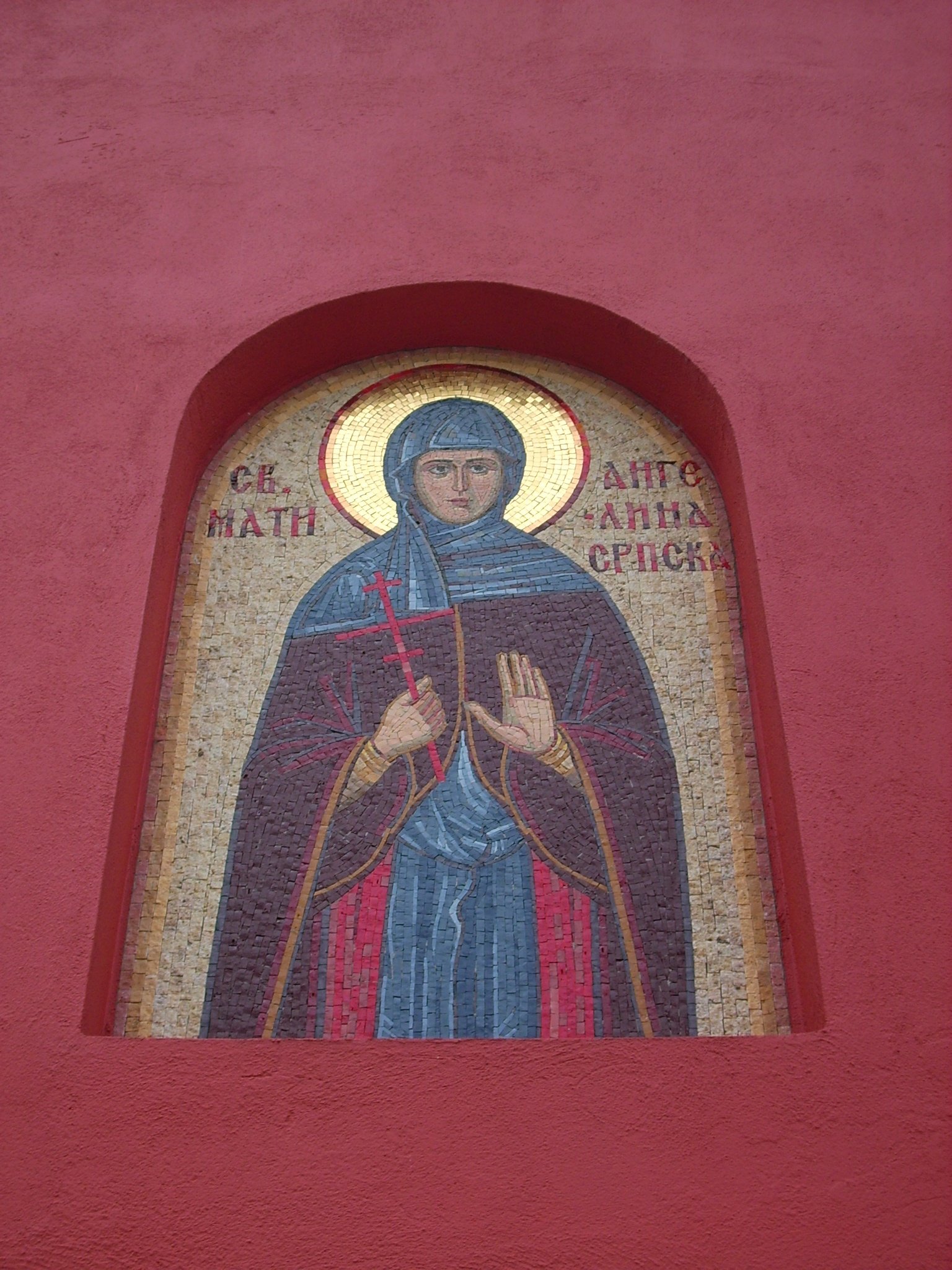
St. Angelina (Brancovic), Despotina of Serbia.

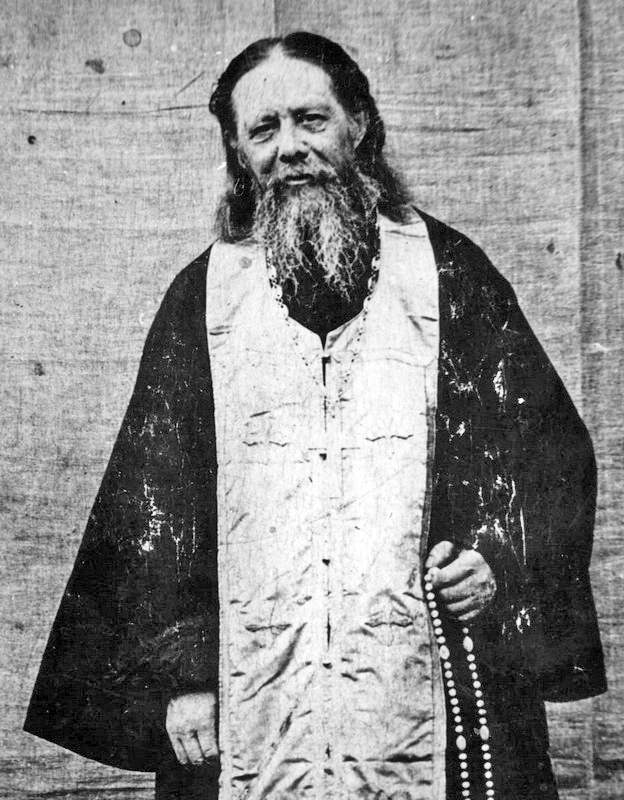
New Hiero-confessor Anatole II (Potapov) "the Younger", Elder of Optina Monastery.

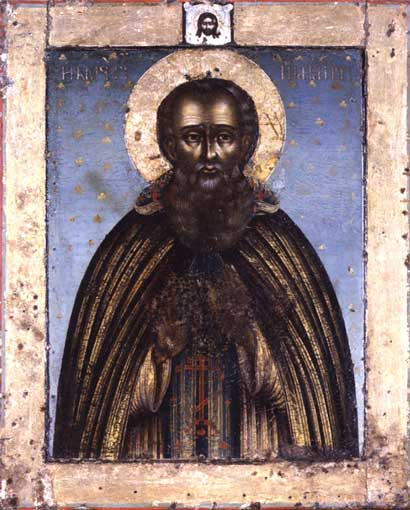
Venerable Herman of Solovki.

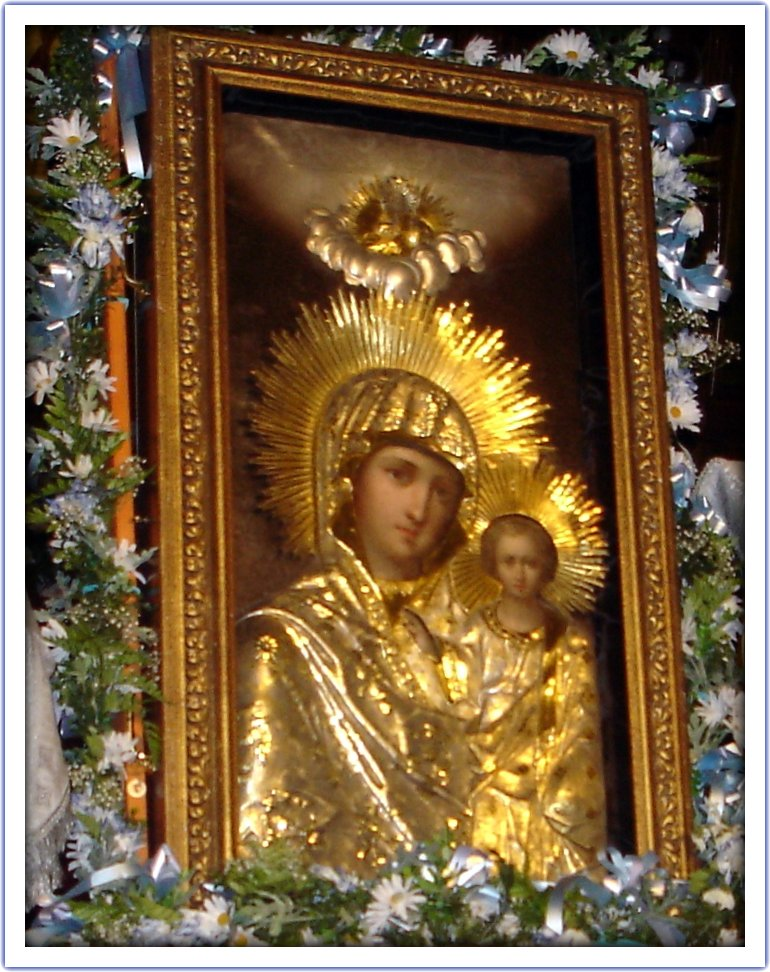
Sitka Icon of the Most Holy Theotokos.

== Sources ==
- July 30/August 12. Orthodox Calendar (pravoslavie.ru).
- August 12 / July 30. Holy Trinity Russian Orthodox Church (a parish of the Patriarchate of Moscow).
- July 30. OCA - The Lives of the Saints.
- July 30. The Year of Our Salvation - Holy Transfiguration Monastery, Brookline, Massachusetts.
- The Autonomous Orthodox Metropolia of Western Europe and the Americas (ROCOR). St. Hilarion Calendar of Saints for the year of our Lord 2004. St. Hilarion Press (Austin, TX). p. 56.
- The Thirtieth Day of the Month of July. Orthodoxy in China.
- July 30. Latin Saints of the Orthodox Patriarchate of Rome.
- The Roman Martyrology. Transl. by the Archbishop of Baltimore. Last Edition, According to the Copy Printed at Rome in 1914. Revised Edition, with the Imprimatur of His Eminence Cardinal Gibbons. Baltimore: John Murphy Company, 1916. p. 226.
- Rev. Richard Stanton. A Menology of England and Wales, or, Brief Memorials of the Ancient British and English Saints Arranged According to the Calendar, Together with the Martyrs of the 16th and 17th Centuries. London: Burns & Oates, 1892. pp. 368–371.

=== Greek Sources ===
- Great Synaxaristes: (in Greek) 30 ΙΟΥΛΙΟΥ. ΜΕΓΑΣ ΣΥΝΑΞΑΡΙΣΤΗΣ.
- (in Greek) Συναξαριστής. 30 Ιουλίου. ecclesia.gr. (H ΕΚΚΛΗΣΙΑ ΤΗΣ ΕΛΛΑΔΟΣ).
- (in Greek) 30/07/2026. Ορθόδοξος Συναξαριστής.

=== Russian Sources ===
- (in Russian) 12 августа (30 июля). Православная Энциклопедия под редакцией Патриарха Московского и всея Руси Кирилла (электронная версия). (Orthodox Encyclopedia - Pravenc.ru).
- (in Russian) 30 июля по старому стилю / 12 августа по новому стилю. СПЖ "Союз православных журналистов". 2026.
