= July 29 (Eastern Orthodox liturgics) =

Day in the Eastern Orthodox liturgical calendar

Eastern Orthodox liturgical calendar
July 28	July 29	July 30
July 29 O.S. ≍ August 11 N.S. July 29 N.S ≍ July 16 O.S.

An Eastern Orthodox cross

July 29 in Eastern Orthodox liturgical calendars is a feast day and a day of commemoration of saints and martyrs. Although some Orthodox churches use the Revised Julian Calendar and others use the traditional Julian calendar, the fixed commemorations for their respective July 29 are broadly the same, no matter which calendar is used. (Note: Despite the dates being the same, the days to which they refer typically differ by 13 days. The notation Old Style or O.S. is sometimes used to indicate a date in the traditional Julian Calendar (the "Old Calendar"). The notation New Style or N.S. indicates a date in the Revised Julian calendar (the "New Calendar").)

== Saints ==
- Virgin-martyr Seraphima (Serapia) of Antioch (c. 117-138) (Note: A slave of Syrian descent who was beheaded in Rome under Hadrian.) (Note: "At Mamia, St. Seraphina.")
- Martyr Kallinikos of Cilicia in Asia Minor (c. 250) (Note: "At Gangra, in Paphlagonia, St. Callinicus, martyr, who was scourged with iron rods, and given over to other torments. Being finally cast into a furnace, he gave up his soul to God.") (Note: Name days celebrated today include: Kallinikos (Καλλίνικος).)
- Martyr Theodota and her three sons in Bithynia (c. 304)
- Martyrs Benjamin and Berius, by the Palace of the Hebdomon.
- Martyr Mamas, by drowning.
- Martyr Basiliscus the Elder, by the sword.
- Martyr Ioannis.
- The holy Martyrs, a father and mother, with their two children, by fire.
- Blessed John the Soldier (c. 361) (see also: July 30)
- Saint Theodosius the Younger, the pious emperor (450)
- Martyr Eustathius the Cobbler of Mtskheta, Georgia (589)
- Saint Constantine I, Patriarch of Constantinople (677) (Note: The Greek sources propose that the intended commemoration for July 29th for "Patriarch Constantine" is actually Constantine III Leichoudes († 1063).) (see also: August 9)

== Pre-Schism Western saints ==
- Saints Simplicius, Faustinus and Beatrix, two brothers and their sister martyred in Rome under Diocletian (c. 303) (Note: "Also at Rome, on the road to Porto, the holy martyrs Simplicius, Faustinus, and Beatrix, in the time of the emperor Diocletian. The first two, after being subjected to many different torments, were condemned to suffer capital punishment; Beatrix, their sister, was smothered in prison.")
- Saint Faustinus (4th century) (Note: A disciple of St Felix, Bishop of Martano near Spoleto in Italy, he was present at his martyrdom. St Faustinus suffered for Christ before reposing peacefully in Todi in Umbria.) (Note: "At Todi, St. Faustinus, confessor.")
- Saint Prosper of Orleans, Bishop of Orleans in France (c.453) (Note: "Also, the demise of blessed Prosper, bishop of Orleans.")
- Saint Lupus the Confessor, Bishop of Troyes, Gaul (479) (Note: Born in Toul in France, he married the sister of St Hilary. After seven years, husband and wife separated by mutual consent, Lupus becoming a monk at Lérins. In 426 he became Bishop of Troyes. He accompanied St Germanus of Auxerre to Britain to oppose Pelagianism. In 453 he succeeded in saving Troyes from Attila. He reposed at the age of ninety-four.) (Note: "At Troyes, in France, St. Lupus, bishop and confessor, who went with blessed Germanus to England to combat the Pelagian heresy, and by assiduous prayer defended the city of Troyes from the furor of Attila, who was devastating all France. At length, having religiously discharged the functions of the priesthood for fifty-two years, he rested in peace.")
- Saint Sulien (Sulian, Silin), born in Brittany, he founded a small monastery in Luxulyan in Cornwall (6th century)
- Saint Kilian, an abbot of a monastery on the island of Inis Cealtra in Ireland, and author of a Life of St Brigid (7th century)
- Saint Olaf II of Norway (Olav, Tola), King of Norway (1030) (Note: Son of King Harald of Norway. His early youth was spent as a pirate but in 1010 he was baptised in Rouen in France and in 1013 he helped Ethelred of England against the Danes. In 1015 he succeeded to the throne of Norway and at once called missionaries, mainly from England, to enlighten his homeland. He succeeded in part but was driven from his kingdom. In an attempt to recover it, he fell in battle at Stiklestad. In Norway he is regarded as the champion of national independence.) (Note: "In Norway, St. Olaf, king and martyr.")

== Post-Schism Orthodox saints ==
- Saint Constantine III Leichoudes, Patriarch of Constantinople (1063)
- Saints Constantine (Note: See: (in Russian) Константин Косинский (преподобный). Википедии. (Russian Wikipedia).) and Cosmas (Note: See: (in Russian) Косма Косинский. Википедии. (Russian Wikipedia).) of Kosinsk, in Pskov, Abbots (13th century)
- Saint Romanus of Kirzach, founder of Kirzhach Monastery, disciple of St. Sergius of Radonezh (1392)
- Saint Bogolep, Child Schemamonk of Chorny Yar, near Astrakhan (1667)
- Hieromartyr Bessarion of Smolyan, Bulgaria (1670) (Note: See: (in Bulgarian) Висарион Смоленски. Уикипедия. (Bulgarian Wikipedia).)
- Martyr Daniel Kushnir of Mlievich (Daniel of Cherkassk), Ukraine (1766)

=== New martyrs and confessors ===
- New Hieromartyrs Seraphim (Bogoslovsky) and Theognostus (Pivovarov), Hieromonks of a skete at Kyzyl-Zharskoe, Kazakhstan (1921)
- New Hieromartyr Anatole (Smirnov), Hieromonk and hermit of the Caucasus Mountains, Abkhazia (1930-1935)
- New Hieromartyr Pachomius (Rusin), Hieromonk, of Alma Ata, Kazakhstan (1938)
- New Hieromartyr Alexis Krasnovsky, Priest (1938)

== Other commemorations ==
- Nativity of St. Nicholas the Wonderworker, Archbishop of Myra in Lycia (3rd century)
- Icon of the Most Holy Theotokos of Rudoe Selo (19th century) (Note: See: (in Ukrainian) Рудосільська ікона. Вікіпедія. (Ukrainian Wikipedia).)
- Repose of Archpriest Georges Florovsky (1979)

== Icon gallery ==
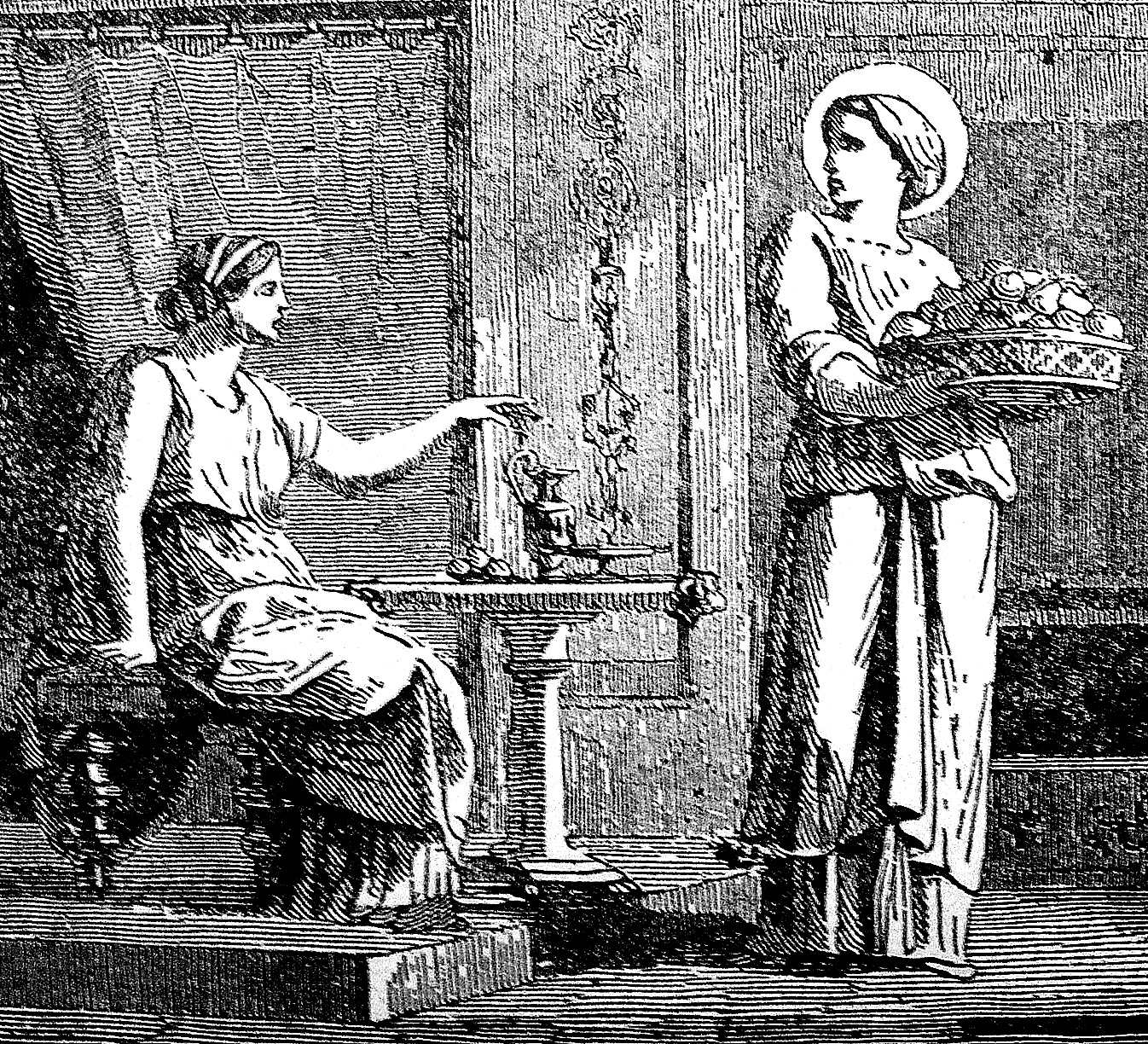
Virgin-martyr Seraphima (Serapia), with her mistress.

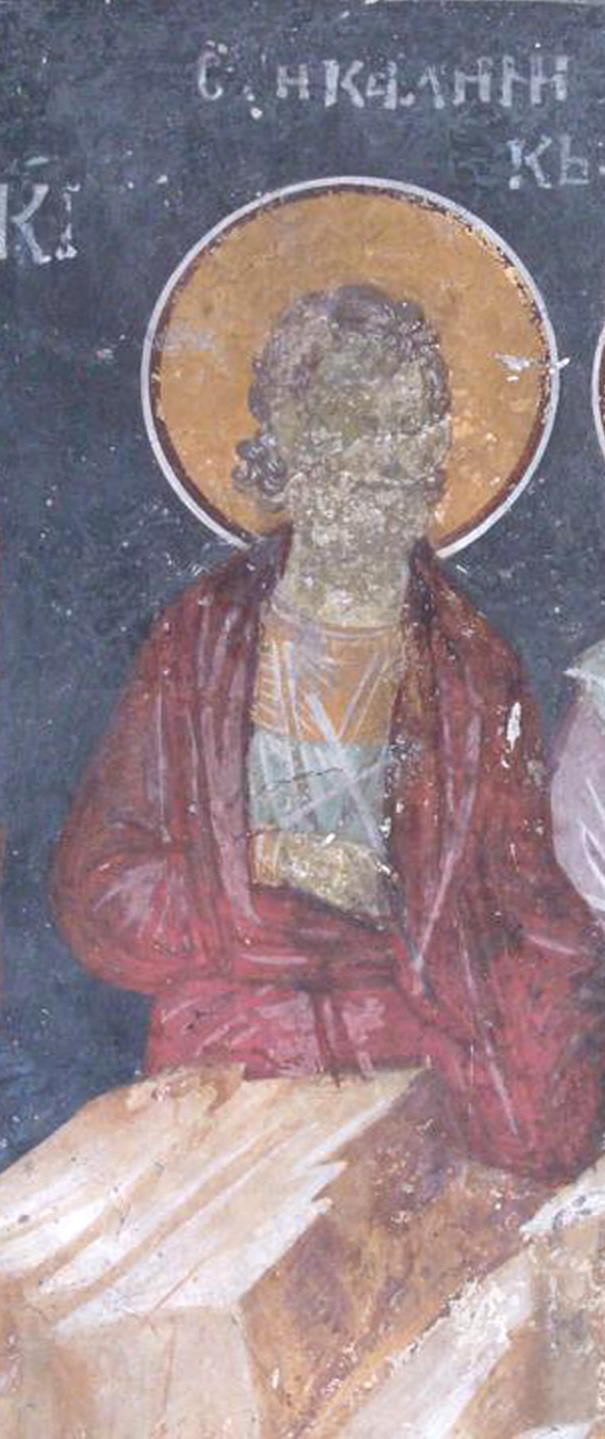
Martyr Kallinikos of Cilicia.

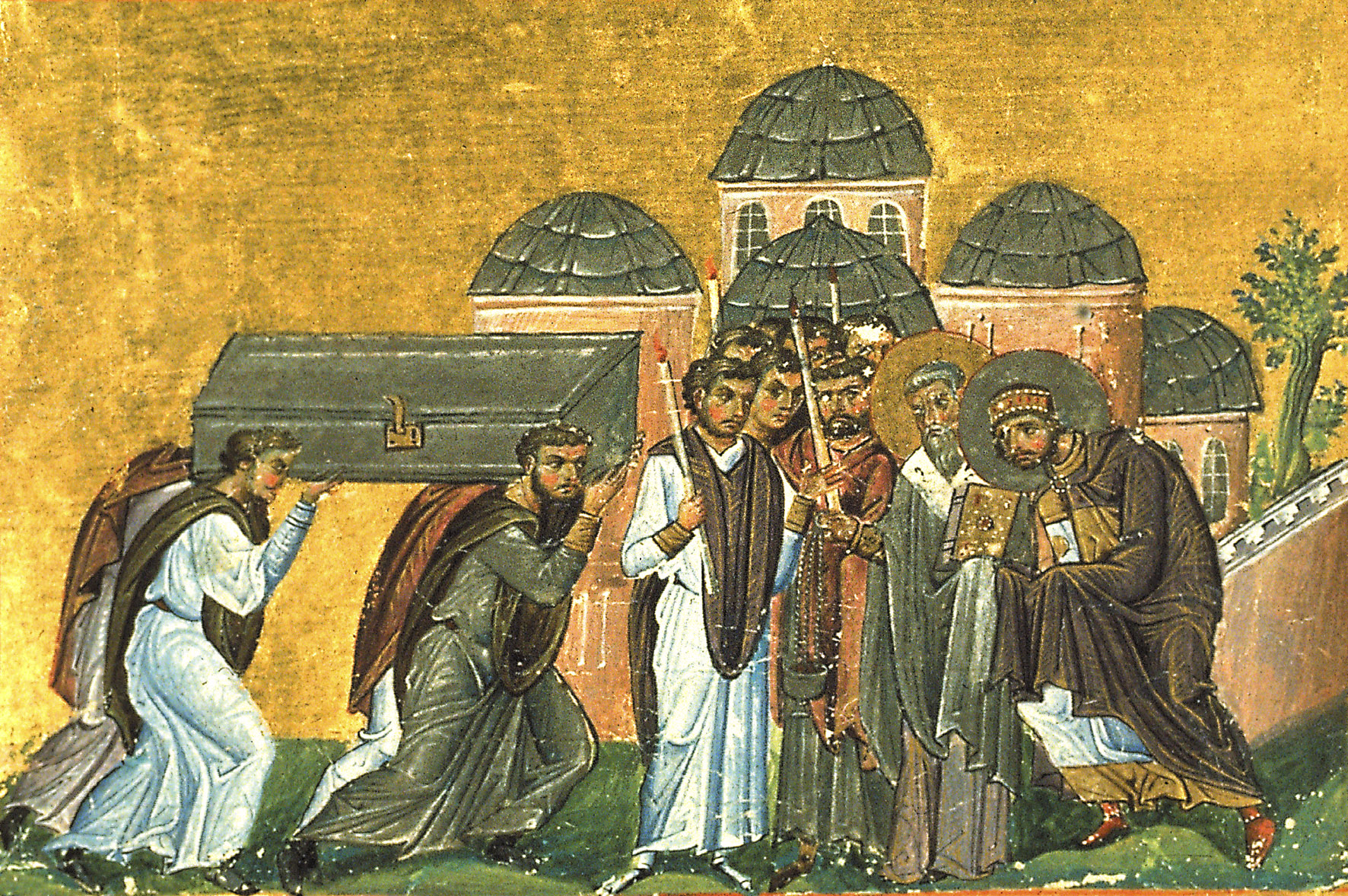
St. Theodosius the Younger welcomes the relics of John Chrysostom.

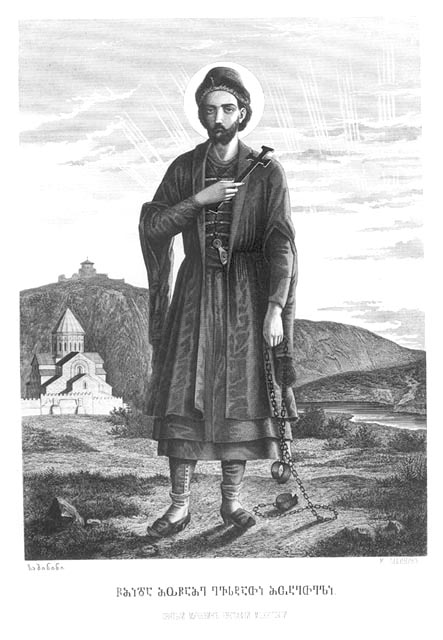
Martyr Eustathius the Cobbler of Mtskheta, Georgia.

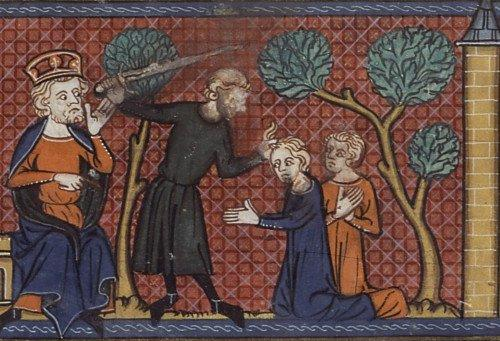
Martyrdom of Sts. Simplicius and Faustinus.

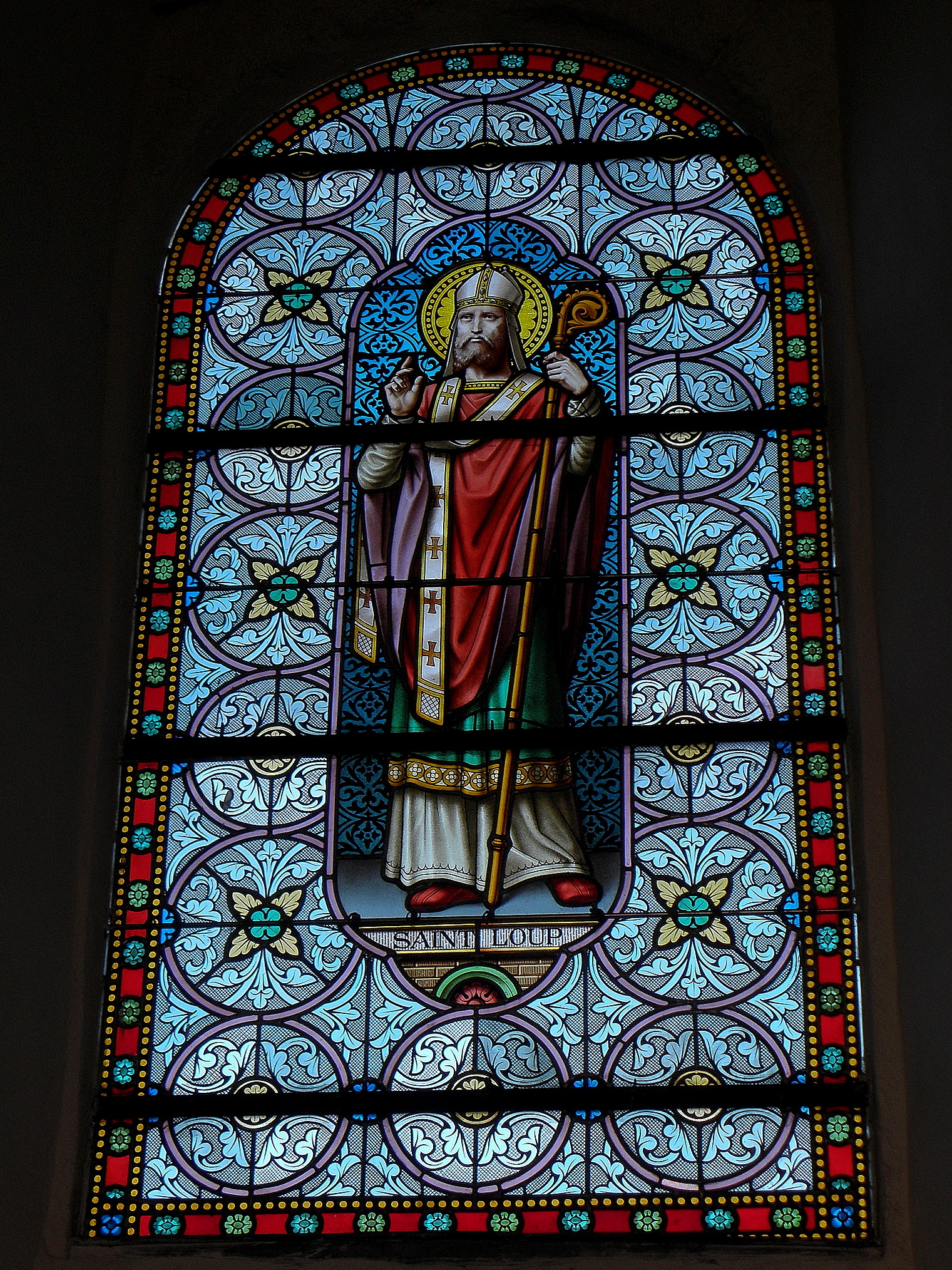
St. Lupus the Confessor, Bishop of Troyes.

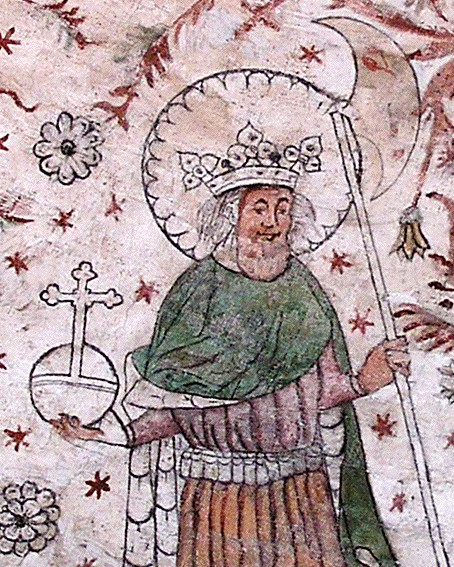
Saint Olaf II of Norway, King of Norway.

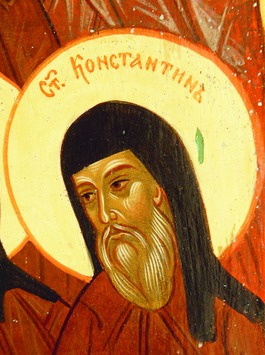
St. Constantine of Kosinsk.

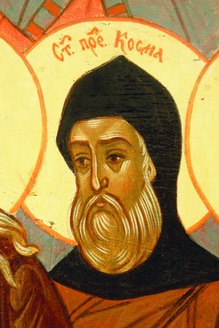
St. Cosmas of Kosinsk.

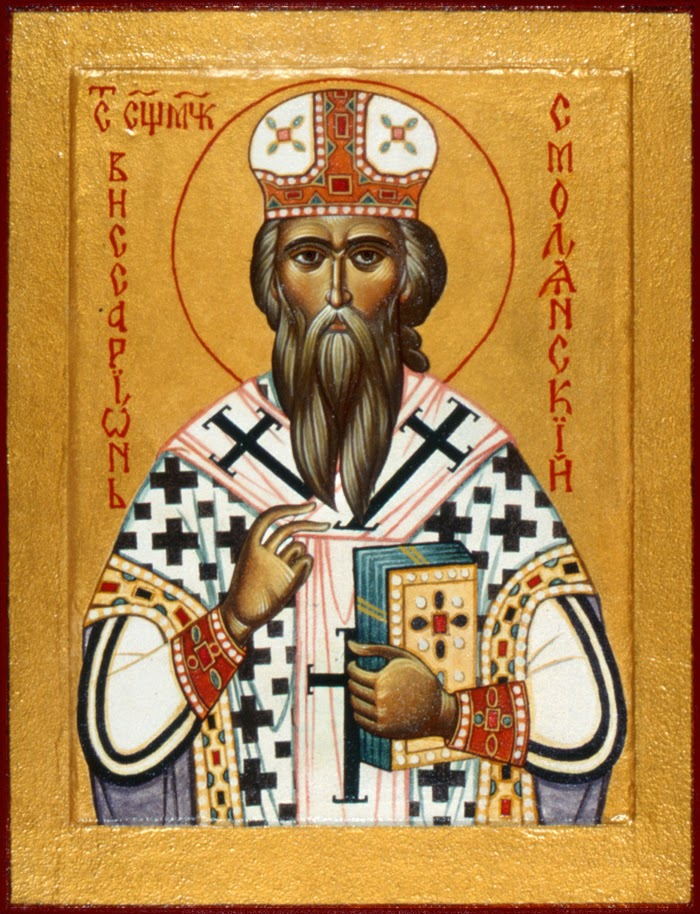
Hieromartyr Bessarion of Smolyan, Bulgaria.

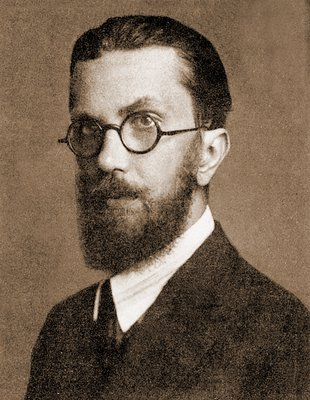
Archpriest Georges Florovsky.

== Sources ==
- July 29/August 11. Orthodox Calendar (PRAVOSLAVIE.RU).
- August 11 / July 29. HOLY TRINITY RUSSIAN ORTHODOX CHURCH (A parish of the Patriarchate of Moscow).
- July 29. OCA - The Lives of the Saints.
- July 29. The Year of Our Salvation - Holy Transfiguration Monastery, Brookline, Massachusetts.
- The Autonomous Orthodox Metropolia of Western Europe and the Americas (ROCOR). St. Hilarion Calendar of Saints for the year of our Lord 2004. St. Hilarion Press (Austin, TX). p. 56.
- The Twenty-Ninth Day of the Month of July. Orthodoxy in China.
- July 29. Latin Saints of the Orthodox Patriarchate of Rome.
- The Roman Martyrology. Transl. by the Archbishop of Baltimore. Last Edition, According to the Copy Printed at Rome in 1914. Revised Edition, with the Imprimatur of His Eminence Cardinal Gibbons. Baltimore: John Murphy Company, 1916. pp. 224–225.
- Rev. Richard Stanton. A Menology of England and Wales, or, Brief Memorials of the Ancient British and English Saints Arranged According to the Calendar, Together with the Martyrs of the 16th and 17th Centuries. London: Burns & Oates, 1892. pp. 367–368.

Greek Sources

- Great Synaxaristes: (in Greek) 29 ΙΟΥΛΙΟΥ. ΜΕΓΑΣ ΣΥΝΑΞΑΡΙΣΤΗΣ.
- (in Greek) Συναξαριστής. 29 Ιουλίου. ECCLESIA.GR. (H ΕΚΚΛΗΣΙΑ ΤΗΣ ΕΛΛΑΔΟΣ).
- (in Greek) 29/07/2026. Ορθόδοξος Συναξαριστής.

Russian Sources

- (in Russian) 11 августа (29 июля). Православная Энциклопедия под редакцией Патриарха Московского и всея Руси Кирилла (электронная версия). (Orthodox Encyclopedia - Pravenc.ru).
- (in Russian) 29 июля по старому стилю / 11 августа по новому стилю. СПЖ "Союз православных журналистов". 2026.
