= Saint Ursus =

Saint Ursus (Orso, Ours) may refer to:

- Ursus of Aosta, 6th-century evangelist
- Ursus of Auxerre, 6th-century bishop
- Ursus of Ravenna, 4th-century bishop
- Ursus of Solothurn, 3rd-century martyr
