= Silvanus (name) =

Silvanus is a masculine given name. Notable people and characters with the name include:

== People and biblical figures ==
=== Biblical figures and early Christians ===
- Silas or Silvanus (fl. 1st century AD), an early Christian and companion of Paul
- Silvanus of the Seventy, another early Christian and traditionally among Jesus' seventy apostles
- Saint Silvanus (or Sylvanus), one of seven sons of Saint Felicitas of Rome (2nd century)
- Silvanus of Gaza (hieromartyr) (died c. 311), saint, martyr and bishop of Gaza
- Silvanus of Ahun (died 407), martyr
- Silvanus of Gaza (died before 414), Palestinian Christian monk, one of the Desert Fathers

=== Ancient Roman officials ===
- Silvanus (magister peditum) (died 355), Roman general who revolted against Emperor Constantius II
- Silvanus (praetorian prefect), Roman officer of the third century AD

=== Modern era ===
- Silouan the Athonite (1866–1938), also known as Saint Silvanus the Athonite, Russian Eastern Orthodox monk and saint
- Silvanus Bevan (1691–1765), Welsh apothecary
- Sylvanus Bowser (1854–1938), American inventor credited with inventing the automobile fuel pump
- Sylvanus C. Breyfogel (1851–1934), American bishop of the Evangelical Association
- Sylvanus Dung Dung (born 1949), Indian field hockey player
- Sylvanus William Godon (1809–1879), American naval officer
- Sylvanus Lowry (1824–1865), slave owning Southern aristocrat from Kentucky who reigned as the political boss of Saint Cloud, Minnesota
- Sylvanus Morgan (1620–1693), English arms-painter and author
- Sylvanus Morley (1883–1948), American archaeologist, epigrapher, and Mayanist scholar
- Sylvanus Ngele, Nigerian senator
- Silvanus Njambari (born 1974), Namibian retired footballer
- Sylvanus Okpala (born 1961), Nigerian football midfielder
- Sylvanus Olympio (1902–1963), Togolese politician, Prime Minister and President of Togo
- Silvanus Melea Otieno (1931–1986), posthumously controversial Kenyan lawyer
- Sylvannus Petty, Bahamian politician
- Sylvanus T. Rugg (1834–1881), Union Army officer during the American Civil War
- Sylvanus H. Sweet (1830–1899), American civil engineer, politician and New York State Engineer and Surveyor
- Sylvanus Thayer (1785–1872), American colonel and "Father of the United States Military Academy"
- Silvanus P. Thompson (1851–1916), British physicist, engineer and author
- Sylvanus Trask (1811–1897), American politician
- Silvanus Trevail (1851–1903), Cornish architect
- Sylvanus Percival Vivian (1880–1958), 7th Registrar General of England and Wales
- Sylvanus Wear (1858–1920), English naturalist
- Sylvanus Wood (1604–1675), English politician

== Fictional characters ==
- Silvanus Kettleburn, the former Care of Magical Creatures teacher in the Harry Potter novel series
- Sylvanas Windrunner, in the Warcraft video game series
- Silvanus (Forgotten Realms), a deity in the Forgotten Realms setting of Dungeons & Dragons

== See also ==
- Claudius Silvanus (died 355), Frankish usurper in 355
- Marcus Caeionius Silvanus (born c. 120), Roman consul in 156 AD
- Marcus Plautius Silvanus (consul 2 BC), Roman consul in 2 BC
- Tiberius Plautius Silvanus Aelianus, Roman consul
- Silvano (disambiguation), a given name and surname
