= Sts. Peter and Paul Church (Starocherkasskaya) =

Church building in Starocherkasskaya, Russia

Coordinates: 47.1418°N 40.0212°E

The Church of Saints Peter and Paul
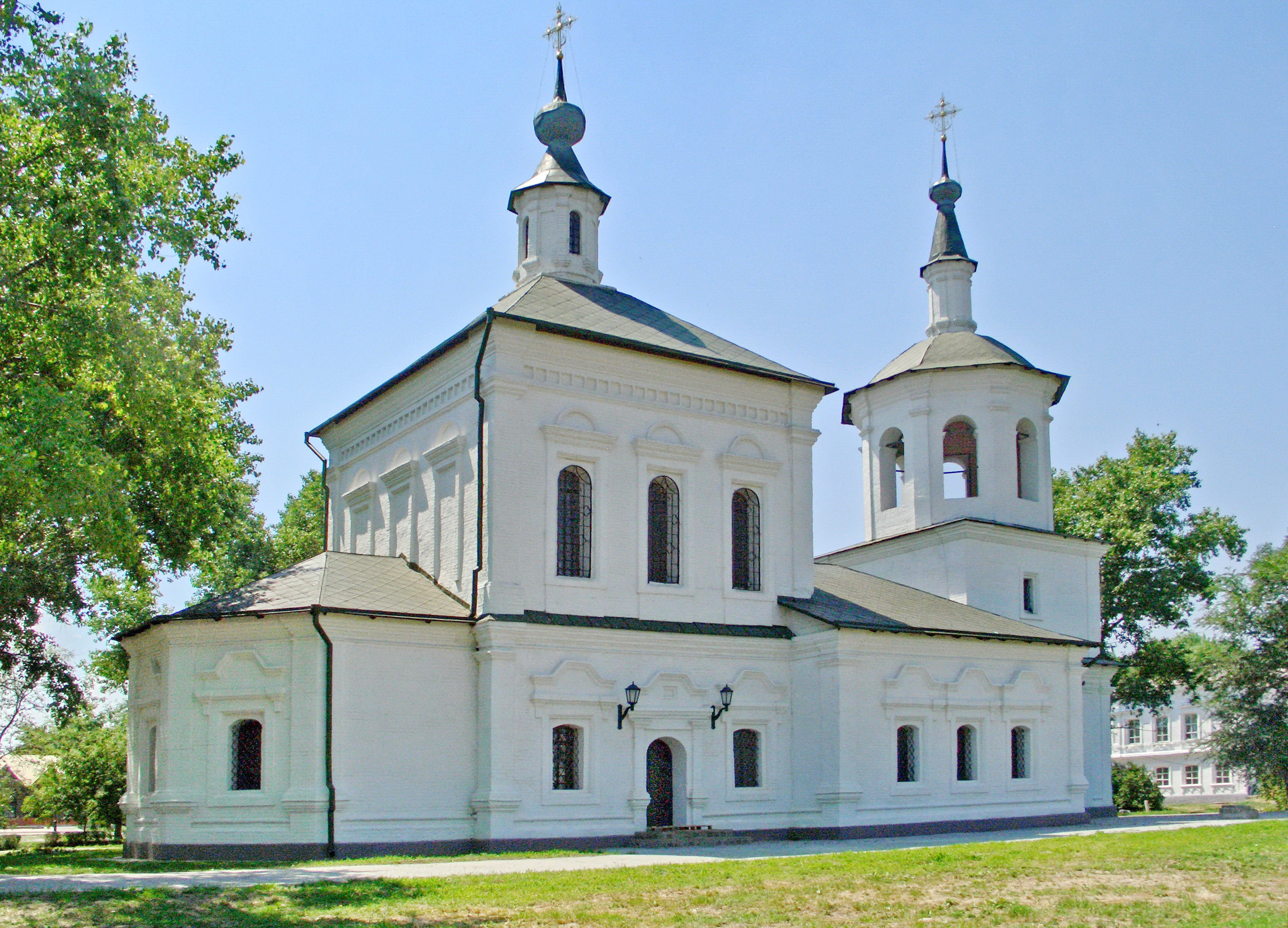

Religion
- Affiliation: Russian Orthodox

Location
- Location: Starocherkasskaya stanitsa, Aksaysky District, Rostov Oblast, Russia
- Interactive map of The Church of Saints Peter and Paul

Architecture
- Completed: 1751

The Church of Saints Peter and Paul (Russian: Церковь святых апостолов Петра и Павла) or the Petropavlovsk Church (Russian: Петропавловская церковь) is a Russian Orthodox church in Starocherkasskaya stanitsa, Aksaysky District, Rostov Oblast, Russia that was built in 1751. It is one of the oldest churches in all of Rostov Oblast.

== History ==
The small wooden Peter and Paul Church in Cherkassk was first mentioned in official documents in 1692. After the city fire in 1744, Empress of Russia Elizabeth I sent ten masons and plasterers for the construction of a new church to the local ataman Danil Efremov in 1749. They quickly finished it. As early as 1751, a Divine Liturgy was held in honor of the opening of the church and its chapel dedicated to Saint John the Warrior.

In the newly consecrated church in the same year, the renowned Ataman Matvey Platov was baptized. In August 2013, a plaque with text was installed on the church wall:

Here in the Church of Sts. Peter and Paul in 1753 was baptized Matvey Platov, Ataman of the Don Army, the hero of the Patriotic War of 1812, and a General of the cavalry.

During the Soviet era, the church was closed and fell into decay. In 1970s, the building was in a deplorable state: there was no dome and side-altars, and the bell tower was completely demolished. Restoration work on the Peter and Paul Church began in 1975, but due to insufficient funding it was stopped. The work was resumed in 2004 with funds allocated by the regional administration. By 2008, most of the renovation work was completed.
