= Selvanus =

Selvanus could be both a masculine given name and a surname. Notable people with this name include:

- Selvanus Geh (born 1993), Indonesian badminton player
- Yulius Selvanus (born 1963), Indonesian politician

== See also ==
- Silvanus (name)
- Silvanus (mythology)
