= Epenetus of Carthage =

Christian saint

Saint Epenetus
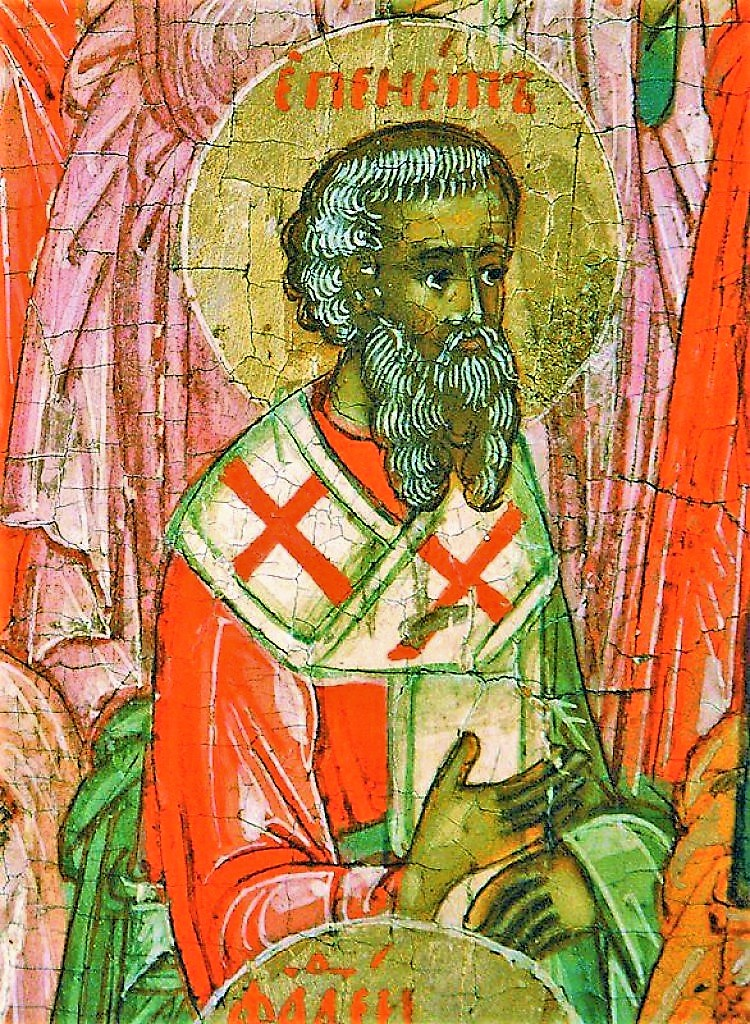
- Died: 64
- Venerated in: Greek Orthodox Church; Roman Catholic Church
- Feast: July 30

Epenetus or Epaenetus (Greek: Ἐπαινετός) is a saint in the Greek Orthodox Church and Roman Catholic Church, considered one of the seventy disciples and may have been the first Bishop of Carthage or Cartagena. In the 16th chapter of St. Paul's letter to the Romans, Epenetus is referred to by Saint Paul as "my beloved" and given the great distinction of being named the "first convert in the Province of Asia".

Epaentus was a convert to Christianity in Ephesus. In the lists of the seventy disciples by the Pseudo-Dorotheus and Pseudo-Hippolytus, Epaenetus figures as Bishop of Carthage or Cartagena. The Greek Orthodox Church remembers Epenetus on January 4 among the Seventy, and on July 30 with Apostles Silas and Silvanus, Crescens, and Andronicus.
