= July 31 (Eastern Orthodox liturgics) =

Day in the Eastern Orthodox liturgical calendar

Eastern Orthodox liturgical calendar
| July 30 | July 31 | August 1 |
July 31 O.S. ≍ August 13 N.S. July 31 N.S ≍ July 18 O.S.

An Eastern Orthodox cross

July 31 in Eastern Orthodox liturgical calendars is a feast day and a day of commemoration of saints and martyrs. Although some Orthodox churches use the Revised Julian Calendar and others use the traditional Julian calendar, the fixed commemorations for their respective July 31 are broadly the same, no matter which calendar is used. (Note: Despite the dates being the same, the days to which they refer typically differ by 13 days. The notation Old Style or O.S. is sometimes used to indicate a date in the traditional Julian Calendar (the "Old Calendar"). The notation New Style or N.S. indicates a date in the Revised Julian calendar (the "New Calendar").)

== Feasts ==
- Forefeast of the Procession of the Precious Wood of the Life-giving Cross of the Lord. (Note: See: (in Russian) Происхождение честных древ Животворящего Креста. Википедии. (Russian Wikipedia).)

== Saints ==
- Righteous Joseph of Arimathea, who buried the Master Christ (1st century)
- Righteous Eudocimus of Cappadocia, Military Commander of Cappadocia (9th century)
- Martyr Julitta (Juliet), at Caesarea in Cappadocia (304-305) (see also: July 30)
- Saint John the Exarch of Bulgaria (c. 917-927)

== Pre-Schism Western saints ==
- Saint Calimerius, a Greek who became Bishop of Milan in Italy, Apostle of the Po Valley (c. 190) (Note: He was martyred under Commodus by being thrown into a well. He is buried under the altar of his church in Milan.) (Note: "At Milan, during the persecution of Antoninus, St. Calimerius, bishop and martyr, who was arrested, covered with wounds, and pierced through the neck with a sword. He terminated his martyrdom by being precipitated into a well.")
- Saint Fabius, a soldier beheaded in Caesarea in Mauretania in North Africa under Diocletian, for refusing to carry a standard bearing idolatrous emblems (300) (Note: "At Caesarea, the martyrdom of the blessed martyr Fabius. As he refused to carry the ensign of the governor of the province, he was thrown into prison for some days, and as he persisted twice in confessing Christ when brought before the judge, he was condemned to capital punishment.")
- Twelve Soldier-Martyrs of Rome, by the sword.
- Saint Firmus of Tagaste, in North Africa, he was tortured and endured terrible sufferings rather than betray the hiding-place of one of his flock. (Note: "At Tagaste, in Africa, St. Firmus, bishop, illustrious by a glorious confession of the faith.")
- Saint Germanus of Auxerre, Bishop of Auxerre in Gaul (448) (Note: Born in Auxerre in France, he governed part of Gaul. In 418 he became Bishop of Auxerre. He came to Britain twice (in 429 and 447), where he succeeded in stamping out Pelagianism. He reposed in Ravenna in Italy.) (Note: "At Ravenna, the departure from this world of St. Germanus, bishop of Auxerre, a man most renowned for his birth, faith, learning, and glorious miracles, who freed England completely from the heretical doctrines of the Pelagians.")
- Saint Neot, Hermit, in Cornwall (c. 877) (Note: According to tradition he was a monk at Glastonbury in England, who became a hermit in Cornwall at the place now called Saint Neot. Some relics were later taken to the town now called St Neots in Cambridgeshire.)

== Post-Schism Orthodox saints ==
- Saint Arsenius, Bishop of Ninotsminda in Georgia (1082)
- Holy anonymous new martyr of Crete, at Alexandria in Egypt (1811)
- New Monk-martyr Dionysius of Vatopedi, Mt. Athos (1822)

=== New martyrs and confessors ===
- New Hieromartyrs, at Petrograd (1922):

- Benjamin (Kazansky), Metropolitan of Petrograd and Gdovsk; (Note: See: (in Russian) Вениамин (Казанский). Википедии. (Russian Wikipedia).)
- Sergius (Shein), Archimandrite; (Note: See: (in Russian) Сергий (Шеин). Википедии. (Russian Wikipedia).)

- New Martyrs, at Petrograd (1922):

- George Novitsky (Note: See: (in Russian) Новицкий, Юрий Петрович. Википедии. (Russian Wikipedia).) and John Kovsharov. (Note: See: (in Russian) Ковшаров, Иван Михайлович. Википедии. (Russian Wikipedia).)

- Martyr Maximus Rumyantsev (1928)
- New New Hieromartyr Vladimir Kholodkovsky, Priest (1937)
- New Hieromartyr John Rumyantsev, Priest; Martyr Constantine Razumov, Priest; Virgin-martyr Anna Serova; (Note: See: (in Russian) Серова, Анна Васильевна. Википедии. (Russian Wikipedia).) and St. Elizabeth Rumyantseva (after 1937)
- New Hieromartyr Nicholas, Priest (1941)
- New Hiero-confessor Basil (Preobrazhensky), Bishop of Kineshma (1945) (Note: See: (in Russian) Василий (Преображенский, Вениамин Сергеевич). Википедии. (Russian Wikipedia).)

== Other commemorations ==
- Consecration of the Church of the Most Holy Theotokos of Blachernae.
- Translation of the relics of Apostle Philip to Cyprus.
- Repose of Elder Gerasim the Younger, of the St. Sergius Skete, Kaluga (1918)

== Icon gallery ==
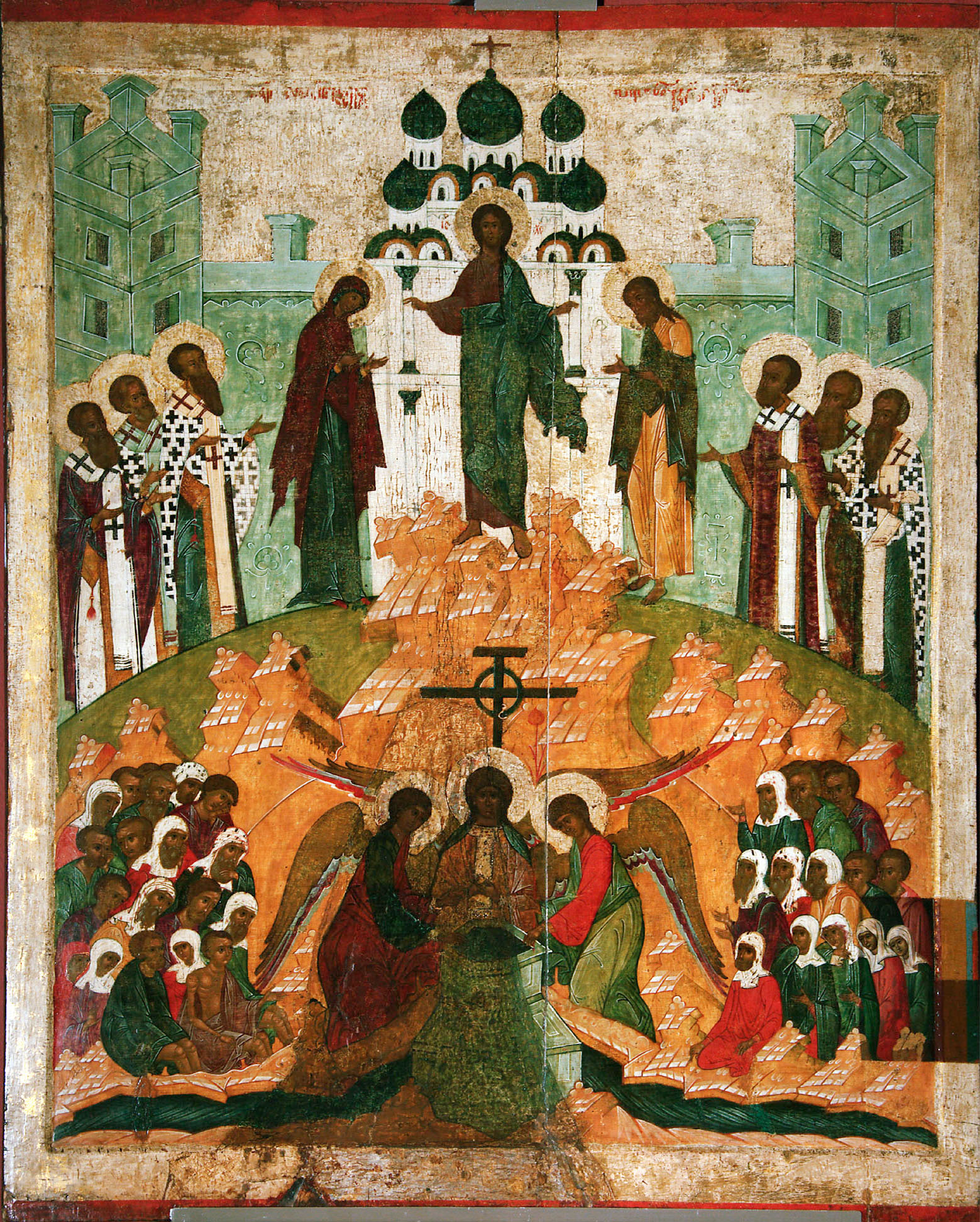
Procession of the Precious Wood of the Life-giving Cross of the Lord.

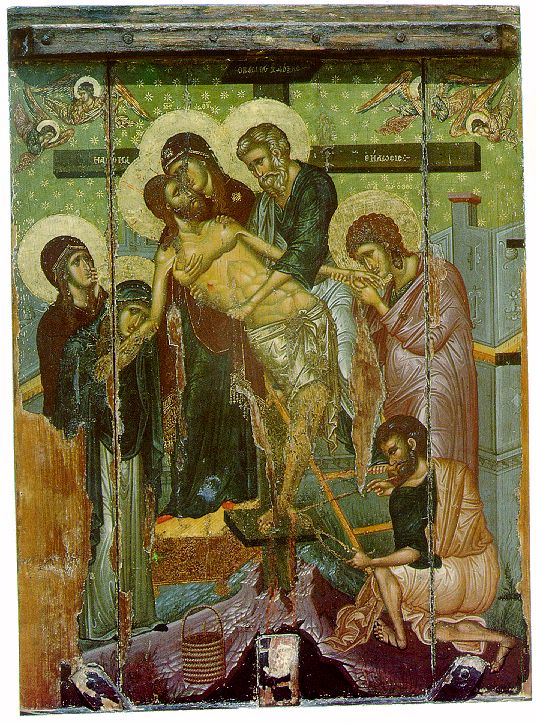
Icon of the Descent from the Cross, including Righteous Joseph of Arimathea.

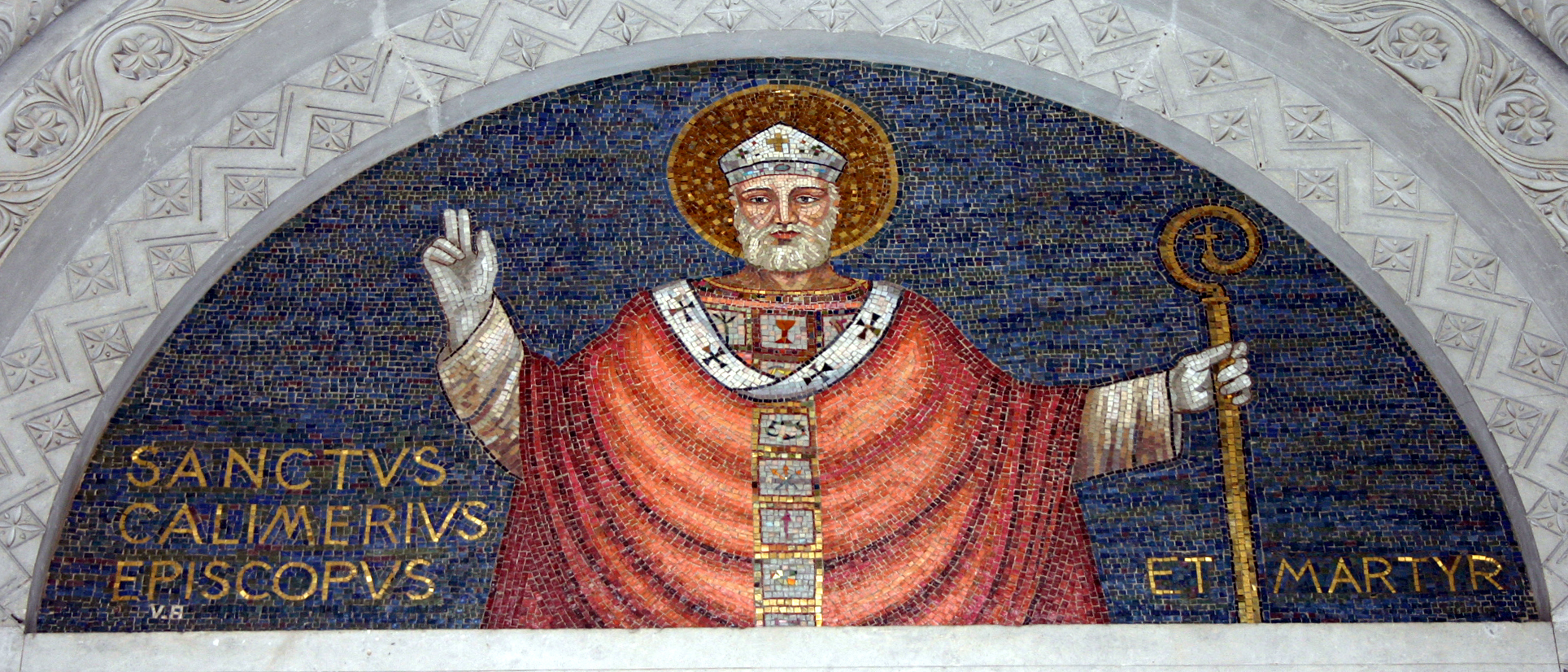
Fresco of St. Calimerius, Bishop of Milan (19th c.).

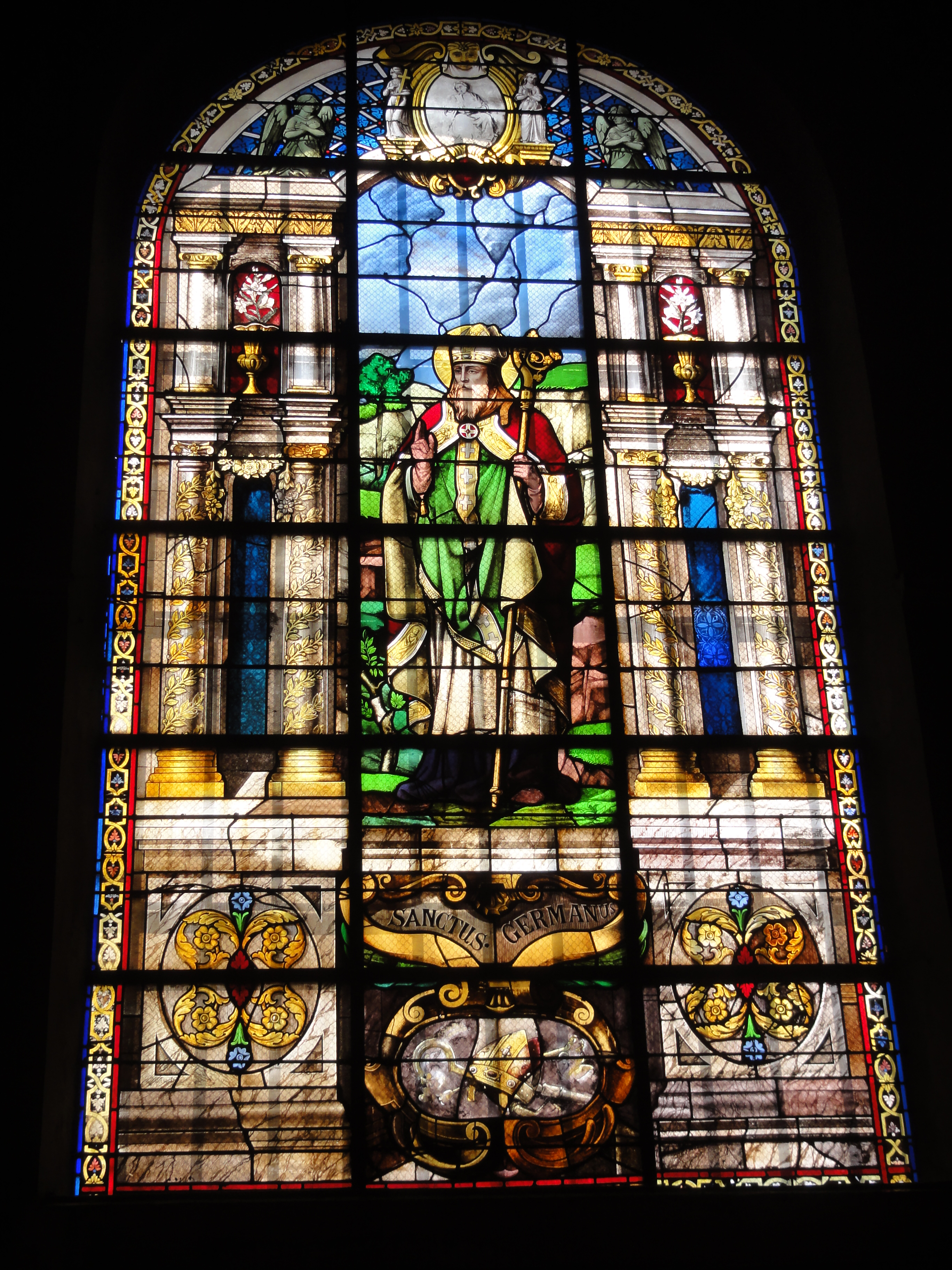
St. Germanus of Auxerre.

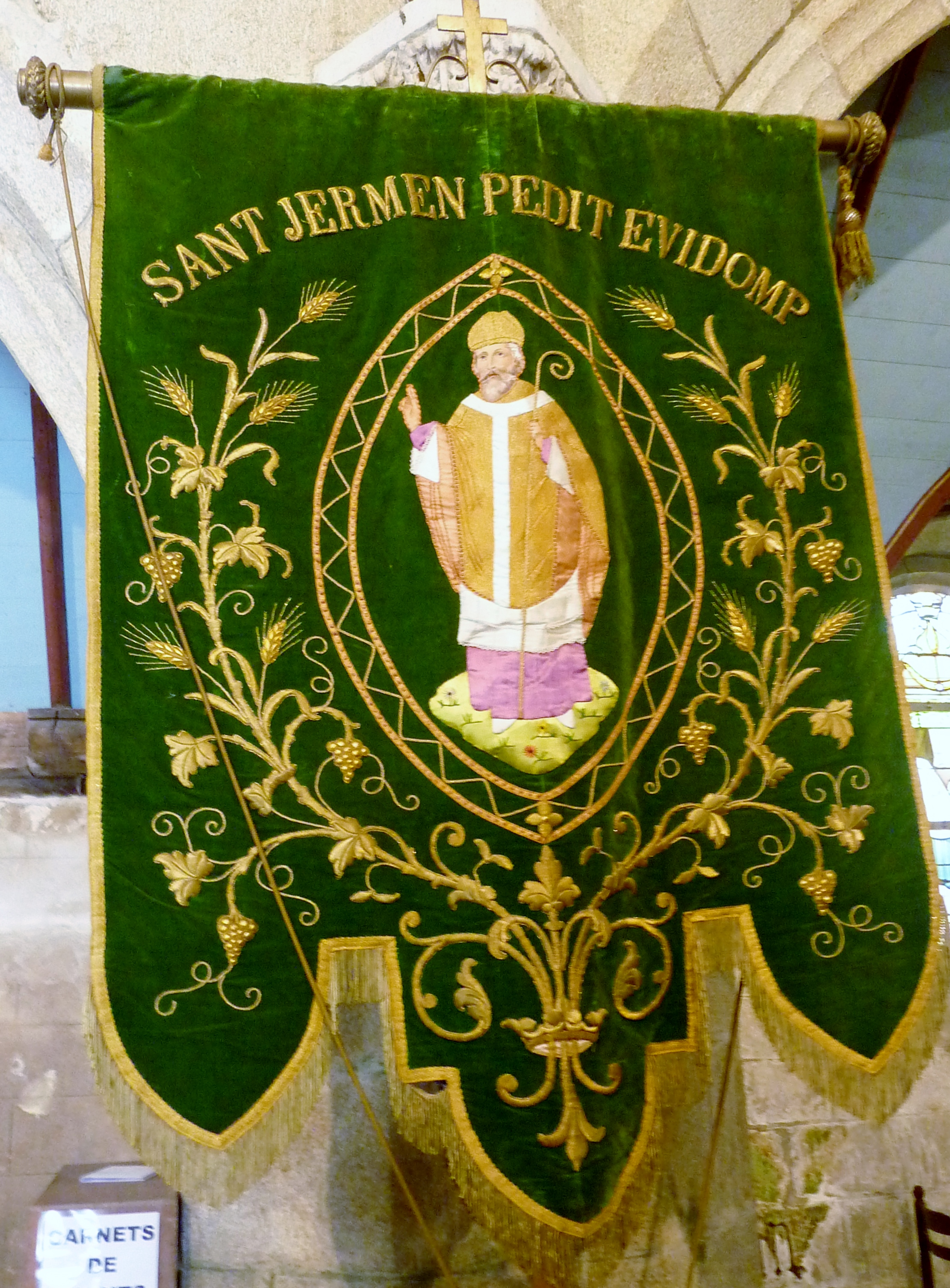
A processional banner of St. Germanus of Auxerre.

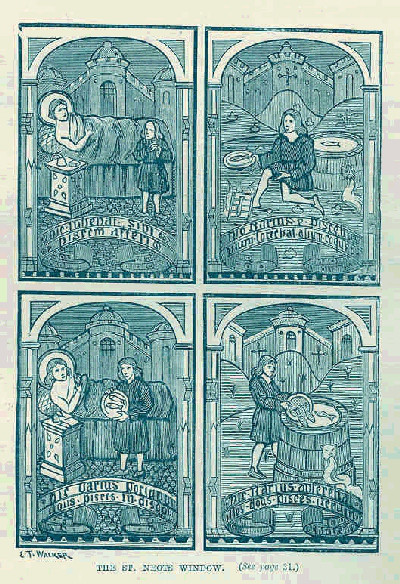
Stained glass window at St Neot, Cornwall, illustrating the miracle of the fishes associated with St Neot.

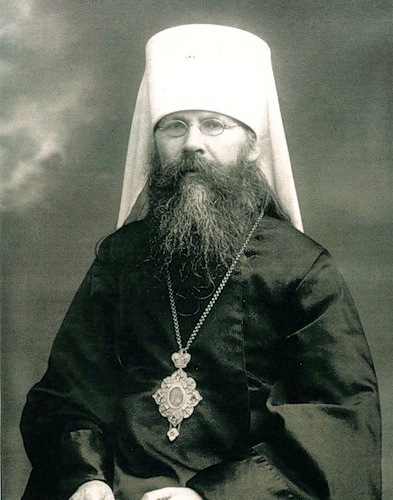
New Hieromartyr Benjamin (Kazansky), Metropolitan of Petrograd and Gdovsk.

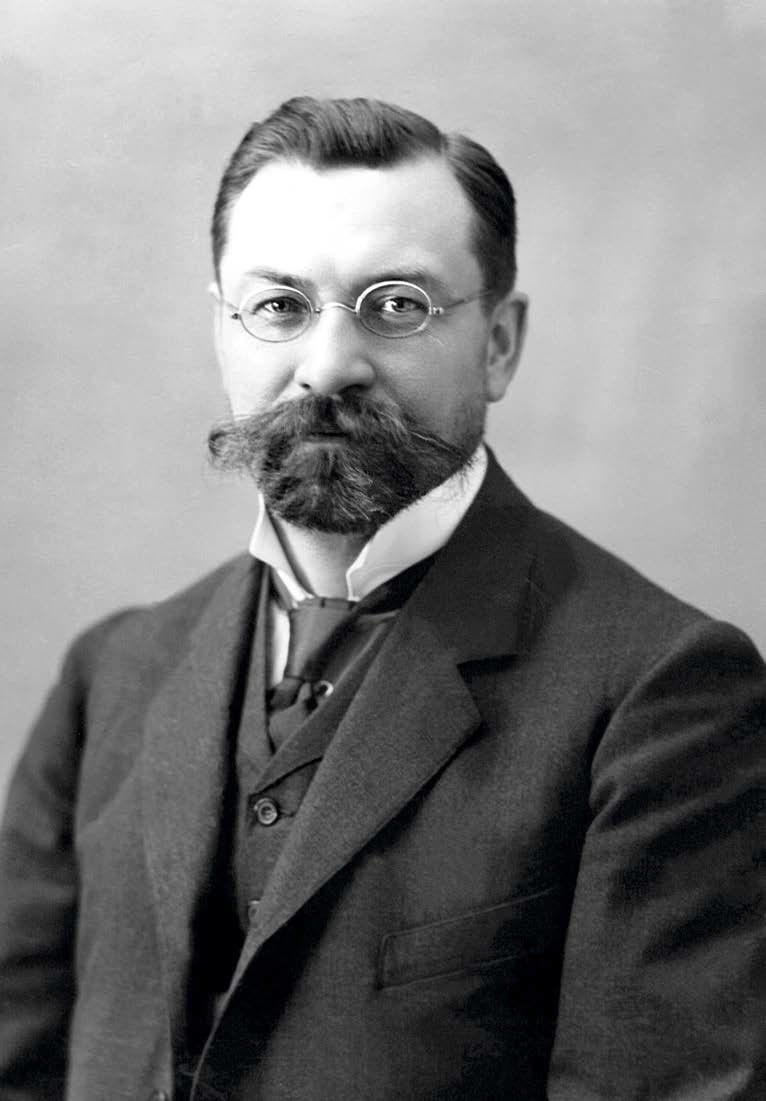
New Hieromartyr Sergius (Shein), Archimandrite.

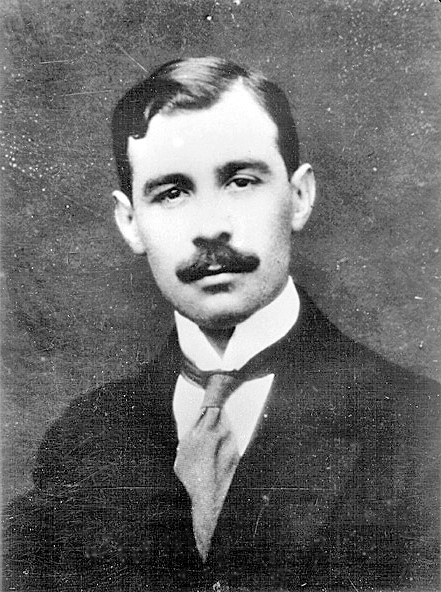
New Martyr George Novitsky.

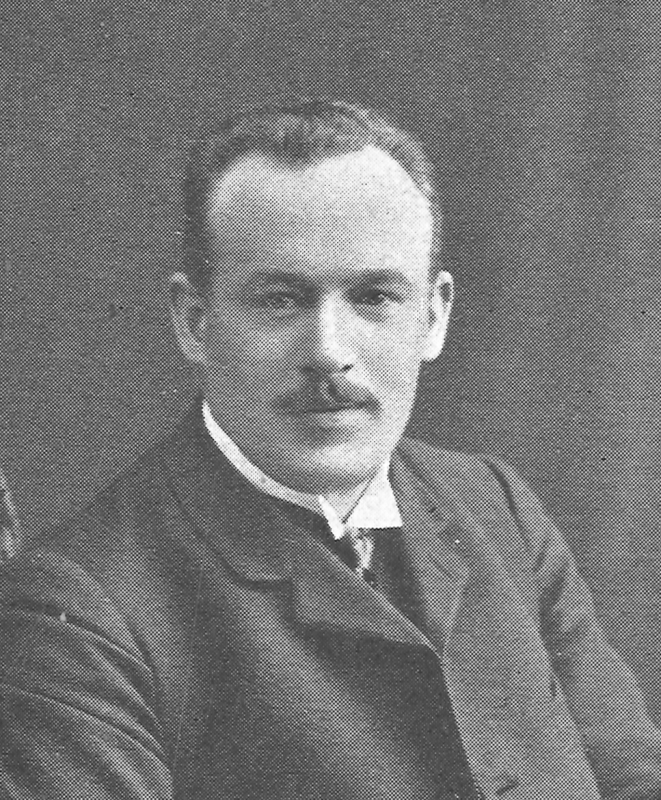
New Martyr John Kovsharov.

== Sources ==
- July 31/August 13. Orthodox Calendar (pravoslavie.ru).
- August 13 / July 31. Holy Trinity Russian Orthodox Church (a parish of the Patriarchate of Moscow).
- July 31. OCA - The Lives of the Saints.
- July 31. The Year of Our Salvation - Holy Transfiguration Monastery, Brookline, Massachusetts.
- The Autonomous Orthodox Metropolia of Western Europe and the Americas (ROCOR). St. Hilarion Calendar of Saints for the year of our Lord 2004. St. Hilarion Press (Austin, TX). p. 56.
- The Thirty-First Day of the Month of July. Orthodoxy in China.
- July 31. Latin Saints of the Orthodox Patriarchate of Rome.
- The Roman Martyrology. Transl. by the Archbishop of Baltimore. Last Edition, According to the Copy Printed at Rome in 1914. Revised Edition, with the Imprimatur of His Eminence Cardinal Gibbons. Baltimore: John Murphy Company, 1916. p. 227.
- Rev. Richard Stanton. A Menology of England and Wales, or, Brief Memorials of the Ancient British and English Saints Arranged According to the Calendar, Together with the Martyrs of the 16th and 17th Centuries. London: Burns & Oates, 1892. pp. 371–374.

=== Greek Sources ===
- Great Synaxaristes: (in Greek) 31 ΙΟΥΛΙΟΥ. ΜΕΓΑΣ ΣΥΝΑΞΑΡΙΣΤΗΣ.
- (in Greek) Συναξαριστής. 31 Ιουλίου. ecclesia.gr. (H ΕΚΚΛΗΣΙΑ ΤΗΣ ΕΛΛΑΔΟΣ).
- (in Greek) 31/07/2026. Ορθόδοξος Συναξαριστής.

=== Russian Sources ===
- (in Russian) 13 августа (31 июля). Православная Энциклопедия под редакцией Патриарха Московского и всея Руси Кирилла (электронная версия). (Orthodox Encyclopedia - Pravenc.ru).
- (in Russian) 31 июля по старому стилю / 13 августа по новому стилю. СПЖ "Союз православных журналистов". 2026.
