= Silas =

1st century AD Christian saint and bishop

Saint Silas
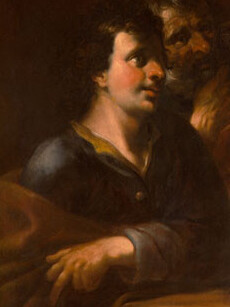
- Detail from Michael Václav Halbax: Saint Paul and Silas in Prison by Michael Václav Halbax, c. 1700

Apostle, Disciple, Missionary, Bishop, and Martyr
- Died: 65–100 AD; Macedonia
- Venerated in: Roman Catholic Church; Eastern Catholic Churches; Eastern Orthodoxy; Oriental Orthodox; Anglicanism; Lutheranism
- Feast: January 26 (Evangelical Lutheran Church in America, Episcopal Church); February 10 (Lutheran Church–Missouri Synod); July 13 (Roman Martyrology); July 30 (Eastern Orthodoxy); July 13 (Syriac, Malankara Calendars)
- Attributes: Christian Martyrdom

Silas or Silvanus (/ˈsaɪləs/; Greek: Σίλας/Σιλουανός; fl. 1st century AD) was a leading member of the Early Christian community, who according to the New Testament accompanied Paul the Apostle on his second missionary journey.

== Name and etymologies ==
Silas is traditionally assumed to be the same as the Silvanus mentioned in four epistles. Some translations, including the New International Version, call him "Silas" in the epistles. Paul, Silas, and Timothy are listed as co-authors of the two New Testament letters to the Thessalonians, though the authorship is disputed. The Second Epistle to the Corinthians mentions Silas as having preached with Paul and Timothy to the church in Corinth (1:19), and the First Epistle of Peter describes Silas as a "faithful brother" (5:12).

There is some disagreement over the original or "proper" form of his name: "Silas", "Silvanus", "Seila", and "Saul" seem to be treated at the time as equivalent versions of the same name in different languages, and it is not clear which is the original name of "Silas", and which is a translation or equivalent nickname, or whether some references are to different persons with equivalent names. He is consistently called "Silas" in the Acts of the Apostles, but the Roman name Silvanus (which means "of the forest") is always used by Paul and in the First Epistle of Peter (5:12); it may be that "Silvanus" is the Romanized version of the original "Silas", or that "Silas" is the Greek nickname for "Silvanus". Silas is thus often identified with Silvanus of the Seventy. Catholic theologian Joseph Fitzmyer further points out that Silas is the Greek rendition of the Aramaic Seila (שְׁאִילָא), a version of the Hebrew Saul (שָׁאוּל), which is attested in Palmyrene inscriptions.

== Biblical narrative ==
Silas is first mentioned in Acts 15:22, where he and Judas Barsabbas (known often as 'Judas') were selected by the church elders to return with Paul and Barnabas to Antioch following the Jerusalem Council. Silas and Judas are mentioned as being leaders among the brothers, prophets and encouraging speakers. Silas was selected by Paul to accompany him on his second mission after Paul and Barnabas split over an argument involving Mark's participation. It was during the second mission that he and Paul were imprisoned briefly in Philippi, where an earthquake broke their chains and opened the prison door. Silas is thus sometimes depicted in art carrying broken chains. Acts 16:25-37.

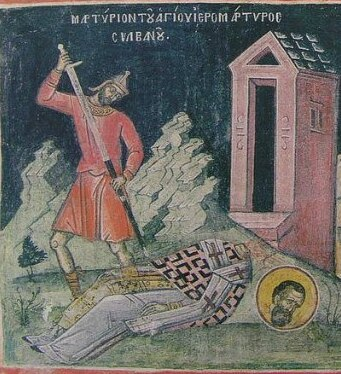
Fresco from Dionysiou Monastery

According to Acts 17–18, Silas and Timothy travelled with Paul from Philippi to Thessalonica, where they were treated with hostility in the synagogues. The harassers followed the trio to Berea, threatening Paul's safety, and causing Paul to separate from Silas and Timothy. Paul travelled to Athens, and Silas and Timothy later joined him in Corinth.

These events can be dated to around AD 50: the reference in Acts 18:12 to the Proconsul Gallio helps ascertain this date (cf. Gallio inscription). According to Acts 18:6–7, Paul ceased to attend the synagogue in Corinth as a result of hostility; Silas is not mentioned thereafter in the Acts narrative.

He appears in the salutation of 1 and 2 Thessalonians, and is referred to in 2 Corinthians 1:19. This is as expected, as we read of his involvement in Paul's mission when these cities were visited. He also appears in the conclusion of 1 Peter at 5:12, and is perhaps the amanuensis. Peter says he regards Silas as "a faithful brother".

== Mysticism ==
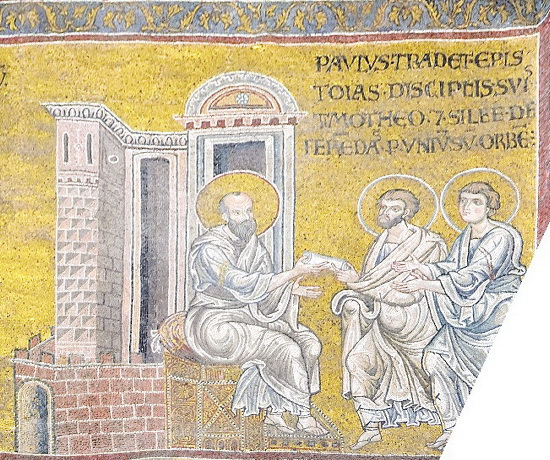
Paul entrusts letters to Timothy and Silas. 12th-century mosaic in Cathedral (Monreale).

Anne Catherine Emmerich recounts in her visions that Silas' original name was Sela, and that he was one of the three "secret disciples," along with Hermas, who had later accompanied Jesus on his trip to the Three Kings' homeland near Ur, and thence to Heliopolis, and whose parents had come with the caravan of the Three Kings.

== Veneration ==
Saint Silas is celebrated in the Calendar of Saints of the Evangelical Lutheran Church in America and that of the Episcopal Church (United States) with a Lesser Feast on January 26 with Timothy and Titus, and separately on July 13 by the Roman Catholic Church and February 10 by the Lutheran Church–Missouri Synod. Saint Silas is also venerated by the Eastern Orthodox Church on July 30 along with the Apostles Silvanus, Crescens, Epenetus, and Andronicus and on January 4 where he is venerated with all the apostles.

== See also ==
- Agabus
- Barnabas
- Manahen
- Churches named after St. Silas
- Teachings of Silvanus: an apocryphal text from the Nag Hammadi Library that is attributed to Silas.
