= Crescens =

Figure in New Testament

Saint Crescens
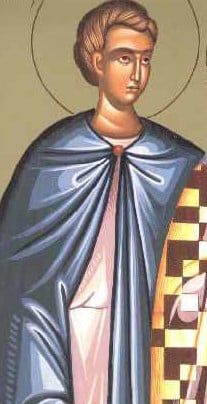
- Icon of the Apostle Crescens (center), with Apostles Silvanus and Silas of the Seventy

Hieromartyr Apostle of the Seventy
- Born: 1st century
- Died: c. 98–117; Galatia, Roman Empire (modern-day Central Anatolia, Turkey)
- Venerated in: Eastern Orthodox Church; Roman Catholic Church
- Feast: 30 July (Orthodoxy); 27 June (Catholicism)

Crescens (Greek: Κρήσκης) was an individual who appears in the New Testament. He is traditionally considered one of the 72 disciples sent out by Jesus in Luke 10. He was a missionary in Galatia and became a companion of Paul. The name 'Crescens' is the present-active participle of the Latin word crescere, and means 'increasing'.

== Biblical narrative ==
Crescens, a companion of Paul during his second Roman captivity, appears once in the New Testament, where he is mentioned as having left the Apostle to go into Galatia: "Make haste to come to me quickly", Paul writes to Timothy, "for Demas hath left me, loving this world, and is gone to Thessalonica, Crescens into Galatia, Titus into Dalmatia" (2 Timothy 4:8–10). All commentators agree in ranking Crescens with Titus rather than with Demas, and in seeing here, therefore, a reference to a missionary journey into Galatia. This term, in New Testament times, might mean either Gaul or the Roman province of Galatia in Asia Minor, where Paul had laboured so much; and its use here has been interpreted in both senses. In the other passages where it occurs in the New Testament, however, it denotes Galatia, and most probably it would be so understood here by Timothy, especially as the other regions mentioned are likewise to the east of Rome. Moreover, Paul might easily have a reason for sending a disciple to visit his old Churches in Galatia, while Fenlon notes that there is no proof that he had an active interest in Gaul.

== Early church tradition ==
Accordingly, the earliest tradition (Apostolic Constitutions, VII, 46) represents Crescens as a bishop of the Churches in Galatia, martyred there during the reign of Trajan.

Later traditions, on the other hand, locate him as Bishop of Vienne in Gaul, also at Mainz on the Rhine. But the earliest known traditions of Gaul itself record nothing of this disciple of the Apostle as a founder of their Churches, and the belief is thought to have arisen later from the desire of an Apostolic origin. The claims of Vienne have been most strongly urged; but they are based upon the mistaken identification of its first bishop, Crescens, who lived in the third century, with the disciple of Paul. As little can be said for Mainz. The reading of certain manuscripts (Sinaiticus, Ephræmi), which have "Gallia" instead of "Galatia", has also been advanced in favour of Gaul; but the traditional reading is supported by the great mass of manuscript evidence. Crescens is mentioned as one of the Seventy Apostles of Christ by Pseudo-Dorotheus. His martyrdom in Galatia, under Trajan, commemorated on 27 June by the Roman Martyrology, lacks the confirmation of older Martyrologies.

== Veneration ==
The Eastern Orthodox Church honours him on 30 July, as one of the Seventy.

== Sources ==
- Herbermann, Charles, ed. (1913). "Crescens" . Catholic Encyclopedia. New York: Robert Appleton Company.
- Car Démas m'a abandonné par amour du monde présent. Il est parti pour Thessalonique, Crescens pour la Galatie, Tite pour la Dalmatie.
- Recherche sur les églises de Reims, de Soissons et de Chalons - L.W Ravenez - 1857.
