= St Silas Church =

St Silas Church may refer to:

- St Silas' Church, Blackburn
- St Silas Church, Glasgow
- St Silas Church, Kentish Town
- St Silas Church, Sheffield
- St Silas' Church, Lozells
