= Sylvanus Wear =

British naturalist

Sylvanus Wear (1858–1920) was a British naturalist who settled in Belfast in 1904.

Sylvanus Wear formed the core of the Belfast Field Club. The flowering plants were his hobby and he undertook the work required to issue a Second Supplement and Summary of the Flora of the North-east of Ireland. He was born in Felton, Northumberland and retired to live in Belfast. His algal collections were donated by Queen's University of Belfast to the Ulster Museum in 1968. His algal collection, made between 1915 and 1917, has now been amalgamated into the main algal herbarium preserved as one entity by the system of marking with a collection number, in this case "C.12". Obituary (1921): Irish Naturalists'. Journal 30.

== S.Wear's publications ==
Wear, S.1923. A second supplement to and summary of Stewart & Corry's Flora of the north-east of Ireland. Belfast.
