= Ursus of Auxerre =

Bishop of Auxerre (died 508)

Saint Ursus of Auxerre

Bishop of Auxerre, Hermit
- Born: c. 427
- Residence: Church of St. Amator
- Died: 508
- Honored in: Eastern Orthodox Church; Roman Catholic church
- Feast: 30 July
- Attributes: episcopal attire
- Patronage: Auxerre, France

Saint Ursus of Auxerre (French: Saint-Ours d'Auxerre, born c. 427 AD — died 508 AD) was Bishop of Auxerre from c. 502 until his repose in 508. He is venerated as a saint in the Eastern Orthodox Church and Roman Catholic church, with his feast day being commemorated on 30 July.

== Biography ==
Ursus was presumably born around 427 AD.

He had been a hermit at the church of Saint Amator before being elected bishop at the age of 75 around 502. It is said he was elected after he had saved the town from a fire by his prayers. He died when he was 81 in 508.
