= John the Warrior =

Christian saint

Saint John the Warrior
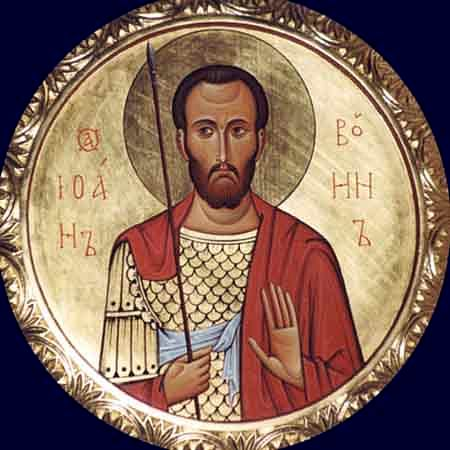

Martyr
- Born: 4th century
- Venerated in: Eastern Orthodox, Catholic Church
- Major shrine: According to legend somewhere in Constantinople (modern-day Istanbul, Turkey)
- Feast: 30 July (Julian); 12 August (Gregorian)

John the Warrior (Greek: Ἰωάννης ὁ στρατιώτης, Russian: Иоанн Воин, Ioann Voin) or John the Soldier in the Catholic Church is a Christian saint and martyr. He was born in the 4th century and lived until his death in the Byzantine Empire. Forced by Julian the Apostate to serve as a warrior against Christianity, he was imprisoned after being caught helping people in need or defending Christians, and awaited there his death penalty. However, John the Warrior was released after the death of the emperor during a war.

The Warrior is always depicted as having dark hair and a beard, as well as wearing a weskit, trousers, boots, scale armour and a cape. Three symbols characterizes him; cross, spear and shield.

== Biography ==
During the reign of Roman emperor Julian the Apostate in the last era of persecution towards Christians in the Roman Empire, John the Warrior served as a soldier in the army, and was forced by Julian to participate on Christian persecutions. However, as a Christian he warned other against attacks or possible imprisonments, and he sometimes visited prisoners. John was not only good towards Christians, but also towards the poor and people in need. He visited invalids and comforted the suffering. When Julian saw John supporting the Christians, he imprisoned him, where the warrior awaited his death penalty. However, in 363 AD Julian died during the Battle of Samarra, and subsequently John was released from the prison.

The exact date of death is unknown, but it is known that he died of very old age. According to a legend, he ordered the place of his funeral and subsequently a devout woman appeared. His relics were preserved in a church in Constantinople dedicated to John the Apostle. It is believed that his relics perform miracles. Believers ask the Saint for intercession and solace for casualties and bereaved people.

== Veneration ==
In the Russian Orthodox tradition, John the Warrior is regarded a helper in sorrow and poverty. Veneration was more common in Little Russia. According to Legends of the Saints (Сказании о святых), the saint was required to pray a special prayer to reobtain stolen things and escaped servants. In the prologs about the Warrior it is said that he "better prevents servants from fleeing, warns about theft and makes evident revelation". There is an icon in the Saint Sophia Cathedral in Kyiv depicting John the Warrior with prayers and kontaktions to the saint. The first verses are,

"О великий заступниче и угодниче Христов Иоанне Воинственниче! Помилуй раба твоего, сущаго в бедах, и скорбех, и во всякой злой напасти, и сохрани от всякаго зла, заступи от обидящаго человека. Тебе бо дана бысть таковая благодать от Бога".
"O mighty intercessor and saint of Christ, John the Warrior! Have mercy upon thy servant who suffers misfortunes, affliction, and all types of adversity. Save him from all evil and protect him from offenders, for thou hast been granted such grace from God".

Next is written:

"О великий и всемилостивый страдальче Иоанне, дивный и страшный, небеснаго Царя воине! Приими моление от раба твоего и от настоящия бедя, от лукаваго человека, от злаго хищения и будущего мучения избави мя, верно вопиюща Ти аллилуйя".
"O mighty and all-gracious martyr John, glorious and terrifying, warrior of the Heavenly King. Accept the supplication of thy servant and from present misfortunes, from those who plot, from evil plunder and from ordeals yet to be, deliver me who cry faithfully unto to thee Hallelujah".

Also, people imprisoned in dungeons or jails pray for John the Warrior.

In The Roman Catholic Church tradition, he is called John the Soldier with his feast day celebrated on July 29.

== Troparion ==
A troparion is a short hymn of one stanza, or one of a series of stanzas.

Всеблагаго Бога и Царя
благоверный раб и воин явился еси,
Иоанне чудодетелю,
пострадав бо ради веры мужески,
блаженне же скончав течение,
зриши Всетворца Господа в небесех светлейше.
От Негоже прием дарование чудес,
страждущим человеком во всяких напастех помогаеши,
укрепляеши воины в ратех,
от врагов пленения,
ран же и внезапных смертей
и от бед лютых изымаеши.
Темже моли Владыку Христа, приснопамятне,
да во всяком обстоянии сотворит нам милость,
и не введет нас во искушения,
но спасет души наша, яко Человеколюбец.

O miracle-worker John,
thou hast been shown to be a truly faithful servant and soldier of God, the all-good Sovereign;
for, having suffered, in manly fashion,
for the Faith and finished thy course in benediction,
in the heavens thou dost behold the Lord and Creator of all most splendidly,
and helpest men who suffer amid all manner of trials.
Thou dost strengthen soldiers in battle,
rescuing them from capture by the enemy,
from wounds, sudden death and cruel misfortunes.
Wherefore, entreat Christ the Master,
O ever-memorable one,
that He deal mercifully with us in every circumstance,
that He lead us not into temptations,
but save our souls, for He is a lover of mankind.

Orthodox icons depicting John the Warrior
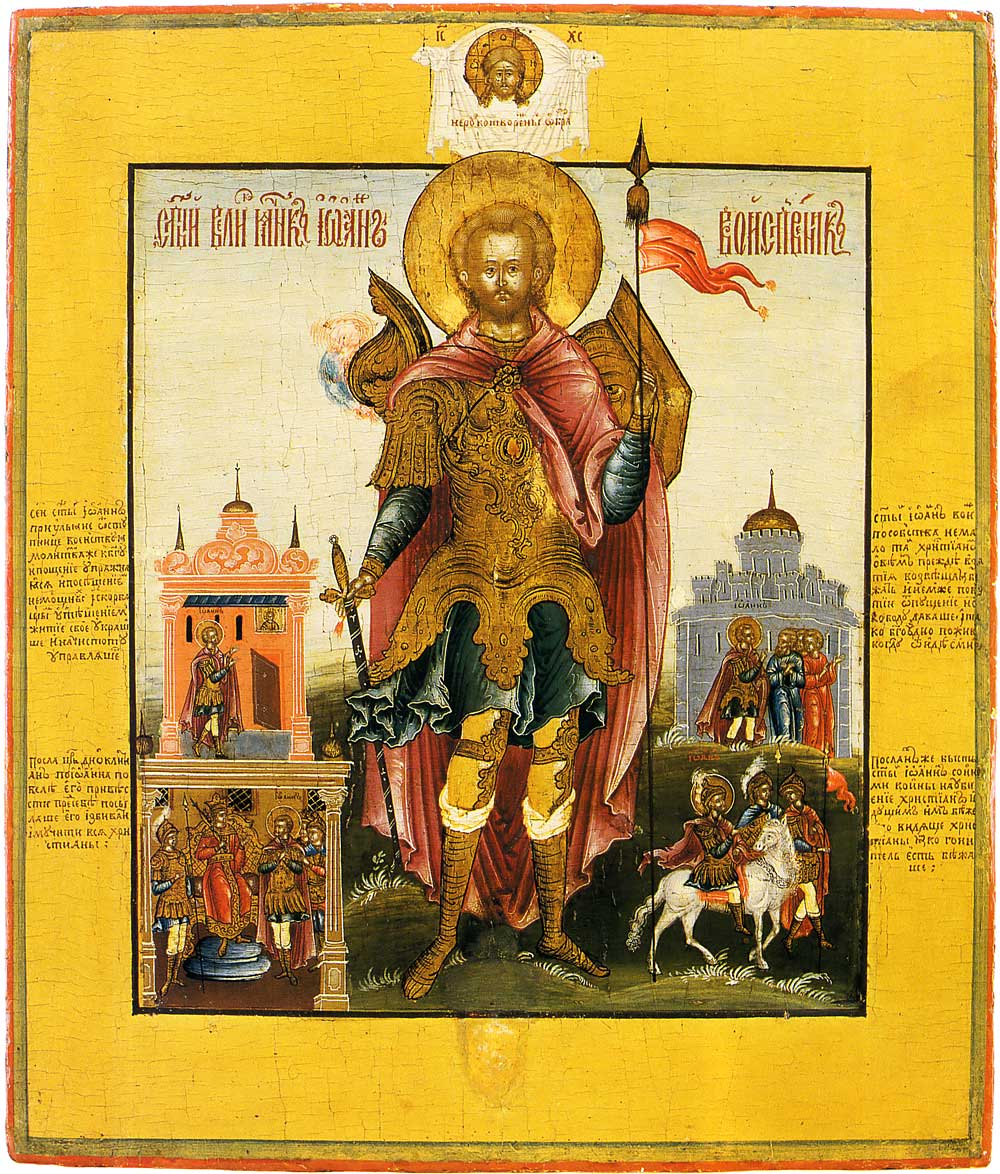
Иоанн Воинственник (Ioann Voistvennik); unknown artist (possibly made by members of the school); Palekh; early 19th century; on wood, primer, egg tempera, gold; 31.5×26.5; State Palekh Art Museum, Palekh, Russia; January 322

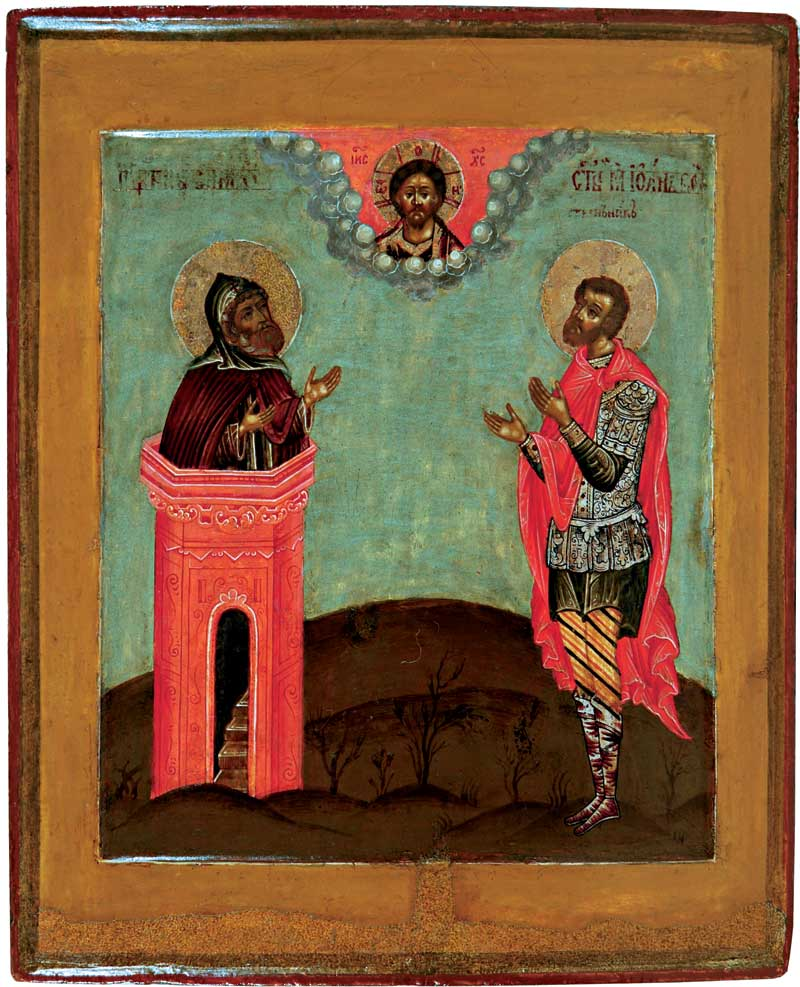
Преподобный Симеон Столпник и мученик Иоанн Воин (Prepodobnij Simeon Stolpnik i muchenik Ioann Voin); from the Simeon Stolpnik church in Yaroslavl; late-17th century – early 18th century; on wood, tempera; 31.5×27; Yaroslavl Art Museum, Yaroslavl, Russia; Инв. И-501; Restoration in 2005 by А. Н. Klyachina

== Iconography ==
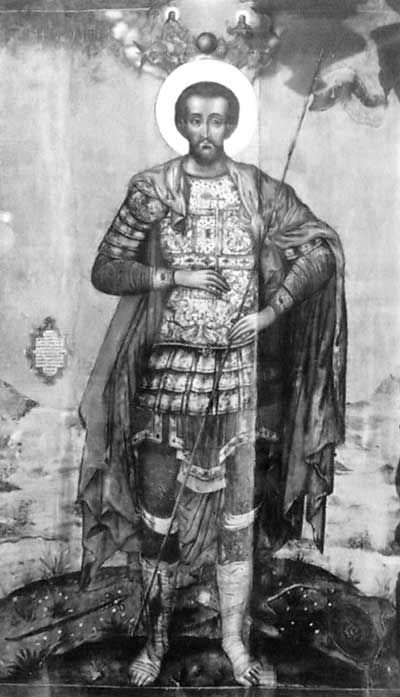

John the Warrior is usually depicted with an uncovered head. His face is framed by dark hair and a beard. He wears an weskit, trousers, boots, scale armour (suggesting he was a horseman) and a cape. The three major attributes of John the Warrior are the cross (symbolizes his faith; defended by all available means), spear (strength; given by God in the name of the war against sin and unfaith) and shield (God's protection from all misfortunes).

The feast day is on 30 July (Julian calendar), or 12 August (Gregorian calendar).
