= Silvanus of the Seventy =

Figure in Eastern Orthodox Christianity

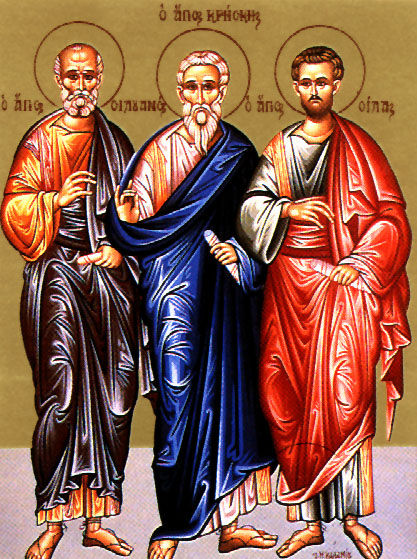
Icon of Apostle Silvanus (left), with Crescens and Silas of the Seventy.

Silvanus (Greek: Σιλουανός) is a traditional figure in Eastern Orthodox tradition assumed to be one of the Seventy Apostles, those followers of Jesus sent out by him in Luke 10. Peter makes mention of him in his first epistle (1 Peter 5:12).

According to Orthodox tradition, he later became Bishop of Thessalonica and died a martyr.

He is to be distinguished from the Silvanus, better known as Silas, who is mentioned in the New Testament (Acts, various letters of Paul, and 1 Peter) as a co-writer or transcriber of some of these works.
