= April 28 =

April 28 this year in various calendars
- Tuesday, 28 April 2026
Akan	Monobene
Armenian	12 Mareri 1475
Aztec	Xocotlhuetzi 8, 5 Cōzcacuāuhtli
Babylonian	10 Nisanu, 2337 SE
Balinese pawukon	Luang, Pepet, Kajeng, Menala, Keliwon, Maulu, Anggara of Kulantir, Uma, Gigis, Pati
Bengali	15 Boisakh, BS 1433
Chinese	Yang Water Monkey・Wings Mansion; Fire Horse Year, Month 3, Day 12 (Guyu, 7 days until Lixia)
Common Era	28 April 2026 CE
Coptic	20 Parmouti, AM 1742
Egyptian	12 Thoth, 2775 NE
Ethiopian	20 Miyāzyā, 2018 Amätä Məhrät
French Republican	Décade I, Nonidi de Floréal de l'Année 234 de la République
Gregorian	28 April, AD 2026
Hebrew	11 Iyar, AM 5786; Omer 26
Hindu	Uttaraphalgunī・Vyāghāta; Solar: 15 Vaiśākha, 1948 SE; Lunisolar: Dvādaśī, Śukla pakṣa of Vaiśākha, 2083 VE; Rāudra・5127 KY・1,872,693
Icelandic	Þriðjudagur, 6 Harpa 2026
Islamic	11 Dhu al-Qi'dah, AH 1447 (using tabular method)
ISO week date	2026-W18-2
Japanese	12 Yayoi, Reiwa 8 (Kokuu, 7 days until Rikka)
Julian	15 April, AD 2026 (AM 7534)
Julian day	2461159
Korean	12 Yongdal, 4359 DE
Maya	13.0.13.9.16; 9 Uo, 5 Cib
Roman	ante diem XVII Kalendas Maias, MMDCCLXXIX AUC
Solar Hijri	8 Ordibehesht, SH 1405
Tibetan	12 nag pa, me pho rta 2153 or 1772 or 1000

<<	April					>>
Su	Mo	Tu	We	Th	Fr	Sa
			1	2	3	4
5	6	7	8	9	10	11
12	13	14	15	16	17	18
19	20	21	22	23	24	25
26	27	28	29	30
2026

April 28 in recent years
2026 (Tuesday)
2025 (Monday)
2024 (Sunday)
2023 (Friday)
2022 (Thursday)
2021 (Wednesday)
2020 (Tuesday)
2019 (Sunday)
2018 (Saturday)
2017 (Friday)

April 28 is the 118th day of the year (119th in leap years) in the Gregorian calendar; 247 days remain until the end of the year.

== Events ==
=== Pre-1600 ===
- 224 – The Battle of Hormozdgan is fought. Ardashir I defeats and kills Artabanus V, effectively ending the Parthian Empire.
- 357 – Emperor Constantius II enters Rome for the first time to celebrate his victory over Magnus Magnentius.
- 1192 – Assassination of Conrad of Montferrat (Conrad I), King of Jerusalem, in Tyre, two days after his title to the throne is confirmed by election. The killing is carried out by Hashshashin.
- 1253 – Nichiren, a Japanese Buddhist monk, propounds Namu Myōhō Renge Kyō for the first time and declares it to be the essence of Buddhism, in effect founding Nichiren Buddhism.
- 1294 – Temür, grandson of Kublai, is elected Khagan of the Mongols with the reigning title Oljeitu.
- 1503 – The Battle of Cerignola is fought. It is noted as one of the first European battles in history won by small arms fire using gunpowder.

=== 1601–1900 ===
- 1611 – Establishment of the Pontifical and Royal University of Santo Tomas, the Catholic University of the Philippines and the largest Catholic university in the world.
- 1625 – A combined Spanish and Portuguese fleet of 52 ships commences the recapture of Bahia from the Dutch during the Dutch–Portuguese War.
- 1738 – Pope Clement XII issues the first papal condemnation of Freemasonry and formally prohibits Catholics from becoming Freemasons.
- 1758 – The Marathas defeat the Afghans in the Battle of Attock and capture the city.
- 1788 – Maryland becomes the seventh state to ratify the United States Constitution.
- 1789 – The Mutiny on the Bounty occurs, with the ship's captain, Lieutenant William Bligh and 18 sailors, set adrift, and the rebel crew setting sail for Tahiti. Eventually the majority of rebels sail for Pitcairn Island.
- 1792 – France invades the Austrian Netherlands (present day Belgium and Luxembourg), beginning the French Revolutionary Wars.
- 1794 – Sardinians, headed by Giovanni Maria Angioy, start a revolution against the Savoy domination, expelling Viceroy Balbiano and his officials from Cagliari, the capital and largest city of the island.
- 1796 – The Armistice of Cherasco is signed by Napoleon Bonaparte and Vittorio Amedeo III, King of Sardinia, expanding French territory along the Mediterranean coast.
- 1858 – The Bawani Imli massacre, where 52 Indian freedom fighters are hanged to death on a tamarind tree by British colonial forces.
- 1859 – The sailing clipper ship Pomona is wrecked on the coast of Ireland with the loss of 424 of the 448 passengers and crew aboard.
- 1869 – Chinese and Irish laborers for the Central Pacific Railroad working on the first transcontinental railroad lay ten miles of track in one day, a feat which has never been matched.
- 1881 – Billy the Kid escapes from the Lincoln County jail in Mesilla, New Mexico.
- 1887 – A week after being arrested by the Prussian Secret Police, French police inspector Guillaume Schnaebelé is released on order of Wilhelm I, German Emperor, defusing a possible war.

=== 1901–present ===
- 1910 – Frenchman Louis Paulhan wins the 1910 London to Manchester air race, the first long-distance aeroplane race in the United Kingdom.
- 1920 – The Azerbaijan Soviet Socialist Republic is founded.
- 1923 – Wembley Stadium is opened, named initially as the Empire Stadium.
- 1930 – The Independence Producers host the first night game in the history of Organized Baseball in Independence, Kansas.
- 1937 – South African medical researcher Max Theiler develops the yellow fever vaccine at the Rockefeller Foundation in New York City.
- 1941 – The Ustaše massacre nearly 200 Serbs in the village of Gudovac, the first massacre of their genocidal campaign against Serbs of the Independent State of Croatia.
- 1944 – World War II: Nine German E-boats attack US and UK units during Exercise Tiger, the rehearsal for the Normandy landings, killing 946.
- 1945 – Benito Mussolini and his mistress Clara Petacci are shot dead by Walter Audisio, a member of the Italian resistance movement.
- 1945 – The Holocaust: Nazi Germany carries out its final use of gas chambers to execute 33 Upper Austrian socialist and communist leaders in Mauthausen concentration camp.
- 1947 – Thor Heyerdahl and five crew mates set out from Peru on the Kon-Tiki to demonstrate that Peruvian natives could have settled Polynesia.
- 1948 – Igor Stravinsky conducts the premiere of his American ballet, Orpheus at the New York City Center.
- 1949 – The Hukbalahap are accused of assassinating former First Lady of the Philippines Aurora Quezon, while she is en route to dedicate a hospital in memory of her late husband; her daughter and ten others are also killed.
- 1952 – Dwight D. Eisenhower resigns as Supreme Allied Commander of NATO in order to campaign in the 1952 United States presidential election.
- 1952 – The Treaty of San Francisco comes into effect, restoring Japanese sovereignty and ending its state of war with most of the Allies of World War II.
- 1952 – The Sino-Japanese Peace Treaty (Treaty of Taipei) is signed in Taipei, Taiwan between Japan and the Republic of China to officially end the Second Sino-Japanese War.
- 1965 – United States occupation of the Dominican Republic: American troops land in the Dominican Republic to "forestall establishment of a Communist dictatorship" and to evacuate US Army troops.
- 1967 – Vietnam War: Boxer Muhammad Ali refuses his induction into the United States Army and is subsequently stripped of his championship and license.
- 1969 – Charles de Gaulle resigns as President of France.
- 1970 – Vietnam War: US President Richard Nixon formally authorizes American combat troops to take part in the Cambodian campaign.
- 1973 – The Dark Side of the Moon by Pink Floyd, recorded in Abbey Road Studios goes to number one on the US Billboard chart, beginning a record-breaking 741-week chart run.
- 1975 – General Cao Văn Viên, chief of the South Vietnamese military, departs for the US as the North Vietnamese Army closes in on victory.
- 1977 – The Red Army Faction trial ends, with Andreas Baader, Gudrun Ensslin and Jan-Carl Raspe found guilty of four counts of murder and more than 30 counts of attempted murder.
- 1978 – The President of Afghanistan, Mohammad Daoud Khan, is overthrown and assassinated in a coup led by pro-communist rebels.
- 1983 – The West German news magazine Stern begins publishing excerpts from the purported diaries of Adolf Hitler, later revealed to be forgeries.
- 1986 – High levels of radiation resulting from the Chernobyl disaster are detected at Forsmark Nuclear Power Plant in Sweden, leading Soviet authorities to publicly announce the accident.
- 1988 – Near Maui, Hawaii, flight attendant Clarabelle "C.B." Lansing is blown out of Aloha Airlines Flight 243, a Boeing 737, and falls to her death when part of the plane's fuselage rips open in mid-flight.
- 1991 – Space Shuttle Discovery launches on STS-39, the first unclassified shuttle mission for the United States Department of Defense.
- 1994 – Former Central Intelligence Agency counterintelligence officer and analyst Aldrich Ames pleads guilty to giving US secrets to the Soviet Union and later Russia.
- 1996 – Whitewater controversy: President Bill Clinton gives a 4 1/2 hour videotaped testimony for the defense.
- 1996 – Port Arthur massacre, Tasmania: A gunman, Martin Bryant, opens fire at the Broad Arrow Cafe in Port Arthur, Tasmania, killing 35 people and wounding 23 others.
- 2004 – CBS News releases evidence of the Abu Ghraib torture and prisoner abuse. The photographs show rape and abuse from the American troops over Iraqi detainees.

== Births ==
=== Pre-1600 ===
- AD 32 – Otho, Roman emperor (died 69 AD)
- 1402 – Nezahualcoyotl, Acolhuan philosopher, warrior, poet and ruler (died 1472)
- 1442 – Edward IV, king of England (died 1483)
- 1545 – Yi Sun-sin, Korean commander (died 1598)
- 1573 – Charles de Valois, Duke of Angoulême, son of Charles IX (died 1650)

=== 1601–1900 ===
- 1604 – Joris Jansen Rapelje, Dutch settler in colonial North America (died 1662)
- 1623 – Wilhelmus Beekman, Dutch politician (died 1707)
- 1630 – Charles Cotton, English poet and author (died 1687)
- 1676 – Frederick I, prince consort and king of Sweden (died 1751)
- 1715 – Franz Sparry, Austrian composer and educator (died 1767)
- 1758 – James Monroe, American soldier, lawyer, and politician, 5th President of the United States (died 1831)
- 1761 – Marie Harel, French cheesemaker (died 1844)
- 1765 – Sylvestre François Lacroix, French mathematician and academic (died 1834)
- 1819 – Ezra Abbot, American scholar and academic (died 1884)
- 1827 – William Hall, Canadian soldier, Victoria Cross recipient (died 1904)
- 1838 – Tobias Asser, Dutch lawyer and scholar, Nobel Prize laureate (died 1913)
- 1848 – Ludvig Schytte, Danish pianist, composer, and educator (died 1909)
- 1854 – Hertha Marks Ayrton, Polish-British engineer, mathematician, and physicist. (died 1923)
- 1855 – José Malhoa, Portuguese painter (died 1933)
- 1863 – Josiah Thomas, English-Australian miner and politician, 7th Australian Minister for Foreign Affairs (died 1933)
- 1863 – Nikolai von Meck, Russian engineer (died 1929)
- 1865 – Charles W. Woodworth, American entomologist and academic (died 1940)
- 1868 – Lucy Booth, English composer (died 1953)
- 1868 – Georgy Voronoy, Ukrainian-Russian mathematician and academic (died 1908)
- 1874 – Karl Kraus, Austrian journalist and author (died 1936)
- 1874 – Sidney Toler, American actor and director (died 1947)
- 1876 – Nicola Romeo, Italian engineer and businessman (died 1938)
- 1878 – Lionel Barrymore, American actor and director (died 1954)
- 1886 – Erich Salomon, German-born news photographer (died 1944)
- 1886 – Art Shaw, American hurdler (died 1955)
- 1888 – Walter Tull, English footballer and soldier (died 1918)
- 1889 – António de Oliveira Salazar, Portuguese economist and politician, 100th Prime Minister of Portugal (died 1970)
- 1896 – Na Hye-sok, South Korean journalist, poet, and painter (died 1948)
- 1896 – Tristan Tzara, Romanian-French poet and critic (died 1963)
- 1897 – Ye Jianying, Chinese general and politician, Head of State of the People's Republic of China (died 1986)
- 1900 – Alice Berry, Australian activist (died 1978)
- 1900 – Heinrich Müller, German SS officer, Gestapo chief, and key individual in the Holocaust (died 1945)
- 1900 – Jan Oort, Dutch astronomer and academic (died 1992)

=== 1901–present ===
- 1901 – H. B. Stallard, English runner and surgeon (died 1973)
- 1902 – Johan Borgen, Norwegian author and critic (died 1979)
- 1906 – Kurt Gödel, Czech-American mathematician, philosopher, and academic (died 1978)
- 1906 – Paul Sacher, Swiss conductor and philanthropist (died 1999)
- 1908 – Ethel Catherwood, American-Canadian high jumper and javelin thrower (died 1987)
- 1908 – Jack Fingleton, Australian cricketer, journalist, and sportscaster (died 1981)
- 1908 – Oskar Schindler, Czech-German businessman (died 1974)
- 1909 – Arthur Võõbus, Estonian-American theologist and orientalist (died 1988)
- 1910 – Sam Merwin, Jr., American author (died 1996)
- 1911 – Lee Falk, American director, producer, and playwright (died 1999)
- 1912 – Odette Hallowes, French soldier and spy (died 1995)
- 1912 – Kaneto Shindō, Japanese director, producer, and screenwriter (died 2012)
- 1913 – Rose Murphy, American singer (died 1989)
- 1914 – Michel Mohrt, French author, historian (died 2011)
- 1916 – Ferruccio Lamborghini, Italian businessman, created Lamborghini (died 1993)
- 1917 – Robert Cornthwaite, American actor (died 2006)
- 1921 – Rowland Evans, American soldier, journalist, and author (died 2001)
- 1921 – Simin Daneshvar, Iranian author and academic (died 2012)
- 1922 – Barbara Lüdemann, German politician (died 1992)
- 1923 – Carolyn Cassady, American author (died 2013)
- 1923 – William Guarnere, American sergeant (died 2014)
- 1924 – Dick Ayers, American author and illustrator (died 2014)
- 1924 – Blossom Dearie, American singer and pianist (died 2009)
- 1924 – Kenneth Kaunda, Zambian educator and politician, first president of Zambia (died 2021)
- 1925 – T. John Lesinski, American judge and politician, 51st Lieutenant Governor of Michigan (died 1996)
- 1925 – John Leonard Thorn, English lieutenant, author, and academic (died 2023)
- 1926 – James Bama, American artist and illustrator (died 2022)
- 1926 – Bill Blackbeard, American historian and author (died 2011)
- 1926 – Harper Lee, American novelist (died 2016)
- 1926 – Hulusi Sayın, Turkish general (died 1991)
- 1928 – Yves Klein, French painter (died 1962)
- 1928 – Eugene Merle Shoemaker, American geologist and astronomer (died 1997)
- 1930 – James Baker, American lawyer and politician, 61st United States Secretary of State
- 1930 – Carolyn Jones, American actress (died 1983)
- 1933 – Miodrag Radulovacki, Serbian-American neuropharmacologist and academic (died 2014)
- 1934 – Lois Duncan, American journalist and author (died 2016)
- 1935 – Pedro Ramos, Cuban baseball player
- 1936 – Tariq Aziz, Iraqi journalist and politician, Iraqi Minister of Foreign Affairs (died 2015)
- 1937 – Saddam Hussein, Iraqi general and politician, 5th President of Iraq (died 2006)
- 1937 – Jean Redpath, Scottish singer-songwriter (died 2014)
- 1937 – John White, Scottish international footballer (died 1964)
- 1938 – Madge Sinclair, Jamaican-American actress (died 1995)
- 1941 – Ann-Margret, Swedish-American actress, singer, and dancer
- 1941 – Lucien Aimar, French cyclist
- 1941 – John Madejski, English businessman and academic
- 1941 – Karl Barry Sharpless, American chemist and academic, Nobel Prize laureate
- 1941 – Iryna Zhylenko, Ukrainian poet and author (died 2013)
- 1942 – Mike Brearley, English cricketer and psychoanalyst
- 1943 – Aryeh Bibi, Iraqi-born Israeli politician
- 1944 – Elizabeth LeCompte, American director and producer
- 1944 – Jean-Claude Van Cauwenberghe, Belgian politician, 10th Minister-President of Wallonia
- 1944 – Alice Waters, American chef and author
- 1946 – Nour El-Sherif, Egyptian actor and producer (died 2015)
- 1946 – Ginette Reno, Canadian singer-songwriter and actress
- 1946 – Larissa Grunig, American theorist and activist
- 1947 – Steve Khan, American jazz guitarist
- 1948 – Terry Pratchett, English journalist, author, and screenwriter (died 2015)
- 1948 – Marcia Strassman, American actress and singer (died 2014)
- 1949 – Jeremy Cooke, English lawyer and judge
- 1949 – Paul Guilfoyle, American actor
- 1949 – Bruno Kirby, American actor and director (died 2006)
- 1950 – Willie Colón, American salsa musician and social activist (died 2026)
- 1950 – Jay Leno, American comedian, talk show host, and producer
- 1950 – Steve Rider, English journalist and sportscaster
- 1951 – Tim Congdon, English economist and politician
- 1951 – Larry Smith, Canadian football player and politician
- 1952 – Chuck Leavell, American singer-songwriter and keyboard player
- 1952 – Mary McDonnell, American actress
- 1953 – Roberto Bolaño, Chilean novelist, short-story writer, poet, and essayist (died 2003)
- 1953 – Kim Gordon, American singer-songwriter, guitarist, and producer
- 1953 – Brian Greenhoff, English footballer and coach (died 2013)
- 1954 – Timothy Curley, American educator
- 1954 – Michael P. Jackson, American politician, 3rd Deputy Secretary of Homeland Security
- 1954 – Vic Sotto, Filipino actor-producer, singer-songwriter, comedian and television personality
- 1954 – Ron Zook, American football player and coach
- 1955 – Saeb Erekat, Chief Palestinian negotiator (died 2020)
- 1955 – Eddie Jobson, English keyboard player and violinist
- 1956 – Jimmy Barnes, Scottish-Australian singer-songwriter and guitarist
- 1958 – Hal Sutton, American golfer
- 1960 – Tom Browning, American baseball player (died 2022)
- 1960 – Elena Kagan, American lawyer and jurist, Associate Justice of the Supreme Court of the United States
- 1960 – Phil King, English bass player
- 1960 – Ian Rankin, Scottish author
- 1960 – Jón Páll Sigmarsson, Icelandic strongman and weightlifter (died 1993)
- 1960 – Walter Zenga, Italian footballer and manager
- 1963 – Lloyd Eisler, Canadian figure skater and coach
- 1963 – Marc Lacroix, Belgian biochemist and academic
- 1964 – Stephen Ames, Trinidadian golfer
- 1964 – Noriyuki Iwadare, Japanese composer
- 1964 – Ajay Kakkar, Baron Kakkar, English surgeon and academic
- 1964 – Barry Larkin, American baseball player, manager, and sportscaster
- 1964 – L'Wren Scott, American model and fashion designer (died 2014)
- 1966 – John Daly, American golfer
- 1966 – Too Short, American rapper, producer and actor
- 1967 – Chris White, English engineer and politician
- 1968 – Petra Bayr, Austrian politician
- 1968 – Howard Donald, English singer-songwriter and producer
- 1968 – Andy Flower, South-African-Zimbabwean cricketer and coach
- 1969 – LeRon Perry Ellis, American basketball player
- 1970 – Richard Fromberg, Australian tennis player
- 1970 – Nicklas Lidström, Swedish ice hockey player and scout
- 1970 – Diego Simeone, Argentinian footballer and manager
- 1971 – Bridget Moynahan, American actress
- 1972 – Violent J, American rapper
- 1972 – Jean-Paul van Gastel, Dutch footballer and manager
- 1973 – Jorge Garcia, American actor and producer
- 1973 – Andrew Mehrtens, South African-New Zealand rugby player
- 1974 – Penélope Cruz, Spanish actress and producer
- 1974 – Margo Dydek, Polish basketball player and coach (died 2011)
- 1974 – Vernon Kay, English radio and television host
- 1974 – Dominic Matteo, Scottish footballer and journalist
- 1975 – Michael Walchhofer, Austrian skier
- 1977 – Titus O'Neil, American wrestler and football player
- 1978 – Lauren Laverne, English singer and television and radio host
- 1979 – Scott Fujita, American football player and sportscaster
- 1980 – Bradley Wiggins, English cyclist
- 1981 – Jessica Alba, American model and actress
- 1982 – Nikki Grahame, English model and journalist (died 2021)
- 1982 – Chris Kaman, American basketball player
- 1983 – Josh Brookes, Australian motorcycle racer
- 1983 – David Freese, American baseball player
- 1983 – Roger Johnson, English footballer
- 1983 – Thomas Waldrom, New Zealand-English rugby player
- 1984 – Dmitri Torbinski, Russian footballer
- 1985 – Lucas Jakubczyk, German sprinter and long jumper
- 1985 – Deividas Stagniūnas, Lithuanian ice dancer
- 1986 – Roman Polák, Czech ice hockey player
- 1986 – Jenna Ushkowitz, Korean-American actress, singer, and dancer
- 1987 – Daequan Cook, American basketball player
- 1987 – Drew Gulak, American wrestler
- 1987 – Samantha Ruth Prabhu, Indian actress and model
- 1987 – Bradley Johnson, English footballer
- 1987 – Zoran Tošić, Serbian footballer
- 1988 – Jonathan Biabiany, French footballer
- 1988 – Juan Mata, Spanish footballer
- 1989 – Emil Salomonsson, Swedish footballer
- 1989 – Kim Sung-kyu, South Korean singer
- 1992 – Blake Bortles, American football player
- 1992 – DeMarcus Lawrence, American football player
- 1993 – Matt Chapman, American baseball player
- 1993 – Eva Samková, Czech snowboarder
- 1994 – Jakob Butturff, American bowler (died 2026)
- 1994 – Wonpil, South Korean musician
- 1995 – Connor Clifton, American ice hockey player
- 1995 – Mara Sattei, Italian singer-songwriter
- 1995 – Melanie Martinez, American singer
- 1997 – Amaia Aberasturi, Spanish actress
- 1997 – Shane McClanahan, American baseball player
- 1997 – Denzel Ward, American football player
- 1998 – Song Yu-bin, South Korean singer and actor
- 2000 – Victoria De Angelis, Italian musician
- 2000 – Alek Thomas, American baseball player
- 2001 – Anthony Volpe, American baseball player

== Deaths ==
=== Pre-1600 ===
- 224 – Artabanus IV of Parthia (born 191)
- 948 – Hu Jinsi, Chinese general and prefect
- 988 – Adaldag, archbishop of Bremen
- 992 – Jawhar as-Siqilli, Fatimid statesman
- 1109 – Abbot Hugh of Cluny (born 1024)
- 1192 – Conrad of Montferrat (born 1140)
- 1197 – Rhys ap Gruffydd, prince of Deheubarth (born 1132)
- 1257 – Shajar al-Durr, sovereign sultana of Egypt
- 1260 – Luchesius Modestini, founding member of the Third Order of St. Francis
- 1400 – Baldus de Ubaldis, Italian jurist (born 1327)
- 1489 – Henry Percy, 4th Earl of Northumberland, English politician (born 1449)
- 1533 – Nicholas West, English bishop and diplomat (born 1461)

=== 1601–1900 ===
- 1643 – Francisco de Lucena, Portuguese politician (born 1578)
- 1710 – Thomas Betterton, English actor and manager (born 1630)
- 1716 – Louis de Montfort, French priest and saint (born 1673)
- 1726 – Thomas Pitt, English merchant and politician (born 1653)
- 1741 – Magnus Julius De la Gardie, Swedish general and politician (born 1668)
- 1772 – Johann Friedrich Struensee, German physician and politician (born 1737)
- 1781 – Cornelius Harnett, American merchant, farmer, and politician (born 1723)
- 1813 – Mikhail Kutuzov, Russian field marshal (born 1745)
- 1816 – Johann Heinrich Abicht, German philosopher, author, and academic (born 1762)
- 1841 – Peter Chanel, French priest, missionary, and martyr (born 1803)
- 1853 – Ludwig Tieck, German author and poet (born 1773)
- 1858 – Johannes Peter Müller, German physiologist and anatomist (born 1801)
- 1865 – Samuel Cunard, Canadian-English businessman, founded Cunard Line (born 1787)
- 1881 – Antoine Samuel Adam-Salomon, French sculptor and photographer (born 1818)
- 1883 – John Russell, English hunter and dog breeder (born 1795)

=== 1901–present ===
- 1902 – Cyprien Tanguay, Canadian priest and historian (born 1819)
- 1903 – Josiah Willard Gibbs, American scientist (born 1839)
- 1905 – Fitzhugh Lee, American general and politician, 40th Governor of Virginia (born 1835)
- 1921 – Maurice Moore (Irish republican), executed member of the Irish Republican Army (born 1894)
- 1925 – Richard Butler, English-Australian politician, 23rd Premier of South Australia (born 1850)
- 1928 – May Jordan McConnel, Australian trade unionist and suffragist (born 1860)
- 1929 – Hendrik van Heuckelum, Dutch footballer (born 1879)
- 1936 – Fuad I of Egypt (born 1868)
- 1939 – Anne Walter Fearn, American physician (born 1867)
- 1944 – Mohammed Alim Khan, Manghud ruler (born 1880)
- 1944 – Frank Knox, American journalist and politician, 46th United States Secretary of the Navy (born 1874)
- 1945 – Roberto Farinacci, Italian soldier and politician (born 1892)
- 1945 – Hermann Fegelein, German general (born 1906)
- 1945 – Benito Mussolini, Italian journalist, fascist dictator and politician, 27th Prime Minister of Italy (born 1883)
- 1946 – Louis Bachelier, French mathematician and academic (born 1870)
- 1954 – Léon Jouhaux, French union leader, Nobel Prize laureate (born 1879)
- 1956 – Fred Marriott, American race car driver (born 1872)
- 1957 – Heinrich Bär, German colonel and pilot (born 1913)
- 1962 – Bennie Osler, South African rugby player (born 1901)
- 1963 – Wilhelm Weber, German gymnast (born 1880)
- 1970 – Ed Begley, American actor (born 1901)
- 1973 – Clas Thunberg, Finnish speed skater (born 1893)
- 1976 – Richard Hughes, British author and poet (born 1900)
- 1977 – Ricardo Cortez, American actor (born 1900)
- 1977 – Sepp Herberger, German footballer and coach (born 1897)
- 1978 – Mohammed Daoud Khan, Afghan commander and politician, 1st President of Afghanistan (born 1909)
- 1980 – Tommy Caldwell, American bass player (born 1949)
- 1987 – Ben Linder, American engineer and activist (born 1959)
- 1989 – Esa Pakarinen, Finnish actor and musician (born 1911)
- 1991 – Steve Broidy, American film producer (born 1905)
- 1992 – Francis Bacon, Irish painter (born 1909)
- 1993 – Diva Diniz Corrêa, Brazilian zoologist (born 1918)
- 1993 – Jim Valvano, American basketball player, coach, and sportscaster (born 1946)
- 1994 – Berton Roueché, American journalist and author (born 1910)
- 1996 – Lester Sumrall, American minister, founded LeSEA (born 1913)
- 1997 – Ann Petry, American novelist (born 1908)
- 1998 – Jerome Bixby, American author and screenwriter (born 1923)
- 1999 – Rory Calhoun, American actor, producer, and screenwriter (born 1922)
- 1999 – Rolf Landauer, German-American physicist and engineer (born 1927)
- 1999 – Alf Ramsey, English footballer and manager (born 1920)
- 1999 – Arthur Leonard Schawlow, American physicist and academic, Nobel Prize laureate (born 1921)
- 2000 – Jerzy Einhorn, Polish-Swedish physician and politician (born 1925)
- 2000 – Penelope Fitzgerald, English author and poet (born 1916)
- 2002 – Alexander Lebed, Russian general and politician (born 1950)
- 2002 – Lou Thesz, American wrestler and trainer (born 1916)
- 2005 – Percy Heath, American bassist (born 1923)
- 2005 – Chris Candido, American wrestler (born 1971)
- 2005 – Taraki Sivaram, Sri Lankan journalist and author (born 1959)
- 2006 – Steve Howe, American baseball player (born 1958)
- 2007 – Dabbs Greer, American actor (born 1917)
- 2007 – René Mailhot, Canadian journalist (born 1942)
- 2007 – Tommy Newsom, American saxophonist and bandleader (born 1929)
- 2007 – Carl Friedrich von Weizsäcker, German physicist and philosopher (born 1912)
- 2007 – Bertha Wilson, Scottish-Canadian lawyer and jurist (born 1923)
- 2009 – Ekaterina Maximova, Russian ballerina and actress (born 1939)
- 2009 – Richard Pratt, Polish-Australian businessman (born 1934)
- 2011 – Erhard Loretan, Swiss mountaineer (born 1959)
- 2012 – Fred Allen, New Zealand rugby player and coach (born 1920)
- 2012 – Matilde Camus, Spanish poet and author (born 1919)
- 2012 – Al Ecuyer, American football player (born 1937)
- 2012 – Patricia Medina, English actress (born 1919)
- 2012 – Milan N. Popović, Serbian psychiatrist and author (born 1924)
- 2012 – Aberdeen Shikoyi, Kenyan rugby player (born 1985)
- 2013 – Brad Lesley, American baseball player (born 1958)
- 2013 – Fredrick McKissack, American author (born 1939)
- 2013 – John C. Reynolds, American computer scientist and academic (born 1935)
- 2013 – Jack Shea, American director, producer, and screenwriter (born 1928)
- 2013 – János Starker, Hungarian-American cellist and educator (born 1924)
- 2013 – Paulo Vanzolini, Brazilian singer-songwriter and zoologist (born 1924)
- 2013 – Bernie Wood, New Zealand journalist and author (born 1939)
- 2014 – Barbara Fiske Calhoun, American cartoonist and painter (born 1919)
- 2014 – William Honan, American journalist and author (born 1930)
- 2014 – Dennis Kamakahi, American guitarist and composer (born 1953)
- 2014 – Edgar Laprade, Canadian ice hockey player (born 1919)
- 2014 – Jack Ramsay, American basketball player, coach, and sportscaster (born 1925)
- 2014 – Idris Sardi, Indonesian violinist and composer (born 1938)
- 2014 – Frederic Schwartz, American architect, co-designed Empty Sky (born 1951)
- 2014 – Ryan Tandy, Australian rugby player (born 1981)
- 2015 – Antônio Abujamra, Brazilian actor and director (born 1932)
- 2015 – Marcia Brown, American author and illustrator (born 1918)
- 2015 – Michael J. Ingelido, American general (born 1916)
- 2016 – Jenny Diski, English author and screenwriter (born 1947)
- 2017 – Mariano Gagnon, American Catholic priest and author (born 1929)
- 2018 – James Hylton, American race car driver (born 1934)
- 2019 – Richard Lugar, American politician (born 1932)
- 2019 – John Singleton, American film director (born 1968)
- 2021 – Michael Collins, American astronaut (born 1930)
- 2021 – El Risitas, Spanish comedian (born 1956)
- 2024 – Brian McCardie, Scottish actor and writer (born 1965)

== Holidays and observances ==
- Christian feast day:
  - Aphrodisius and companions
  - Gianna Beretta Molla
  - Kirill of Turov (Orthodox, added to Roman Martyrology in 1969)
  - Louis de Montfort
  - Blessed Marie Louise Trichet
  - Pamphilus of Sulmona
  - Peter Chanel
  - Vitalis and Valeria of Milan
  - April 28 (Eastern Orthodox liturgics)
- Mujahideen Victory Day (Afghanistan)
- National Heroes Day (Barbados)
- Restoration of Sovereignty Day (Japan)
- Sardinia Day (Sardinia)
- Workers' Memorial Day and World Day for Safety and Health at Work (international)
  - National Day of Mourning (Canada)
- Ed Balls Day
