= Mailhot =

Mailhot is a surname. Notable people with it include:

- Brian Mailhot (born 1975), American professional wrestler
- Jacques Mailhot (1961–2025), Canadian ice hockey player
- Jeffrey Mailhot (born 1970), American serial killer
- René Mailhot (c.1942–2007), Canadian journalist
- Terese Marie Mailhot, First Nation Canadian writer, journalist, memoirist, and teacher

== See also ==
- Hotmail
