= April 29 (Eastern Orthodox liturgics) =

Day in the Eastern Orthodox liturgical calendar

Eastern Orthodox liturgical calendar
| April 28 | April 29 | April 30 |
April 29 O.S. ≍ May 12 N.S. April 29 N.S ≍ April 16 O.S.

An Eastern Orthodox cross

April 29 in Eastern Orthodox liturgical calendars is a feast day and a day of commemoration of saints and martyrs. Although some Orthodox churches use the Revised Julian Calendar and others use the traditional Julian calendar, the fixed commemorations for their respective April 29 are broadly the same, no matter which calendar is used. (Note: Despite the dates being the same, the days to which they refer typically differ by 13 days. The notation Old Style or O.S. is sometimes used to indicate a date in the traditional Julian Calendar (the "Old Calendar"). The notation New Style or N.S. indicates a date in the Revised Julian calendar (the "New Calendar").)

== Saints ==
- Apostles Jason and Sosipater of the Seventy, and their companions, at Corfu (63): (Note: Name days celebrated today include: Jason (Ἰάσονας); Sosipater (Σωσίπατρος).) (see also April 28 - Slavic):
  - Martyrs Saturninus, Jakischolus (Inischolus), Faustianus, Januarius, Marsalius, Euphrasius, Mammius - the holy seven former thieves; (Note: "The same day, seven robbers, who, being converted to Christ by St. Jason, attained to eternal life by martyrdom.")
  - Virgin Martyr Cercyra. (Note: Name days celebrated today include: Kerkyra, Cercyra (Κέρκυρα).)
- Martyrs Zeno, Eusebius, Neon, and Vitalis, who were converted by Apostles Jason and Sosipater (c. 63) (see also April 28 - Slavic)
- Martyrs Vitalius and his wife Valeria (62)
- Venerable Memnon the Wonderworker (2nd century) (see also April 28 - Greek)
- Martyrs Diodorus and Rhodopianus the Deacon, at Aphrodisia in Anatolia (284-305) (see also May 3 - Greek)
- Nine martyrs at Cyzicus (c. 286-299): (see also April 28 - Greek)
  - Theognes, Rufus, Antipater, Theostichus, Artemas, Magnus, Theodotus, Thaumasius, and Philemon.
- Saint Atticus and Cyntianus (Cyntion), martyrs. (Note: They are recorded in the Synaxarion of Delahaye.)
- St. John Tolaius, Patriarch of Alexandria (482)
- Saint Nicetas, Abbot of Synnada (9th century)
- Saint Nicephorus of Sebaze (9th century)

== Pre-Schism Western saints ==
- Martyr Torpes (Tropez), under Nero (65)
- Hieromartyrs Agapius and Secundinus, Bishops in Numidia (259) (Note: "At Cirtha, in Numidia, the birthday of the holy martyrs Agapius and Secundinus, bishops, who, after a long exile in that city, added to the glory of their priesthood the crown of martyrdom. They suffered in the persecution of Valerian, during which the enraged Gentiles made every effort to shake the faith of the just. In their company, suffered Aemilian, soldier, Tertulla and Antonia, consecrated virgin, and a woman with her twin children.")
- Saint Severus of Naples, Bishop of Naples and wonderworker (409) (Note: Bishop of Naples in Italy and a famous wonderworker. He raised a dead man to life so that he bear witness in favour of his persecuted widow.)
- Saint Dictinus, the first convert of St. Patrick in Ulster in Ireland (5th century)
- Saint Paulinus of Brescia, Bishop and confessor (c. 545)
- Saint Secundellus the Deacon, in Gaul (6th century)
- Saint Endelienta, nun and recluse of Cornwall (6th century)
- Saint Senan of North Wales, hermit (7th century)
- Saint Fiachan of Lismore (Fiachina, Fianchne, Fianchine), a monk at Lismore and a disciple of St Carthage the Younger (7th century)
- Saint Wilfrid II, Bishop of York (744)
- Saint Ava of Dinant, a niece of King Pepin, and Abbess of a convent at Denain in Hainault (c. 845)
- Martyr Daniel of Gerona, born in Asia Minor, became a hermit, was martyred in Spain (9th century)

== Post-Schism Orthodox saints ==
- Saint John Kaloktenes, Metropolitan of Thebes, the New Merciful (c. 1180)
- St. Arsenius, Archbishop of Suzdal (1627)
- Saint Basil of Ostrog, Wonderworker of Ostrog, myrrh-streamer, Metropolitan of Zahumlje (1671) (Note: Not only Orthodox, but many Roman Catholics and Muslims also resort to him upon the Day of Pentecost for the healing of their infirmities.)
- Holy Martyrs of Lazeti, Georgia (17th–18th centuries)
- New Martyr Stanko the Shepherd, of Montenegro (1712)
- Venerable Nectarius of Optina, Elder, of Optina Monastery (1928)
- Saint Amphilochius the Wonderworker, Schema-abbot of Pochaev (1971) (Note: He was glorified in 2002.) (see also: December 19 - repose)

=== New martyrs and confessors ===
- New Martyr Vasilije of Peć (17th century) (Note: "St. Vasilije of Peć (17th C.) worked as a baker in the city of Peć. When Albanians kidnapped his daughter, he resolved to intercede for her honor and besought them not to convert her to Islam. The Albanians thus severely beat him with a scimitar and left him to die. His place of burial was venerated by the Orthodox, who later built a church on the spot, although the Turks soon demolished it. His burial place was finally destroyed during the hostilities in Kosovo and Metohija in 1999. His memory will be celebrated on April 29/May 12.")
- New Martyr Athanasia Lepeshkin, Abbess of Zosima Hermitage (Smolensk Hodigitria Convent) (ru), near Moscow (1932) (see also: January 25)

== Other commemorations ==
- Repose of Hieromonk Eulogius of Valaam (1969)

== Icon gallery ==
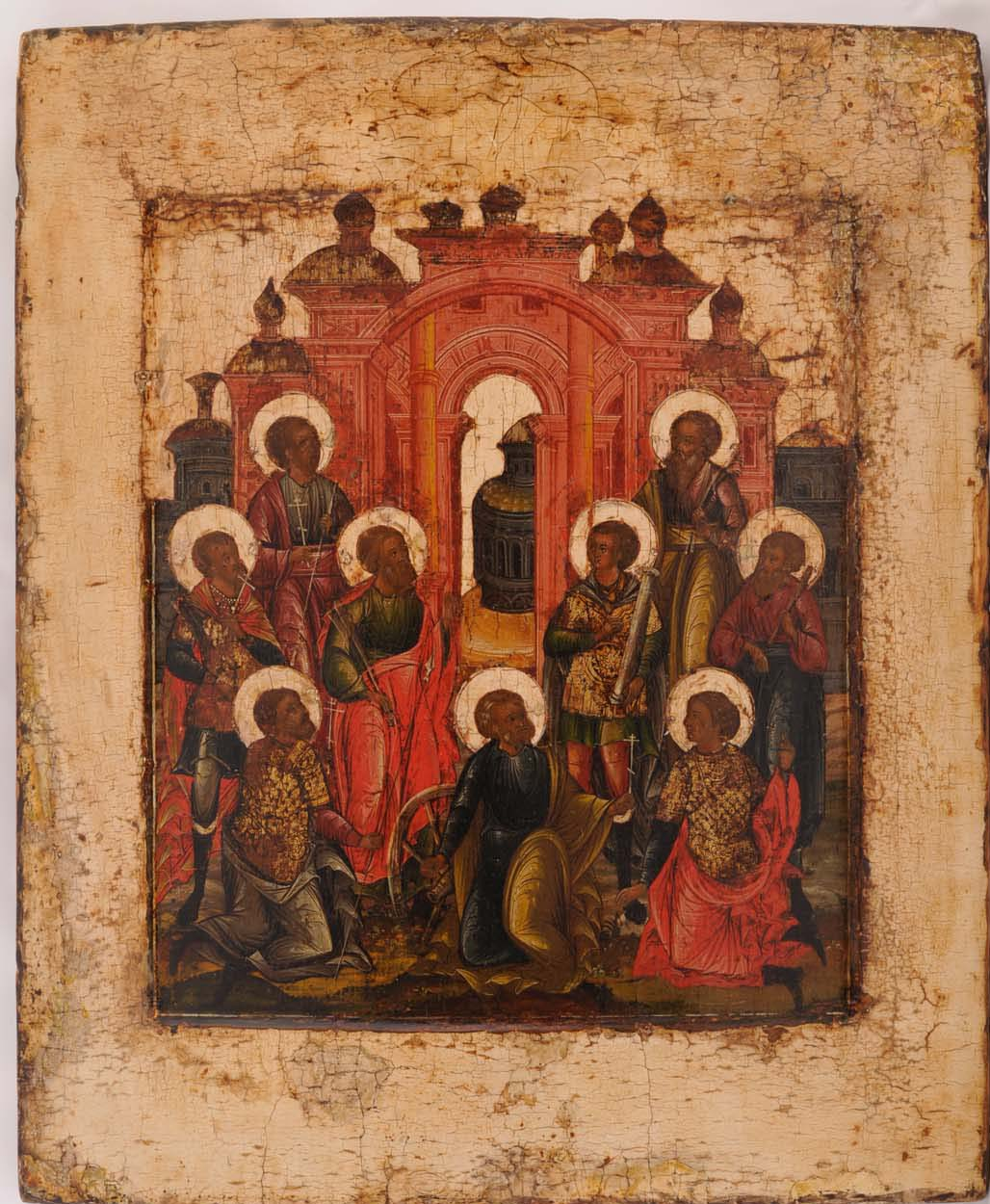
The Nine martyrs of Cyzicus.

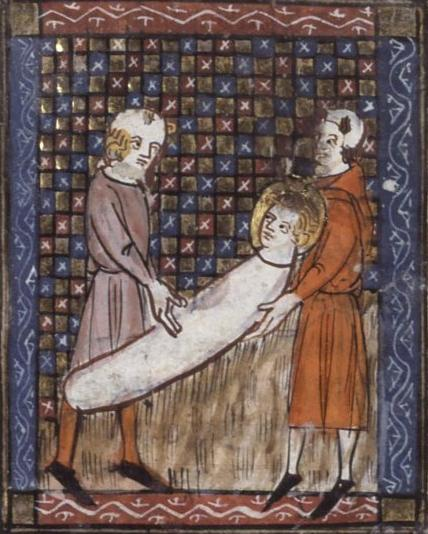
The martyrdom of St. Vitalis of Milan, being buried alive.

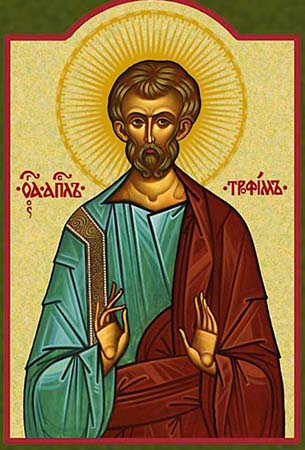
St. Torpes of Pisa.

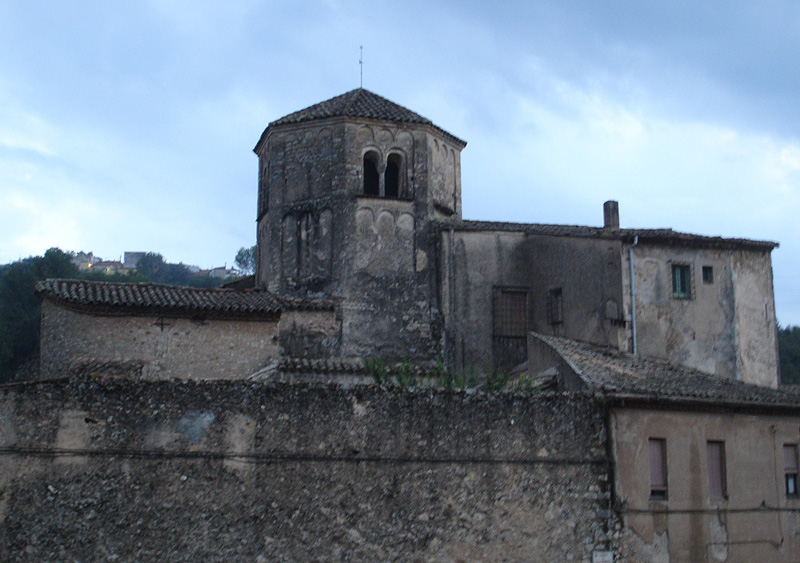
Monastery of St. Daniel (Gerona, Catalonia, Spain).

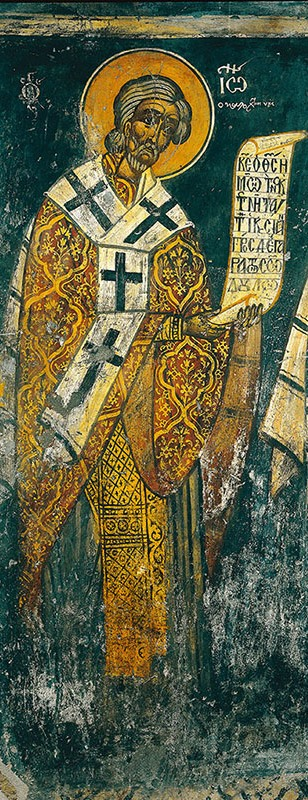
St. John Kaloktenes, Metropolitan of Thebes.

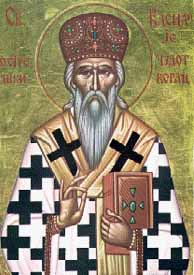
St. Basil of Ostrog.

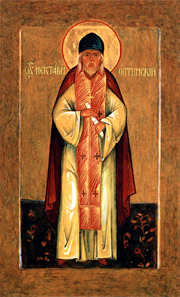
St. Nectarius of Optina.

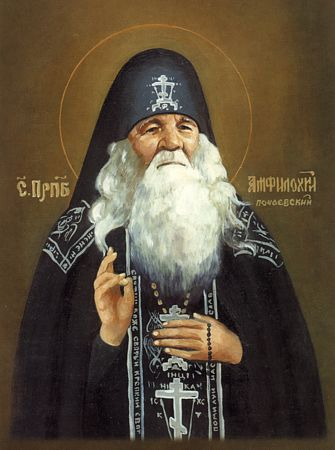
St. Amphilochius of Pochayiv.

== Sources ==
- April 29/May 12. Orthodox Calendar (Pravoslavie.ru).
- May 12 / April 29 (Church Calendar). Holy Trinity Russian Orthodox Church (A parish of the Patriarchate of Moscow).
- April 29. OCA - The Lives of the Saints.
- April 29. Latin Saints of the Orthodox Patriarchate of Rome.
- The Roman Martyrology. Transl. by the Archbishop of Baltimore. Last Edition, According to the Copy Printed at Rome in 1914. Revised Edition, with the Imprimatur of His Eminence Cardinal Gibbons. Baltimore: John Murphy Company, 1916. pp. 120–121.
- Rev. Richard Stanton. A Menology of England and Wales, or, Brief Memorials of the Ancient British and English Saints Arranged According to the Calendar, Together with the Martyrs of the 16th and 17th Centuries. London: Burns & Oates, 1892. pp. 185–186.

Greek Sources

- Great Synaxaristes: (in Greek) 29 Απριλίου. Μέγας Συναξαριστής.
- (in Greek) 29 Απριλίου. Ecclesia.gr. (H Εκκλησία της Ελλάδος).

Russian Sources

- (in Russian) 12 мая (29 апреля). Православная Энциклопедия под редакцией Патриарха Московского и всея Руси Кирилла (электронная версия). (Orthodox Encyclopedia - Pravenc.ru).
- (in Russian) 29 апреля (ст.ст.) 12 мая 2013 (нов. ст.). Русская Православная Церковь Отдел внешних церковных связей. (DECR).
