= Tanguay =

Tanguay is a surname. Notable people with the surname include:

- Alex Tanguay (born 1979), Canadian ice hockey player
- Bill Tanguay (1909–1971), American football player
- Cyprien Tanguay (1819–1902), French-Canadian priest and historian
- Eva Tanguay (1879–1947), Canadian-born singer and entertainer
- Georges Tanguay (1856–1913), Canadian politician
- John Tanguay (born 1998), American rower
- Robyn Leigh Tanguay (born 1966), American researcher and educator

== See also ==
- Yves Tanguy (1900–1955), French painter
