= List of people known as the Wonderworker =

"The Wonderworker" is a religious epithet applied to:

- Dmitry of Uglich (1582-1591), Russian Orthodox saint, tsarevich (heir to the throne), mysteriously killed at an early age
- Hypatius of Gangra (died 326), Eastern Orthodox and Catholic saint and bishop of Gangra in the Byzantine Empire
- John of Shanghai and San Francisco (1896–1966), Eastern Orthodox ascetic and saint
- Leo of Catania (703 or 709–789), Catholic and Eastern Orthodox saint and bishop of Catania
- Saint Memnon, 2nd century Egyptian ascetic and Coptic saint
- Saint Nicholas (270–343), Catholic saint and bishop of Myra
- Peter the Wonderworker, 10th-century Byzantine Christian and Eastern Orthodox saint and bishop of Argos and Nauplion
- Saint Spyridon (c. 270–348), saint and bishop of Trimythous from Cyprus
- Theodore of the Jordan, 6th century Eastern Orthodox and Eastern Catholic saint

== See also ==
- Basil Fool for Christ (1468–1552 or 1557), Wonderworker of Moscow, Russian Orthodox saint and holy fool
- Gregory Thaumaturgus (c. 213–270), Catholic and Orthodox saint and bishop, "Thaumaturgus" being translated as "the wonder worker" or "the miracle worker"
