= May 12 (Eastern Orthodox liturgics) =

Day in the Eastern Orthodox liturgical calendar

Eastern Orthodox liturgical calendar
May 11	May 12	May 13
May 12 O.S. ≍ May 25 N.S. May 12 N.S ≍ April 29 O.S.

An Eastern Orthodox cross

May 12 in Eastern Orthodox liturgical calendars is a feast day and a day of commemoration of saints and martyrs. Although some Orthodox churches use the Revised Julian Calendar and others use the traditional Julian calendar, the fixed commemorations for their respective May 12 are broadly the same, no matter which calendar is used. (Note: Despite the dates being the same, the days to which they refer typically differ by 13 days. The notation Old Style or O.S. is sometimes used to indicate a date in the traditional Julian Calendar (the "Old Calendar"). The notation New Style or N.S. indicates a date in the Revised Julian calendar (the "New Calendar").)

== Saints ==
- Saint Domitilla the martyr (c. 81-96)
- Saints Nereus and Achilleus the martyrs (100)
- Saint Dracontius, Bishop of Nicaea (c. 1st to 3rd centuries) (Note: Note, there is a "Dracontius of Pergamum" who attended the Council of Constantinople (360).)
- Saint Epiphanius, Bishop of Salamis and Metropolitan of Cyprus (403)
- Saint Calliope (Callitropos), nun, sister of St. Epiphanius of Cyprus.
- Saint Sabinus, Archbishop of Cyprus (successor of St. Epiphanius to the Cypriot cathedra) (5th century)
- Saint Polybius of Cyprus, Bishop of Rinokyr in Egypt, Wonderworker (5th century)
- Saint Theophanes, Archbishop of Cyprus (7th century) (Note: His memory is preserved in the Codex Hierosolymitanus of the 11th century.)
- Patriarch Germanus I of Constantinople (740)
- Venerable Theodore of Kythera, ascetic (922)

== Pre-Schism Western saints ==
- Saint Philip of Agira in Sicily, the Hieromartyr (103) (Note: "At Agirone in Sicily, St. Philip, a priest who was sent to that island by the Roman Pontiff, and converted to Christ a great portion of it. His sanctity is particularly manifested by the deliverance of persons possessed.")
- Martyr Pancratius of Rome (304)
- Martyr Dionysius (Denis), uncle of St. Pancratius (304)
- Saint Díoma, teacher of St Declan of Ardmore, patron-saint of Kildimo in Co. Limerick in Ireland (5th century)
- Saint Modoald, Archbishop of Trier, related by blood and united by friendship with most of the saints of the Merovingian period (640)
- Saint Rictrudis, Abbess of Marchiennes Abbey in Flanders (688) (Note: Born in Gascony in France, she married St Adalbald, by whom she had four children - all saints, Maurontius, Eusebia, Clotsindis and Adalsindis. After her husband's repose she became a nun and founded the convent of Marchiennes in the north of France.)
- Saint Æthelhard, Archbishop of Canterbury (805)

== Post-Schism Orthodox saints ==
- Saint Euthemius (Euthymius), Patriarch of Jerusalem (c. 1084 or c. 1224) (Note: His name does not appear in the Synaxaria and the Menaia, but is preserved in the Codex Hierosolymitanus. The Church also observes his feast day on November 7.)
- Saint Nikitas the Sinaite.
- New Martyr John of Serres (15th century)
- Saint Theophanes, Bishop of Solea (Solia), Cyprus, later a hermit in the Troodos Mountains, the Outpourer of Myrrh (1550)
- Venerable Dionysius of Radonezh, Archimandrite of the Troitse-Sergiyeva Lavra(1633) (Note: See: (in Russian) Дионисий Радонежский. Википедии. (Russian Wikipedia).)
- New Martyr John of Wallachia, at Constantinople (1662) (Note: Also John Valaha of Romania or Ioan Valahul (Românul).)
- Saint Anthony (Medvedev) of Radonezh, Archimandrite of Troitse-Sergiyeva Lavra (1877)
- Repose of Saint Nectarius (Tikhonov) of Optina (1928) (Note: Saint Nectarius' is venerated on April 29, and with all the Optina Elders on October 11.)
- Synaxis of the Holy Elders of the Sofronievo-Molchensk Hermitage (2009): (Note: On June 28, 2009, at the Sophrony-Molchensk Pechersk Monastery of the Nativity of Theotokos (in the village of Nova Sloboda, Putivl district of Sumy region), at the Divine Liturgy, headed by Metropolitan Volodymyr, took place the rite of glorification of four God-pleasers, who bore obedience at the monastery at different times. The Holy Synod of the Ukrainian Orthodox Church on the decision of April 14, 2009 blessed for the local glorification and veneration: Archimandrite Theodosy (Maslov), Hieromonk Serapion, Monk Sophrony (Batovrin) in the ranks of the venerable fathers, and; Lay brother Serhiy Tikhonov as fool for Christ.) (Note: See: (in Russian) Софрониево-Молченская Печерская пустынь. Википедии. (Russian Wikipedia).)

- Archimandrite Theodosy (Maslov) (1802); (see also: January 12)
- Hieromonk Serapion (Molchensky) (1718);
- Monk Sophronius (Batovrin) (1692);
- Novice Sergius (Tikhonov), Fool-for-Christ (1879).

=== New martyrs and confessors ===
- New Martyr Abbess Athanasia (Lepeshkina), of the Smolensk Hodigitria Convent near Moscow (1932) (Note: See: (in Russian) Троице-Одигитриевская пустынь. Википедии. (Russian Wikipedia).) (see also: April 29 - OS)
- New Hieromartyr Peter Popov, priest of Yaroslavl-Rostov (1937)
- Martyr Evdokia Martishkina (1938)

== Other commemorations ==
- Consecration of the Cathedral of the Theotokos at Kiev (in 996)
- Glorification (1913) of Hieromartyr Patriarch Hermogenes of Moscow (1612)
- Discovery of the holy relics (1961) of Saint Irene of Lesvos the Virgin-martyr (1463)
- Second Uncovering of the relics (1992) of Righteous Simeon of Verkhoturye (1642)
- Commemoration of Monk Dorotheus, Disciple of St. Dionysius of St. Sergius Lavra (1622)

== Icon gallery ==
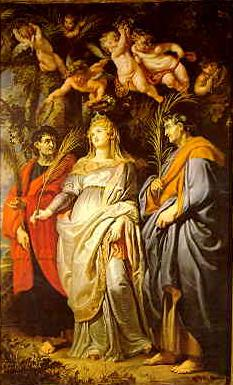
Sts. Domitilla, Nereus, and Achilleus (Peter Paul Rubens).

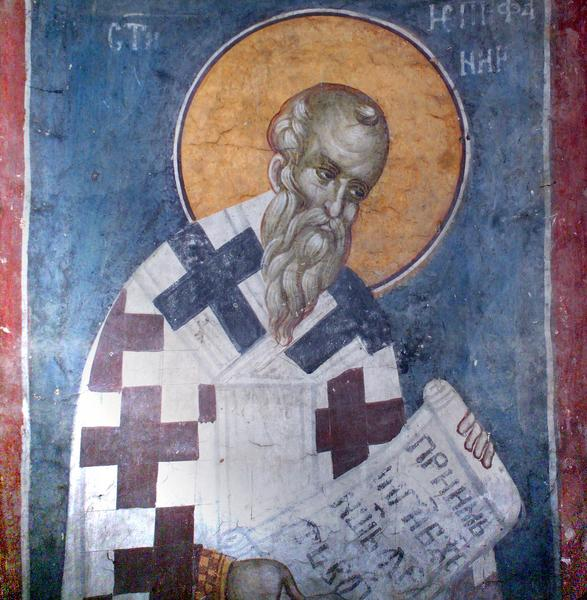
St. Epiphanius of Salamis.

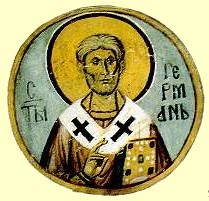
Patriarch Germanus I of Constantinople.

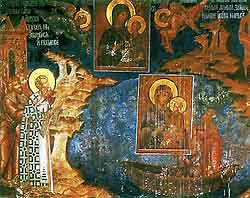
Patriarch Germanus I of Constantinople and the Liddskaja icon.

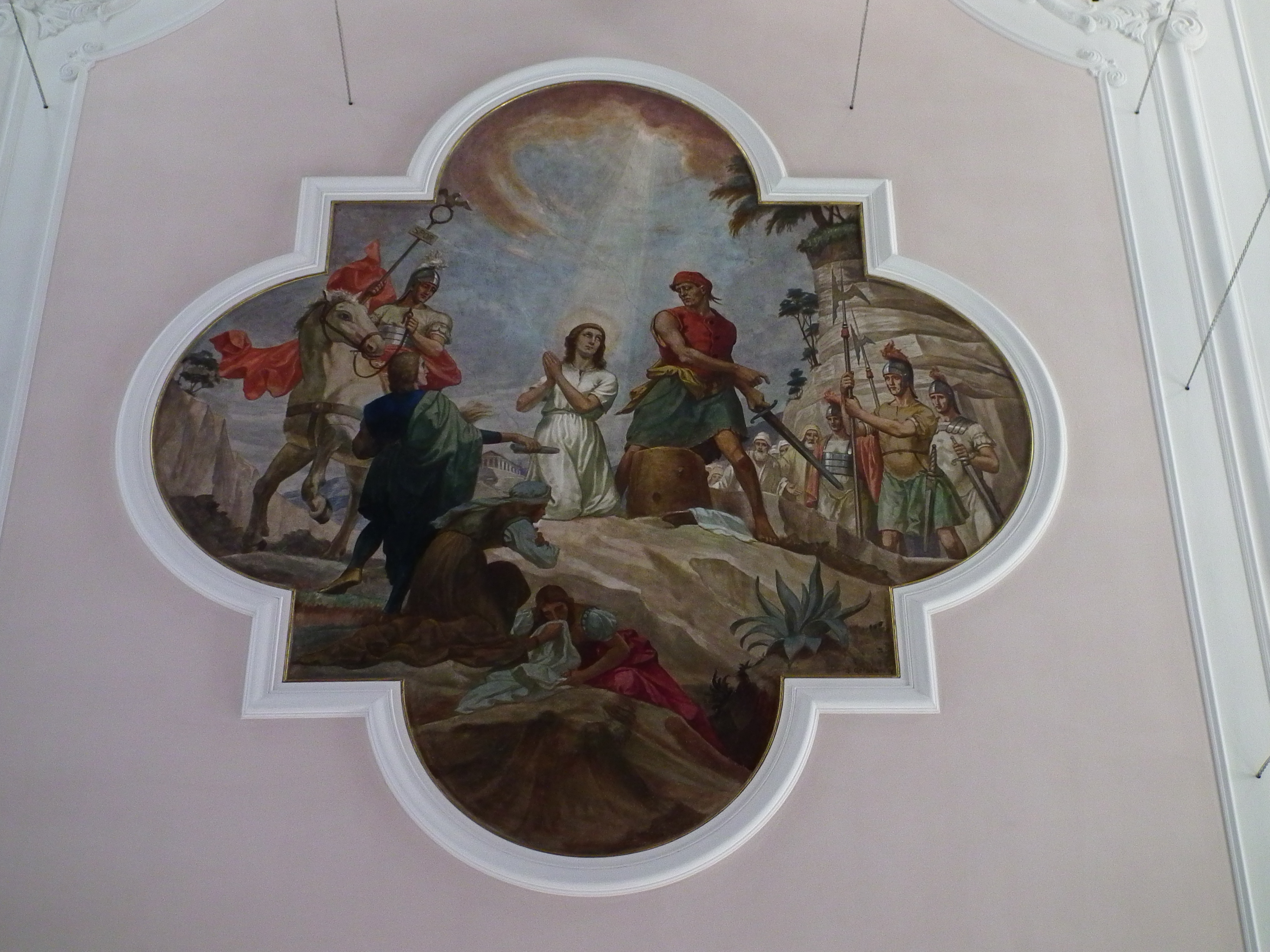
St. Pancratius of Rome.

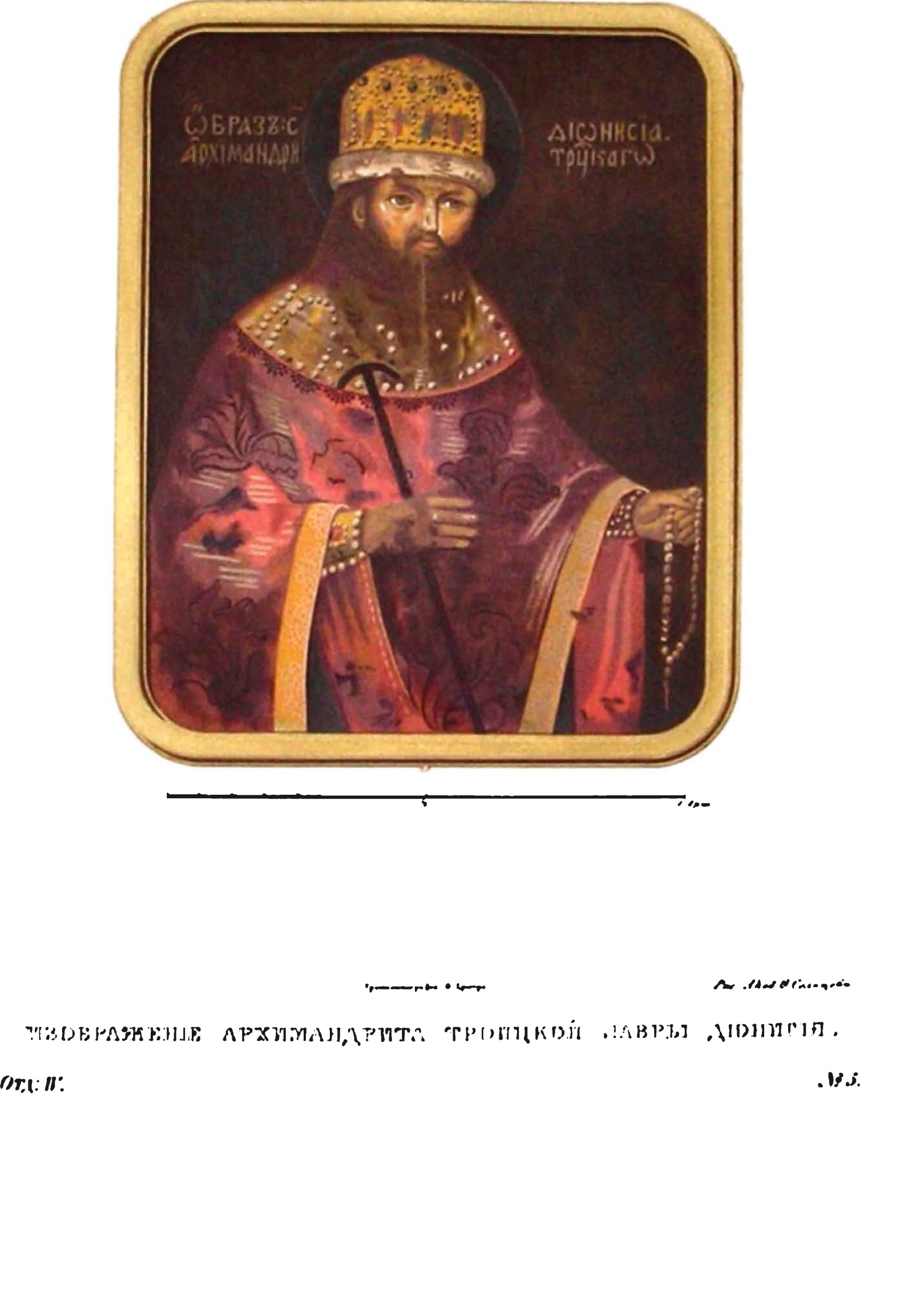
St. Dionysius of Radonezh, Archimandrite of the Troitse-Sergiyeva Lavra.

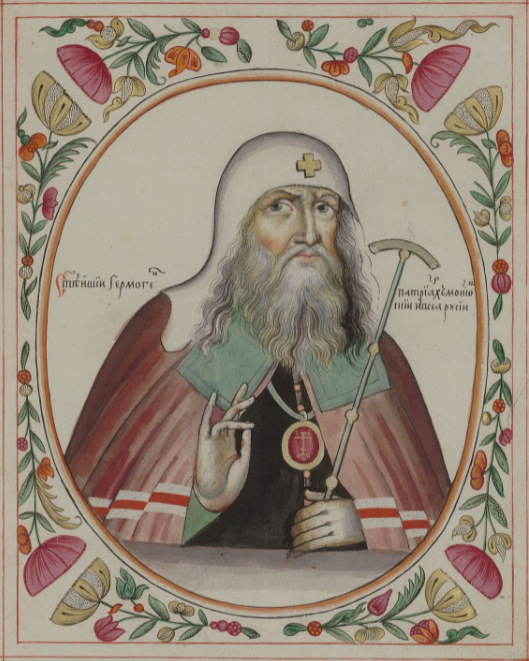
Hieromartyr Patriarch Hermogenes of Moscow.

== Sources ==
- May 12/25. Orthodox Calendar (PRAVOSLAVIE.RU).
- May 25 / May 12. HOLY TRINITY RUSSIAN ORTHODOX CHURCH (A parish of the Patriarchate of Moscow)
- May 12. OCA - The Lives of the Saints.
- May 12. Latin Saints of the Orthodox Patriarchate of Rome.
- May 12. The Roman Martyrology.

Greek Sources

- Great Synaxaristes: (in Greek) 12 ΜΑΪΟΥ. ΜΕΓΑΣ ΣΥΝΑΞΑΡΙΣΤΗΣ.
- (in Greek) Συναξαριστής. 12 Μαΐου. ECCLESIA.GR. (H ΕΚΚΛΗΣΙΑ ΤΗΣ ΕΛΛΑΔΟΣ).

Russian Sources

- (in Russian) 25 мая (12 мая). Православная Энциклопедия под редакцией Патриарха Московского и всея Руси Кирилла (электронная версия). (Orthodox Encyclopedia - Pravenc.ru).
- (in Russian) 12 мая (ст.ст.) 25 мая 2013 (нов. ст.). Русская Православная Церковь Отдел внешних церковных связей. (DECR).
