= John Kaloktenes =

12th-century Greek Metropolitan of Thebes

John the New Merciful
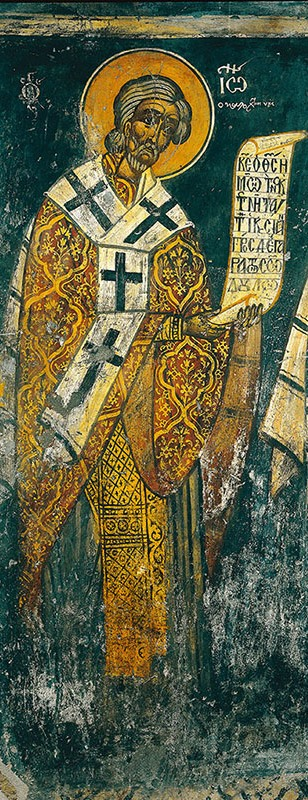

Metropolitan of Thebes
- Born: early 12th century Constantinople (modern-day Istanbul, Turkey)
- Died: c. 1190; Thebes, Greece
- Venerated in: Eastern Orthodox Church
- Feast: April 29
- Patronage: Thebes, Greece

John Kaloktenes (Greek: Ἰωάννης ὁ Καλοκτένης; fl. 1166–c. 1190) was a 12th-century Byzantine Metropolitan of Thebes. Known for his charitable works, he was declared a saint by the Eastern Orthodox Church, with the surname the New Merciful (ὁ Νέος Ἐλεήμων), and is commemorated on April 29.

== Life ==
John Kaloktenes was born in Constantinople to a well-to-do family. His parents, Constantine and Maria, are referred to in the sources as of noble descent and virtuous soul. The date of his birth is unknown, but since he was Metropolitan of Thebes in 1166, he must have been at least 30 years old, the minimum legal age for such an appointment. His childhood is unknown, but he is described as an excellent student with a pronounced inclination to theology and religious matters.

He initially became a monk in some monastery in Constantinople. Distinguishing himself through piety or ability, he was appointed to the See of Thebes by Patriarch Luke Chrysoberges. Kaloktenes is first attested as Metropolitan in the Church synod held at Constantinople in 1166, when he was likely also appointed to the position. This was a difficult assignment, as the city of Thebes and its see were at the time in considerable decline. A flourishing centre of the Byzantine silk industry and seat of the governor of the Theme of Hellas, the city had suffered after the Norman sack of 1147, when the silk weavers had been carried off to southern Italy. All five suffragan bishoprics of the metropolis—Kanala, Zaratova, Kaistorion, Trichia, and Platana—had been left vacant, leading to a worrisome decline in the religious sentiments of the local population. Therefore, in 1169 Kaloktenes appointed bishops to these sees, provoking the displeasure of Emperor Manuel I Komnenos (r. 1143–1180), as Kaloktenes had neglected informing the patriarchal synod. The synod at first declared Kaloktenes' appointments as uncanonical, but Kaloktenes' stauch and passionate defence of the necessity of his actions was eventually rewarded, as the synod relented and confirmed his appointments. As a result, he was able to participate in the synod at Constantinople in 1170 that condemned John Eirenikos.

As primate of Thebes, Kaloktenes led a simple and austere life, devoted to works of charity towards the poor and weak, and the strengthening of the Church. He established new churches and monasteries in and around the city, as well as a hospital, hospices for the elderly, poor, and travellers, and a school for the education of girls. He financed the diversion of the Isminos river to the Boeotian plain, thus ensuring the functioning of the twenty water mills that secured the local irrigation. As part of this work, he constructed an aqueduct with over twenty arches from 3 to 6 m high and 3.2 m wide, which survived until the early 20th century. From this, the river acquired the colloquial name Agiannis (Αγιάννης, "Saint John").

He remained in his position until his death c. 1190. For his charity, he was named "the New Merciful" (Νέος Ἐλεήμων), after the 7th-century Patriarch of Alexandria, John the Merciful, and canonized, becoming the patron saint of Thebes. He is commemorated on April 29.

== Sources ==
- Kardaras, Georgios (April 21, 2011). "Ιωάννης Καλοκτένης". Encyclopedia of the Hellenic World, Boeotia (in Greek). Foundation of the Hellenic World.
- Kazhdan, Alexander, ed. (1991). The Oxford Dictionary of Byzantium. Oxford and New York: Oxford University Press. ISBN 0-19-504652-8.
- Koder, Johannes; Hild, Friedrich (1976). Tabula Imperii Byzantini, Band 1: Hellas und Thessalia (in German). Vienna: Verlag der Österreichischen Akademie der Wissenschaften. ISBN 978-3-7001-0182-6.
