= April 28 (Eastern Orthodox liturgics) =

Day in the Eastern Orthodox liturgical calendar

Eastern Orthodox liturgical calendar
April 27	April 28	April 29
April 28 O.S. ≍ May 11 N.S. April 28 N.S ≍ April 15 O.S.

An Eastern Orthodox cross

April 28 in Eastern Orthodox liturgical calendars is a feast day and a day of commemoration of saints and martyrs. Although some Orthodox churches use the Revised Julian Calendar and others use the traditional Julian calendar, the fixed commemorations for their respective April 28 are broadly the same, no matter which calendar is used. (Note: Despite the dates being the same, the days to which they refer typically differ by 13 days. The notation Old Style or O.S. is sometimes used to indicate a date in the traditional Julian Calendar (the "Old Calendar"). The notation New Style or N.S. indicates a date in the Revised Julian calendar (the "New Calendar").)

== Saints ==
- Apostles Jason and Sosipater, of the Seventy, and their companions, at Corfu (1st century): (see also April 29 - Greek)

- Martyrs Saturninus, Jakischolus (Inischolus), Faustianus, Januarius, Marsalius, Euphrasius, Mammius - the holy seven former thieves;
- The virgin Cercyra, and Christodoulos the Ethiopian.

- Martyrs Zeno, Eusebius, Neon, and Vitalis, who were converted by Apostles Jason and Sosipater (c. 63) (see also April 29 - Greek)
- Nine martyrs at Cyzicus (c. 286-299): (see also April 29 - Slavic)
  - Theognes, Rufus, Antipater, Theostichus, Artemas, Magnus, Theodoulos, Thaumasius, and Philemon
- Martyrs Dada, Maximus, and Quintilian at Dorostolum (286) (see also: April 13, August 2)
- Martyr Tibald of Pannonia (304)
- Saint Auxibius II, Bishop of Soli, Cyprus (4th century) (Note: There is another Saint Auxibius (+102), whose feast day is on February 17.)
- Venerable Memnon the Wonderworker (6th century) (see also April 29 - Slavic)

== Pre-Schism Western saints ==
- Martyrs Aphrodisius, Caralippus, Agapius, and Eusebius (65) (Note: "The same day, the saints Aphrodisius, Caralippus, Agapius, and Eusebius, martyrs.") (see also May 30 - Greek)
- Saint Mark of Galilee, bishop and martyr (92) (Note: By tradition, a Galilean and the first bishop, and also martyr, of the Abruzzi in Italy.) (Note: "At Atino, St. Mark, who being made bishop by the blessed apostle Peter, was the first to preach the Gospel to the inhabitants of that region, and received the crown of martyrdom in the persecution of Domitian, under the governor Maximus.")
- Saint Artemius (Arthemius), Bishop of Sens (609)
- Saint Gerard the Pilgrim (c. 639) (Note: By tradition he was one of four pilgrims from England - the other three were Ardwine, Bernard and Hugh - they all reposed in Gallinaro in the south of Italy. Many scholars doubt their historicity.)
- Venerable Crónán, abbot of Roscrea, Ireland (640)
- Saint Pamphilus, Bishop of Sulmona and Corfinium (c. 700)
- Saint Prudentius, Bishop of Tarazona in Aragon (c. 700)
- Saint Adalbero, Bishop of Augsburg (909)

== Post-Schism Orthodox saints ==
- Saint Cyril of Turov, Bishop (1183)
- Saint Cyril, in the world Cyriacus, founder and abbot of Syrinsk Monastery, Kargopol (1st half of XVI)
- Venerable Isaiah of Onogošt, ascetic monk who lived in a cave which would later become Ostrog Monastery (end of XVI - beginning of XVII)

=== New martyrs and confessors ===
- Virgin-martyr Anna Shashkina, new martyr of Yaroslavl-Rostov (1940)

== Other commemorations ==
- The Miracle at Carthage (c. 610-641)
- Repose of Archimandrite Hilarion (Argatu) of Cernica (1999)
- Repose of Hieroschemamonk Dionysius (Ignat) of Kolitsou Skete, Mt. Athos (2004)

== Icon gallery ==
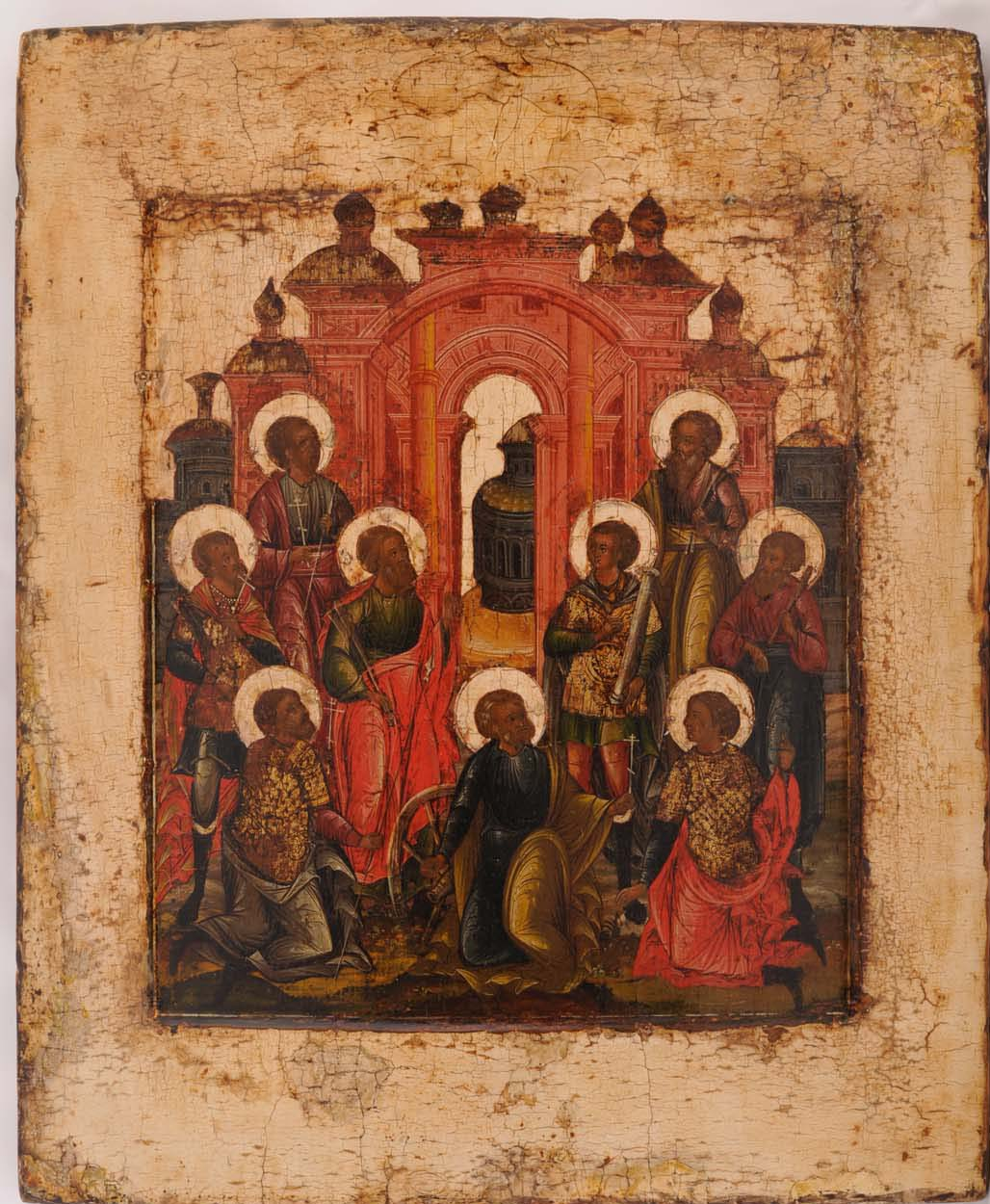
The Nine martyrs of Cyzicus.

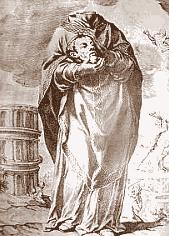
St. Aphrodisius.

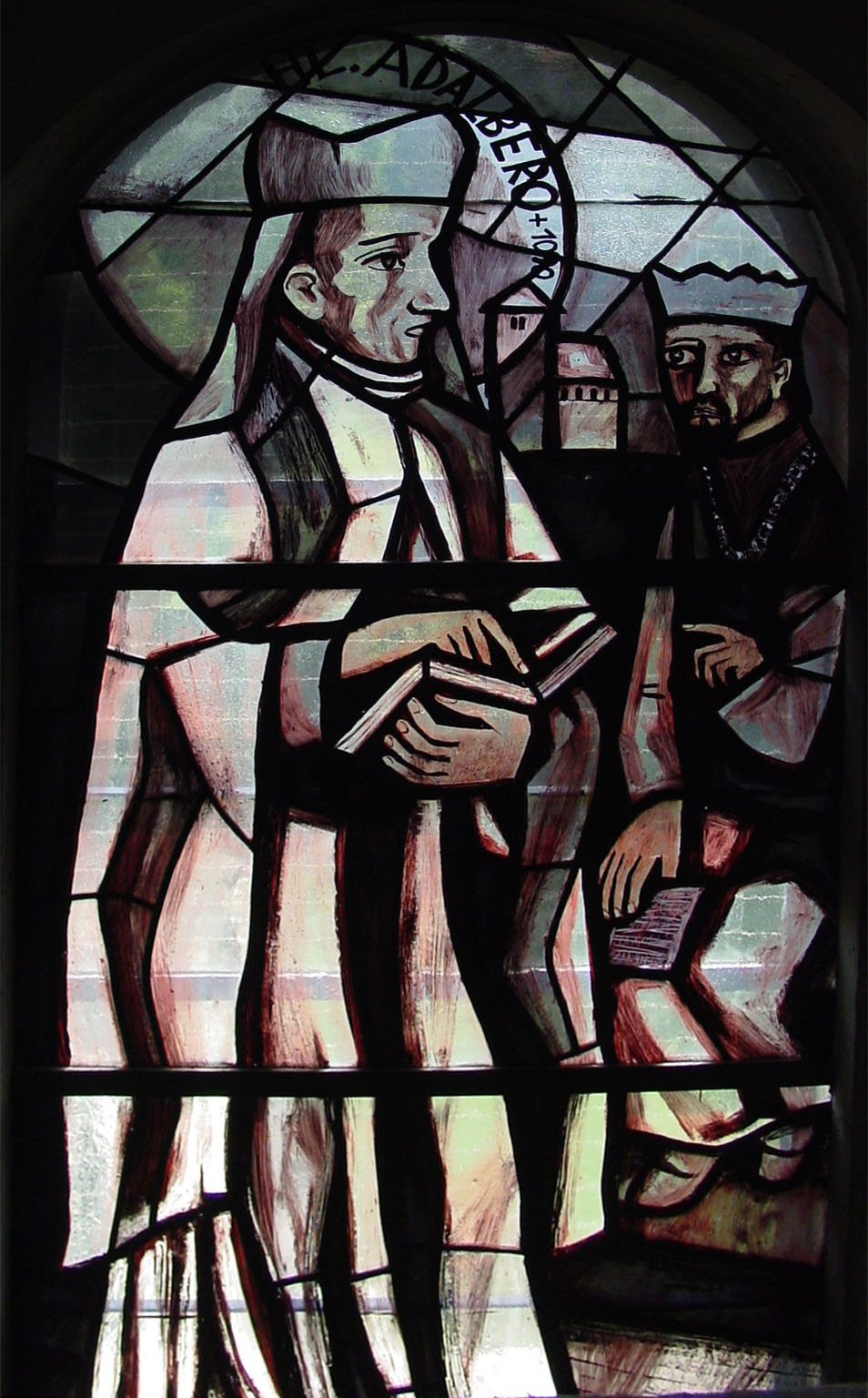
St. Adalbero, Bishop of Augsburg.

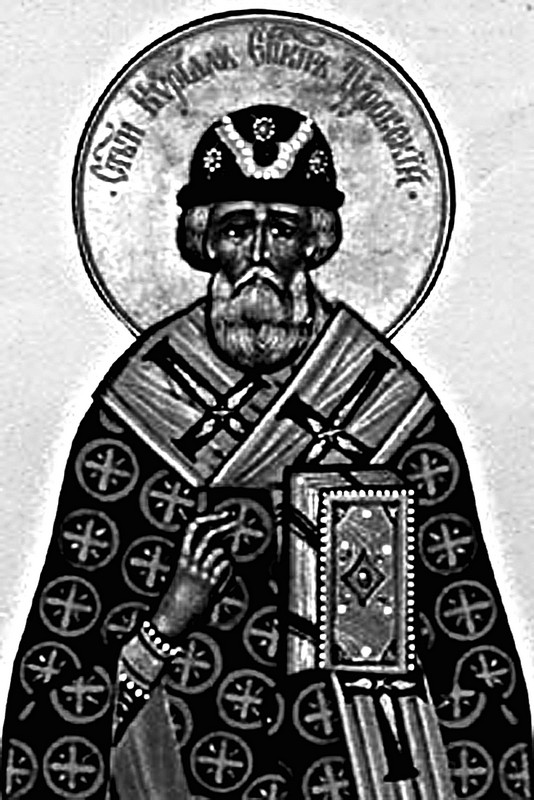
St. Cyril of Turov.

== Sources ==
- April 28/May 11. Orthodox Calendar (Pravoslavie.ru).
- May 11 / April 28. Holy Trinity Russian Orthodox Church (A parish of the Patriarchate of Moscow).
- April 28. Latin Saints of the Orthodox Patriarchate of Rome.
- The Roman Martyrology. Transl. by the Archbishop of Baltimore. Last Edition, According to the Copy Printed at Rome in 1914. Revised Edition, with the Imprimatur of His Eminence Cardinal Gibbons. Baltimore: John Murphy Company, 1916. pp. 119–120.
- Rev. Richard Stanton. A Menology of England and Wales, or, Brief Memorials of the Ancient British and English Saints Arranged According to the Calendar, Together with the Martyrs of the 16th and 17th Centuries. London: Burns & Oates, 1892. pp. 184–185.

Greek Sources

- Great Synaxaristes: (in Greek) 28 Απριλίου. Μέγας Συναξαριστής.
- (in Greek) Συναξαριστής. 28 Απριλίου. Ecclesia.gr. (H Εκκλησία της Ελλάδος).

Russian Sources

- (in Russian) 11 мая (28 апреля). Православная Энциклопедия под редакцией Патриарха Московского и всея Руси Кирилла (электронная версия). (Orthodox Encyclopedia - Pravenc.ru).
- (in Russian) 28 апреля (ст.ст.) 11 мая 2013 (нов. ст.). Русская Православная Церковь Отдел внешних церковных связей. (DECR).
