= Saint Memnon =

Egyptian hegumen

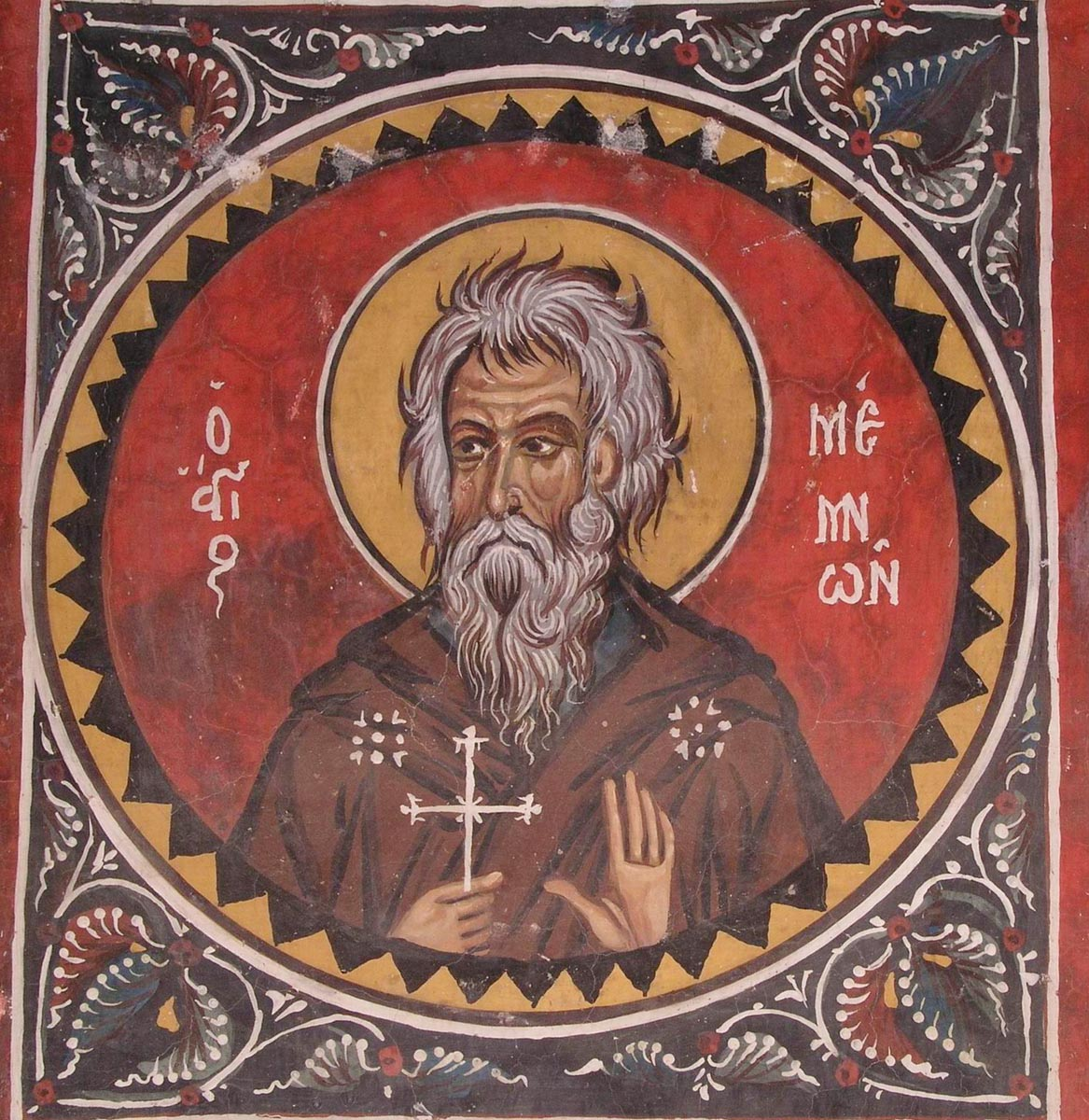
Saint Memnon

Saint Memnon the Wonderworker was alive during the second century A.D. He was a hegumen of an Egyptian monastery. His feast day is April 28 (Eastern Orthodox liturgics).

In the Egyptian desert he practised religious asceticism.

He is said to have performed a number of miracles. Some of his miracles include causing a spring to gush forth, destroying a plague of locusts, curing illnesses and saving boats from destruction.

== See also ==
- Saint Menas
- Temptation of Christ
