= Metropolis of Thebes and Livadeia =

See of the Church of Greece

The Metropolis of Thebes and Livadeia (Greek: Ιερά Μητρόπολις Θηβών και Λεβαδείας) is a metropolitan see of the Church of Greece in Boeotia, Greece. Since the Middle Ages it has also existed as a Roman Catholic titular see. The current metropolitan (since 2008) is Georgios Mantzouranis.

== History ==
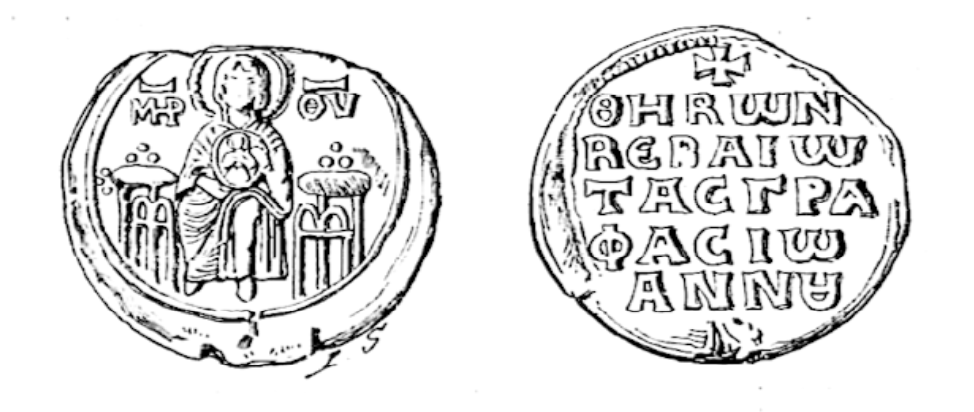
Seal of John, Metropolitan of Thebes, 10th/11th century

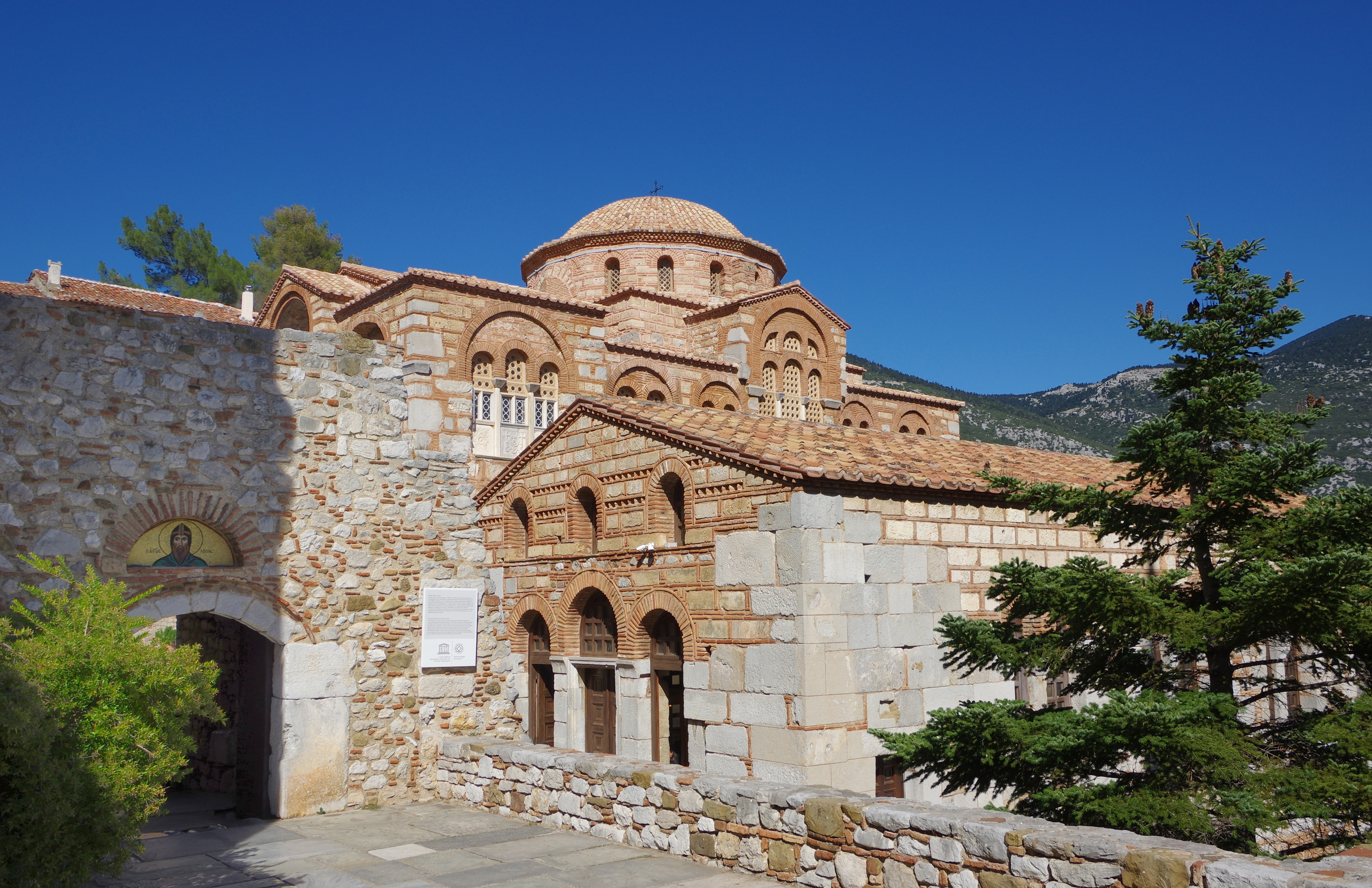
The 11th-century Hosios Loukas monastery in Boeotia, a UNESCO World Heritage Site

Christianity is said to have come to Boeotia with Apostle Paul and Luke the Evangelist in 56/57 AD, who are said to have installed the first local bishop, Saint Rufus. Luke spent much of his life in Boeotia and died there. He came to be regarded as the patron saint of Thebes, the capital of Boeotia, and his remains were interred in the city's cathedral.

The first attested bishop, Cleonicus, attended the First Council of Nicaea in 325. Le Quien also lists Julius at the Synod of Sardica in 344; Anysius at the Council of Ephesus in 431; Architimus in 458; Marcianus in 867. The history of the city and the bishopric in the early Byzantine period is obscure. However, based on the Notitiae Episcopatuum, the see had been elevated to an archbishopric by 906, possibly connected to the city becoming the capital of the theme of Hellas, occupying the 30th place among the archdioceses of the Patriarchate of Constantinople. By the 12th century, it had become a metropolitan see, numbering five suffragan sees ca. 1170. At this time, the see was headed by John Kaloktenes, who became a saint as "Saint John the New Merciful" due to his charitable works. In the late 13th century, the see ranked as 57th among the 110 metropolitan sees.

Following the Fourth Crusade, Thebes became the seat of a Latin Archbishop and a Franciscan custody. Following the Ottoman conquest in the mid-15th century, The Latin archbishopric became a titular see, vacant since 1965.

Under Ottoman rule, the Metropolis of Thebes ranked 37th among 72 metropolitan sees of the Patriarchate of Constantinople. By the early 18th century, however, it appears as a simple bishopric, and following Greek independence, it was renamed as the Bishopric of Thebes and Livadeia, with its seat at Livadeia, on 9 July 1852. Since 1922, the see was again promoted to a metropolis, covering three eparchies: Thebes, Livadeia, and Avlida. It currently has 130 parishes and 24 monasteries.
