= Isaiah of Onogošt =

Serbian Orthodox monk and saint

Saint Isaiah of Onogošt Исаија от Оногошта
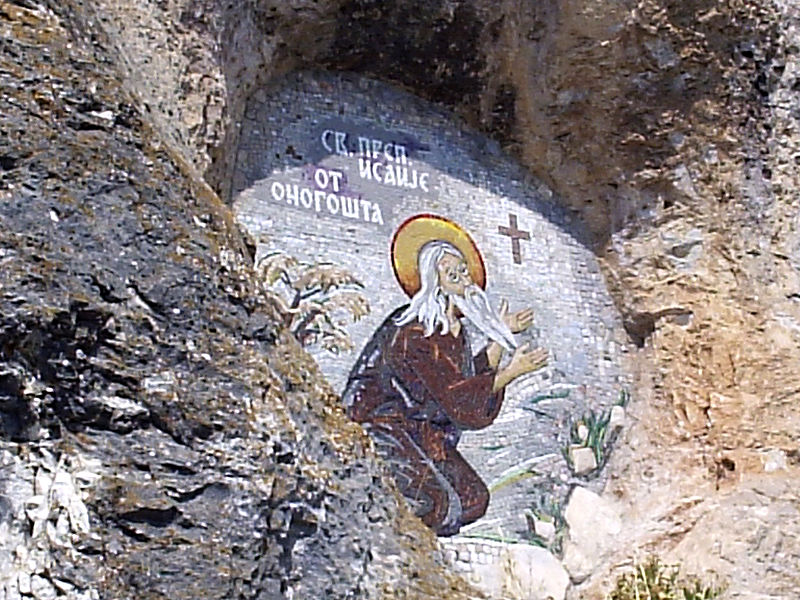
- Fresco of Saint Isaiah on a rock at Ostrog

Venerable
- Born: late 16th century Popi, Ottoman Empire (now modern-day Montenegro)
- Died: early 17th century Ostrog Monastery, Ottoman Empire (now modern-day Montenegro)
- Venerated in: Eastern Orthodox Church
- Feast: 11 May [O.S. 28 April]
- Attributes: Vested as a monk, praying in a kneeling position

Isaiah of Onogošt (Serbian Cyrillic: Исаија от Оногошта), also known as Isaiah of Ostrog (Serbian Cyrillic: Исаија Острошки) was a Serbian Orthodox monk and ascetic who lived in a cave located on the site of the future Ostrog monastery between the late 16th and early 17th centuries. He is venerated as a saint in the Eastern Orthodox Church, with his feast day being commemorated on 11 May [O.S. 28 April].

== Biography ==
Very little is known about the life of Saint Isaiah. It is preserved that he was born in the village of Popi, near Nikšić, and that he became a monk and retreated into the rocky highlands of Ostrog, likely fleeing Ottoman occupation. Once there, he built a small church which he dedicated to the entry of the Most Holy Theotokos into the temple, where he would remain until his death. Soon after, the Turks burned his relics at Planinica between Ostrog and Nikšić in an attempt to suppress the veneration of him as a saint.

== Legacy ==
Basil of Ostrog would later choose the sight of Saint Isaiah's hermitage to build the Ostrog Monastery, where Isaiah's grandson would become a hieromonk, taking his grandfather's name. On an inscription at the church of the Holy Cross at Ostrog, Saint Isaiah is mentioned as the "Holy and Venerable Father of ours Isaiah of the village of Popi''.

The first service dedicated to Saint Isaiah was held on 11 May 2015 during the consecration of a small chapel dedicated to him at the Upper Ostrog monastery, where regular services to him have been held every year since.
