= Saint Ava =

Roman Catholic saint

Saint Ava was a Benedictine abbess and is a Roman Catholic saint. Ava is commemorated on April 29; she is a patron saint of the blind.

== Life ==
The niece of Pepin II of Aquitaine, she was born on April 29, 845. She was cured of blindness by the abbess-saint Ragenfredis (French Renfroie). Ava then gave her fortune to the Church and became a Benedictine nun and, later, abbess of her monastery in the County of Hainaut, now in Belgium.
