= Kirill of Turov =

Belarusian Eastern Orthodox bishop and saint

Saint Saint Kirill of Turov
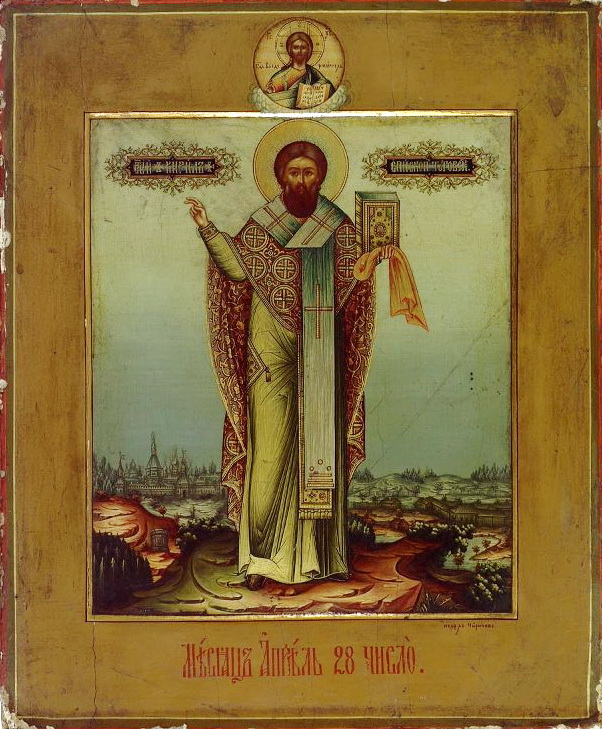
- Kirill of Turov
- Born: 1130
- Died: 1182
- Venerated in: Eastern Orthodox Church, Greek Catholic Churches
- Feast: 28 April

Cyril of Turov, alternately Kirill of Turov (Church Slavonic: Кѷриллъ Туровськiй, romanized: Kürīllǔ Turovsǐkij, Belarusian: Кірыла Тураўскі, romanized: Kiryła Turawski, Russian: Кири́лл Ту́ровский, romanized: Kirill Turovskiy; 1130–1182) was a bishop and saint of the Russian Orthodox Church. He was one of the first and finest theologians of Kievan Rus'; he lived in Principality of Turov, now southern Belarus. His feast day in the Eastern Orthodox Church is on 28 April.

== Cyril of Turov ==
For centuries Cyril of Turov enjoyed considerable prestige as a writer; his works were continuously copied and imitated. According to Zenkovsky's assessment of Cyril's heritage: "Cyril, Bishop of Turov, was probably the most accomplished master of Orthodox theology and the Byzantine style of writing. He had an excellent command of Greek and his literary achievements surpass those of any other Russian man of letters of that era ... Of all his works, Cyril's sermon with the triumphant description of spring as the symbol of the Resurrection was the most popular." Indeed, this sermon is one of his best known works in which he creates some of his more compelling images like a simile comparing the melting of ice in the spring and Thomas's dissolving doubts about Christ's resurrection: "Ныне зима греховнаа покаянием престала есть и лед невериа богоразумием растаяся... лед же Фомина невериа показанием Христов ребр растаяся." [Today the winter of sin has stopped in repentance, and the ice of unbelief is melted by wisdom spring appears...] It is often emphasized that Kirill was an accomplished author who exerted influence on subsequent generations of East Slavs (continuing through the 17th century). The question of Kirill's heritage is problematic to some degree. First of all, there is the problem with the historically verifiable existence of Kirill of Turov; the questions as to whether he ever existed and who he might have been have not been answered definitively.

== Biographic details ==
Biographic details are scant and because none come from sources contemporary with Kirill, many are debated. All we have in terms of his biography is a short Synaxarion Life: Life of Kirill of Turov (28 April) which was written no earlier than the mid-13th century. This terse formulaic composition draws heavily on the hagiographic conventions and yields very few historical details. He was born in a thriving town of Turov, the son of wealthy parents. He was characterized by extreme piety at a young age and he entered a monastery still a young man. In the monastery he was respected for his asceticism and his learned interpretation of biblical texts. He was consecrated bishop of Turov in 1158. With the support of the Metropolitan in 1169 he became involved in deposing Fedor, who occupied the bishopric of Rostov. Usually he is thought to have died in 1182. According to an alternative line of thought, he became a bishop after 1182, remaining a monk throughout the period of the 1160s and 1170s. Even the dates of Kirill's life and work are debated. The dates 1130-1182 had been commonly accepted but among notable scholars, Simon Franklin vigorously disputes them. Kirill's title the Bishop of Turov is usually agreed to be a later invention arising out of a desire to designate an appropriately high status to the author of extremely popular and influential words. Even though Kirill came to be known as the Bishop of Turov his works deal most extensively with a theme of monasticism. It is often emphasized that Kirill's points of reference are located within the walls of the monastery. Monks are Kirill's most frequent addressees.

== Alternative names and attributions ==
Generally, Kirill's autographs are not available and the manuscript sources are separated from the assumed time of composition by centuries. The medieval habit of anonymity and pseudonymity further complicates the process of attribution. Apart from the very rare "Kirill of Turov" (even when this designation occurs, it tends to be just one of several variant readings), the headings in 'his' manuscripts include "Kirill the monk," "Kirill the philosopher," "Saint Kirill," "The Blessed father Kirill," "the blessed monk Kirill," "Kirill the unworthy monk," "the venerable Kirill." Given this variety of labels, 'Kirill's' texts invite several candidates for being their more likely authors (writers whose existence has been substantiated with historical facts). Hypothetically, each work can be allocated to one of several real Kirills and Cyrils: Cyril of Jerusalem (ca. 315-386); Cyril of Alexandria (d. 444); Cyril of Scythopolis (mid-sixth century); Konstantin-Cyril, apostle of the Slavs(d. 869); Metropolitan Kirill I of Kiev (1223–1233); Metropolitan Kirill II of Kiev (1243–1290); Bishop Kirill of Rostov (1231–1262); Kirill of Turov. There are also numerous Kirills who may have been active but were not recorded by chroniclers and hagiographers. Matters are further complicated by the fact, that these labels appear to have been used interchangeably as Simon Franklin points out.

== Works ==
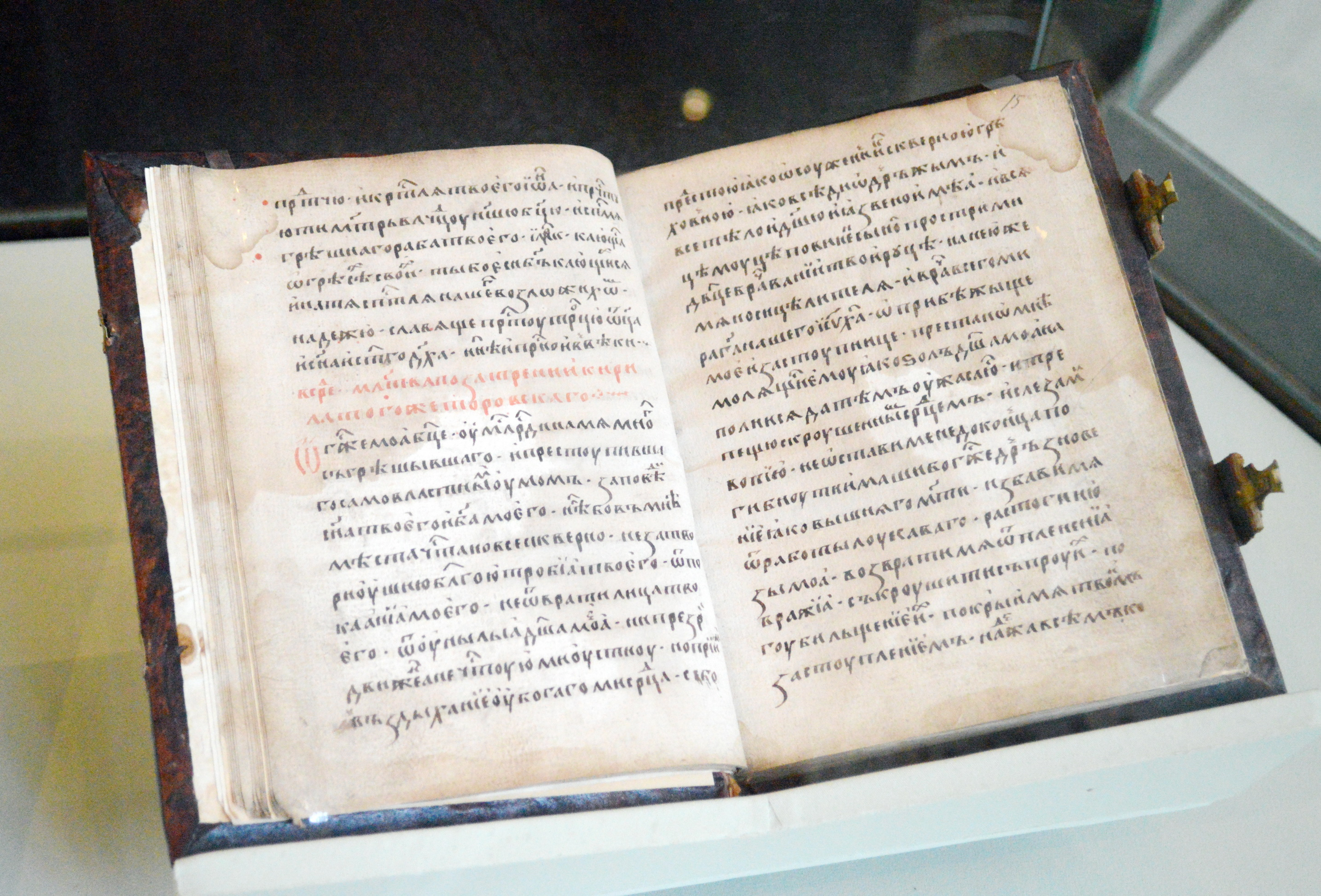
Prayer book by Kirill of Turov, 16th century manuscript

Questions of authorship notwithstanding, a remarkable corpus of works in different genres has been attributed to Kirill of Turov: festal homilies, monastic commentaries, some letters, and a cycle of prayers, other hymnological texts, several versions of a penitential Prayer Canon, a Canon of Olga and an abecedarian prayer. These works constitute what came to be known as Corpus Cyrillianium (which at its core has only eleven works which are agreed by the majority to be by Kirill of Turov.)

This is a 19th-century consensus which is generally assumed but continuously questioned. In manuscript sources, there are 23 prayers attributed to Kirill, as well as an additional nine unattributed prayers that are regularly copied together as a group. The prayers form a seven-day liturgical cycle. His homilies are also a cycle based on the ecclesiastical calendar from Palm Sunday to the Sunday before Pentecost. His allegorical commentaries are directed at a monastic audience.

As a scholar of Kyrill, C.M. MacRobert summarizes the state of scholarship: "Even if further early copies of the texts attributed to Kirill of Turov come to light, it may well not be possible to reconstruct his kanon in the form in which he wrote it—supposing that he did write it—or to determine the original wording of his prayers. The attempt to establish a canon of his liturgical works may ultimately be vain: what we have to deal with is not necessarily the recognizable oeuvre of one man, but rather a devotional tradition, a profoundly penitential spirituality which was cultivated among the East Slavs during the medieval period and taken up by other Orthodox Slavs under the pressure of social and political vicissitudes." Another problem that complicates any precise attribution is the traditionalism of the Corpus Cyrillianum and the genre itself. The Kirillic genres themselves are deliberately constructed so as to give an impression of timelessness and universality. Details of contemporary "relevance" yielding specific clues as to time, place, and people (like Kirill's admonition of Feodorek – Bishop Fedor of Rostov called so in depreciation) are rare and skillfully disguised. Kirill-the author identifies himself as a humble monk (following the tradition of humility topos) who fades before the ultimate author and authority of God. Here is an example of Kyrill's humility topos taken from "A Tale of a layman, and on monasticism, and on the soul, and on repentance"; by the most sinful monk Kirill, for Vasilij, abbot of the Caves: "(52) And me: I beg you, do not spurn me like a dog, but remember me even here in your prayers, and there throw me scraps from that holy table, and may all Christians be judged worthy of that life, through Jesus Christ our Lord, to whom glory with the Father and with the Holy Spirit, now and ever." And another one from: A Sermon for Low Sunday by the unworthy monk Kirill in praise of the resurrection, and concerning the paschal bread, and concerning Thomas's resting of the Lord's ribs: "(1) The Church requires a great teacher and a wise interpreter to adorn the feast. But we are poor in word and dim in mind, and we lack the fire of the Holy Spirit to compose words to benefit the soul. Yet, for the love of the brethren that are with me, I shall say a few words concerning the renewal of the resurrection of Christ."

== Style: Kirill's traditionalism ==
Most Kievan Rus' literature is based on the Eastern Christian tradition which came to Rus' from Byzantium via Slavonic translations originating mainly in Bulgaria. "The homiletic and exegetic genres are among the 'purest' versions of the rhetorical tradition inherited from Byzantium, relatively uncontaminated in language and structure," as Franklin affirms. These genres within the tradition of Christian rhetoric became Kievan elite culture, eagerly imitated by Rus' medieval authors who "played the game according to received rules". The Byzantines also valued the stability of form and expression-the impression of timelessness. Consequently, in creating their native tradition, Kievan writers drew on the "tradition one of whose higher aesthetic virtues was traditionalism itself". As Franklin sees it, Kirill's "self-imposed task was to perpetuate a tradition, not to change or modernize it; to become authoritative by following authority rather than by challenging it".

Kirill's works are not original in form because they closely follow the Byzantine style. In content it relies heavily on quotes from the Holy Texts. Kirill's texts are characterized by their extreme citationality. Simon Franklin in his most current English translation of the sermons numbers about 370 biblical quotation and allusions. Further textual sources for almost all of Kirill's works are also identified. They are works by early Christian and Byzantine churchmen that would have been available to Kirill in Slavonic translations: John Chrysostom, Epiphanius of Salamis, Ephrem of Syrus, Gregory of Nazianzus, Eusebius of Caesarea, and the scholia of Nicetas of Heraclea, Titus of Bostra, Theophylact of Ohrid, and the chronicler George the monk (George Hamartolus). As Ingunn Lunde points out, Kirill's technique of quotations is based on the convention of the epideictic discourse where the establishment of verbal correspondences and parallels through emphasis and amplification serve to invocation of the authority of the sacred texts. "What is essential is the recognition of certain layer of sacred texts or voice in the orators' discourse". If we accept the conventional attributions of works to Kyrill of Turov, he can be justly named the most prolific extant writer of Kievan Rus'.

== Churches named after St. Cyril ==
There are several Belarusian Orthodox churches named after St. Cyril in Belarus, including, among others:

- Church of the Holy Bishop Cyril of Turov at the Cathedral House (Minsk, Russian Orthodox)
- Cathedral of St. Bishops Cyril of Turov and Lawrence of Turov (Turau, Russian Orthodox)
- Church of the Holy Bishop Cyril of Turov (Svietlahorsk, Russian Orthodox)

Besides that, several notable Orthodox and Greek Catholic churches of the Belarusian diaspora are named after St. Cyril of Turaŭ:

- Church of St Cyril of Turau and All the Patron Saints of the Belarusian People (London, Belarusian Greek Catholic)
- St. Cyril of Turau Cathedral (Brooklyn, Belarusian Autocephalous Orthodox)
- Church of St. Cyril of Turau (Toronto, Belarusian Autocephalous Orthodox)
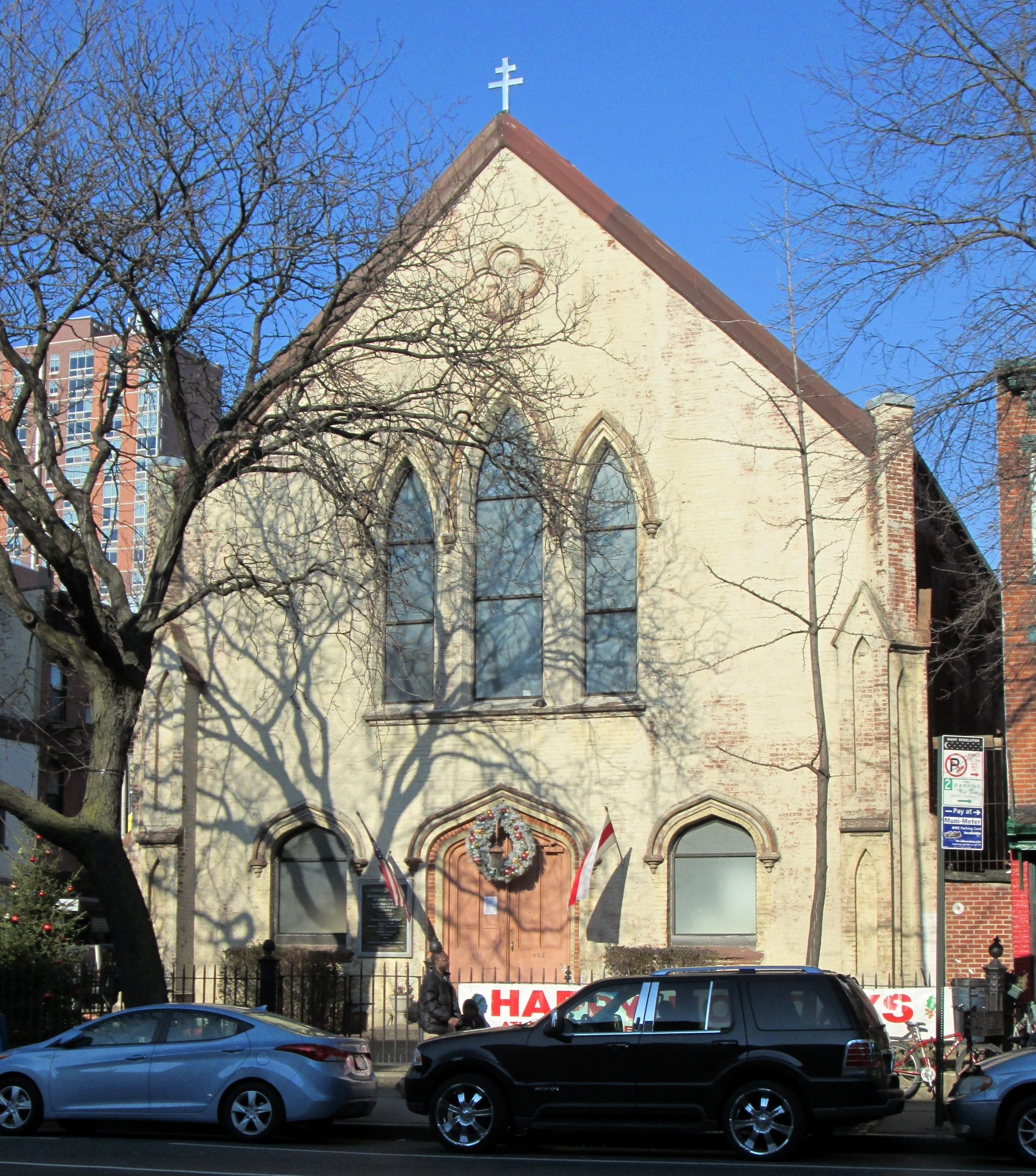
Cathedral of St. Cyril of Turau, New York

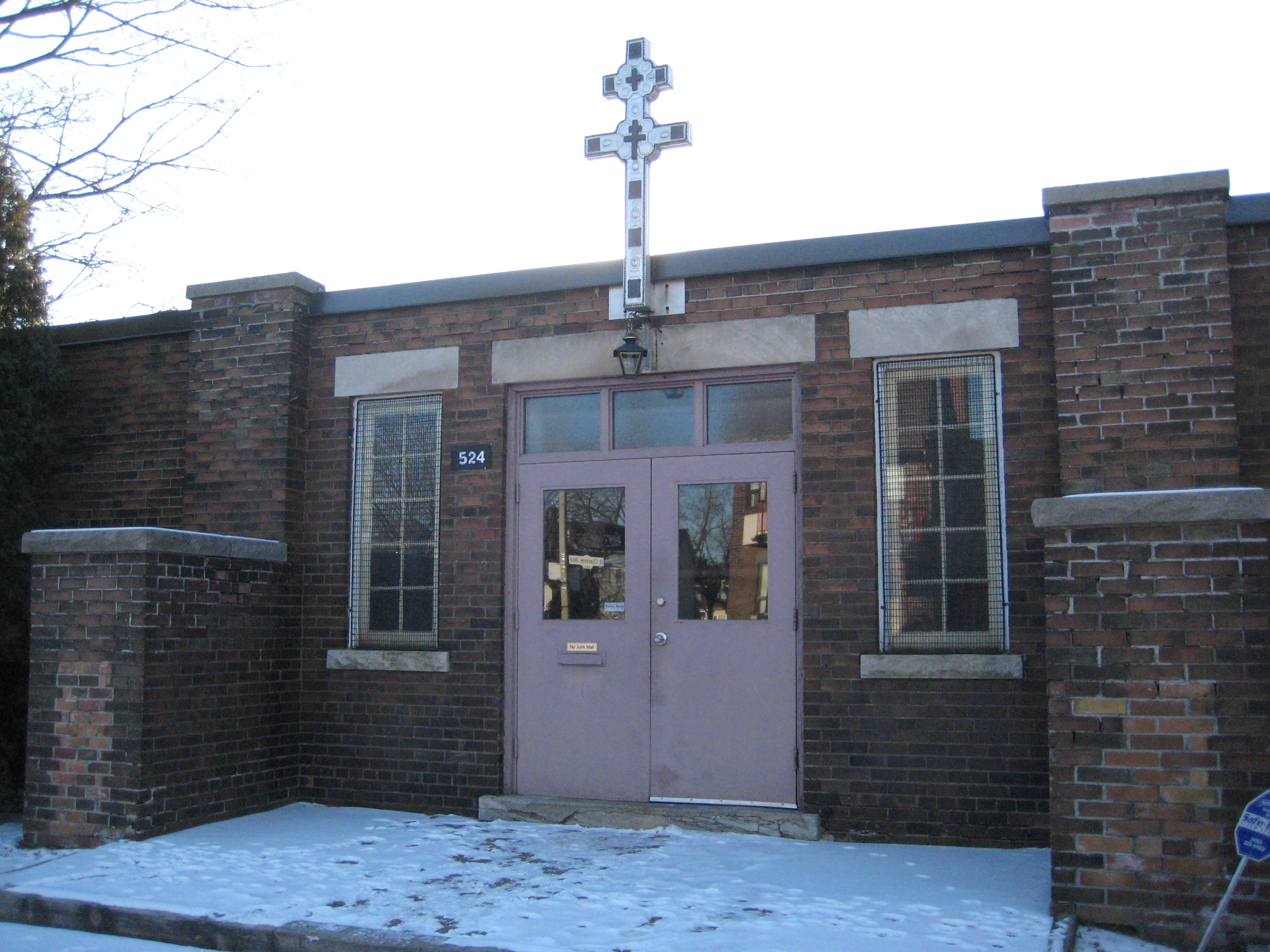
Church of St. Cyril of Turau, Toronto

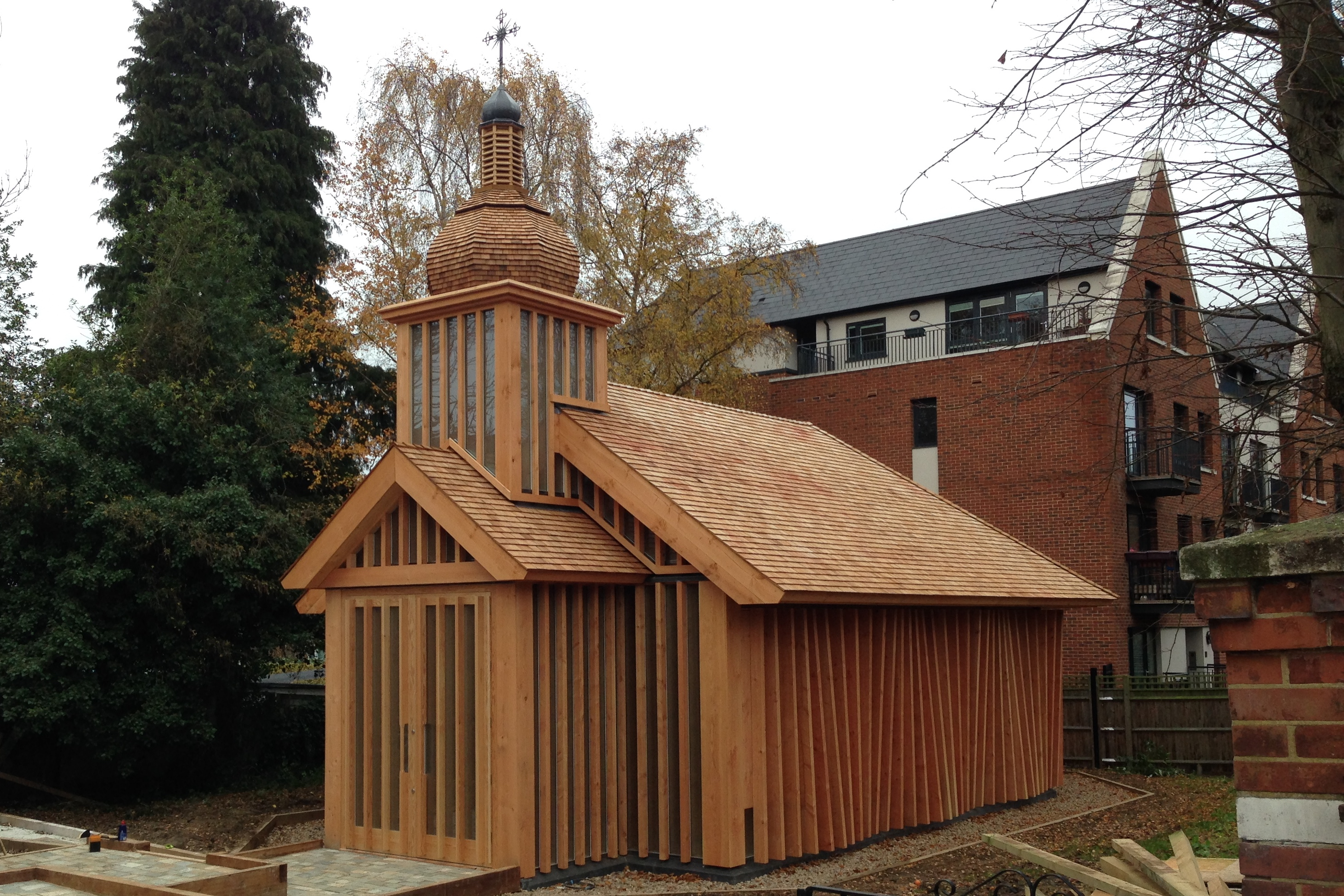
Church of St Cyril of Turau and All the Patron Saints of the Belarusian People, London
