= Jeffrey Mailhot =

American serial killer (born 1970)

Jeffrey S. Mailhot
- Mailhot in 2004
- Born: November 9, 1970 (age 55); Woonsocket, Rhode Island, U.S
- Other name: "Rhode Island Ripper"
- Status: Incarcerated
- Convictions: Murder (x3); Assault (x2)
- Penalty: Two consecutive life sentences + 10 years

Details
- Span of crimes: 2003–2004
- Country: United States
- State: Rhode Island
- Target: Prostitutes
- Killed: 3
- Injured: 2
- Date apprehended: July 17, 2004
- Imprisoned at: Rhode Island Maximum Security Prison

Jeffrey S. Mailhot (born November 9, 1970), also known as The Rhode Island Ripper, is an American serial killer who murdered three prostitutes in Woonsocket, Rhode Island, between 2003 and 2004. After strangling his victims to death, Mailhot dismembered their corpses with a saw, placed them in garbage bags, and threw them in dumpsters. After one of his victims survived, Mailhot was arrested on July 17, 2004, and later sentenced to three life terms in prison. Only the remains of one victim have been found.

== Early life ==
Jeffrey Mailhot was born on November 9, 1970. After graduating from Woonsocket High School, he got a job at a paper mill and moved into a first-floor apartment in downtown Woonsocket. Prior to his convictions for the murders, Mailhot had no criminal history. Locals described him as quiet and polite.

== Murders ==
In February 2003, Mailhot picked up Audrey L. Harris, a 33-year-old sex worker, outside of a laundromat. After driving her to his apartment, he strangled her to death as soon as they walked inside. Not knowing what to do next, he kept Harris' body in his apartment for a day and a half, until he got an idea from The Sopranos. After watching an episode where an antagonist of the show gets murdered and dismembered in a bath tub, Mailhot bought a bow saw at a hardware store. He then drove back to his apartment, put Harris' corpse in his bathtub and proceeded to dismember it with the saw. He then bagged the remains and the saw and threw them in dumpsters in Woonsocket and the surrounding communities. Harris' mother taped missing person posters of her on utility poles after her disappearance.

14 months later, in April 2004, Mailhot murdered 42-year-old sex worker Christine C. Dumont. Following the same pattern as the previous murder, he picked her up in his car, strangled her to death in his apartment, dismembered her, and discarded her remains in dumpsters.

In July 2004, Mailhot murdered Stacie K. Goulet, a 24-year-old sex worker, after picking her up from a Fourth of July fireworks show at a local park. He then dismembered her body and disposed of her remains.

== Arrest ==
In June 2004, Mailhot, searching for another victim, picked up Jocelin Martel, a then 27-year-old prostitute, outside of the Thundermist health center. When they arrived at his apartment, she asked, "do you want to go to your room or the living room?" As she turned in the opposite direction, he began to choke her. However, Martel headbutted him and poked him in the eye, causing him to stumble back. She took the opportunity to escape. The woman did not report the incident to the police, but law enforcement found out about the altercation after an anonymous male called a tip line and stated, "police might want to talk to Jocelin Martel." Although Martel did not know the name of Mailhot, police figured out his identity from the description she gave of his apartment. She also later identified him through a photograph. Police also connected another surviving victim to Mailhot. The woman previously wrote a criminal complaint accusing him of attacking her.

On July 17, 2004, police arrested Mailhot on the steps to his home. A few hours later, he confessed to the murders and other assaults during his interrogation. During his confession, Mailhot appeared remorseful. He claimed to have committed the murders because he enjoyed trapping his victims. He also claimed that he was glad that he got caught, because "he knew he wasn't going to be able to stop". During a search of his apartment, investigators found blood belonging to Dumont and Harris in Mailhot's bath tub. They also found the saw used to dismember Goulet. Furthermore, police tracked down surveillance footage of Mailhot buying the saw at Lowe's. Wishing to find the remains of the victims, investigators traced the locations of the dumpsters that the victims were discarded in. From this, they searched a landfill in Johnston for 10 days until they located the remains of Goulet. However, police were unable to find the remains of the other two victims.

== Legal proceedings ==
Mailhot was charged with three counts of first degree murder, one count of assault with the intent to commit murder, and one count of felony assault. On February 16, 2006, he pleaded guilty to all five counts and was sentenced to two terms of life imprisonment plus ten years. He now resides at the Rhode Island Maximum security prison in Cranston. Mailhot will be eligible for parole in 2047, when he is 77.

== In media ==
=== Literature ===
Rosencrance, Linda (2010). Ripper. Pinnacle Books. ISBN 9780786026319.

=== Television ===
The crimes of Jeffrey Mailhot were covered on season one, episode six, of Oxygen's true crime documentary series Twisted Killers.
