= René Mailhot =

Canadian journalist

René Mailhot (1942/43 – April 28, 2007) was a Canadian journalist from the province of Quebec. He began his career at the age of twenty with the French-language newspaper Le Droit, published in Ottawa. Afterwards, Mailhot went into public television in Moncton, New Brunswick.

While working with Radio-Canada during the FLQ October Crisis Mailhot was arrested and beaten twice by police officers.

Mailhot became noted for the public affairs programs Le 60 (The 60) and Télémag during the 1970s. He was in journalism in print, on television and on the radio. He appeared on the programs Indicatif présent (Present Indicative) and Sans frontière (Without Frontiers), where he displayed and explained geopolitical maps. He specialized in popular science and international relations. Michel Désautels said of him, "He had the knack for making complex things simple."

Mailhot traveled extensively throughout the world. He visited a total of more than 100 countries, including those in Africa, Asia and the Middle East. He reported on many major events, including the breakdown of the USSR, the fall of the Berlin Wall, the civil war in Mozambique, apartheid in South Africa, and the Islamic Revolution in Iran. On the local level, he was active during the October crisis in Quebec. He also observed the divergence between René Lévesque and Pierre Bourgault, two of the most prominent supporters of Quebec independence. He later became the international relations specialist at Radio-Canada.

Mailhot also directed the magazine Le trente (The Thirty), served as president of the Professional Journalists Federation of Quebec as well as the founder of the Press Council of Quebec.

He died from pneumonia on April 28, 2007, aged 64.
