= Cyprien Tanguay =

French Canadian priest and historian (1819-1902)

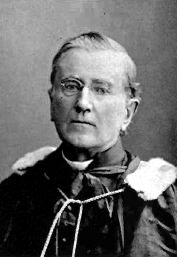
- Born: 15 September 1819; Quebec City, Lower Canada
- Died: 28 April 1902 (aged 82); Ottawa, Ontario, Canada
- Occupations: Roman Catholic priest, author, statistician
- Known for: Genealogical works authored, especially his multi-volume Dictionnaire

Cyprien Tanguay (15 September 1819 – 28 April 1902) was a French Canadian priest and historian.

== Biography ==
He was born in Quebec on September 15, 1819 and died on April 2, 1902. He attended elementary school in Quebec and he was enrolled at College de Sainte-Anne-de-la-Pocatiere for he secondary education but left after only three months. He then attended Petit Seminaire de Quebec and graduated in 1839. He was ordained on May 14, 1843.

The first twenty-two years of his priesthood were devoted to parochial work, especially at Rimouski, where he greatly contributed to the foundation of the future diocesan seminary. His early taste for genealogical studies fully manifested itself after his official appointment to the Agriculture, Immigration, and Statistics Ministry,(1865). His whole time was henceforth spent in genealogical research compilation based largely on in-situ consultation of catholic parish registers throughout Quebec, the Maritime provinces, Ontario, and the old French settlements in the United States. He also twice visited Europe for the same purpose. As the result of his labours he published (1871–90) his Dictionnaire généalogique des familles canadiennes françaises depuis les origines de la colonie jusqu'à nos jours, comprising seven large double column volumes of over six hundred pages: a colossal undertaking, fit for a numerous body of collaborators, which he achieved alone. Although he was unable to realize the latter part of his program entirely and many inaccuracies have crept into his work, yet on the whole it is highly reliable and almost unique. Every French Canadian by completing from contemporary registers the information supplied by this dictionary can proudly trace back his genealogy to his ancestors from old France. It has proved valuable for the discovery of canonical impediments to marriage through relationship, and has given birth to a copious genealogical literature of less comprehensiveness. In recognition of his labours the author received a prelature from Leo XIII (1887). He also published Répertoire du clergé canadien-français (1868) and A travers les registres (1886).

== Tanguay's Works ==
- Tanguay, Cyprien (1868), Répertoire Général du Clergé Canadien par ordre chronologique depuis la fondation de la colonie jusqu’à nos jours, Québec, C. Darveau, Imprimeur-éditeur, 321 pp.
- Tanguay, Cyprien (1871-1890). Dictionnaire Généalogique des Familles Canadiennes (DGFC) depuis la fondation de la colonie jusqu’à nos jours Montréal (Canada), Eusèbe Senécal et fils, Imprimeurs-éditeurs :
  - Volume I (1871), 1608-1700, 623 pp. [ABEL to ZAPAGLIA].
  - Volume II (1886), 1700-1760, 622 pp, [ABEL to CHAPUY].
  - Volume III (1887), 1700-1760, 607 pp. [CHARBONNEAU to EZIÉRO].
  - Volume IV (1887), 1700-1760, 608 pp. [FABAS to JININE].
  - Volume V (1888) 1700-1760, 608 pp. [JOACHIM to MERCIER].
  - Volume VI (1889) 1700-1760, 608 pp. [MERCIN to ROBIDOUX].
  - Volume VII (1890) 1700-1760, 688 pp. [ROBILLARD to ZISEUSE].
- Tanguay, Cyprien (1885), Monseigneur De Lauberivière, cinquième évêque de Québec 1739-1740, Documents annotés, Montréal, Eusèbe Senécal et fils, 159 p.
- Tanguay, Cyprien (1886), À travers les registres, Montréal, Librairie Saint-Joseph, 276 pp.
- Tanguay, Cyprien (1893), Répertoire Général du Clergé Canadien par ordre chronologique depuis la fondation de la colonie jusqu’à nos jours, Montréal, Eusèbe Senécal et fils, Imprimeur, 526 pp.

L'abbé Cyprien Tanguay, Roman Catholic priest and genealogist, is the author of the DGFC Dictionnaire of French-Canadian families. A plaque marks the site of the house in which he lived in the Lower Town area of Ottawa not far from the National Art Gallery and the Byward Market.

Tanguay's original research and extensive publications placed French-Canadian genealogy on a solid footing, which has proven a great benefit not only to French Canadians but to the millions of Canadians and Americans and others who have one or more French-Canadian ancestors.

His DGFC Dictionnaire contains many errors and some unsupported speculation about incomplete marriages.

The DGFC Dictionnaire is a fundamental reference work for French-Canadian genealogy. Its seven volumes, containing more than 4,350 pages, have been published in a facsimile edition by Élysées Éditions in 1975, with a bonus volume by Abbé Tanguay's À travers les registres, also available on CD-ROM format. The CD contains Tanguay's DGFC Dictionnaire and the following other important works : Joseph-Arthur Leboeuf's 600-page Complément a Tanguay, Tanguay's 276-page A travers les registres and Tanguay's 526-page Repertoire général du clergé canadien. Tanguay's work has been supplemented by the research and publications of others, including by Leboeuf, as above, and Abbé Archange Godbout's Origine des familles canadiennes-françaises, but was not supplanted until a century later. It contains over 2,000,000 births, deaths and marriages with other notes covering the period from the founding of New France to the early 19th century.

== DGFC Dictionnaire's influence ==
René Jetté summarizes Tanguay’s contribution along the following three dimensions :

- Tanguay was the starting point of an autonomous genealogical production, independent of jurists or historians;
- He believed every person has ancestors, not just a titled minority;
- He believed that genealogy is established only on evidence

DGFC Dictionnaire user utilisation over time has evolved to include:

- An American reprinting in 1969 by Arms Press.
- The Québecois reprinting in 1975 by Elysée.
- The CD-ROM format available from Originis in 2001.
- More recent internet availability including in terms of very recently making Tanguay's major works available via Bibliothèque et Archives nationales du Québec.

The Québec-based Institut généalogique Drouin's founder, Joseph Drouin, first established in 1917 a commercial-basis genealogical service that included its Dictionnaire national des Canadiens français (1608-1760), which was based on Tanquay's Dictionnaire, this work being carried by his son Gabriel in 1937. In the late 1950s, the Institut developed its own dictionary based on parish registers, which was indexed to allow quick, efficient research.

Such genealogical innovations as developed by the Institut likely prompted the Franciscan priest Archange Godbout to found in 1943 the Société généalogique canadienne-française, the first such Québec genealogical society based in Montreal. Today the Fédération québécoise des sociétés de généalogie now includes 70 member genealogical societies, none of whom however have a national-scope genealogical dictionary.

In terms of worthy successor to Tanguay's Dictionnaire, French-Canadian genealogy had to wait until 1983 for René Jetté to come up with his Dictionnaire généalogique des familles du Québec des origines à 1730, which is based on Montréal University PRDH's (Programme de recherche en démographie historique) Répertoire des actes de baptême, mariage, sépulture et des recensements du Québec ancien. In 2002, Jetté's PRDH colleague Bertrand Desjardins made available the Gaëtan Morin Éditeur CD-ROM Dictionnaire généalogique du Québec ancien des origines à 1765.

In 2013, the Institut généalogique Drouin (bought out by Jean-Pierre Pepin in 1997 or 1999) entered into a partnership with Montréal University's PRDH and BALSAC project's UQAC, Laval et McGill universities to ensure full indexing and diffusion of Institut's LAFRANCE database of Québec civil vital statistic records in the XIXth century.

In his examination of L'Ancêtre articles published over the last 18 years since publication of his 2019 article referenced here, Fortier found that Tanguay's Dictionnaire was cited in 10% of articles, that is, far behind Jetté's 41% and PRDH's 49%.

Thus it is only in recent years that Cyprien Tanguay's Dictionnaire was substantially rehabilitated.

== Bibliography ==
- Allaire, Abbé J.-B.-A. (1905), Dictionnaire biographique du clergé canadien-français, Les Anciens, Agriculture Ministry, Ottawa, 630 p. See entry on p. 507
- Bélanger, Noël (Last revised 1994), "Tanguay, Cyprien", in Dictionary of Canadian Biography, vol. 13, University of Toronto/Université Laval, 2003–, accessed July 9, 2021.
- "Cyprien Tanguay article", New Advent Catholic Encyclopedia
- Fortier, Daniel (Autumn 2019). Bicentenaire de la naissance de Cyprien Tanguay, Société de généalogie de Québec, L’Ancêtre, vol. 46, no. 328, automne 2019, p. 41-50.
- Fortier, Daniel (Winter 2020). Généalogie d’un livre « Le Dictionnaire Tanguay, Société de généalogie de Québec, L’Ancêtre, vol. 46, no. 329, hivers 2020, p. 105-115
- Godbout, Archange (1979). Origine des familles canadiennes-françaises. Éditions Élysées. Montreal.
- Gagnon, Jacques (2014). "1871 • Cyprien Tanguay" in Monuments Intellectuels de la Nouvelle-France et du Québec Ancien edited by Claude Corbo, Presses de l’Université de Montréal, pp. 247-259.
- Jetté, R. (1993). Les pionniers de la généalogie au Québec, Cap-aux-Diamants, (34) 14–17.
- Rose, Geo. Maclean (editor, 1886). A Cyclopæedia of Canadian biography, Toronto: Rose Publishing Company. 807 pp. See entry on pp. 195-196.
- Saint-Hilaire, Guy (2010). L’histoire de la généalogie au Québec, des origines à 1960 Histoire Québec, 15(3), 30–34.
- Tremblay, S. (1988). Cyprien Tanguay, l’auteur du dictionnaire. Cap-aux-Diamants, 4(1), 68–68.

,
