= April 20 (Eastern Orthodox liturgics) =

Day in the Eastern Orthodox liturgical calendar

Eastern Orthodox liturgical calendar
April 19	April 20	April 21
April 20 O.S. ≍ May 3 N.S. April 20 N.S ≍ April 7 O.S.

An Eastern Orthodox cross

April 20 in Eastern Orthodox liturgical calendars is a feast day and a day of commemoration of saints and martyrs. Although some Orthodox churches use the Revised Julian Calendar and others use the traditional Julian calendar, the fixed commemorations for their respective April 20 are broadly the same, no matter which calendar is used. (Note: Despite the dates being the same, the days to which they refer typically differ by 13 days. The notation Old Style or O.S. is sometimes used to indicate a date in the traditional Julian Calendar (the "Old Calendar"). The notation New Style or N.S. indicates a date in the Revised Julian calendar (the "New Calendar").)

== Saints ==
- Apostle Zacchaeus of the Seventy, Bishop of Caesarea in Palestine, he who was called down from the Sycamore tree by Jesus, according to the Gospel of Luke (1st century) (Note: Name days celebrated today include: Zacchaeus (Ζακχαῖος).)
- Martyrs Acindinus, Antoninus, Victor, Zenon, Zoticus, Theonas, Caesareus, Severian and Christophoros (284-305) (Note: "The same day, the holy martyrs Victor, Zoticus, Zeno, Acindinus, Caesareus, Severian, Chrysophorus, Theonas, and Antoninus, who suffered martyrdom after undergoing various trials.") (see also: April 18 - Slavic)
- Venerable Theodore Trichinas ("the Hair-Shirt Wearer"), hermit near Constantinople (400) (Note: "The same day, St. Theodore, confessor, surnamed Trichinas, from the rough hair garment which he wore. He was renowned for many miracles, but especially for his power over the demons. From his body issues a liquid which imparts health to the sick.")
- Saint Theotimus, Bishop of Tomis in Moesia (Lesser Scythia) (407) (Note: "At Tomis, in Scythia, St. Theotimus, bishop, whose great sanctity and miracles procured him the veneration of unbelieving barbarians.")
- Blessed Gregory (593) and Anastasius I (599), Patriarchs of Antioch.
- Hieromartyr Anastasius II, Patriarch of Antioch (609) (Note: "Sainted Anastasias II, Patriarch of Antioch, entered upon the throne after the holy Patriarch Anastasias I the Sinaite (561-572; 593-599). He governed the Church for 10 years and was killed in 609 by Jews, – when emperor Phocas (602-610) issued an edict, forcing all to accept baptism.")
- Venerable Anastasius Sinaita, Abbot of the Monastery of St. Catherine at Sinai (c. 700) (see also: April 21)
- Venerable Ioannis the Palaiolavritis ("of the Old Lavra"), at St. Chariton's Monastery, in the Judean Desert. (see also: April 19)

== Pre-Schism Western saints ==
- Martyrs Sulpicius and Servilian, martyrs in Rome who were beheaded under Trajan (c. 117) (Note: "AT Rome, the holy martyrs Sulpicius and Servilian, who were converted to the faith of Christ by the discourses and the miracles of the holy virgin Domitilla. Having refused to sacrifice to the idols, they were beheaded by Anian, prefect of the city, in the persecution of Trajan.")
- Saints Marcellinus of Embrun, Vincent and Domninus, born in North Africa, they went to France and preached in the Dauphiné (c. 374) (Note: Born in North Africa, they went to France and preached in the Dauphiné. St Marcellinus was consecrated first Bishop of Embrun by St Eusebius of Vercelli. The relics of the three saints are venerated in Digne in the Alps.) (Note: "At Embrun, in France, St. Marcellin, first bishop of that city, who by divine inspiration came from Africa with his holy companions Vincent and Domninus, and converted to the faith of Christ the greatest portion of the inhabitants of the maritime Alps, by his preaching and the wonderful prodigies, which he still continues to work.")
- Saint Marcian of Auxerre, a monk at the Monastery of Saints Cosmas and Damian in Auxerre (c. 470)
- Saint Cædwalla of Wessex (Cadwalla), King of the West Saxons (689) (Note: A King of Wessex in England, he was a cruel and cunning pagan. He was converted and went to Rome, where he was baptised by Pope Sergius and died in the white robe of baptism.)
- Saint Gundebert (Gumbert), monk-martyr (8th century) (Note: He married St Bertha of Val d'Or and was the brother of St Nivard. He separated from his wife, became a monk, went to Ireland and was martyred there by heathen.)
- Saint Harduin, a monk at Fontenelle Abbey in France (749), then a hermit who copied writings of the Fathers (811)
- Saint Hugh of Anzy-le-Duc, a monk at Saint Savin (c. 930) (Note: Born in Poitiers in France, he became a monk at Saint Savin. Later he restored monastic life in several monasteries. He reposed at Anzy-le-Duc.)

== Post-Schism Orthodox saints ==
- Venerable Saints Athanasius (1380) and Ioasaph (1422) of Meteora, Abbots.
- Venerable Alexander of Oshevensk, founder of Oshevensk Monastery, Arkhangelsk (1479) (Note: See: (in Russian) Александро-Ошевенский монастырь. Википедии. (Russian Wikipedia).)
- Child-Martyr Gabriel of Zabludov (Gabriel of Slutsk) (1690)

=== New martyrs and confessors ===
- New Hiero-Confessor Theodosius (Ganitsky), Bishop of Kolomna (1937) (Note: See: (in Russian) Феодосий (Ганицкий). Википедии. (Russian Wikipedia).)

== Other commemorations ==
- "Cyprus" (392) (Note: "The Cypriot Icon of the Mother of God appeared in the year 392 on the island of Cyprus and was situated in a monastery built on the place of its appearance. The celebration of this icon is done also on 9 July and on the day of the Descent of the Holy Spirit upon the apostles.") and "Keepiazh" (Kipyazha) Icons of the Mother of God.
- Translation of the relics (1991) of St. Nikolai (Velimirovich), Bishop of Ochrid and Zhicha (1956) from America to Serbia. (Note: His feast day is celebrated on March 5.)
- Repose of Schemamonk Ignatius of St. Nicephorus Monastery in Olonets (1852)
- Glorification (2014) of New Confessor Smaragda (Onishchenko), Abbess of Nezhinsk (uk), Ukraine (1945) (Note: See: (in Ukrainian) Смарагда (Онищенко) Ніжинська. Вікіпедія. (Ukrainian Wikipedia).) (see also December 28 - feast day)

== Icon gallery ==
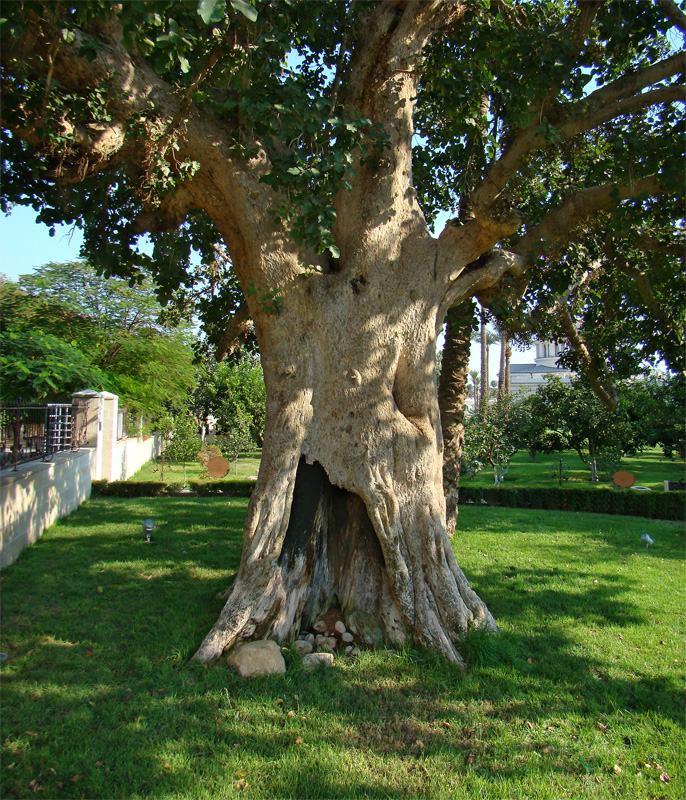
Zacchaeus's sycamore fig in Jericho, contained in the grounds of the Russian Museum.

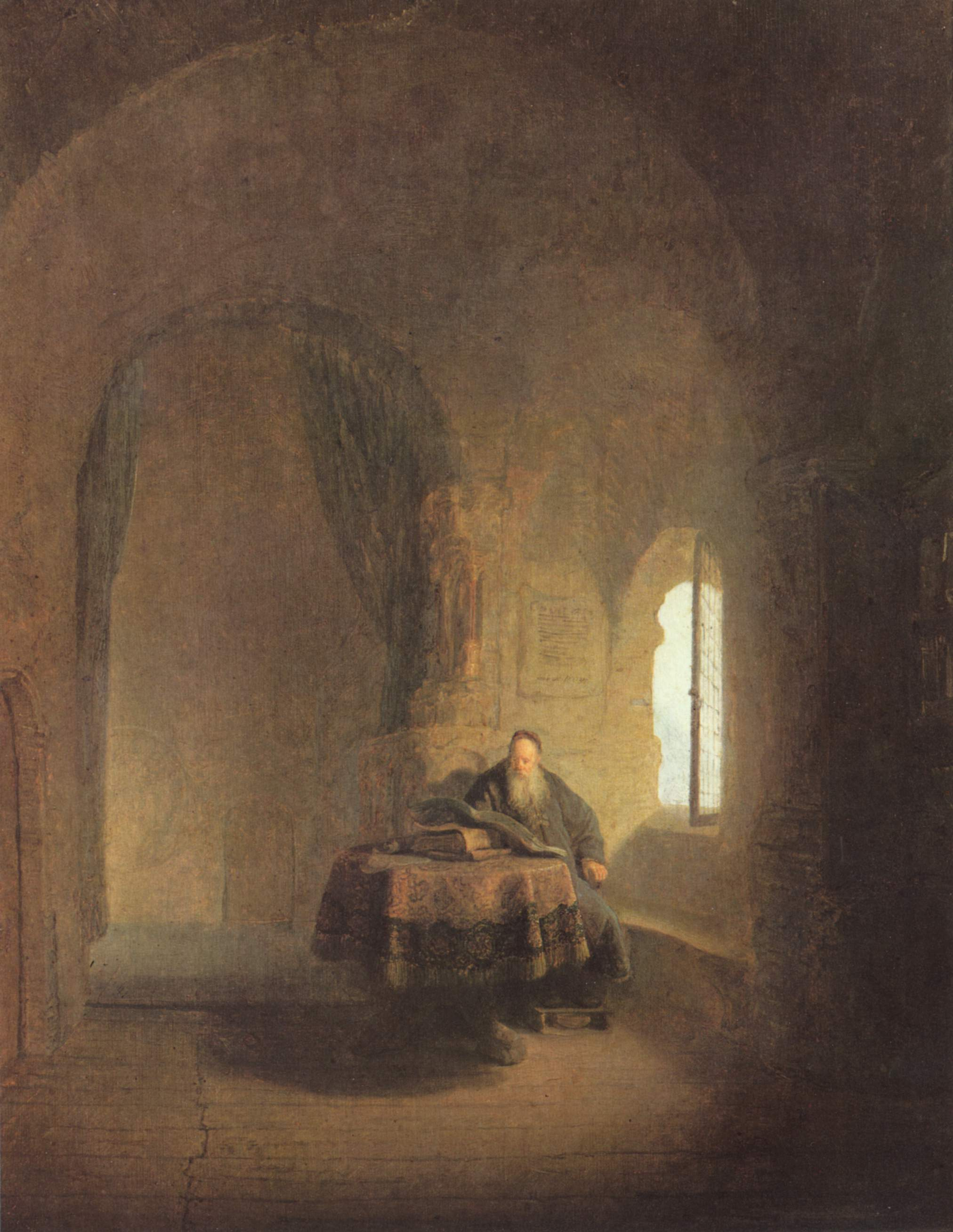
Venerable Anastasius Sinaita, Abbot of the Monastery of St. Catherine at Sinai.

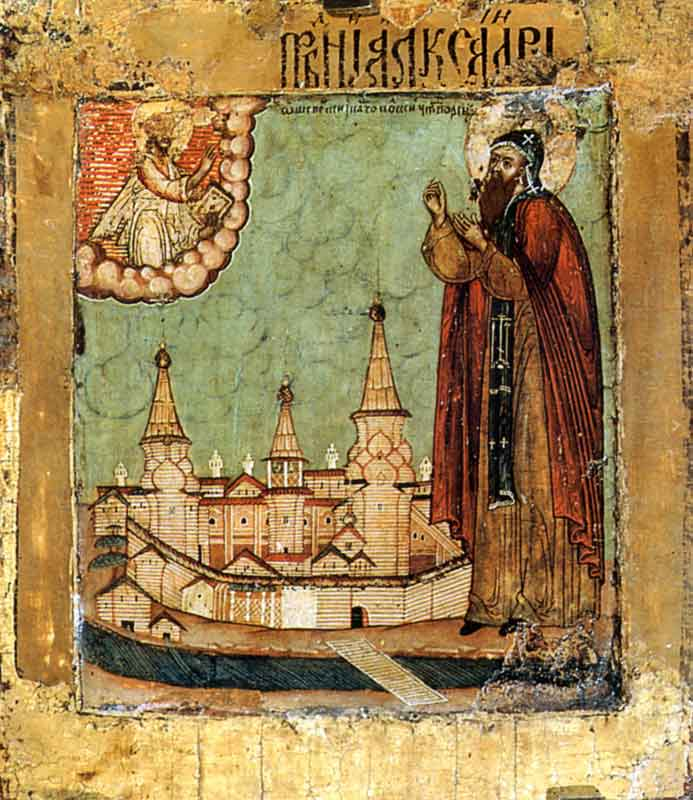
Venerable Alexander of Oshevensk, founder of Oshevensk Monastery, Arkhangelsk.

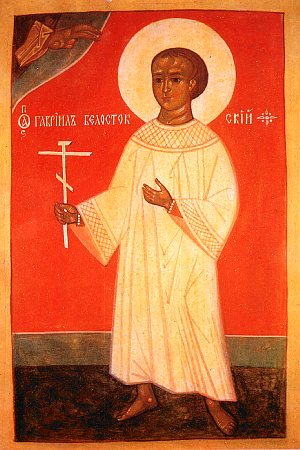
Child-Martyr Gabriel of Zabludov (Gabriel of Slutsk).

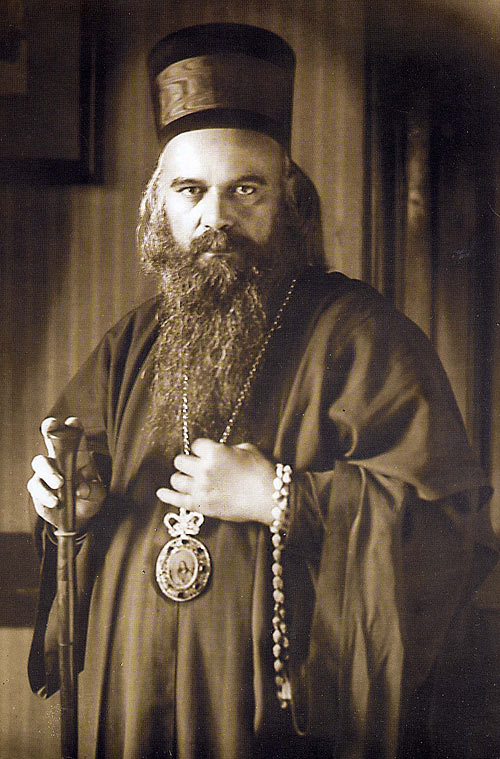
Saint Nikolaj Velimirović.

== Sources ==
- April 20 / May 3. Orthodox Calendar (pravoslavie.ru).
- May 3 / April 20. Holy Trinity Russian Orthodox Church (A parish of the Patriarchate of Moscow).
- April 20. OCA - The Lives of the Saints.
- The Autonomous Orthodox Metropolia of Western Europe and the Americas. St. Hilarion Calendar of Saints for the year of our Lord 2004. St. Hilarion Press (Austin, TX). p. 30.
- April 20. Latin Saints of the Orthodox Patriarchate of Rome.
- The Roman Martyrology. Transl. by the Archbishop of Baltimore. Last Edition, According to the Copy Printed at Rome in 1914. Revised Edition, with the Imprimatur of His Eminence Cardinal Gibbons. Baltimore: John Murphy Company, 1916. pp. 110–111.
- Rev. Richard Stanton. A Menology of England and Wales, or, Brief Memorials of the Ancient British and English Saints Arranged According to the Calendar, Together with the Martyrs of the 16th and 17th Centuries. London: Burns & Oates, 1892. pp. 168–173.

Greek Sources

- Great Synaxaristes: (in Greek) 20 Απριλίου. Μεγασ Συναξαριστησ.
- (in Greek) Συναξαριστής. 20 Απριλίου. ecclesia.gr. (H Εκκλησια Τησ Ελλαδοσ).

Russian Sources

- (in Russian) 3 мая (20 апреля). Православная Энциклопедия под редакцией Патриарха Московского и всея Руси Кирилла (электронная версия). (Orthodox Encyclopedia - Pravenc.ru).
- (in Russian) 20 апреля (ст.ст.) 3 мая 2013 (нов. ст.). Русская Православная Церковь Отдел внешних церковных связей.
