= April 21 (Eastern Orthodox liturgics) =

Day in the Eastern Orthodox liturgical calendar

Eastern Orthodox liturgical calendar
April 20	April 21	April 22
April 21 O.S. ≍ May 4 N.S. April 21 N.S ≍ April 8 O.S.

An Eastern Orthodox cross

April 21 in Eastern Orthodox liturgical calendars is a feast day and a day of commemoration of saints and martyrs. Although some Orthodox churches use the Revised Julian Calendar and others use the traditional Julian calendar, the fixed commemorations for their respective April 21 are broadly the same, no matter which calendar is used. (Note: Despite the dates being the same, the days to which they refer typically differ by 13 days. The notation Old Style or O.S. is sometimes used to indicate a date in the traditional Julian Calendar (the "Old Calendar"). The notation New Style or N.S. indicates a date in the Revised Julian calendar (the "New Calendar").)

== Saints ==
- Martyrs Theodore of Perge in Pamphylia, his mother Philippa, and Dioscorus, Socrates, and Dionysius (c. 138-161) (see also: April 19 - Greek)
- Martyr Alexandra the Empress, wife of Diocletian, and those with her (303): (Note: Name days celebrated today include: Alexandra (Ἀλεξάνδρα).) (see also: April 23)

- Martyrs Isaacius, Apollo, and Codratus, of Nicomedia.

- Hieromartyrs Januarius, Bishop of Benevento, and his companions (c. 305)

- Faustus, Proclus, and Sosius, Deacons;
- Desiderius, Reader; and
- Eutychius, and Acutius, laymen, at Pozzuoli.

- Saint Maximianus, Archbishop of Constantinople (434) (see also: November 17)
- Venerable Anastasius Sinaita, Abbot of the Monastery of St. Catherine at Sinai (c. 700) (see also: April 20 - Slavic)
- Martyr Karol (Charles)

== Pre-Schism Western saints ==
- Saint Cyprian, Bishop of Brescia (582) (Note: His relics are enshrined in the church of San Pietro in Oliveto in Brescia.)
- Saint Beuno, Abbot, of Clynnog Fawr, Wales (642) (Note: Born in Wales, he founded monasteries at Llanfeuno in Herefordshire and Llanymynech. His name is chiefly connected with Clynnog Fawr in Gwynedd.)
- Saint Maelruba of Apur Crossan (Maelrubius, Maolrubha), Ireland (722) (Note: A monk at St Comgall's monastery at Bangor, who went to Iona. He afterwards founded a church at Applecross on the north-west coast of Scotland.)
- Saint Frodulphus (Frou), a monk at St Martin's in Autun (c. 750) (Note: A disciple of St Medericus (Merry), he became a monk at St Martin's in Autun in France, from where he was driven by the Saracens and he settled in Barjon.)

== Post-Schism Orthodox saints ==
- Saint Theodore the Philosopher of Kamske, martyred by Mongols (1323)
- Venerable Jacob (Jakov, James), Abbot of Stromynsk Monastery, Radonezh (1392) (Note: "The Monk Jakov (James) of Stromynsk was a disciple of the Monk Sergei of Radonezh (Comm. 25 September). He was hegumen of the Stromynsk monastery in the Name of the Life-originating Trinity. The Monk Sergei himself founded this monastery in 1380 at the request of Great Prince Dimitrii Donskoi (1363-1389) in memory the victory of Kulikovo Pole (Field). At this monastery there was as hegumen also the Monk Savva of Svenigorod (1381-1392, Comm. 3 December). The Monk Jakov was buried in the monastery church.")
- Saint Alexis, Priest of, Bortsurmany, Nizhny Novgorod (1848)

=== New martyrs and confessors ===
- New Hieromartyr John Prigorovsky, Priest (1918)
- Saint Nicholas Pisarevsky, Confessor, Priest (1933)
- New Hieromartyr Alexis Protopopov, Priest (1938)
- New Hieromartyr Protopresbyter Basil Martysz of Teratyn, Chelm and Podlasie, Poland (1945) (Note: See also: (in Polish) Bazyli Martysz. (Polish Wikipedia).) (Note: Among the Martyrs of Chełm and Podlasie is St. Basil Martysz, who served for more than a decade in several locations throughout America and Canada. (The commemoration of the Martyrs of Chełm and Podlasie was set for the day of the Zaleszańska Icon of the Mother of God, that is, the last Saturday of July.)) (see also: May 4)

== Other commemorations ==
- Synaxis of The Mozdok Icon of the Mother of God (Mozdokskaya) (1768) (Note: Commemorated on April 21, August 15 and on the Prepolovenie – Mid-Pentecost. "The Mozdok Icon of the Mother of God, a copy of the Iversk icon, was sent in the XIII Century by the holy empress Tamara as a gift to the newly-enlightened Christians of the Ossetian aul (village) of Mar'yam-Kadu. In 1768 this icon appeared remarkably on the banks of the Terek, not far from Mozdok. Bishop Gaii built a chapel for the icon. In 1796-1797 there was built at the place of the chapel a church in honour of the Uspenie (Dormition or Repose) of the Most Holy Mother of God, along which was soon founded a women's monastery (abolished together with the Mozdok diocese in 1799). At the end of the XIX Century the inhabitants of Mozdok built a splendid church in honour of the Mozdok-Iversk icon of the Mother of God. The Mother of God has repeatedly rendered speedy aid to the believing through Her holy icon.")
- Uncovering of the relics (1999) of St. Theodore, Abbot of Sanaxar Monastery (1791) (Note: See also: (in Russian) Феодор Санаксарский. Википедии. (Russian Wikipedia).)
- Repose of Schemamonk Nicetas of Valaam Monastery (1907)
- Repose of Elder Dometian of Tula (1908)
- Repose of Hieroschemamonk Antipas II of Valaam Monastery (1912)
- Repose of Nun Stefanida of Kosovo, Serbia.

== Icon gallery ==
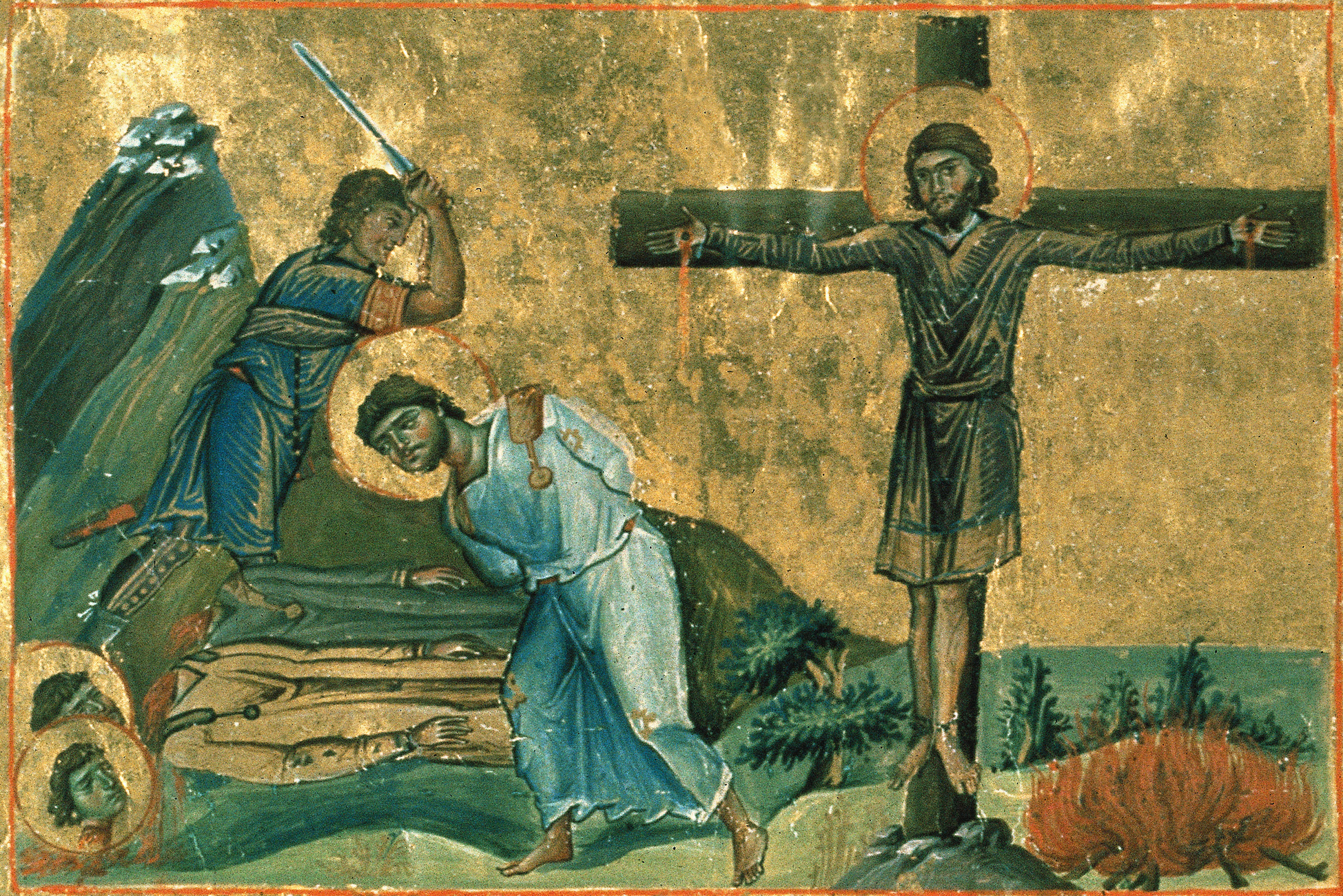
Martyrs Theodore of Perge in Pamphylia, his mother Philippa, and Dioscorus, Socrates, and Dionysius.

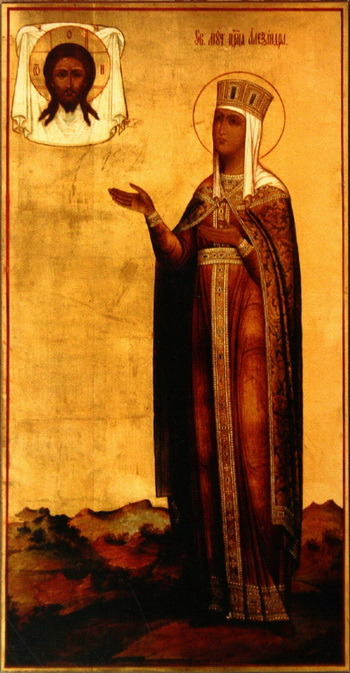
St. Alexandra the Empress.

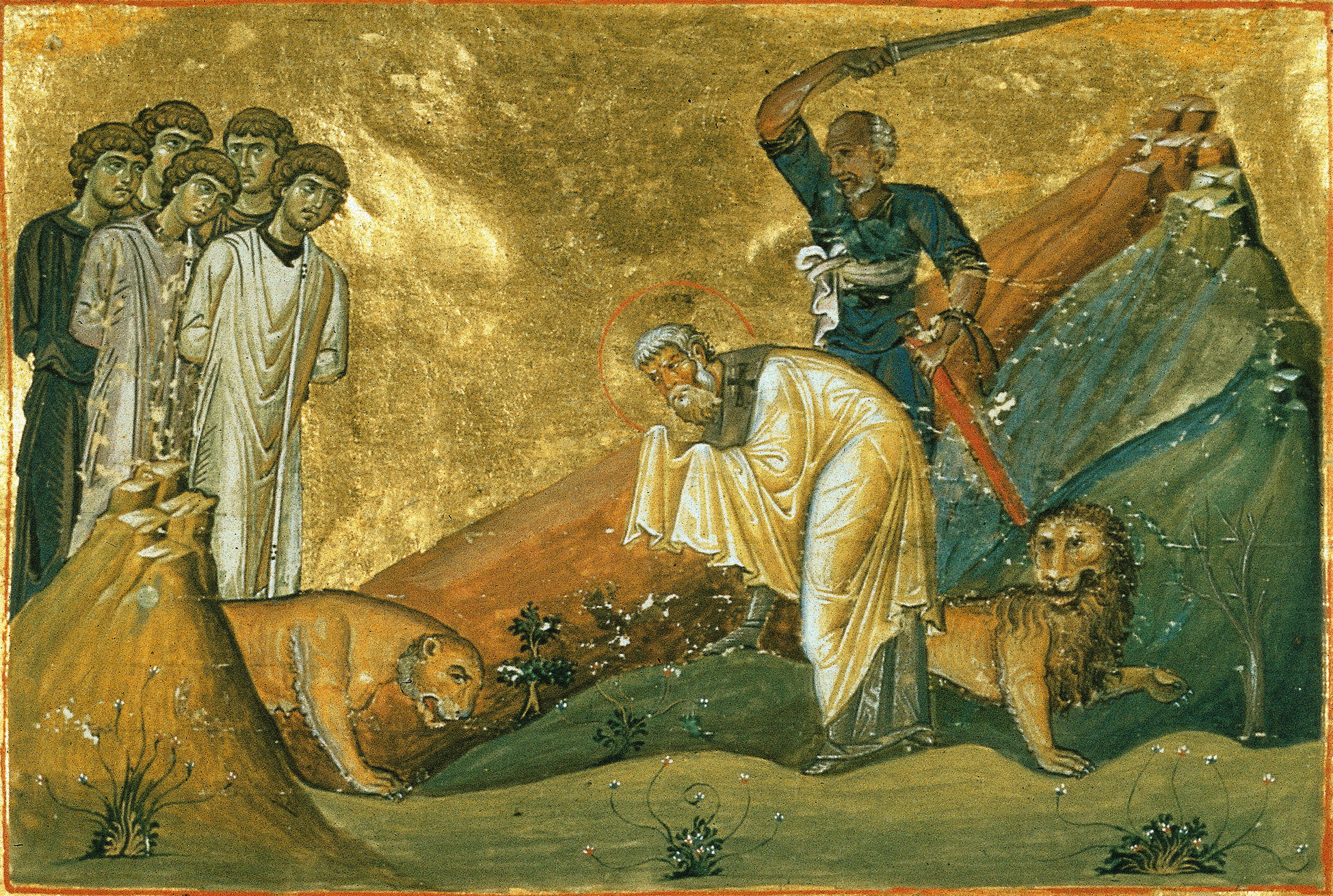
Hieromartyrs Januarius, Bishop of Benevento, and his companions.

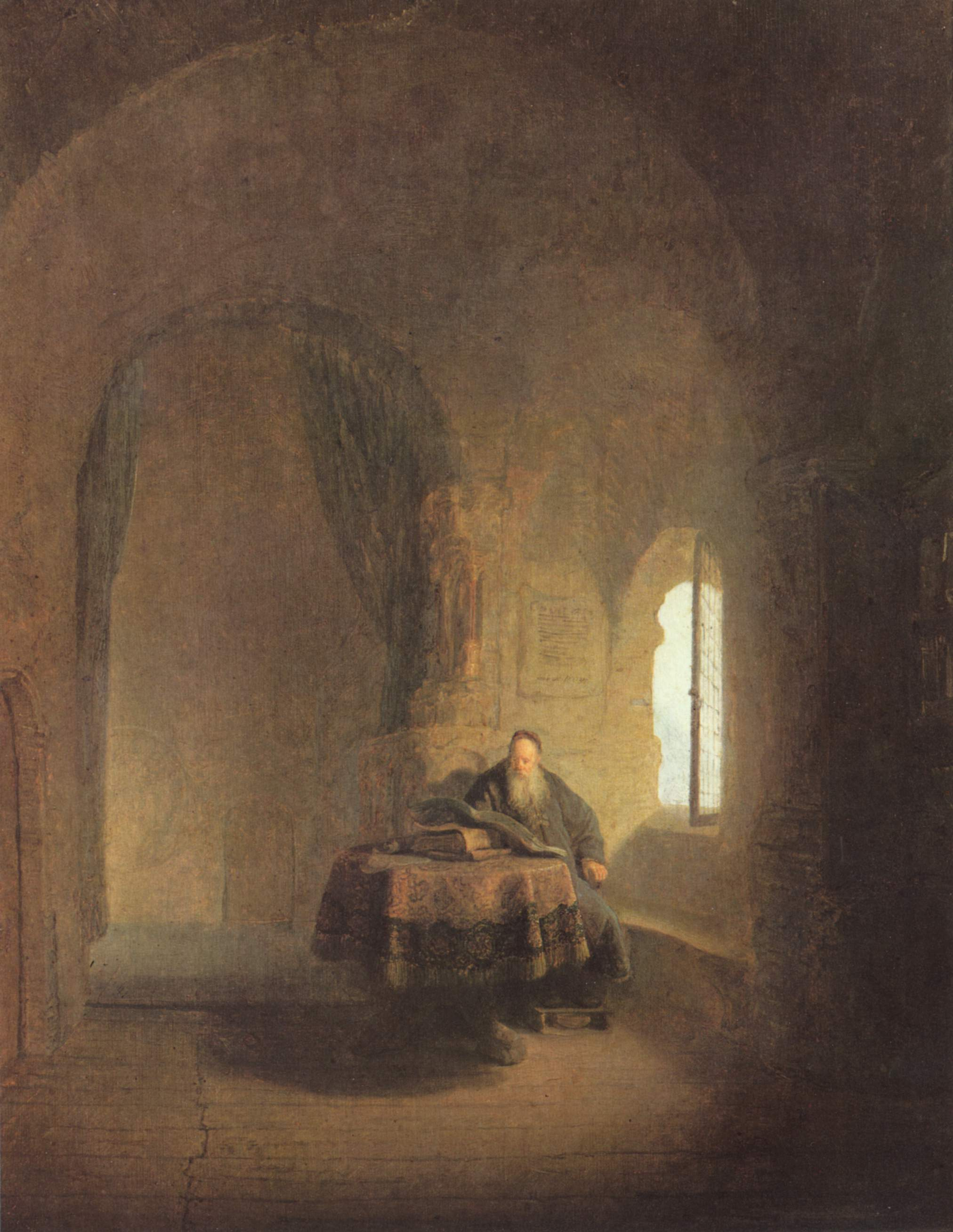
Venerable Anastasius Sinaita, Abbot of the Monastery of St. Catherine at Sinai.

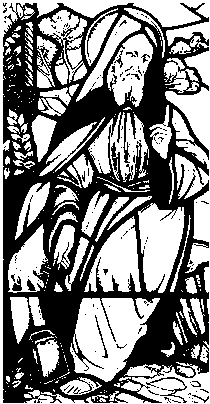
Saint Beuno, Abbot, of Clynnog Fawr, Wales.

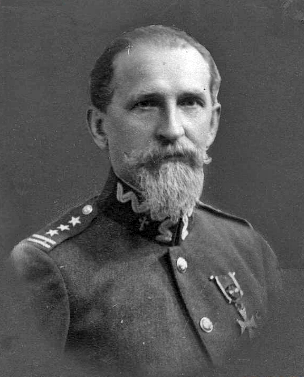
New Hieromartyr Protopresbyter Basil Martysz of Teratyn.

== Sources ==
- April 21 / May 4. Orthodox Calendar (pravoslavie.ru).
- May 4 / April 21. Holy Trinity Russian Orthodox Church (A parish of the Patriarchate of Moscow).
- April 21. OCA - The Lives of the Saints.
- The Autonomous Orthodox Metropolia of Western Europe and the Americas. St. Hilarion Calendar of Saints for the year of our Lord 2004. St. Hilarion Press (Austin, TX). p. 30.
- April 21. Latin Saints of the Orthodox Patriarchate of Rome.
- The Roman Martyrology. Transl. by the Archbishop of Baltimore. Last Edition, According to the Copy Printed at Rome in 1914. Revised Edition, with the Imprimatur of His Eminence Cardinal Gibbons. Baltimore: John Murphy Company, 1916. pp. 111-112.
- Rev. Richard Stanton. A Menology of England and Wales, or, Brief Memorials of the Ancient British and English Saints Arranged According to the Calendar, Together with the Martyrs of the 16th and 17th Centuries. London: Burns & Oates, 1892. pp. 173-176.

Greek Sources

- Great Synaxaristes: (in Greek) 21 Απριλίου. Μεγασ Συναξαριστησ.
- (in Greek) Συναξαριστής. 21 Απριλίου. ecclesia.gr. (H Εκκλησια Τησ Ελλαδοσ).

Russian Sources

- (in Russian) 4 мая (21 апреля). Православная Энциклопедия под редакцией Патриарха Московского и всея Руси Кирилла (электронная версия). (Orthodox Encyclopedia - Pravenc.ru).
- (in Russian) 21 апреля (ст.ст.) 4 мая 2013 (нов. ст.). Русская Православная Церковь Отдел внешних церковных связей.
