= Mamertinus of Auxerre =

Saint Mamertinus
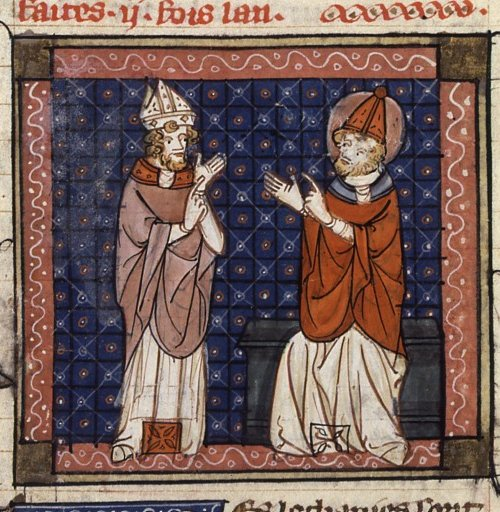
- Saint Gregory I (left) and Saint Mamertinus (14th century French manuscript)
- Died: c. 462 AD
- Venerated in: Roman Catholic Church
- Feast: March 30
- Attributes: depicted exhorting monks, lying on a mat in his cell before his death

Saint Mamertinus of Auxerre (French: Saint Mamert) (d. ~462 AD) was a monk and abbot. He was converted by Germanus of Auxerre and became a monk at the Abbey of Saints Cosmas and Damian, Auxerre (later rededicated to Saint Marianus of Auxerre). He later served as its abbot.
