= May 4 (Eastern Orthodox liturgics) =

Day in the Eastern Orthodox liturgical calendar

Eastern Orthodox liturgical calendar
May 3	May 4	May 5
May 4 O.S. ≍ May 17 N.S. May 4 N.S ≍ April 21 O.S.

An Eastern Orthodox cross

May 4 in Eastern Orthodox liturgical calendars is a feast day and a day of commemoration of saints and martyrs. Although some Orthodox churches use the Revised Julian Calendar and others use the traditional Julian calendar, the fixed commemorations for their respective May 4 are broadly the same, no matter which calendar is used. (Note: Despite the dates being the same, the days to which they refer typically differ by 13 days. The notation Old Style or O.S. is sometimes used to indicate a date in the traditional Julian Calendar (the "Old Calendar"). The notation New Style or N.S. indicates a date in the Revised Julian calendar (the "New Calendar").)

== Saints ==
- Virgin-martyr Pelagia of Tarsus in Asia Minor (287)
- Hieromartyr Albian (Olbian), Bishop of Anaea in Asia Minor, and his disciples (284-303)
- Martyrs Aphrodisius, Leontius, Anthony, Valerian, Macrobius, others, at Scythopolis of Palestine (4th c.)
- Hieromartyr Silvanus of Gaza, bishop, and with him 40 martyrs (311) (see also: October 14)
- Saint Hilary of the desert, the Wonderworker.
- Saint Nicephorus of Medikion, abbot and founder of Medikion Monastery (813)
- Saint Athanasios of Corinth, bishop (10th-11th century)

== Pre-Schism Western saints ==
- Hieromartyr Porphyrius (250)
- Saint Curcodomus, a deacon in Rome sent to help St Peregrinus (2nd century)
- Hieromartyr Erasmus of Formiae, bishop in Campania, and 20,000 martyrs with him (303)
- Martyrs Florian and 40 companions, at Lorsch, Austria (304)
- Saint Monica of Tagaste, the mother of St. Augustine of Hippo (387)
- Saint Nepotianus, nephew of St Heliodorus, Bishop of Altino near Venice in Italy (395)
- Saint Venerius of Milan, second bishop of Milan, a loyal supporter of St John Chrysostom (409)
- Saint Conleth, first Bishop of Kildare (c. 519) (see also: May 3 and May 10)
- Saint Anthony du Rocher, a disciple of St Benedict and companion of St Maurus in his mission to France, founder of the monastery of Saint Julian in Tours (6th century)
- Saint Æthelred (Ethelred, Ailred), king of Mercia and monk (716)
- Saint Sacerdos of Limoges, Bishop of Limoges (720)
- Saint Gotthard of Hildesheim, became Bishop of Hildesheim in 1022 and did much to spread the Faith (1038)

== Post-Schism Orthodox saints ==
- Saint Theodosia (Fedosia, in monasticism Euphrosyne), princess of Vladimir, wife of Jaroslav Vsevolodovich, mother of St. Alexander Nevsky (1244)
- Venerable Nicephorus (the Hesychast) of Mount Athos, teacher of St. Gregory Palamas (1340)
- Saint Maura of Mount Ceahlău, Schemanun, a great hesychast hermit (18th c.) (Note: See: (in Romanian) Mavra de pe Ceahlău. Wikipedia. (Romanian Wikipedia).)

=== New martyrs and confessors ===
- New Martyrs of Reskovac (sr), Republika Srpska, who suffered at the hands of the Turks (1688)
- 4,000–5,000 New Martyrs of Batak, Bulgaria, by the Ottoman Turks (1876) (Note: The Bulgarian Orthodox Church glorified the Batak martyrs in April 2011.)
- New Hieromartyr Dimitry (Lyubimov), Archbishop of Gdov (1935) (Note: See: (in Russian) Димитрий (Любимов). Википедии. (Russian Wikipedia).)
- New Hieromartyr John Vasiliev, priest, (1942)
- New Hieromartyr Nicholas Tochtuev, deacon, (1943)
- New Hieromartyr Vasily Martysz, Archpriest (1945) (Note: See: (in Polish) Bazyli Martysz. (Polish Wikipedia).) (see also April 21)

== Other commemorations ==
- Translation of the relics of the Righteous Lazarus and Saint Mary Magdalene, Equal-to-the-Apostles, to Constantinople
- Translation of the relics (1775) of the Alfanov brothers of Novgorod, founders of the Sokolnitzki Monastery (14th-15th c.):

- Saints: Nicetas, Cyril, Nicephorus, Clement, and Isaac.

- Icon of the Mother of God "Staro Rus" (Staraya Russa, Old Russian) (1570) (Note: See: (in Russian) Старорусская икона Божией Матери. Википедии. (Russian Wikipedia).)

== Icon gallery ==
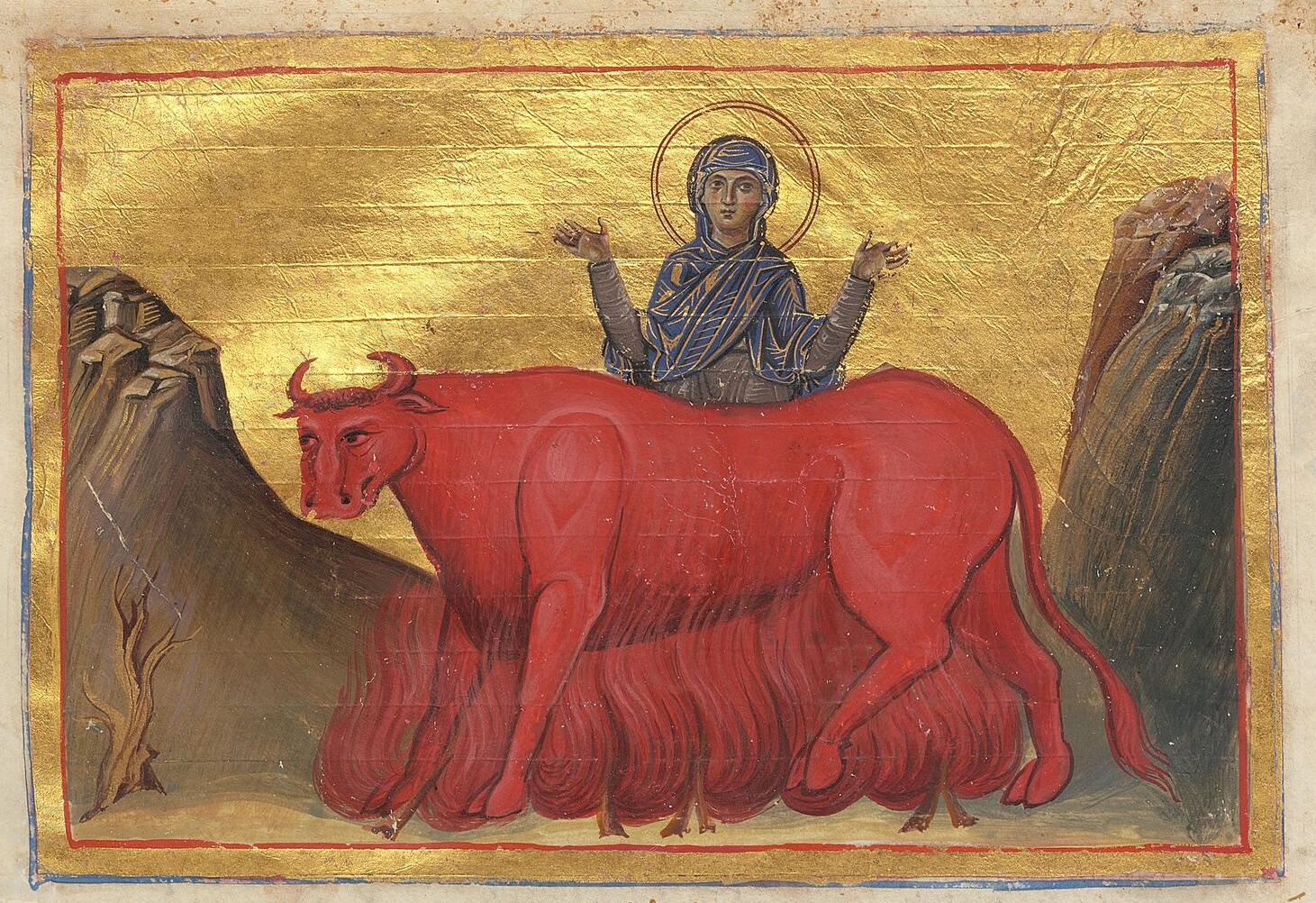
St. Pelagia of Tarsus (Menologion of Basil II, 10th century).

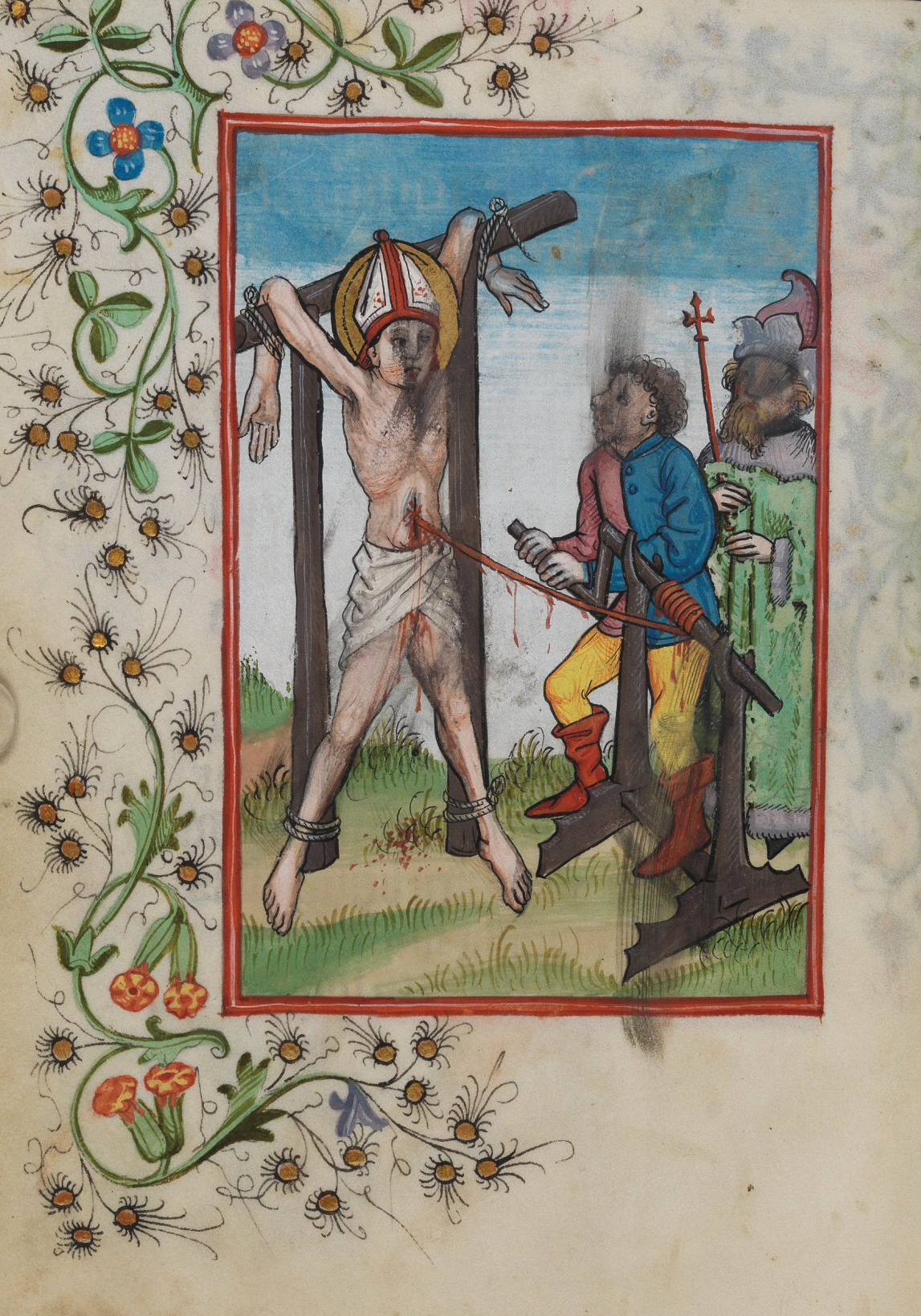
The Martyrdom of Erasmus of Formiae.

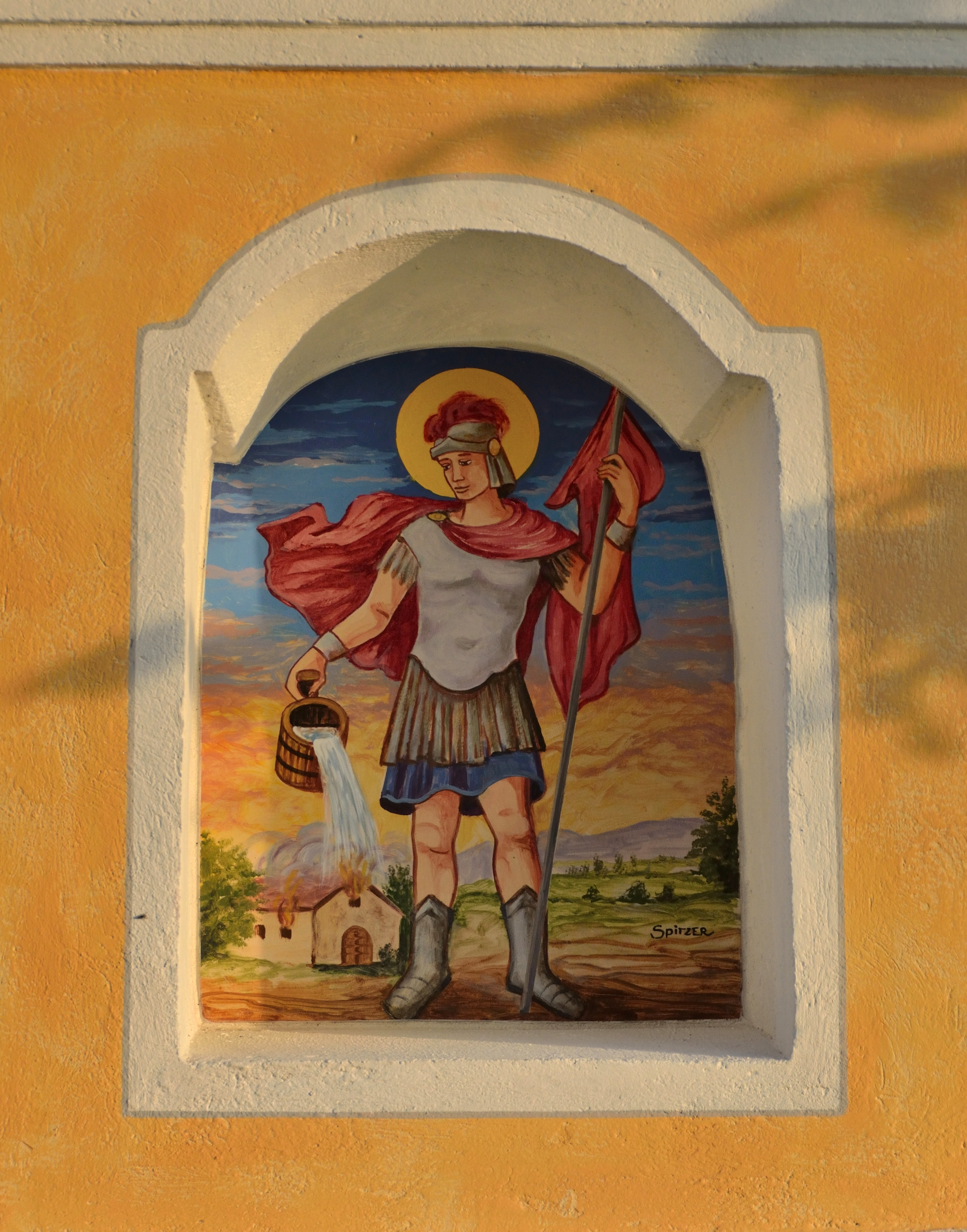
St. Florian.

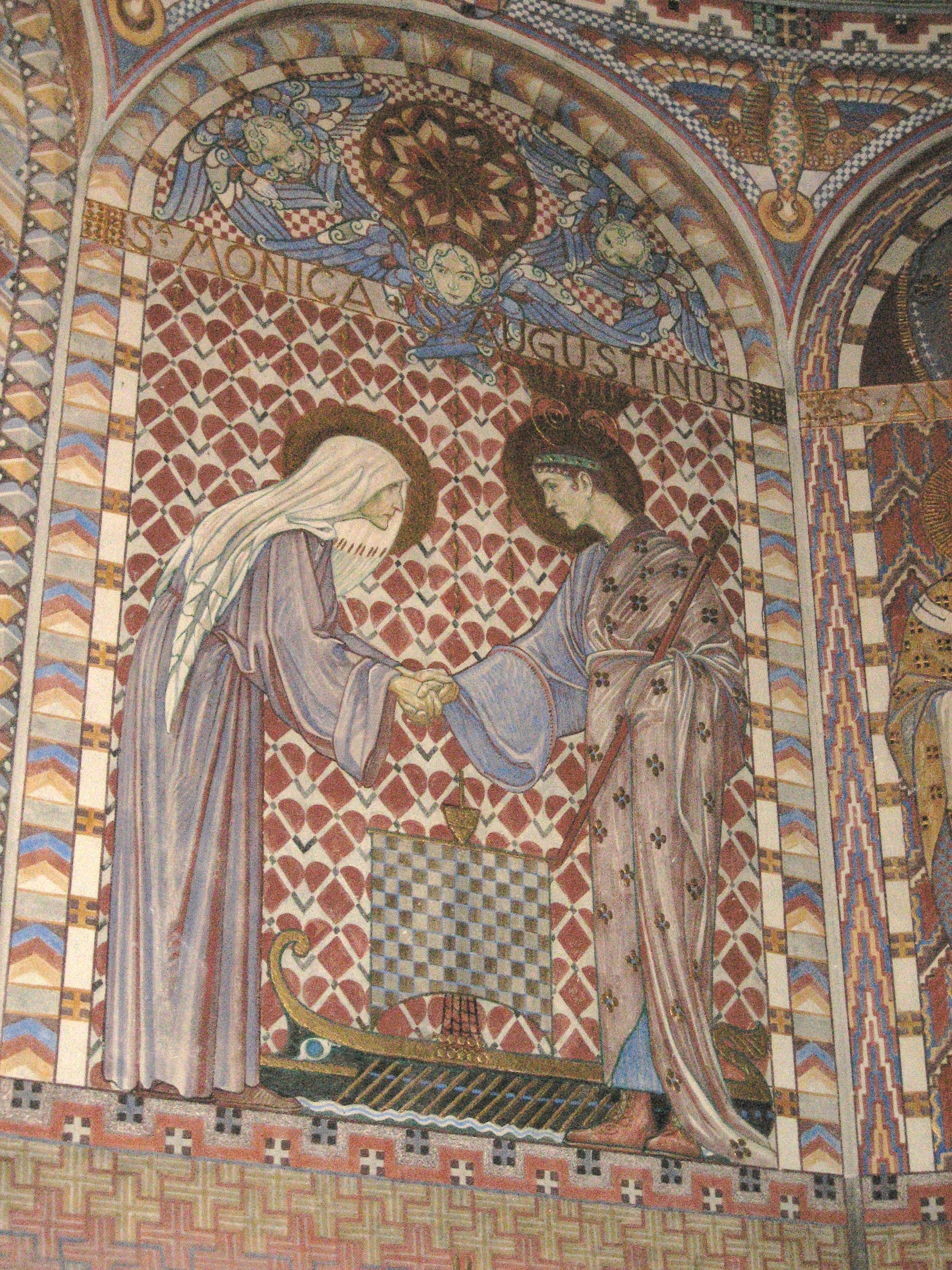
St. Monica of Tagaste, mother of St. Augustine of Hippo.

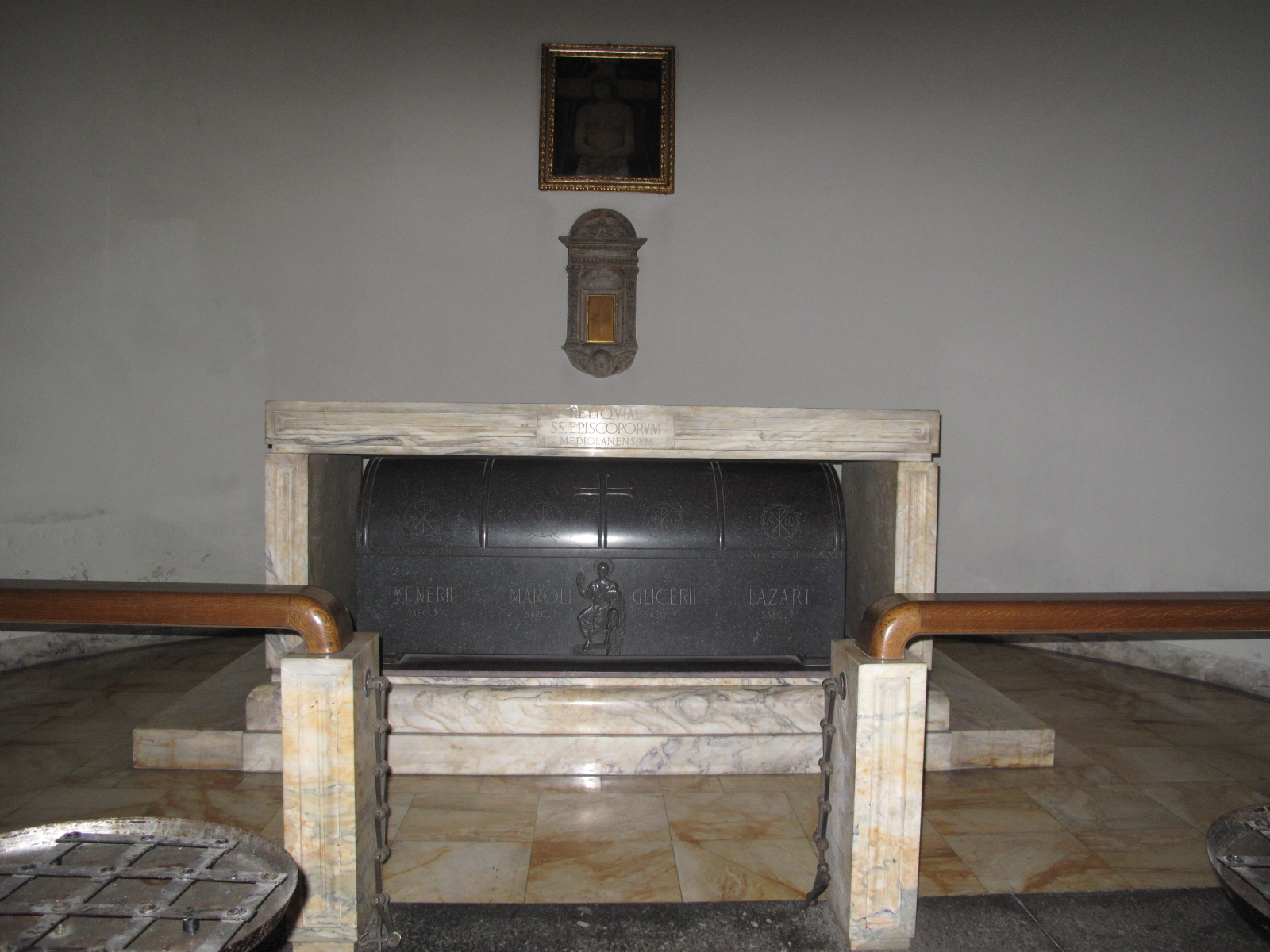
Altar with sarcophagus containing the corpses of Sts. Venerius, Marolus, Glycerius, Lazarus, bishops of Milan (San Nazaro Maggiore basilica in Milan).

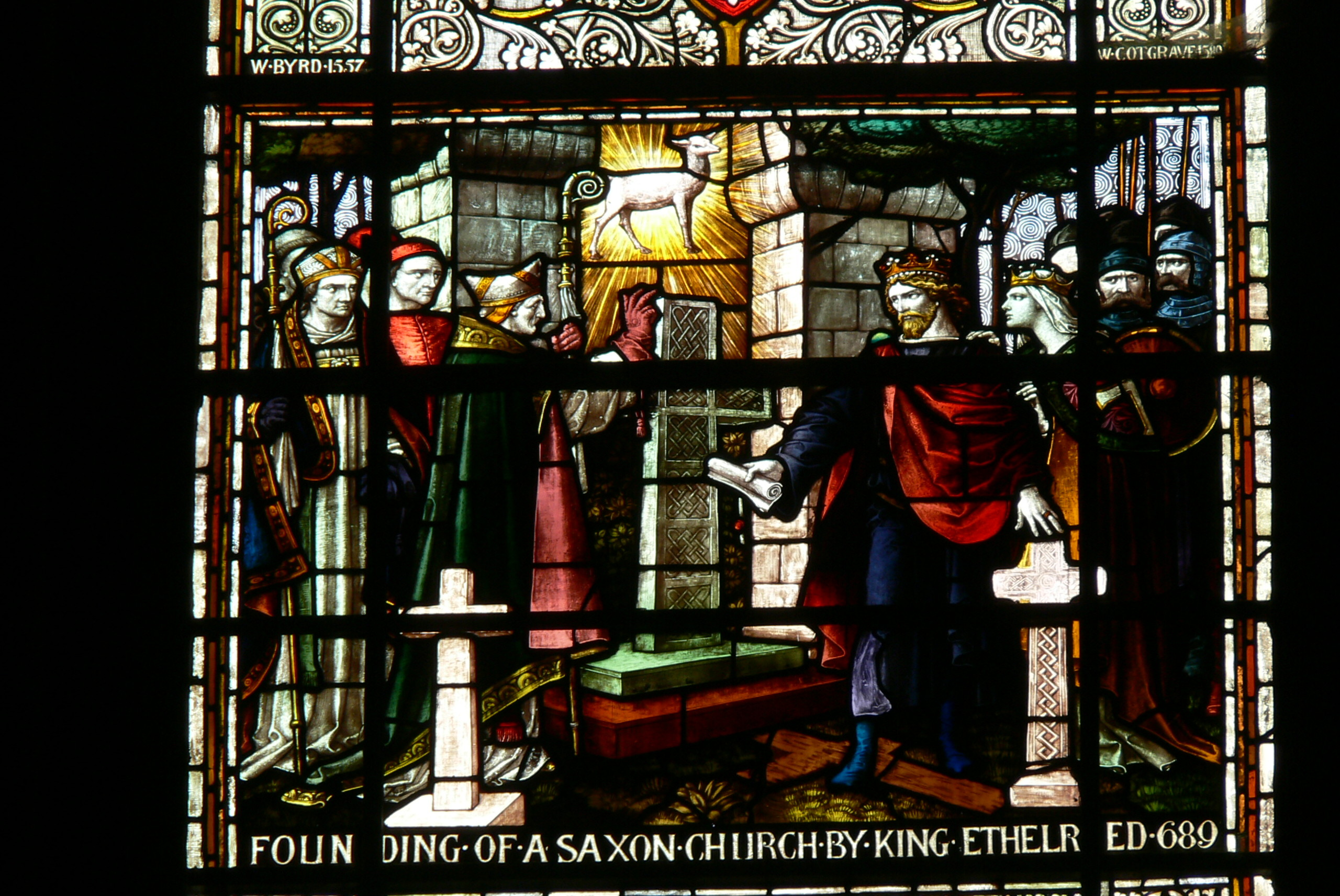
Stained glass window (1890): Foundation of the church of St John's Church, Chester, England, by king Æthelred of Mercia 689.

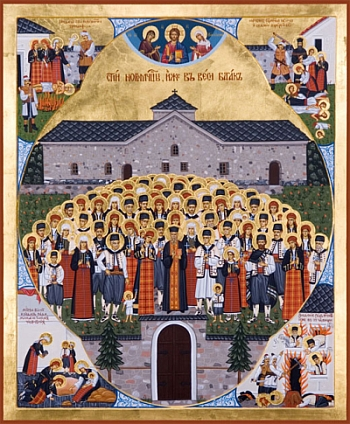
4,000–5,000 New Martyrs of Batak, Bulgaria.

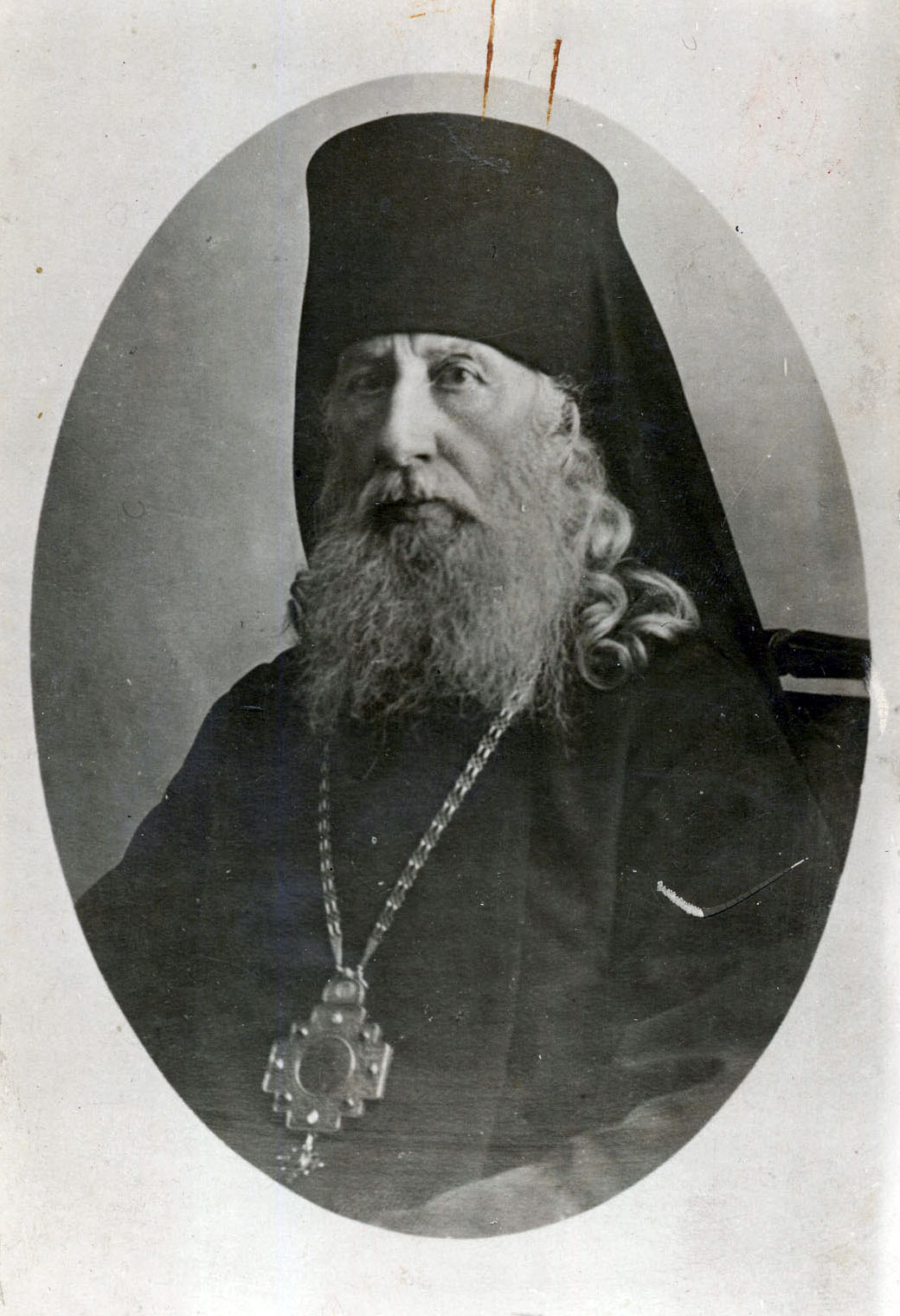
New Hieromartyr Dimitry (Lyubimov), Archbishop of Gdov.

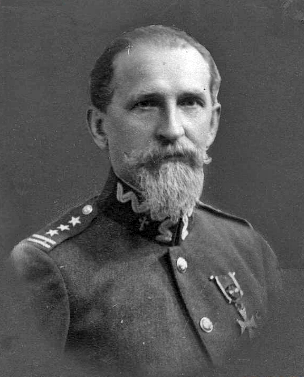
New Hieromartyr Protopresbyter Basil Martysz of Teratyn.

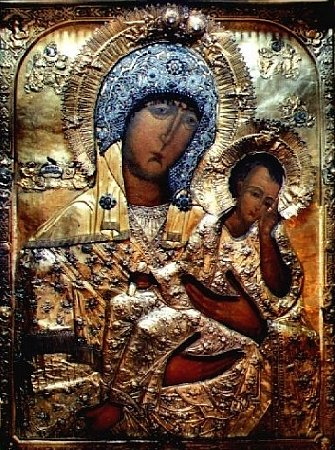
Icon of the Mother of God "Staro Rus" (Staraya Russa).

== Sources ==
- May 3/16. Orthodox Calendar (PRAVOSLAVIE.RU).
- May 17, 2011 / May 4, HOLY TRINITY RUSSIAN ORTHODOX CHURCH (A parish of the Patriarchate of Moscow)
- May 4, 2011, OCA - The Lives of the Saints.
- May 4. Latin Saints of the Orthodox Patriarchate of Rome.
- May 4, The Roman Martyrology.

Greek Sources

- Great Synaxaristes: (in Greek) 4 ΜΑΪΟΥ, ΜΕΓΑΣ ΣΥΝΑΞΑΡΙΣΤΗΣ.
- (in Greek) Συναξαριστής. 4 Μαΐου. ECCLESIA.GR. (H ΕΚΚΛΗΣΙΑ ΤΗΣ ΕΛΛΑΔΟΣ).

Russian Sources

- (in Russian) 17 мая (4 мая). Православная Энциклопедия под редакцией Патриарха Московского и всея Руси Кирилла (электронная версия). (Orthodox Encyclopedia - Pravenc.ru).
- (in Russian) 4 мая (ст.ст.) 17 мая 2013 (нов. ст.). Русская Православная Церковь Отдел внешних церковных связей. (DECR).
