= April 19 (Eastern Orthodox liturgics) =

Day in the Eastern Orthodox liturgical calendar

Eastern Orthodox liturgical calendar
April 18	April 19	April 20
April 19 O.S. ≍ May 2 N.S. April 19 N.S ≍ April 6 O.S.

An Eastern Orthodox cross

April 19 in Eastern Orthodox liturgical calendars is a feast day and a day of commemoration of saints and martyrs. Although some Orthodox churches use the Revised Julian Calendar and others use the traditional Julian calendar, the fixed commemorations for their respective April 19 are broadly the same, no matter which calendar is used. (Note: Despite the dates being the same, the days to which they refer typically differ by 13 days. The notation Old Style or O.S. is sometimes used to indicate a date in the traditional Julian Calendar (the "Old Calendar"). The notation New Style or N.S. indicates a date in the Revised Julian calendar (the "New Calendar").)

== Saints ==
- Martyrs Theodore of Perge in Pamphylia, his mother Philippa, and Dioscorus, Socrates, and Dionysius (c. 138-161)
- Hieromartyr Paphnutius of Jerusalem and 546 companions martyred with him (284-305) (see also: September 25)
- Martyrs Hermogenes, Caius, Expeditus, Aristonicus, Rufus and Galatas, at Melitine, in Armenia. (Note: "At Melitine, in Armenia, the holy martyrs Hermogenes, Caius, Expeditus, Aristonicus, Rufus and Galatas, crowned on the same day.")
- Martyrs Christopher, Theonas, and Antoninus, at Nicomedia (303) (see also: April 20)
- Saint George the Confessor, Bishop of Antioch in Pisidia, Confessor of the Faith (c. 741-775)
- Venerable John of the Ancient Caves (John Paleolavrite) in Palestine (8th century) (see also: April 20)
- Saint Tryphon of Constantinople, Patriarch of Constantinople (931)
- St. Nicephorus, Abbot of Katabad.

== Pre-Schism Western saints ==
- Saint Vincent of Collioure, a martyr in Collioure in Languedoc in the south of France, under Diocletian (c. 304)
- Saint Crescentius, confessor, a subdeacon in Florence in Italy and a disciple of St Zenobius and St Ambrose (c. 396)
- Saint Ursmar, missionary bishop, founder of Aulne Abbey and Wallers Abbey (713) (Note: Abbot-bishop of the Monastery of Lobbes on the Sambre and founder of Aulne and Wallers, also in present-day Belgium. His work as a bishop in Flanders was of great importance.)
- Saint Gerold, hermit at a village near Mitternach (978) (Note: Of the family of the Counts of Saxony in Germany, he donated his land to the monastery of Einsiedeln in Switzerland where his two sons, Cuno and Ulric, were monks. He went to live as a hermit at a village near Mitternach.) (Note: See also: (in German) Gerold von Großwalsertal. Wikipedia. (German Wikipedia).)
- Hieromartyr Alphege of Canterbury, Archbishop of Canterbury (1012) (Note: A monk at Deerhurst in Gloucestershire in England, then Abbot of Bath, he became Bishop of Winchester in 984 and thirtieth Archbishop of Canterbury in 1005. He was greatly loved by his flock and during the Danish invasion of 1011 he was urged to pay a ransom. He refused, was taken prisoner and martyred in Greenwich, the only Orthodox Archbishop of Canterbury to be martyred. His relics were enshrined in St Paul's in London and later in Canterbury.)

== Post-Schism Orthodox saints ==
- Venerable Symeon the Barefoot, of Philotheou Monastery, Mount Athos (1594)
- Venerable Joasaph (Bolotov) of Kodiak, Enlightener of Alaska and the American land (1799)
- New Monk-martyr Agathangelus of Esphigmenou Monastery, Mt. Athos, at Smyrna (1819)
- Saint Matrona the Blind, of Moscow (1952)
- Venerable Sebastian the Confessor of Optina and Karaganda (Elder Sebastian of Optina), Wonderworker and Clairvoyant, last of the great Optina Elders (1966) (Note: Stephen Vasilievich Fomin, or Sevastian Karagandinskiĭ, 1884-1966. See also: (in Russian) Севастиан (Фомин). Википедии. (Russian Wikipedia).) (see also: April 6)

=== New martyrs and confessors ===
- New Hiero-confessor Victor (Ostrovidov), Bishop of Glazov (1934) (Note: See also: (in Russian) Виктор (Островидов). Википедии. (Russian Wikipedia).)
- New Hieromartyr Demetrius Vlasenkov, Priest of Alma-Ata (1942)

== Other commemorations ==
- Icon of the Most Holy Mother of God "Chrysafitissis" in Monemvasia.
- Translation of the relics of Saint Moses the Wonderworker, Archbishop of Novgorod (1362) (Note: His feast day is on January 25. See also: (in Russian) Моисей (архиепископ Новгородский). Википедии. (Russian Wikipedia).)
- Uncovering of the relics (1621) of St. Joachim, founder of Opochka Monastery in Pskov (c. 1550)
- Repose of Fool-for-Christ Asenetha (Klementyeva) of Goritsy (1892)
- Repose of Hieroschemamonk and Schema-Metropolitan Alexis of Valaam (1900)

== Icon gallery ==
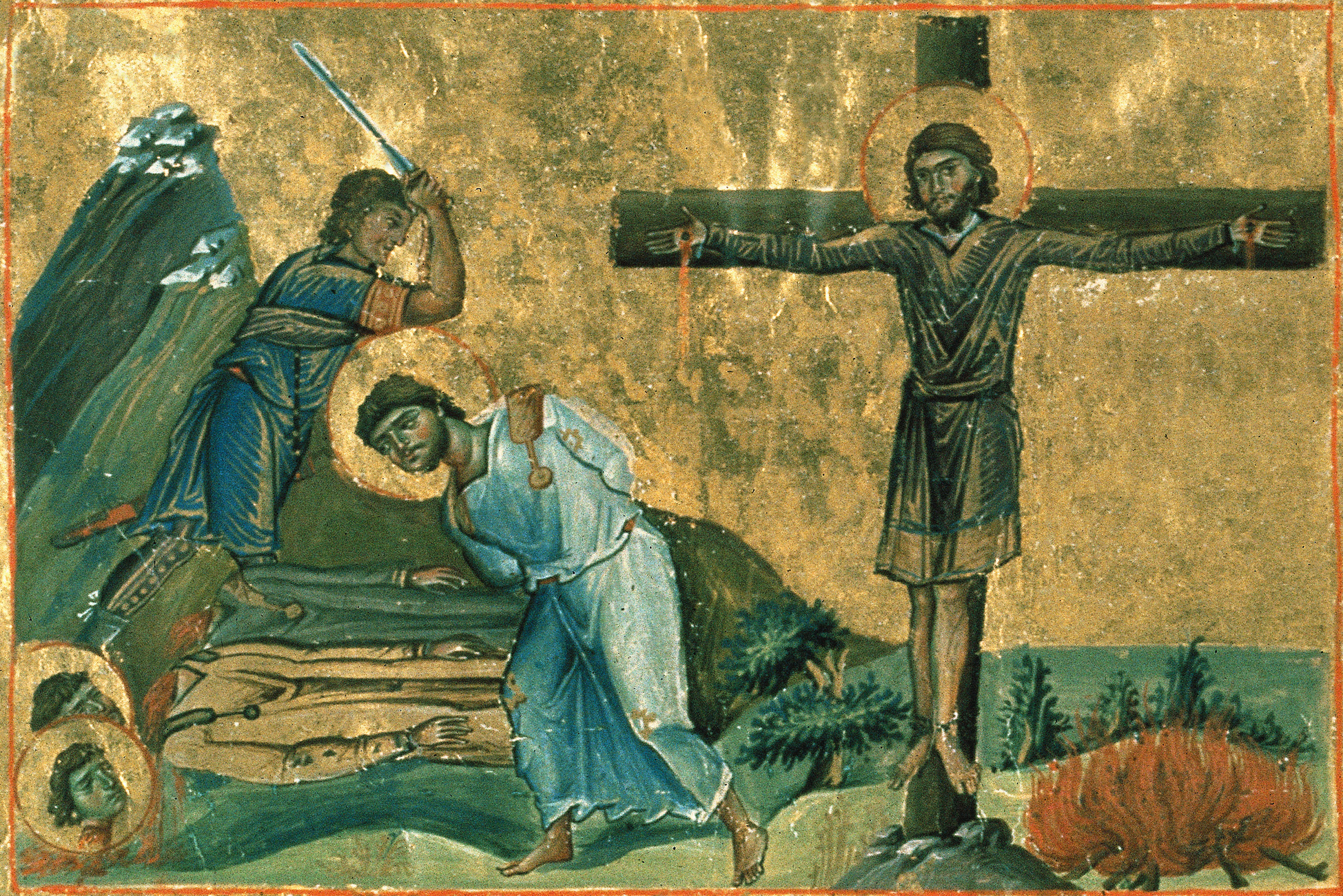
Martyrs Theodore of Perge in Pamphylia, his mother Philippa, and Dioscorus, Socrates, and Dionysius.

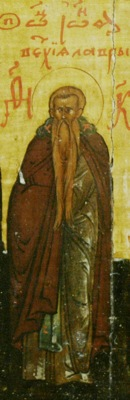
Venerable John of the Ancient Caves.

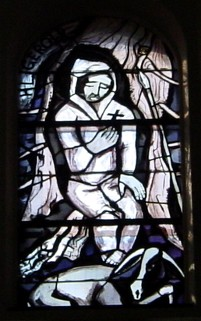
Saint Gerold von Großwalsertal.

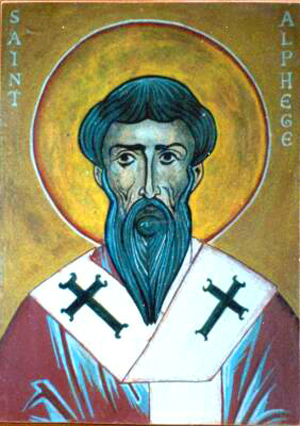
Hieromartyr Alphege of Canterbury, Archbishop of Canterbury.

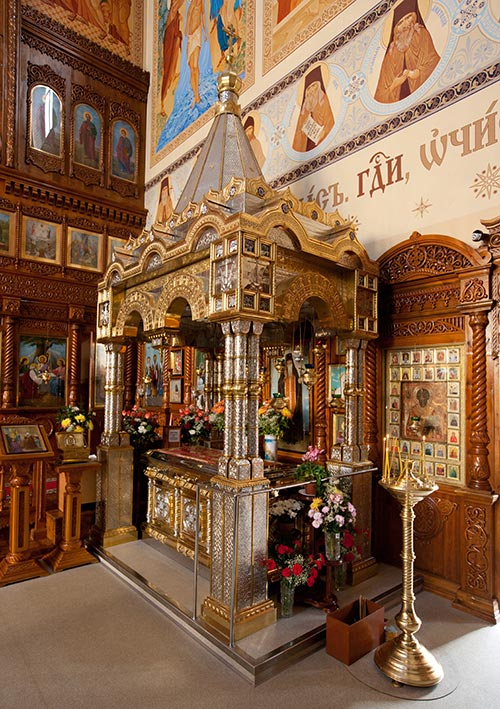
Shrine of New Hiero-confessor Sebastian (Fomin).

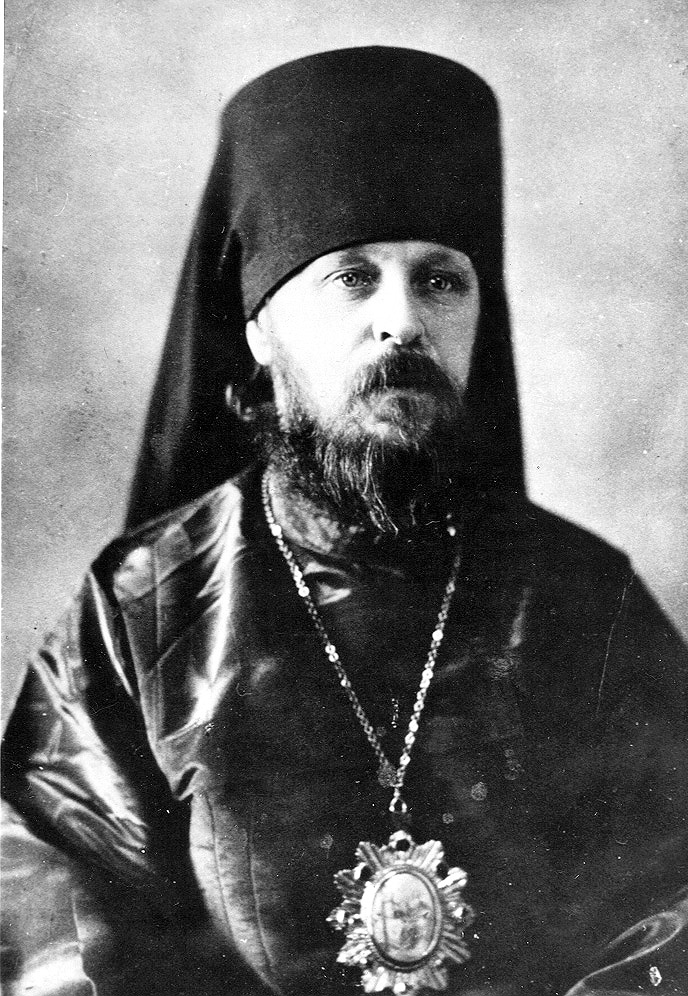
New Hiero-confessor Victor (Ostrovidov), Bishop of Glazov.

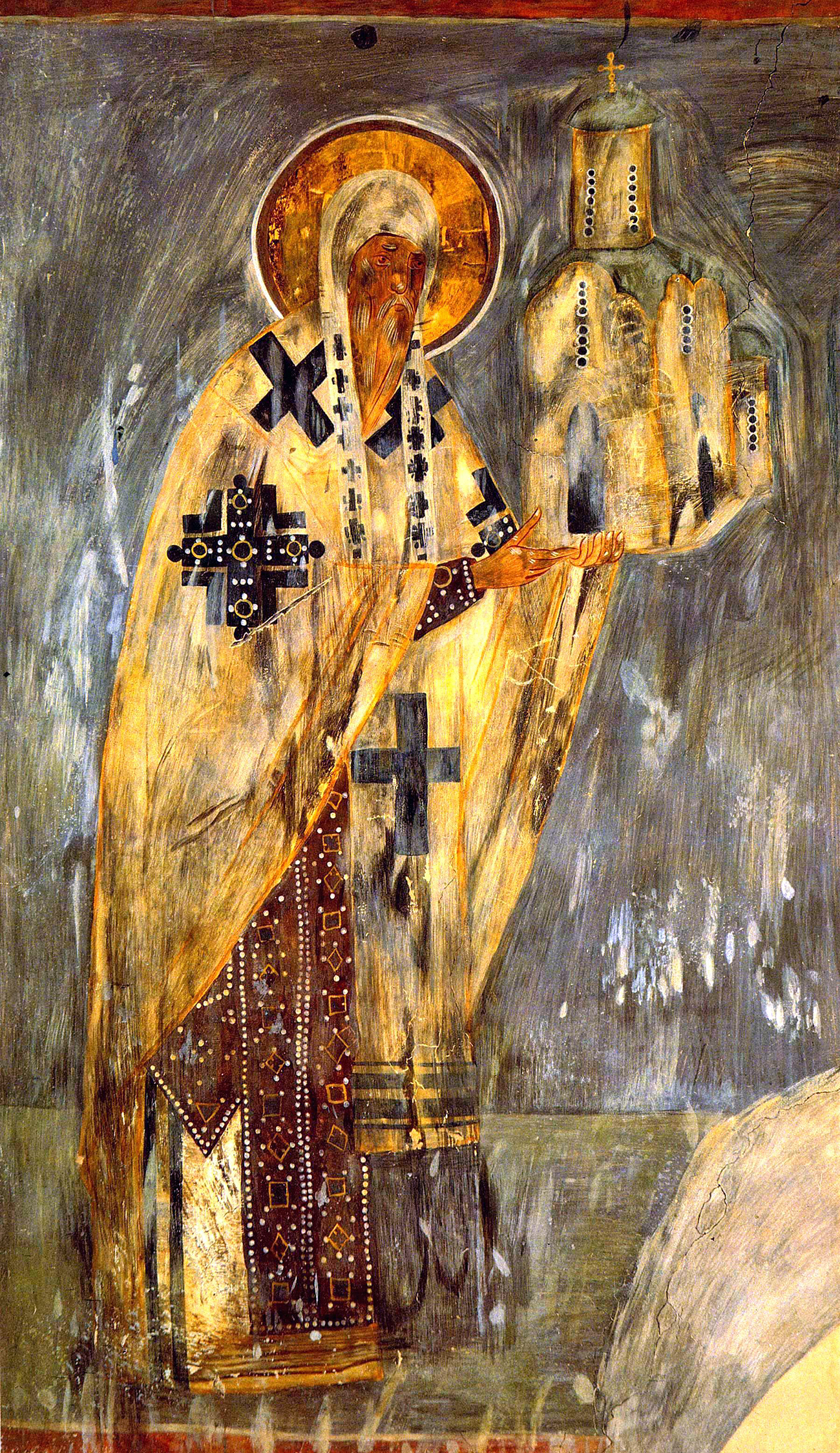
Saint Moses the Wonderworker, Archbishop of Novgorod.

== Sources ==
- April 19 / May 2. Orthodox Calendar (pravoslavie.ru).
- May 2 / April 19. Holy Trinity Russian Orthodox Church (A parish of the Patriarchate of Moscow).
- April 19. OCA - The Lives of the Saints.
- The Autonomous Orthodox Metropolia of Western Europe and the Americas. St. Hilarion Calendar of Saints for the year of our Lord 2004. St. Hilarion Press (Austin, TX). p. 30.
- April 19. Latin Saints of the Orthodox Patriarchate of Rome.
- The Roman Martyrology. Transl. by the Archbishop of Baltimore. Last Edition, According to the Copy Printed at Rome in 1914. Revised Edition, with the Imprimatur of His Eminence Cardinal Gibbons. Baltimore: John Murphy Company, 1916. p. 110.
- Rev. Richard Stanton. A Menology of England and Wales, or, Brief Memorials of the Ancient British and English Saints Arranged According to the Calendar, Together with the Martyrs of the 16th and 17th Centuries. London: Burns & Oates, 1892. pp. 164–168.

Greek Sources

- Great Synaxaristes: (in Greek) 19 Απριλίου. Μεγασ Συναξαριστησ.
- (in Greek) Συναξαριστής. 19 Απριλίου. ecclesia.gr. (H Εκκλησια Τησ Ελλαδοσ).

Russian Sources

- (in Russian) 2 мая (19 апреля). Православная Энциклопедия под редакцией Патриарха Московского и всея Руси Кирилла (электронная версия). (Orthodox Encyclopedia - Pravenc.ru).
- (in Russian) 19 апреля (ст.ст.) 2 мая 2013 (нов. ст.). Русская Православная Церковь Отдел внешних церковных связей.
