= May 3 (Eastern Orthodox liturgics) =

Day in the Eastern Orthodox liturgical calendar

Eastern Orthodox liturgical calendar
May 2	May 3	May 4
May 3 O.S. ≍ May 16 N.S. May 3 N.S ≍ April 20 O.S.

An Eastern Orthodox cross

May 3 in Eastern Orthodox liturgical calendars is a feast day and a day of commemoration of saints and martyrs. Although some Orthodox churches use the Revised Julian Calendar and others use the traditional Julian calendar, the fixed commemorations for their respective May 3 are broadly the same, no matter which calendar is used. (Note: Despite the dates being the same, the days to which they refer typically differ by 13 days. The notation Old Style or O.S. is sometimes used to indicate a date in the traditional Julian Calendar (the "Old Calendar"). The notation New Style or N.S. indicates a date in the Revised Julian calendar (the "New Calendar").)

== Saints ==
- Martyrs Timothy the Reader and his wife Moura (Maura), at Antinoöpolis, Egypt (304)
- Martyrs Diodoros and Rodopianos, at Aphrodisia in Anatolia, by stoning (285-305) (Note: "At Aphrodisia, in Caria, the holy martyrs Diodorus and Rodopian, who were stoned to death by their fellow-citizens, in the persecution of Diocletian.") (see also April 29)
- Martyr Alexander and Virgin Martyr Antonina at Byzantium (313) (see also June 10)
- Great Martyr Xenia the Wonderworker, of Kalamata, Peloponnesus (318)
- Holy 27 Martyrs who died by fire
- Saint Mamai, Catholicos of Georgia (744)
- Saints Michael and Arsenius of Ulompo, Georgia (9th century)
- Saint Peter the Wonderworker, Bishop of Argos, Peloponnese (925)
- Saint Oecumenius (Ecumenius, Ekoumenios) the Wonderworker, Bishop of Trikala (Tricca) (10th century)

== Pre-Schism Western saints ==
- Saint Alexander I, the fifth Pope of Rome (c. 106-115)
- Martyrs Alexander, Eventius and Theodulus (c. 113-119) (Note: Tradition relates that, after a lengthy imprisonment, Pope Saint Alexander I and two priests, Eventius and Theodulus, were burned and then beheaded during Hadrian's persecution. During his imprisonment, Alexander is said to have brought Saint Quirinus and his daughter Saint Balbina to the faith. Today's saints were buried on the Via Nomentana near Rome. Their relics were later translated to the church of Saint Sabina, which now belongs to the Dominicans. Although called Pope Alexander in the Roman Martyrology, all sources agree that this is probably an erroneous listing (Benedictines, Coulson, Delaney, Husenbeth). (The identification of the martyr Alexander with the Pope was removed from the Roman Calendar by Pope John XXIII in 1960.))
- Saint Juvenal of Narni (c. 369/377)
- Saint Glywys (Gluvias) of Cornwall (5th century)
- Saint Scannal of Cell-Coleraine in Ireland, a disciple of Saint Columba (563)
- Saint Adalsindis, sister of Saint Waldalenus, founder of the Monastery of Bèze in France, Abbess of a convent near Bèze (c. 680)
- Saint Æthelwine (Elwin, Ethelwin), Bishop of Lindsey (c. 700)
- Saint Philip of Worms (770) (Philip of Zell)
- Saint Ansfried, Bishop of Utrecht (1010)

== Post-Schism Orthodox saints ==
- Venerable Theodosius, Abbot of the Kiev Far Caves Monastery, and Founder of Cenobitic Monasticism in Russia (1074)
- Saint Theophanes of Vatopedi, Metropolitan of Peritheorion (near Xanthi) (14th century)
- Schema-abbess Juliana (1393) and Schema-nun Eupraxia (1394), of the Monastery of the Conception in Moscow.
- Saint Gregory, Archbishop of Rostov, Yiaroslavl and White Lake (Abbott of Kamennoi Monastery (Monastery of the Transfiguration) at Kubenski Lake, in Vologda province) (1416) (Note: See: (in Russian) Григорий Премудрый. Википедии. (Russian Wikipedia).)
- Martyr Ahmet the Calligrapher of Constantinople (1682)
- Martyr Paul of Vilnius, Lithuania (17th century)
- Saints Silas (1783), Paisius and Nathan (1784), monks of Putna Monastery, Moldova.
- New Martyrs Anastasia and Christodoulos, at Achaea (1821)
- Saint Irodion (Ionescu) of Lainici, Abbot of Lainici Monastery in Romania (1900) (Note: See: (in Romanian) Irodion Ionescu. Wikipedia. (Romanian Wikipedia).)

=== New martyrs and confessors ===
- New Hieromartyr John Vilensky, Priest of Semyonovskoe (1918)
- New Hieromartyr Vladimir Izvolsky, Archpriest, of Manchuria (1930)
- New Hieromartyr Nicholas Benevolsky, Priest of Alma-Ata (1941)

== Other commemorations ==
- Translation of the relics (1011) of Saint Luke of Mt. Stirion (953) (Note: On May 2-3, 2026, the Holy Monastery of St. Luke (Hosios Loukas) in Steiris, Greece, commemorated the 1,015th anniversary of the translation of the relics of St. Luke the Younger and the consecration of its Byzantine katholikon. The abbot of the Holy Monastery of St. Luke, Archimandrite Seraphim (Pavlidis), expressed his gratitude and blessings to the clergy and faithful. At the conclusion, Metropolitan George (Mantzouranis) of Thebes gave a brief address about the translation of the saint’s relics, also noting that 2026 marks 40 years since the return of the saint’s relic from Italy to the monastery in 1986, after an absence of 526 years (i.e. since 1460).) (Note: "Tradition has it that the Hosios' holy relics had been removed during the 13th century by the Crusaders and had been taken to the Vatican. They later surfaced in Venice accompanied by the following legend: when the Turks conquered Boeotia in 1460, a group of monks, carrying the Hosios' relics, found refuge on the island of Lefkada. After the island fell to the Turks, the relics were transported to Bosnia.; In July 1463, Bosnia also fell to the Turks and Franciscan monks transported the holy relics to Venice.; On the 11th October 1986, after 526 years and coordinated efforts by the Diocese of Thebes and Levadia (including Archimandrite Christophoros Rakintzakis), and local officials, a delegation headed by the Bishop of Thebes and Levadia Ieronymos (Liapis), the ex-bishop Nikodimos (Graikos), the then abbot of the Monastery Nikodimos, and the then dean and current abbot Georgios, collected the holy relics and replaced them in the reliquary of the Katholikon at the Monastery of Hosios Loukas, on the 13th December 1986.") (see also: February 7 - feast day)
- Translation of the Dormition Icon of the Mother of God from Constantinople, to the Kiev-Pechersk Far Caves (1073) (Note: See: (in Russian) Киево-Печерская икона Успения Божией Матери. Википедии. (Russian Wikipedia).)
- "Svenskaya" (Kiev Caves) Icon of the Most Holy Theotokos (1288) (Note: See: (in Russian) Свенская Печерская икона Божией Матери. Википедии. (Russian Wikipedia).)
- Finding of the relics (2018) of Saint John (Vilenskiy) of Yaroslavl (1918) (see also: October 28)

== Icon gallery ==
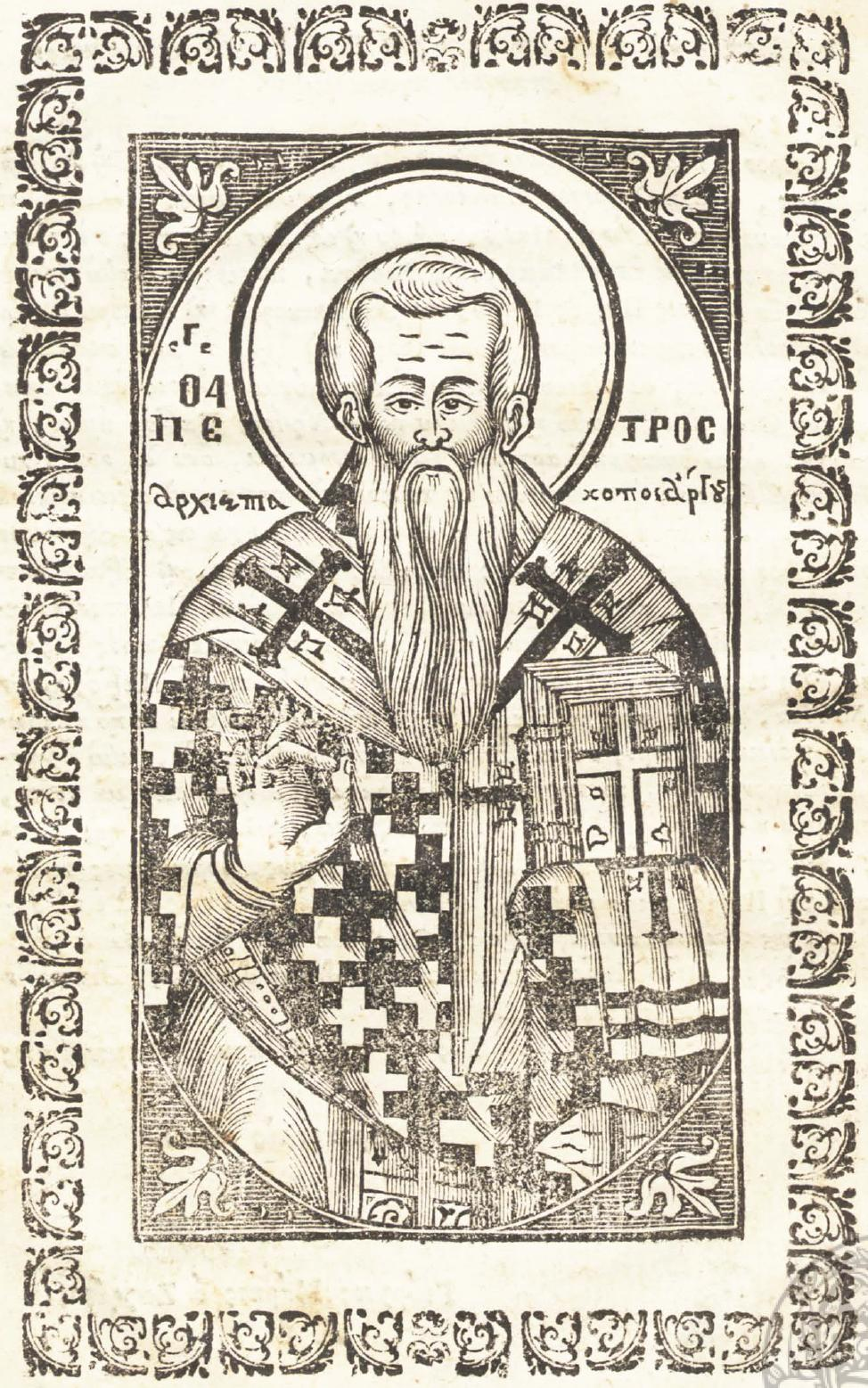
St. Peter the Wonderworker, Bishop of Argolis.

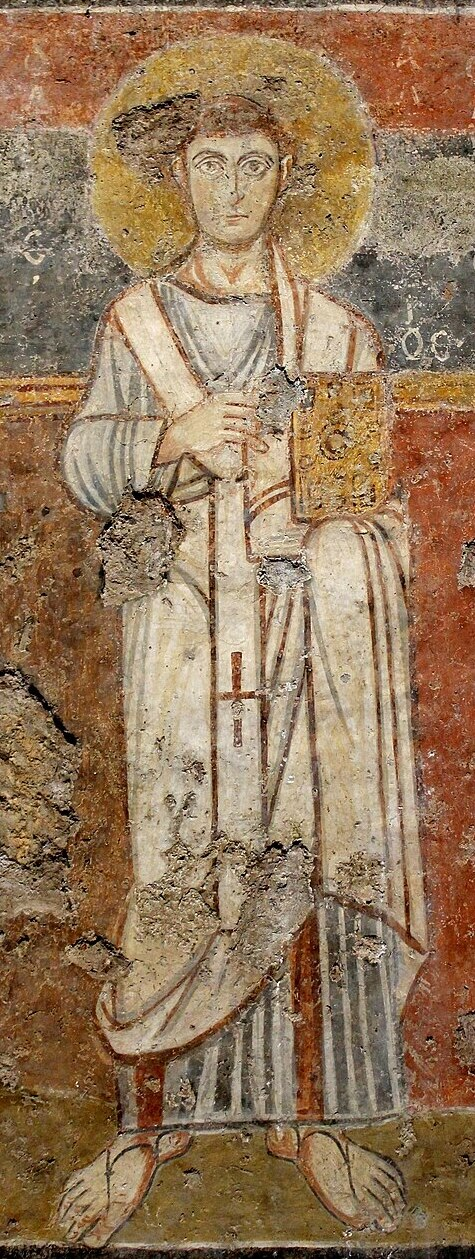
Pope Alexander I, the fifth Pope of Rome (8th-c. fresco from Santa Maria Antiqua)

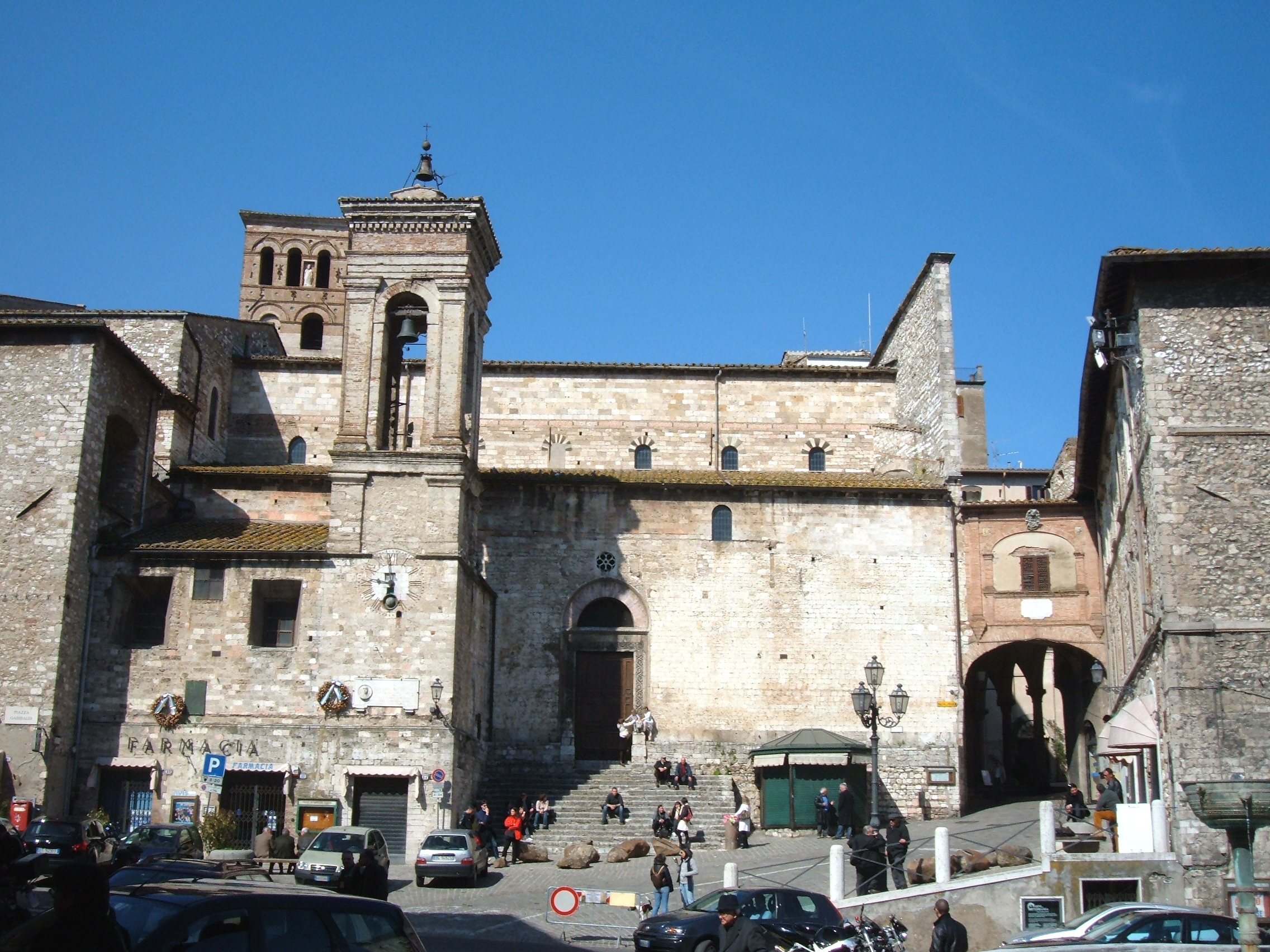
Church of St. Juvenal of Narni (Chiesa di San Giovenale, a Narni).

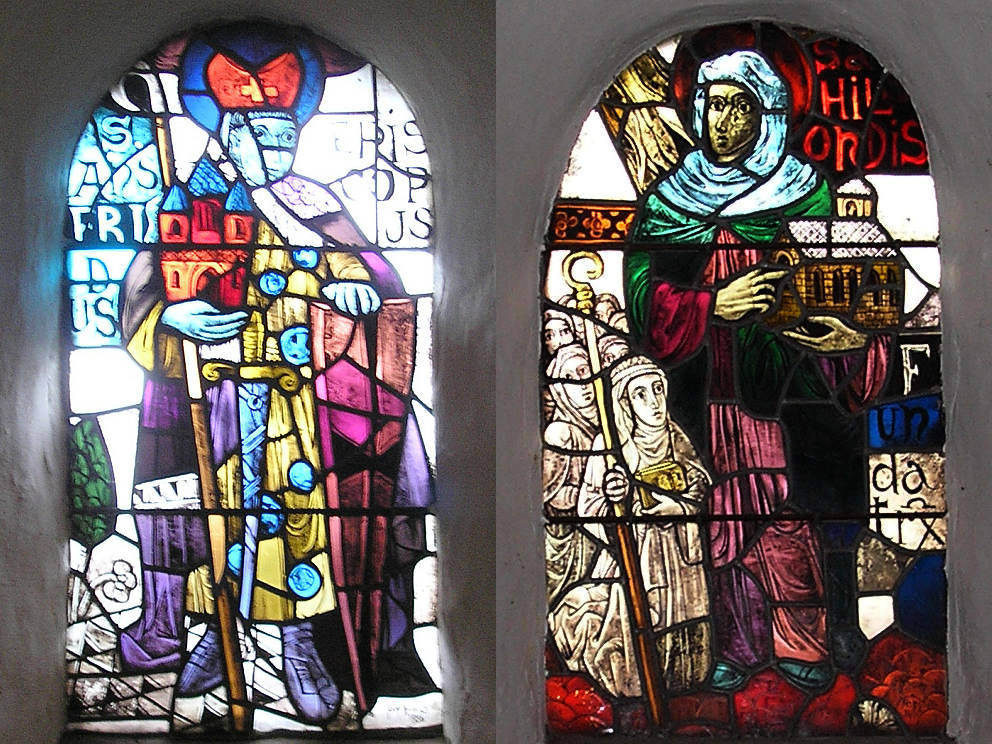
St. Ansfried of Utrecht and his wife Hereswint (or Hilsondis), founders of the abbey of Thorn (Limburg, Netherlands) on two stainded glass windows (1956).

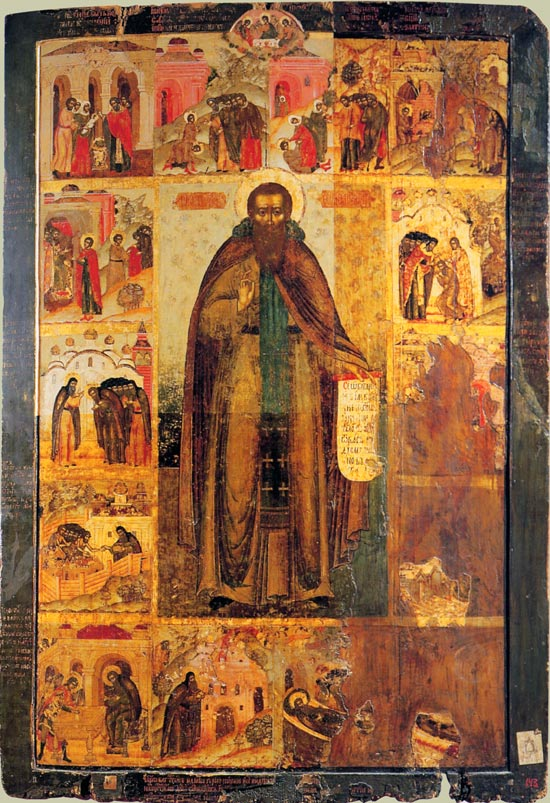
St. Theodosius of Kiev.

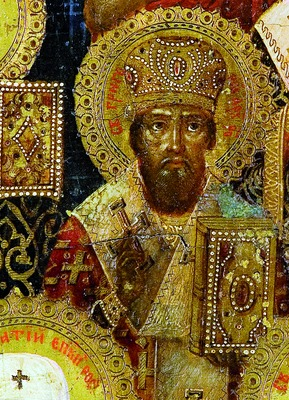
St. Gregory, Archbishop of Rostov, Yiaroslavl and White Lake.

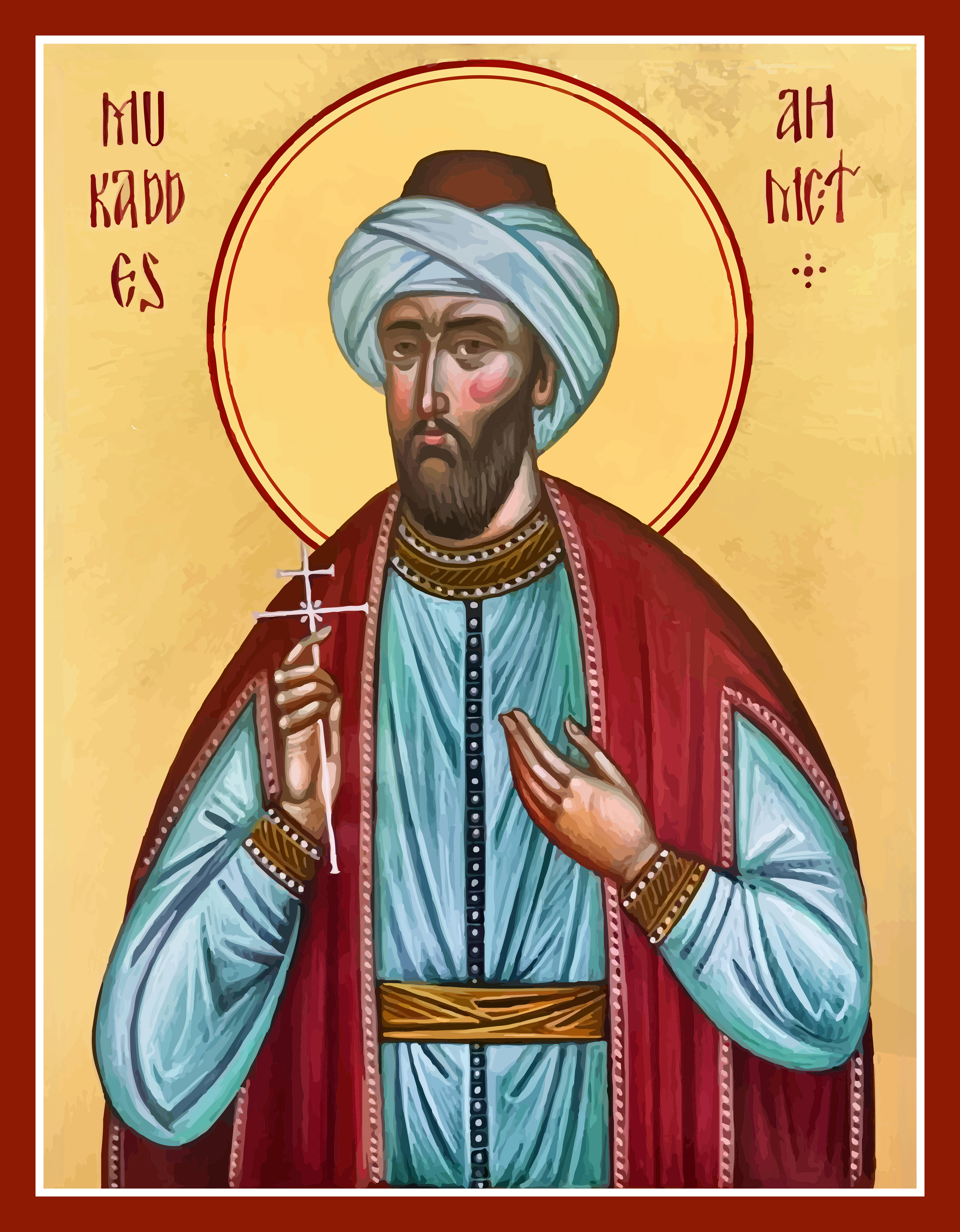
Martyr Ahmet the Calligrapher of Constantinople.

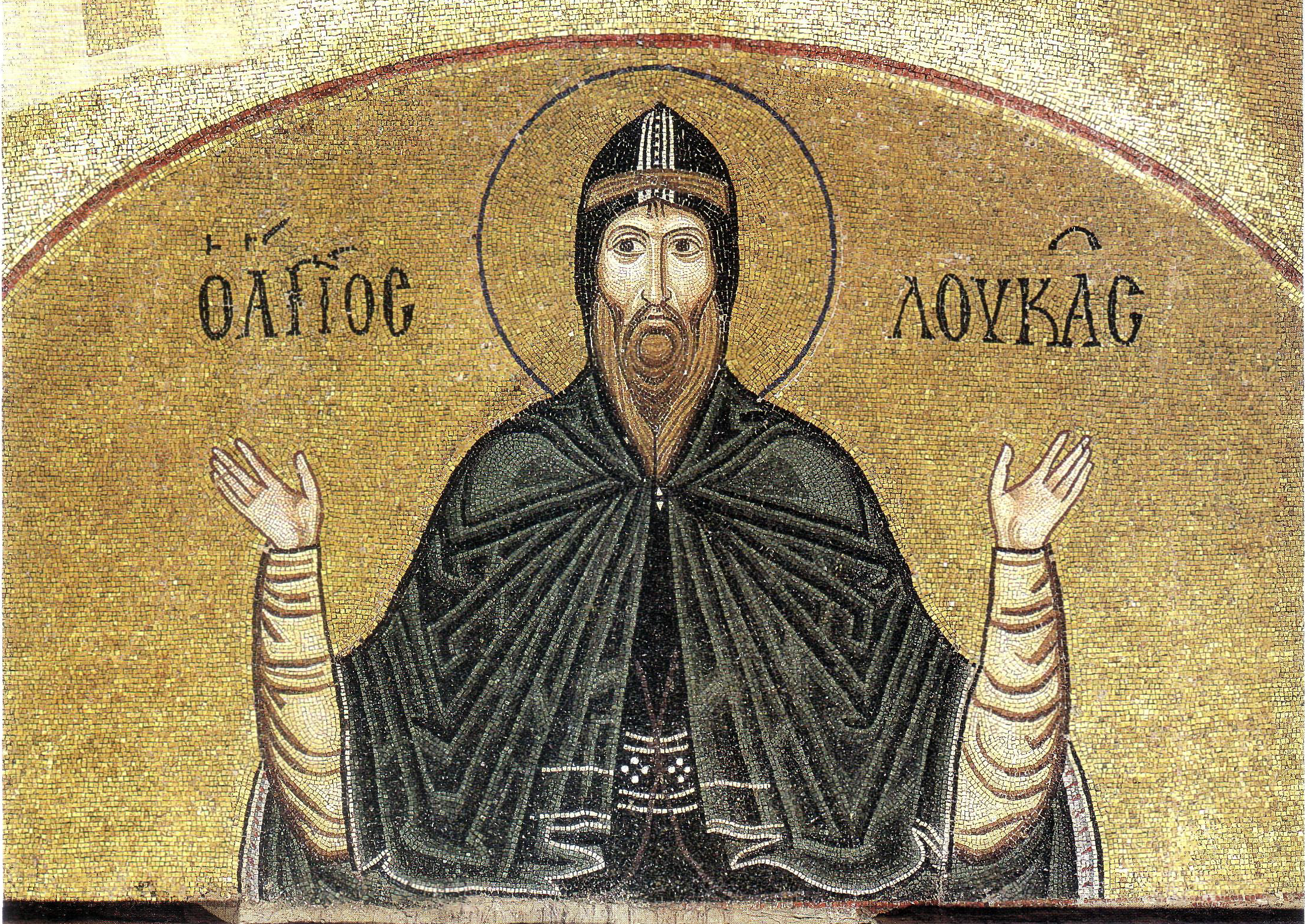
St. Luke of Steiris (Hosios Loukas)

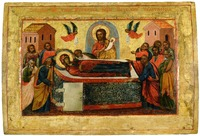
Kiev-Pechersk Icon of the Dormition Icon of the Mother of God.

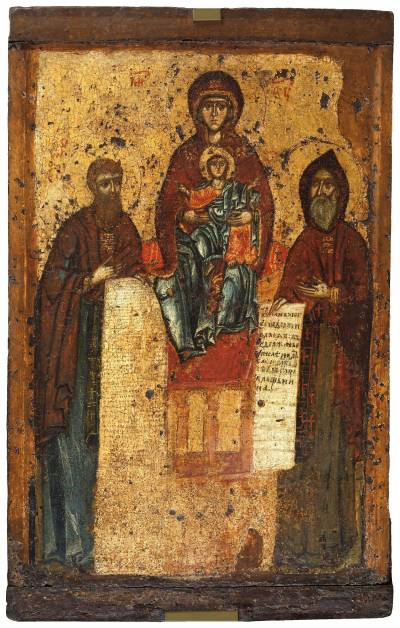
"Svenskaya" (Kiev Caves) Icon of the Most Holy Theotokos.

== Sources ==
- May 3/16, Orthodox Calendar (PRAVOSLAVIE.RU)
- May 16 / May 3, HOLY TRINITY RUSSIAN ORTHODOX CHURCH (A parish of the Patriarchate of Moscow)
- May 3. OCA - The Lives of the Saints.
- AN ENGLISH ORTHODOX CALENDAR
- May 3. Latin Saints of the Orthodox Patriarchate of Rome.
- May 3, The Roman Martyrology.
- The Roman Martyrology. Transl. by the Archbishop of Baltimore. Last Edition, According to the Copy Printed at Rome in 1914. Revised Edition, with the Imprimatur of His Eminence Cardinal Gibbons. Baltimore: John Murphy Company, 1916. pp. 125–126.

Greek Sources

- Great Synaxaristes: (in Greek) 3 ΜΑΪΟΥ, ΜΕΓΑΣ ΣΥΝΑΞΑΡΙΣΤΗΣ.
- (in Greek) Συναξαριστής. 3 Μαΐου. ECCLESIA.GR. (H ΕΚΚΛΗΣΙΑ ΤΗΣ ΕΛΛΑΔΟΣ).

Russian Sources

- (in Russian) 16 мая (3 мая). Православная Энциклопедия под редакцией Патриарха Московского и всея Руси Кирилла (электронная версия). (Orthodox Encyclopedia - Pravenc.ru).
- (in Russian) 3 мая (ст.ст.) 16 мая 2013 (нов. ст.). Русская Православная Церковь Отдел внешних церковных связей. (DECR).
