= Marianus of Auxerre =

Saint Marianus of Auxerre (French: Marien d'Auxerre; died at Easter in around 470) was a monk of Auxerre in Yonne, France. He was considered a saint because of the sanctity of his life and is invoked as a protector of animals. His feast day is 20 April.

== Life ==
Marianus originated in the area of Bourges, but, driven out by invading Goths, took refuge in the Abbey of Saints Cosmas and Damian in Auxerre, later the Abbey of St. Marianus, in the time of Saint Mamertinus, then abbot. He made outstanding progress in the monastic life but the abbot sent him to the monastery's estate in Mézilles ("Meziclis"), where the present parish church is dedicated to him, to look after the livestock. He made a great success of this, and also gained the trust of the wild creatures in the surrounding forest. He was attending the church at Fontenoy, another estate of the abbey, where similarly the present parish church is dedicated to him, for the Easter service in around 470 when he died.

He was buried in the Abbey of Saints Cosmas and Damian which was rededicated to him as the Abbey of St. Marianus. In the time of the Norman invasions in the late 9th century, during which the abbey was destroyed, his relics were moved for safety to the Abbey of Saint-Germain in Auxerre.

== Cult ==
His feast day is 20 April. Marianus is a protector of animals against diseases and attacks by wolves, snakes and so forth. At Mézilles there is an annual pilgrimage involving the blessing of animals in the church and at the nearby fountain.
