= Theotimos =

Theotimos (Θεότιμος) is a Greek name, derived from theos, meaning 'god', and timè, meaning 'honour (or honourable) gift'. Its Latinized form is Theotimus.

Theotimus is also the title of an ascetical theological work by Francis de Sales, which devotes the first six chapters on the love of God and the rest to mystical prayer.

== People ==
- Theotimus, an Eleian boxer. A statue at Olympia was made to honour him. His father, Moschion, accompanied Alexander the Great in his campaign to Asia.
- Theotimus (790), a bishop of Crotone in Italy
- Theotimos (d. 407), a bishop of Tomi
- Theotimus, from Arabia, one of the signatories of an assent to the Nicene Creed
