= Theodore, Philippa and companions =

Christian martyrs crucified in 220 CE

Saints Theodore, Philippa, Dioscorus, Socrates, and Dionysius
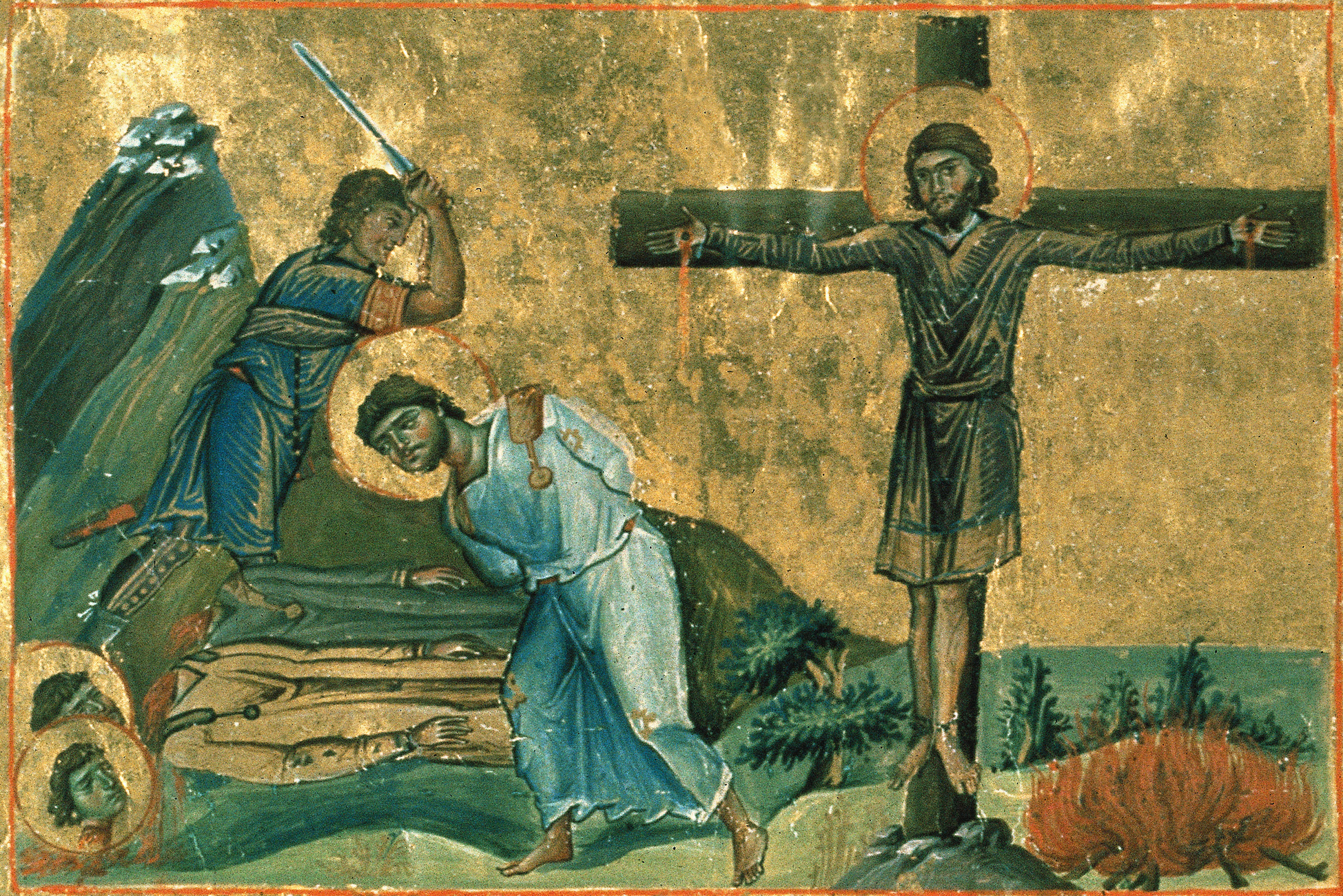

Martyrs
- Died: 220; Pamphylia
- Venerated in: Roman Catholic Church, Eastern Orthodox Church
- Canonized: Pre-congregation
- Feast: 20 September Roman Catholic 21 April Eastern Orthodox

Theodore, Philippa, and companions (died 220) were martyrs, who suffered crucifixion during the reign of Elagabalus.

Theodore of Perge (Greek: Θεόδωρος) was a Roman soldier, and Philippa (Φιλίππα) was his mother. Their companions who suffered martyrdom with them, included Socrates, (Σωκράτης) a fellow soldier and Dionysius (Διονύσιος), a former pagan priest who converted to Christianity. Some sources also list a third companion named Dioscorus (Διόσκορoς).

The Catholic Church commemorates them on 20 September.

The Orthodox Church commemorates them on 21 April; it also dates their deaths as being during the reign of the emperor Antoninus Pius (138-161).
