= Anastasius Sinaita =

Abbot and theologian (died after 700)

Saint Anastasius Sinaita
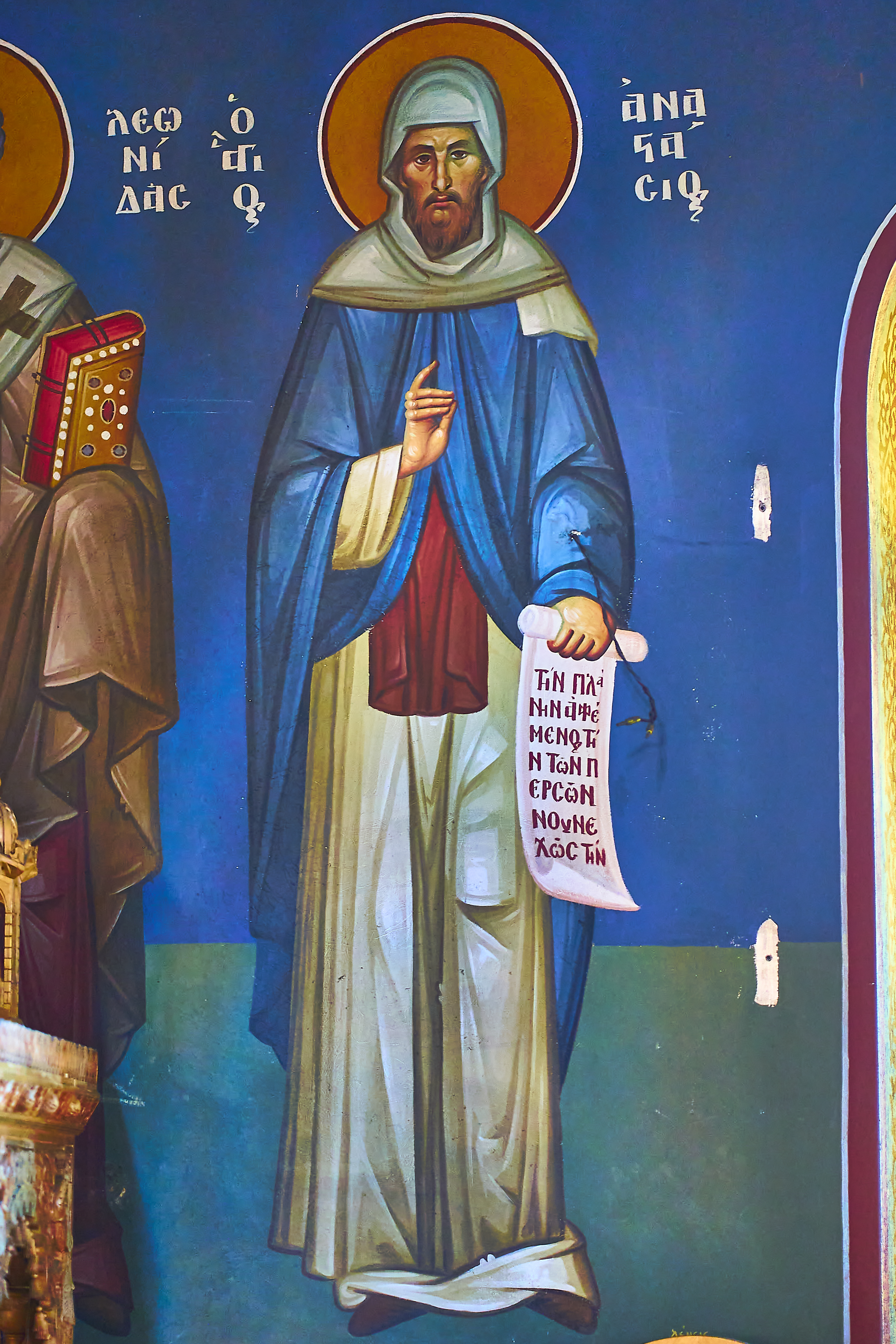
- Icon of St. Anastasius, Church of Panagia Theotokos, Vouliagmenis Avenue

Church Father
- Born: Alexandria
- Died: after 700
- Venerated in: Roman Catholic Church; Eastern Orthodox Church
- Feast: April 21

Anastasius Sinaita (Greek: Ἀναστάσιος ὁ Σιναΐτης; died after 700), also called Anastasius of Sinai or Anastasius the Sinaite, was a Greek writer, priest and abbot of Saint Catherine's Monastery on Mount Sinai.

== Life ==
What little is known about his life is gathered from his own works. In Antiquity, he was often confused with the bishop and writer Anastasius I of Antioch (559–598), and the authorship of various works attributed to Anastasius of Sinai is still vigorously disputed. A canon has been tentatively accepted by modern scholars, but even among these Anastasian works there are spurious sections. His writings concern questions and answers about issues of Christian dogma, ritual, and lifestyle (catechism); sermons; and exegesis. He was fond of tracing the etymologies of key Christian terms; he was erudite in the Bible and early Patristic literature; and he had a pervasive interest in the nature of God and man, especially in the person of Christ (Christology). He was not reluctant to develop and express his own theories about key ecclesiastical issues, which led to later commentaries, emendations, and perhaps even censorship of parts of his works.

== Major works ==
The principal works transmitted under Anastasius' name include the Viae Dux, Quaestiones et Responsiones, Hexaemeron, Homilia i, ii, iii de creatione hominis, and the Narrationes. The Viae Dux - also called the Hodegos (Greek transliteration) and "Guide Along the Right Path" (English translation) - was written in defense of the Chalcedonian Creed. A collection of works by Anastasius, the Viae Dux served to support the true faith and to counter the attacks of heretics, in particular Monophysites.

His Quaestiones et Responsiones ("Questions and Responses") was a popular genre and falls under the category of pastoral theology. It offers advice, largely to the lay community, on spiritual and sacramental matters, charitable donations, marriage, and other subjects. Here Anastasius reveals a distinctly personal tone and offers a window into the day-to-day existence of ordinary people. It is especially significant because it is an eyewitness account of the expansion of Islam into Sinai and Egypt, which were predominantly Christian, and of the effect that Muslim governance had on Christian life and beliefs.

Anastasius was probably the author of the Hexaemeron, a commentary in 12 books about the Genesis creation narrative. (Hexaemeron, sometimes spelled Hexameron, means “six-days”.) In the Hexaemeron Anastasius argues that Moses on Mount Sinai was inspired by the Holy Spirit to write not only the creation narrative, but also in the same text to prophesize the New Creation through Christ. Thus Adam represents Christ and Eve represents the Church. Anastasius' extensive exegesis of the beginning of Genesis draws upon commentaries written by many Fathers of the Church, including Clement of Alexandria, Origen, Gregory of Nyssa, Gregory of Nazianzus, and Pseudo-Dionysius the Areopagite. One reason for some doubts about Anastasius’ authorship is the lack of any surviving manuscript copied before the end of the fifteenth century. The lack of earlier manuscripts, however, could be the result of censorship. The allegorical interpretations of Genesis in the Hexaemeron by Anastasius are in many ways a counterpoint to the more literal Hexaemeron written by Basil the Great.

== See also ==
- Allegory
- Biblical exegesis
- Book of Genesis
- Chalcedonian
- Christian mysticism
- Christology
- Eastern Christianity
- Eastern Orthodox
- List of Catholic saints
- Mount Sinai
- Mysticism
- Patristics
- Saint Catherine, Egypt
- Saint Catherine's Monastery
- Typology (theology)
