= Abbey of St Marianus, Auxerre =

Abbey in Yonne, France

Coordinates: 47.8020°N 3.5766°E

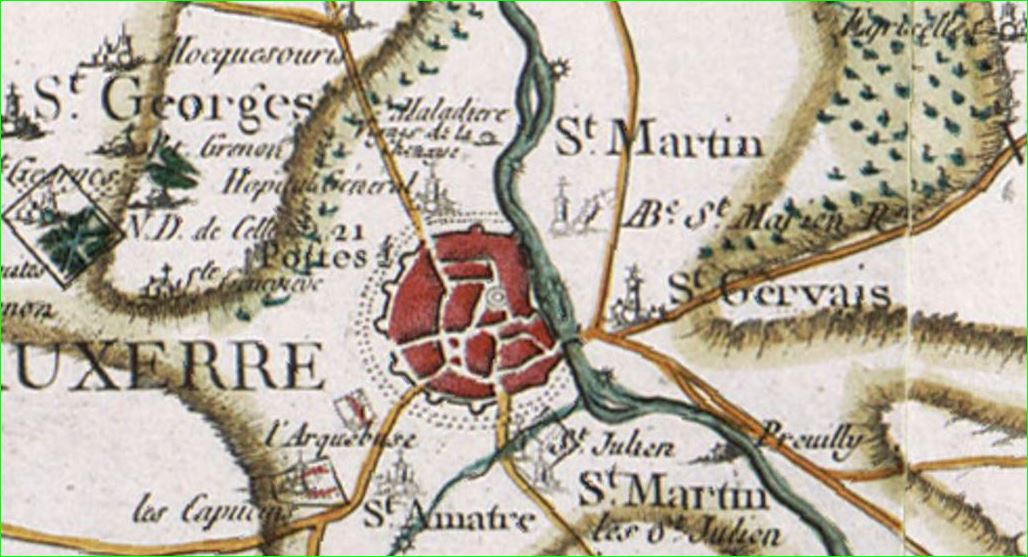
Cassini map of Auxerre of the mid to late 18th century showing the abbey as a ruin, to the north-east of the city

The Abbey of St. Marianus (French: Abbaye Saint-Marien d'Auxerre) was a Benedictine, later Premonstratensian, monastery in Auxerre in the French department of Yonne in Burgundy. Established in the fifth century, it was the first monastery established in the diocese.

== History ==
The abbey was founded as a Benedictine monastery dedicated to Saints Cosmas and Damian, but was later rededicated to Saint Marianus. It was destroyed during the Norman invasions of the 9th century. In the 11th century, it was rebuilt as a Premonstratensian abbey, which was destroyed in 1570.

The Abbey of St. Marianus was the first of four "daughter" foundations of Auxerre Cathedral, followed by those dedicated to Saint Eusebius, Saint Père (Saint Peter) and Saint Amator (Amâtre).

== Abbots ==
- 430 (est.): Saint Aloge (Alodius or Saint Aleu).
- 440 (est.): Saint Mamert
- 1139–1146: Rainier, died 28 February 1146, abbot before the first group of monks arrives in 1149.
- 1146–1147: Bertolde (died Beginning February 1147), from Cologne.
- 1147–1155: Osbert, abbot for 8 years, retired in 1155.
- 1163 Milon de Trainel, abbot of Saint Marien, asked King Louis VII to fortify the abbey in exchange for land to preserve the religious "Vaul Parfunde" against incursions of all kinds. He rebuilt St. Marien next to the Church of St. Martin.
- 1209–1222: Norbert, elected in 1209. Norbert is mentioned in the 67th letter of Gervais, which discusses that St. Marien is in debt and some wish to not build a dining hall.
- 1223: Rainier II attends a judgment in Saint-Fargeau against the Count de Mello in favor of the cathedral
- 1239: Hulderus (Sometimes called "Hugh") is mentioned in a charter of Gautier, regarding the agreement between the inhabitants of Bassou and their priest
- 1246: Guillaume sells a tenement of Auxerre
- Étienne, also an abbot of Saint-Paul
- before 1264–1269: Guerric (died 1278), Burgundinian by birth, elected in 1269. Known for his world chronicle which recorded history as far back as 1190 and was later published in 1608.
- before 1281 – after 1288: Jean attends the tribute of the Count of Flanders (hommage du Comte de Flandre) in 1281.
- 1291 – Unknown : Henri
- 1302: Martin Blake is appointed in arbitration proceedings for Chapter Auxerre
- 1305: Henri II assists the general chapter
- 1320: Martin
- 1322: François
- before 1358 – after 1360: Etienne II acknowledges the abbey's debt to the monks of Saint-Germain, who paid the ransom demanded by the English at Auxerre.
- before 1364 – after 1380: Jean II compromises in 1364 with Étienne de Chitry, Abbé de Saint-Germain.
- 1402–1419: Richard Colas (died 13 November 1419), previously pastor of Notre-Dame-La-D'Hors. Elected ecclesiastical governor of City Hall in 1411 and 1412. His grave was found in 1715 in the Church of the Notre-Dame-La-D'Hors and brought to St. Martin.
- Unknown – 1456: Pierre Aulard (died 20 March 1456) was excommunicated in 1423 by the bishop of Auxerre Philippe Dessessart for failing to attend the synod of 1423; he is absolved ad cautelam a few years later by the Abbot of St. Genevieve, curator of the privileges of the order of Norbertine.
- 1457–1479: Jean Veraudat (died 15 August 1479), born in Appoigny. Ecclesiastical governor of the town hall in 1477 and 1478.
- 1479–1496: Jean Bourgeois, elected abbot on 31 August 1479. Jean Baillet was the bishop at the time, and blessed him in Paris during October 1479. In 1485, he formed the Council of Sens. In 1496, he chose a co-Adjuteur (an assistant to a bishop) and died six days later.
- 1496 - c.1540: Nicolas Sacra (died 31 October 1542), from an old family of Auxerre, was chosen as co-Adjuteur of Father John. Focused on order, he reformed a large number of houses as the General Chapter in 1498 and the Abbot of Prémontré in 1511. Ecclesiastical governor of the City Hall in 1518.
- c.1540 - c.1552: Arnoul Gonthier
- c.1552 – 1561: Pierre Fournier, a noble of Auvergne, became bishop of Périgueux in 1561.
- c.1564 - c.1567: Michel de Clugny
- Unknown – 1579: François Guerry
- 1579–1583: Jean Lourdereaux
- 1583–1598: Jean Lourdereaux (died 1598), brother of the previous abbot.
- 1598–1627: Edme Martin (died 6 December 1627)
- 1628–1639: Nicolas de Castille, son of Pierre de Castille
- 1639–1670 or 1671: Henri de Castille (1670 or 1671), son of Pierre de Castille
- 1671–1719: Henri de Baraille (beginning 1719)
- 1719–1735: Nicolas-Joseph Racine (died 6 August 1735)
- 1735–1746: Jerome Lefebvre de Laubrière (died 1746), vicar general of his brother Francois de Laubrière, the Bishop of Soissons.
- 1746–1771: Dubreil de Pontbriand
- 1771 – Unknown: René Clemenceau, Jesuit and last abbot of Saint-Marien.
