= April 8 =

April 8 this year in various calendars
- Wednesday, 8 April 2026
Akan	Kuruwukuo
Armenian	22 Ahekani 1475
Aztec	Tlaxochimaco 8, 11 Cōzcacuāuhtli
Babylonian	19 Adaru, 2336 SE
Balinese pawukon	Luang, Pepet, Pasah, Menala, Keliwon, Paniron, Buda of Sinta, Yama, Dangu, Manuh
Bengali	25 Chaitro, BS 1432
Chinese	Yang Water Rat・Winnowing Basket Mansion; Fire Horse Year, Month 2, Day 21 (Qingming, 12 days until Guyu)
Common Era	8 April 2026 CE
Coptic	30 Paremhat, AM 1742
Egyptian	27 Mesori, 2774 NE
Ethiopian	30 Magābit, 2018 Amätä Məhrät
French Republican	Décade II, Nonidi de Germinal de l'Année 234 de la République
Gregorian	8 April, AD 2026
Hebrew	21 Nisan, AM 5786; Omer 6
Hindu	Mūla・Varīyas; Solar: 26 Caitra, 1947 SE; Lunisolar: Ṣaṣṭhī, Kṛishna pakṣa of Caitra, 2083 VE; Rāudra・5126 KY・1,872,673
Icelandic	Miðvikudagur, 16 Einmánuður 2025
Islamic	20 Shawwal, AH 1447 (using tabular method)
ISO week date	2026-W15-3
Japanese	21 Kisaragi, Reiwa 8 (Seimei, 12 days until Kokuu)
Julian	26 March, AD 2026 (AM 7534)
Julian day	2461139
Korean	21 Tokkidal, 4359 DE
Maya	13.0.13.8.16; 9 Pop, 11 Cib
Roman	ante diem VII Kalendas Apriles, MMDCCLXXIX AUC
Solar Hijri	19 Farvardin, SH 1405
Tibetan	21 dbo, me pho rta 2153 or 1772 or 1000

<<	April					>>
Su	Mo	Tu	We	Th	Fr	Sa
			1	2	3	4
5	6	7	8	9	10	11
12	13	14	15	16	17	18
19	20	21	22	23	24	25
26	27	28	29	30
2026

April 8 in recent years
2026 (Wednesday)
2025 (Tuesday)
2024 (Monday)
2023 (Saturday)
2022 (Friday)
2021 (Thursday)
2020 (Wednesday)
2019 (Monday)
2018 (Sunday)
2017 (Saturday)

April 8 is the 98th day of the year (99th in leap years) in the Gregorian calendar; 267 days remain until the end of the year.

== Events ==
=== Pre-1600 ===
- 217 – Roman emperor Caracalla is assassinated and is succeeded by his Praetorian Guard prefect, Marcus Opellius Macrinus.
- 876 – The Battle of Dayr al-'Aqul saves Baghdad from the Saffarids.
- 1139 – Roger II of Sicily is excommunicated by Innocent II for supporting Anacletus II as pope for seven years, even though Roger had already publicly recognized Innocent's claim to the papacy.
- 1143 – Manuel I Komnenos succeeds his father John II Komnenos as Byzantine Emperor.
- 1232 – Mongol–Jin War: The Mongols begin their siege on Kaifeng, the capital of the Jin dynasty.
- 1250 – Seventh Crusade: Ayyubids of Egypt capture King Louis IX of France in the Battle of Fariskur.
- 1271 – Fall of Krak des Chevaliers: In Syria, sultan Baibars conquers the Krak des Chevaliers.

=== 1601–1900 ===
- 1605 – The city of Oulu, Finland, is founded by Charles IX of Sweden.
- 1730 – Shearith Israel, the first synagogue in continental North America, is dedicated.
- 1812 – Czar Alexander I, the Russian Emperor and the Grand Duke of Finland, officially announces the transfer of the status of the Finnish capital from Turku to Helsinki.
- 1820 – The Venus de Milo is discovered on the Aegean island of Milos.
- 1832 – Black Hawk War: Around 300 United States 6th Infantry troops leave St. Louis, Missouri to fight the Sauk Native Americans.
- 1866 – Austro-Prussian War: Italy and Prussia sign a secret alliance against the Austrian Empire.
- 1886 – William Ewart Gladstone introduces the first Irish Home Rule Bill into the British House of Commons.
- 1895 – In Pollock v. Farmers' Loan & Trust Co. the Supreme Court of the United States declares unapportioned income tax to be unconstitutional.

=== 1901–present ===
- 1904 – The French Third Republic and the United Kingdom of Great Britain and Ireland sign the Entente cordiale.
- 1933 – The Australian state of Western Australia votes to secede from the federation in a non-binding referendum, although efforts to implement the result prove unsuccessful.
- 1940 – The Central Committee of the Mongolian People's Revolutionary Party elects Yumjaagiin Tsedenbal as General Secretary, marking the beginning of his 44-year-long tenure as de facto leader of Mongolia.
- 1954 – A Royal Canadian Air Force Canadair Harvard collides with a Trans-Canada Airlines Canadair North Star over Moose Jaw, Saskatchewan, killing 37 people.
- 1954 – South African Airways Flight 201: A de Havilland DH.106 Comet 1 crashes into the sea during night killing 21 people.
- 1959 – A team of computer manufacturers, users, and university people led by Grace Hopper meets to discuss the creation of a new programming language that would be called COBOL.
- 1959 – The Organization of American States drafts an agreement to create the Inter-American Development Bank.
- 1960 – The Netherlands and West Germany sign an agreement to negotiate the return of German land annexed by the Dutch in return for 280 million German marks as Wiedergutmachung.
- 1968 – BOAC Flight 712 catches fire shortly after takeoff. As a result of her actions in the accident, Barbara Jane Harrison is awarded a posthumous George Cross, the only GC awarded to a woman in peacetime.
- 1970 – Bahr El-Baqar primary school bombing: Israeli bombers strike an Egyptian school. Forty-six children are killed.
- 1974 – Hank Aaron passes Babe Ruth as the all-time leader in career home runs by hitting his 715th home run off of Al Downing at Atlanta-Fulton County Stadium.
- 1975 – Voyageurs National Park is established by the U.S. Congress.
- 1990 – The conservative New Democracy party of Constantine Mitsotakis is elected in the Greek parliamentary election.
- 1993 – The Space Shuttle Discovery is launched on mission STS-56.
- 2002 – The Space Shuttle Atlantis is launched on mission STS-110, carrying the S0 truss to the International Space Station. Astronaut Jerry L. Ross also becomes the first person to fly on seven spaceflights.
- 2005 – A solar eclipse occurs, visible over areas of the Pacific Ocean and Latin American countries such as Costa Rica, Panama, Colombia and Venezuela.
- 2010 – U.S. President Barack Obama and Russian President Dmitry Medvedev sign the New START Treaty.
- 2014 – Windows XP reaches its standard End Of Life and is no longer supported.
- 2020 – Bernie Sanders ends his presidential campaign, leaving Joe Biden as the Democratic Party's nominee.
- 2024 – Solar eclipse: A total solar eclipse takes place at the Moon's ascending node, visible across North America.
- 2026 – Operation Eternal Darkness: Hours after a ceasefire to the Iran war, Israeli attacks on Lebanon kill at least 357 and injures more than 1200 people in the largest airstrikes of the Lebanon war.

== Births ==
=== Pre-1600 ===
- 1320 – Peter I of Portugal (died 1367)
- 1408 – Jadwiga of Lithuania, Polish princess (died 1431)
- 1435 – John Clifford, 9th Baron de Clifford, English noble (died 1461)
- 1533 – Claudio Merulo, Italian organist and composer (died 1604)
- 1536 – Barbara of Hesse (died 1597)
- 1541 – Michele Mercati, Italian physician and archaeologist (died 1593)
- 1580 – William Herbert, 3rd Earl of Pembroke, English noble, courtier and patron of the arts (died 1630)
- 1596 – Juan van der Hamen, Spanish artist (died 1631)

=== 1601–1900 ===
- 1605 – Philip IV of Spain (died 1665)
- 1605 – Mary Stuart, English-Scottish princess (died 1607)
- 1641 – Henry Sydney, 1st Earl of Romney, English general and politician, Secretary of State for the Northern Department (died 1704)
- 1692 – Giuseppe Tartini, Italian violinist and composer (died 1770)
- 1726 – Lewis Morris, American judge and politician (died 1798)
- 1732 – David Rittenhouse, American astronomer and mathematician (died 1796)
- 1761 – William Joseph Chaminade, French priest, founded the Society of Mary (died 1850)
- 1770 – John Thomas Campbell, Irish-Australian banker and politician (died 1830)
- 1798 – Dionysios Solomos, Greek poet and author (died 1857)
- 1818 – Christian IX, King of Denmark (died 1906)
- 1818 – August Wilhelm von Hofmann, German chemist and academic (died 1892)
- 1826 – Pancha Carrasco, Costa Rican soldier (died 1890)
- 1827 – Ramón Emeterio Betances, Puerto Rican ophthalmologist, journalist, and politician (died 1898)
- 1842 – Elizabeth Bacon Custer, American author and educator (died 1933)
- 1859 – Edmund Husserl, German Jewish-Austrian mathematician and philosopher (died 1938)
- 1864 – Carlos Deltour, French rower and rugby player (died 1920)
- 1867 – Allen Butler Talcott, American painter and educator (died 1908)
- 1869 – Harvey Cushing, American surgeon and academic (died 1939)
- 1871 – Clarence Hudson White, American photographer and educator (died 1925)
- 1874 – Manuel Díaz, Cuban fencer (died 1929)
- 1874 – Stanisław Taczak, Polish general (died 1960)
- 1875 – Albert I of Belgium (died 1934)
- 1882 (O.S. 27 March) – Dmytro Doroshenko, Lithuanian-Ukrainian historian and politician, Minister of Foreign Affairs of Ukraine and Prime Minister of Ukraine (died 1951)
- 1883 – R. P. Keigwin, English cricketer and academic (died 1972)
- 1883 – Julius Seljamaa, Estonian journalist and politician, Minister of Foreign Affairs of Estonia (died 1936)
- 1885 – Dimitrios Levidis, Greek-French soldier, composer, and educator (died 1951)
- 1886 – Margaret Ayer Barnes, American author and playwright (died 1967)
- 1888 – Dennis Chávez, American journalist and politician (died 1962)
- 1889 – Adrian Boult, English conductor (died 1983)
- 1892 – Richard Neutra, Austrian-American architect, designer of the Los Angeles County Hall of Records (died 1970)
- 1892 – Mary Pickford, Canadian-American actress, producer, screenwriter and co-founder of United Artists (died 1979)
- 1896 – Yip Harburg, American composer (died 1981)
- 1900 – Marie Byles, Australian solicitor (died 1979)

=== 1901–present ===
- 1902 – Andrew Irvine, English mountaineer and explorer (died 1924)
- 1902 – Maria Maksakova Sr., Russian soprano (died 1974)
- 1904 – John Hicks, English economist and academic, Nobel Prize laureate (died 1989)
- 1904 – Hirsch Jacobs, American horse trainer (died 1970)
- 1905 – Joachim Büchner, German sprinter and graphic designer (died 1978)
- 1905 – Helen Joseph, English-South African activist (died 1992)
- 1905 – Erwin Keller, German field hockey player (died 1971)
- 1906 – Raoul Jobin, Canadian tenor and educator (died 1974)
- 1908 – Hugo Fregonese, Argentinian director and screenwriter (died 1987)
- 1909 – John Fante, American author and screenwriter (died 1983)
- 1910 – George Musso, American football player and police officer (died 2000)
- 1911 – Melvin Calvin, American chemist and academic, Nobel Prize laureate (died 1997)
- 1911 – Emil Cioran, Romanian-French philosopher and academic (died 1995)
- 1912 – Alois Brunner, Austrian-German SS officer (died 2001 or 2010)
- 1912 – Sonja Henie, Norwegian-American figure skater and actress (died 1969)
- 1914 – María Félix, Yaqui/Basque-Mexican actress (died 2002)
- 1915 – Ivan Supek, Croatian physicist, philosopher and writer (died 2007)
- 1917 – Winifred Asprey, American mathematician and computer scientist (died 2007)
- 1917 – Lloyd Bott, Australian public servant (died 2004)
- 1917 – Hubertus Ernst, Dutch bishop (died 2017)
- 1917 – Grigori Kuzmin, Russian-Estonian astronomer (died 1988)
- 1918 – Betty Ford, American wife of Gerald Ford, 40th First Lady of the United States (died 2011)
- 1918 – Glendon Swarthout, American author and academic (died 1992)
- 1919 – Ian Smith, Zimbabwean lieutenant and politician, 1st Prime Minister of Rhodesia (died 2007)
- 1921 – Franco Corelli, Italian tenor and actor (died 2003)
- 1920 – Carmen McRae, American singer-songwriter, pianist, and actress (died 1994)
- 1921 – Jan Novák, Czech composer (died 1984)
- 1921 – Herman van Raalte, Dutch footballer (died 2013)
- 1923 – George Fisher, American cartoonist (died 2003)
- 1923 – Edward Mulhare, Irish-American actor (died 1997)
- 1924 – Frédéric Back, German-Canadian animator, director, and screenwriter (died 2013)
- 1924 – Anthony Farrar-Hockley, English general and historian (died 2006)
- 1924 – Kumar Gandharva, Hindustani classical singer (died 1992)
- 1924 – Sara Northrup Hollister, American occultist (died 1997)
- 1926 – Henry N. Cobb, American architect and academic, co-founded Pei Cobb Freed & Partners (died 2020)
- 1926 – Shecky Greene, American comedian (died 2023)
- 1926 – Jürgen Moltmann, German theologian and academic (died 2024)
- 1927 – Tilly Armstrong, English author (died 2010)
- 1927 – Ollie Mitchell, American trumpet player and bandleader (died 2013)
- 1928 – Fred Ebb, American lyricist (died 2004)
- 1929 – Jacques Brel, Belgian singer-songwriter and actor (died 1978)
- 1929 – Renzo De Felice, Italian historian and author (died 1996)
- 1930 – Carlos Hugo, Duke of Parma (died 2010)
- 1931 – John Gavin, American actor and diplomat, United States Ambassador to Mexico (died 2018)
- 1931 – Jack Le Goff, French equestrian (died 2009)
- 1932 – Iskandar of Johor (died 2010)
- 1933 – James Lockhart, American scholar of colonial Latin America, especially Nahua peoples (died 2014)
- 1934 – Kisho Kurokawa, Japanese architect, designed the Nakagin Capsule Tower and Singapore Flyer (died 2007)
- 1935 – Oscar Zeta Acosta, American lawyer and politician (died 1974)
- 1935 – Albert Bustamante, American soldier, educator, and politician (died 2021)
- 1936 – Ghassan Kanafani, Palestinian author and politician (died 1972)
- 1937 – Tony Barton, English footballer and manager (died 1993)
- 1937 – Seymour Hersh, American journalist and author
- 1937 – Momo Kapor, Serbian author and painter (died 2010)
- 1938 – Kofi Annan, Ghanaian economist and diplomat, 7th Secretary-General of the United Nations (died 2018)
- 1938 – John Hamm, Canadian physician and politician, 25th Premier of Nova Scotia (died 2026)
- 1938 – Mary W. Gray, American mathematician, statistician, and lawyer
- 1939 – Manolis Angelopoulos, Greek singer, composer and songwriter (died 1989)
- 1939 – John Arbuthnott, Scottish microbiologist and academic (died 2023)
- 1939 – Trina Schart Hyman, American author and illustrator (died 2004)
- 1939 – Martin J. Schreiber, American politician, 39th Governor of Wisconsin
- 1940 – John Havlicek, American basketball player (died 2019)
- 1941 – Vivienne Westwood, English fashion designer (died 2022)
- 1942 – Tony Banks, Baron Stratford, Northern Irish politician, Minister for Sport and the Olympics (died 2006)
- 1942 – Roger Chapman, English singer-songwriter and guitarist
- 1942 – Douglas Trumbull, American director, producer, and special effects artist (died 2022)
- 1943 – Michael Bennett, American dancer, choreographer, and director (died 1987)
- 1943 – Miller Farr, American football player (died 2023)
- 1943 – James Herbert, English author and illustrator (died 2013)
- 1943 – Chris Orr, English painter and illustrator
- 1944 – Hywel Bennett, Welsh actor (died 2017)
- 1944 – Odd Nerdrum, Swedish-Norwegian painter and illustrator
- 1945 – Derrick Walker, Scottish businessman
- 1945 – Jang Yong, South Korean actor
- 1946 – Catfish Hunter, American baseball player (died 1999)
- 1946 – Tim Thomerson, American actor and producer
- 1947 – Tom DeLay, American lawyer and politician
- 1947 – Steve Howe, English guitarist, songwriter, and producer
- 1947 – Pascal Lamy, French businessman and politician, European Commissioner for Trade
- 1947 – Larry Norman, American singer-songwriter, and producer (died 2008)
- 1948 – Barbara Young, Baroness Young of Old Scone, Scottish academic and politician
- 1949 – K. C. Kamalasabayson, Sri Lankan lawyer and politician, 39th Attorney General of Sri Lanka (died 2007)
- 1949 – John Madden, English director and producer
- 1949 – Brenda Russell, African-American-Canadian singer-songwriter and keyboard player
- 1949 – John Scott, English sociologist and academic
- 1950 – Grzegorz Lato, Polish footballer and coach
- 1951 – Gerd Andres, German politician
- 1951 – Geir Haarde, Icelandic economist, journalist, and politician, 23rd Prime Minister of Iceland
- 1951 – Mel Schacher, American bass player
- 1951 – Joan Sebastian, Mexican singer-songwriter and actor (died 2015)
- 1951 – Phil Schaap, American jazz disc jockey and historian (died 2021)
- 1952 – Ahmet Piriştina, Turkish politician (died 2004)
- 1954 – Gary Carter, American baseball player and coach (died 2012)
- 1954 – Princess Lalla Amina of Morocco (died 2012)
- 1954 – G.V. Loganathan, Indian-American engineer and academic (died 2007)
- 1955 – Gerrie Coetzee, South African boxer (died 2023)
- 1955 – Ron Johnson, American businessman and politician
- 1955 – Barbara Kingsolver, American novelist, essayist and poet
- 1955 – David Wu, Taiwanese-American lawyer and politician
- 1956 – Michael Benton, Scottish-English paleontologist and academic
- 1956 – Christine Boisson, French actress
- 1956 – Roman Dragoun, Czech singer-songwriter and keyboard player
- 1958 – Detlef Bruckhoff, German footballer
- 1958 – Tom Petranoff, American javelin thrower and coach
- 1959 – Alain Bondue, French cyclist
- 1960 – John Schneider, American actor and country singer
- 1961 – Richard Hatch, American reality contestant
- 1961 – Brian McDermott, English footballer and manager
- 1962 – Paddy Lowe, English engineer
- 1962 – Izzy Stradlin, American guitarist and songwriter
- 1963 – Tine Asmundsen, Norwegian bassist
- 1963 – Julian Lennon, English singer-songwriter
- 1963 – Dean Norris, American actor
- 1963 – Terry Porter, American basketball player and coach
- 1963 – Donita Sparks, American singer-songwriter and guitarist
- 1963 – Alec Stewart, English cricketer
- 1964 – Biz Markie, American rapper, producer, and actor (died 2021)
- 1964 – John McGinlay, Scottish footballer and manager
- 1965 – Steven Blaney, Canadian businessman and politician, 5th Canadian Minister of Public Safety
- 1965 – Michael Jones, New Zealand rugby player and coach
- 1966 – Iveta Bartošová, Czech singer and actress (died 2014)
- 1966 – Mark Blundell, English race car driver
- 1966 – Andy Currier, English rugby league player
- 1966 – Charlotte Dawson, New Zealand-Australian television host (died 2014)
- 1966 – Dalton Grant, English high jumper
- 1966 – Mazinho, Brazilian footballer, coach, and manager
- 1966 – Harri Rovanperä, Finnish race car driver
- 1966 – Evripidis Stylianidis, Greek lawyer and politician, Greek Minister for the Interior
- 1966 – Robin Wright, American actress, director, producer
- 1967 – Kenny Benjamin, Antiguan cricketer
- 1968 – Patricia Arquette, American actress and director
- 1968 – Patricia Girard, French runner and hurdler
- 1968 – Tracy Grammer, American singer-songwriter and guitarist
- 1971 – Darren Jessee, American singer-songwriter and drummer
- 1972 – Paul Gray, American bass player and songwriter (died 2010)
- 1972 – Sergei Magnitsky, Russian lawyer and accountant (died 2009)
- 1973 – Khaled Badra, Tunisian footballer
- 1973 – Emma Caulfield, American actress
- 1973 – Christof May, German theologian
- 1974 – Toutai Kefu, Tongan-Australian rugby player
- 1974 – Chris Kyle, American sniper and memoirist (died 2013)
- 1974 – Nnedi Okorafor, Nigerian-American author and educator
- 1974 – Nayden Todorov, Bulgarian conductor and culture minister
- 1975 – Anouk, Dutch singer
- 1975 – Francesco Flachi, Italian footballer
- 1975 – Timo Pérez, Dominican-American baseball player
- 1975 – Funda Arar, Turkish singer
- 1977 – Ana de la Reguera, Mexican actress
- 1977 – Mehran Ghassemi, Iranian journalist and author (died 2008)
- 1977 – Mark Spencer, American computer programmer and engineer
- 1978 – Daigo, Japanese singer-songwriter, actor, and voice actor
- 1978 – Bernt Haas, Austrian-Swiss footballer
- 1978 – Rachel Roberts, Canadian model and actress
- 1978 – Jocelyn Robichaud, Canadian tennis player and coach
- 1978 – Evans Rutto, Kenyan runner
- 1979 – Alexi Laiho, Finnish singer-songwriter and guitarist (died 2020)
- 1979 – Amit Trivedi, Indian singer-songwriter
- 1980 – Manuel Ortega, Austrian singer
- 1980 – Katee Sackhoff, American actress
- 1980 – Mariko Seyama, Japanese announcer, photographer, and model
- 1981 – Frédérick Bousquet, French swimmer
- 1981 – Taylor Kitsch, Canadian actor and model
- 1981 – Ofer Shechter, Israeli model, actor, and screenwriter
- 1982 – Gennady Golovkin, Kazakhstani boxer
- 1982 – Brett White, Australian rugby league player
- 1982 – Allu Arjun, Indian actor
- 1983 – Tatyana Petrova Arkhipova, Russian runner
- 1984 – Michelle Donelan, British politician
- 1984 – Ezra Koenig, American singer-songwriter and guitarist
- 1984 – Pablo Portillo, Mexican singer and actor
- 1984 – Taran Noah Smith, American actor
- 1985 – Patrick Schliwa, German rugby player
- 1985 – Yemane Tsegay, Ethiopian runner
- 1986 – Igor Akinfeev, Russian footballer
- 1986 – Félix Hernández, Venezuelan baseball player
- 1986 – Carlos Santana, Dominican baseball player
- 1987 – Royston Drenthe, Dutch footballer
- 1987 – Jeremy Hellickson, American baseball player
- 1987 – Elton John, Trinidadian footballer
- 1987 – Sam Rapira, New Zealand rugby league player
- 1988 – Jenni Asserholt, Swedish ice hockey player
- 1989 – Matty Healy, English singer-songwriter and producer
- 1990 – Kim Jong-hyun, South Korean singer (died 2017)
- 1992 – Jeff McNeil, American baseball player
- 1993 – Viktor Arvidsson, Swedish ice hockey player
- 1993 – TBJZL, English YouTuber
- 1994 – Josh Chudleigh, Australian rugby league player
- 1995 – Forrest Frank, American singer-songwriter
- 1995 – Cedi Osman, Turkish professional basketball player
- 1996 – Anna Korakaki, Greek Olympic shooter
- 1997 – Kim Woo-jin, South Korean singer
- 1997 – Saygrace, Australian singer and songwriter
- 1997 – Roquan Smith, American football player
- 1997 – Arno Verschueren, Belgian footballer
- 1997 – Keira Walsh, English footballer
- 1998 – Lavinia Valbonesi, Ecuadorian nutritionist, businesswoman and First Lady of Ecuador
- 1999 – CeeDee Lamb, American football player
- 2002 – Jamie Drysdale, Canadian ice hockey player
- 2002 – Viktória Forster, Slovak track and field athlete
- 2002 – Skai Jackson, American actress
- 2005 – Zaccharie Risacher, French basketball player
- 2013 – Big Justice, American social media personality

== Deaths ==
=== Pre-1600 ===
- 217 – Caracalla, Roman emperor (born 188)
- 622 – Shōtoku, Japanese prince (born 572)
- 632 – Charibert II, Frankish king (born 607)
- 894 – Adalelm, Frankish nobleman
- 944 – Wang Yanxi, Chinese emperor
- 956 – Gilbert, Frankish nobleman
- 967 – Mu'izz al-Dawla, Buyid emir (born 915)
- 1143 – John II Komnenos, Byzantine emperor (born 1087)
- 1150 – Gertrude of Babenberg, duchess of Bohemia (born 1118)
- 1321 – Thomas of Tolentino, Italian-Franciscan missionary (born c. 1255)
- 1338 – Stephen Gravesend, bishop of London
- 1364 – John II, French king (born 1319)
- 1450 – Sejong the Great, Korean king (born 1397)
- 1461 – Georg von Peuerbach, German mathematician and astronomer (born 1423)
- 1492 – Lorenzo de' Medici, Italian ruler (born 1449)
- 1551 – Oda Nobuhide, Japanese warlord (born 1510)
- 1586 – Martin Chemnitz, Lutheran theologian and reformer (born 1522)

=== 1601–1900 ===
- 1608 – Magdalen Dacre, English noble (born 1538)
- 1612 – Anne Catherine of Brandenburg (born 1575)
- 1691 – Carlo Rainaldi, Italian architect, designed the Santa Maria dei Miracoli and Santa Maria in Montesanto (born 1611)
- 1697 – Niels Juel, Norwegian-Danish admiral (born 1629)
- 1704 – Hiob Ludolf, German orientalist and philologist (born 1624)
- 1704 – Henry Sydney, 1st Earl of Romney, English colonel and politician, Lord Lieutenant of Ireland (born 1641)
- 1709 – Wolfgang Dietrich of Castell-Remlingen, German nobleman (born 1641)
- 1725 – John Wise, American minister (born 1652)
- 1735 – Francis II Rákóczi, Hungarian prince (born 1676)
- 1848 – Gaetano Donizetti, Italian composer (born 1797)
- 1860 – István Széchenyi, Hungarian statesman and reformer (born 1791)
- 1861 – Elisha Otis, American businessman, founded the Otis Elevator Company (born 1811)
- 1870 – Charles Auguste de Bériot, Belgian violinist and composer (born 1802)
- 1877 – Bernardino António Gomes, Portuguese physician and naturalist (born 1806)
- 1894 – Bankim Chandra Chattopadhyay, Indian journalist, author, and poet (born 1838)

=== 1901–present ===
- 1906 – Auguste Deter, German woman, first person diagnosed with Alzheimer's disease (born 1850)
- 1919 – Loránd Eötvös, Hungarian physicist, academic, and politician, Hungarian Minister of Education (born 1848)
- 1920 – Charles Griffes, American pianist and composer (born 1884)
- 1931 – Erik Axel Karlfeldt, Swedish poet Nobel Prize laureate (born 1864)
- 1936 – Róbert Bárány, Austrian physician and academic, Nobel Prize laureate (born 1876)
- 1936 – Božena Benešová, Czech poet and novelist (born 1873)
- 1941 – Marcel Prévost, French novelist and playwright (born 1862)
- 1942 – Kostas Skarvelis, Greek guitarist and composer (born 1880)
- 1947 – Olaf Frydenlund, Norwegian target shooter (born 1862)
- 1950 – Vaslav Nijinsky, Polish dancer and choreographer (born 1890)
- 1959 – Marios Makrionitis, Roman Catholic Archbishop of Athens (born 1913)
- 1961 – Joseph Carrodus, Australian public servant (born 1885)
- 1962 – Juan Belmonte, Spanish bullfighter (born 1892)
- 1965 – Lars Hanson, Swedish actor (born 1886)
- 1969 – Zinaida Aksentyeva, Ukrainian astronomer (born 1900)
- 1973 – Pablo Picasso, Spanish painter and sculptor (born 1881)
- 1974 – James Charles McGuigan, Canadian cardinal (born 1894)
- 1979 – Breece D'J Pancake, American short story writer (born 1952)
- 1981 – Omar Bradley, American general (born 1893)
- 1983 – Isamu Kosugi, Japanese actor and director (born 1904)
- 1984 – Pyotr Kapitsa, Russian physicist and academic, Nobel Prize laureate (born 1894)
- 1985 – John Frederick Coots, American pianist and composer (born 1897)
- 1990 – Ryan White, American activist, inspired the Ryan White Care Act (born 1971)
- 1991 – Per Ohlin, Swedish musician (born 1969)
- 1992 – Daniel Bovet, Swiss-Italian pharmacologist and academic, Nobel Prize laureate (born 1907)
- 1993 – Marian Anderson, American operatic singer (born 1897)
- 1994 – François Rozet, French-Canadian actor (born 1899)
- 1996 – Ben Johnson, American actor and stuntman (born 1918)
- 1996 – León Klimovsky, Argentinian-Spanish actor, director, and screenwriter (born 1906)
- 1996 – Mick Young, Australian politician (born 1936)
- 1997 – Laura Nyro, American singer-songwriter and pianist (born 1947)
- 2000 – František Šťastný, Czech motorcycle racer (born 1927)
- 2000 – Claire Trevor, American actress (born 1910)
- 2002 – María Félix, Mexican actress (born 1914)
- 2002 – Harvey Quaytman, American painter (born 1937)
- 2004 – Werner Schumacher, German actor (born 1921)
- 2005 – Onna White, Canadian choreographer and dancer (born 1922)
- 2006 – Gerard Reve, Dutch author and poet (born 1923)
- 2007 – Sol LeWitt, American painter and sculptor (born 1928)
- 2008 – Kazuo Shiraga, Japanese painter (born 1924)
- 2009 – Richard de Mille, American Scientologist, author, investigative journalist, and psychologist (born 1922)
- 2009 – Piotr Morawski, Polish mountaineer (born 1976)
- 2010 – Antony Flew, English philosopher and academic (born 1923)
- 2010 – Malcolm McLaren, English singer-songwriter (born 1946)
- 2010 – Teddy Scholten, Dutch singer (born 1926)
- 2011 – Hedda Sterne, Romanian-American painter and photographer (born 1910)
- 2012 – Blair Kiel, American football player and coach (born 1961)
- 2012 – Jack Tramiel, Polish-American businessman, founded Commodore International (born 1928)
- 2012 – Janusz K. Zawodny, Polish-American soldier, historian, and political scientist (born 1921)
- 2013 – Mikhail Beketov, Russian journalist (born 1958)
- 2013 – Annette Funicello, American actress and singer (born 1942)
- 2013 – Sara Montiel, Spanish-Mexican actress and singer (born 1928)
- 2013 – José Luis Sampedro, Spanish economist and author (born 1917)
- 2013 – Margaret Thatcher, English politician, first female Prime Minister of the United Kingdom (born 1925)
- 2014 – Emmanuel III Delly, Iraqi patriarch (born 1927)
- 2014 – Karlheinz Deschner, German author and activist (born 1924)
- 2014 – Ivan Mercep, New Zealand architect, designed the Te Papa Tongarewa Museum (born 1930)
- 2015 – Jayakanthan, Indian journalist and author (born 1934)
- 2015 – Rayson Huang, Hong Kong chemist and academic (born 1920)
- 2015 – Sergei Lashchenko, Ukrainian kick-boxer (born 1987)
- 2015 – David Laventhol, American journalist and publisher (born 1933)
- 2015 – Jean-Claude Turcotte, Canadian cardinal (born 1936)
- 2019 – Josine Ianco-Starrels, Romanian-born American art curator (born 1926)
- 2020 – Rick May, American-Canadian voice actor (born 1940)
- 2020 – Abdul Momin Imambari, Bangladeshi Islamic scholar (born 1930)
- 2022 – Mimi Reinhardt, Jewish Austrian secretary (born 1915)
- 2024 – Keith Barnes, Welsh-Australian rugby league player and coach (born 1934)
- 2024 – Peter Higgs, British physicist, Nobel Prize laureate (born 1929)
- 2024 – Ralph Puckett, American Army officer, Medal of Honor recipient (born 1926)
- 2025 – Nelsy Cruz, Dominican politician, governor of Monte Cristi (born 1982)

== Holidays and observances ==
- Buddha's Birthday, also known as Hana Matsuri, "Flower Festival" (Japan)
- Christian feast day:
  - Anne Ayres (Episcopal Church (USA))
  - Blessed August Czartoryski
  - Constantina
  - Pope Dionysius of Alexandria
  - Julie Billiart of Namur
  - Perpetuus
  - Walter of Pontoise
  - William Augustus Muhlenberg (Episcopal Church (USA))
  - April 8 (Eastern Orthodox liturgics)
- Earliest day on which Fast and Prayer Day can fall, while April 14 is the latest; celebrated on the second Friday in April (Liberia)
- International Romani Day
