= March 25 (Eastern Orthodox liturgics) =

Day in the Eastern Orthodox liturgical calendar

Eastern Orthodox liturgical calendar
March 24	March 25	March 26
March 25 O.S. ≍ April 7 N.S. March 25 N.S ≍ March 12 O.S.

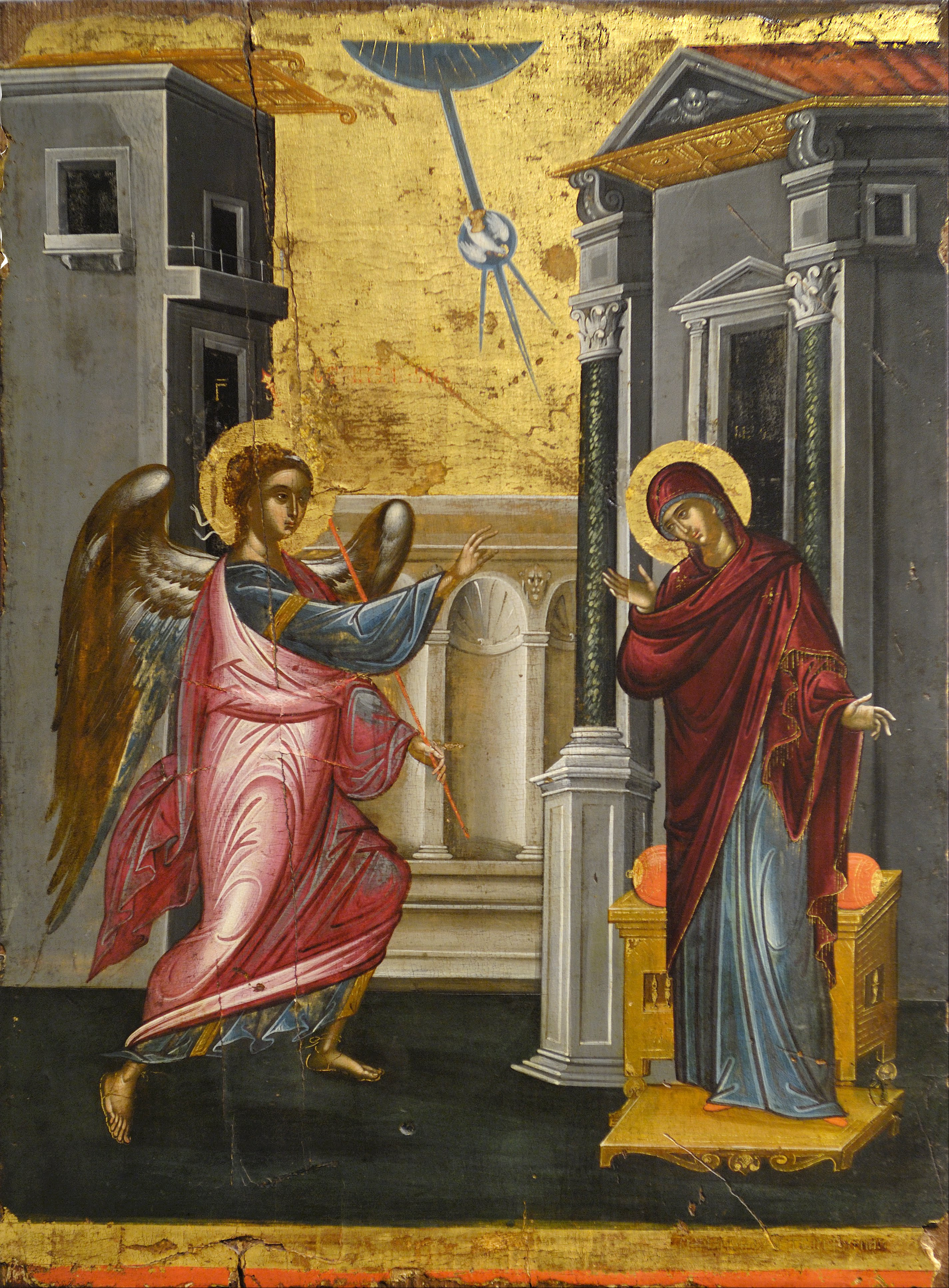
The Annunciation of Our Most Holy Lady, the Theotokos and Ever-Virgin Mary. (Benaki Museum, c. 1570-1625).

March 25 in Eastern Orthodox liturgical calendars is a feast day and a day of commemoration of saints and martyrs. Although some Orthodox churches use the Revised Julian Calendar and others use the traditional Julian calendar, the fixed commemorations for their respective March 25 are broadly the same, no matter which calendar is used. (Note: Despite the dates being the same, the days to which they refer typically differ by 13 days. The notation Old Style or O.S. is sometimes used to indicate a date in the traditional Julian Calendar (the "Old Calendar"). The notation New Style or N.S. indicates a date in the Revised Julian calendar (the "New Calendar").)

== Feasts ==
- The Annunciation of Our Most Holy Lady, the Theotokos and Ever-Virgin Mary. (Note: Name days today include: Evangelos (Angelo), Evangelia (Angela).)

== Saints ==
- Saint Dismas the Good Thief, crucified next to Christ (1st century) (Note: "At Jerusalem, the commemoration of the good Thief, who confessed Christ on the cross, and deserved to hear from Him these words: "This day thou shalt be with Me in paradise."") (see also: October 12; Good Friday)
- Martyrs Pelagia, Theodosia, and Dula, at Caesarea Palestinae, by the sword (361)
- The Holy Martyr who was formerly an executioner.
- Venerable Sennouphios the Standard-bearer, of Latomos Monastery in Thessalonica (9th century) (Note: Venerable Sennouphios was an ascetic of Nitria, who saw a vision of an icon of our Lord Jesus Christ, Who instructed him to go to Latomos Monastery in Thessalonica, where he would see this same icon.)
- Venerable Timon the Hermit (10th century).

== Pre-Schism Western saints ==
- Holy 262 Martyrs of Rome.
- Saint Quirinus of Tegernsee (Quirinus of Rome), a martyr who suffered in Rome under Claudius II (c. 269) (Note: "At Rome, St. Quirinus, martyr, who after losing his goods, suffering imprisonment in a dark dungeon, and being severely scourged, was put to death with the sword, and thrown into the Tiber. The Christians found his body in the island of St. Bartholomew and buried it in the Pontian cemetery.")
- Saint Irenaeus of Sirmium, Bishop in Pannonia (Hungary), martyred under Diocletian at Sirmium (Mitrovica) (304) (see also: March 26)
- Saint Caimin of Inis Cealtra, Bishop-Abbot of Inis Cealtra and possibly the first Bishop of Killaloe (653) (Note: An ascetic who lived as a hermit on an island in Lough Derg in Ireland. Many disciples were attracted to him on account of his holiness. Later he founded a monastery and church on the island of the Seven Churches and worked with St Senan. A fragment of the Psalter of St Caimin, copied in his own hand, still exists.) (see also: March 24)
- Saint Humbert of Maroilles, a disciple of St Amandus who helped found the monastery of Marolles in Belgium (c. 680)
- Saint Hermenland (Hermeland, Herbland, Erblon), monk at Fontenelle, ordained priest and sent with twelve monks to establish a new monastery on the island of Aindre (Indret) in the estuary of the Loire (c. 720) (Note: "In Indre, an island of the Loire, the abbot St. Hermelandus, whose glorious life is attested by signal miracles.")
- Saints Barontius and Desiderius (c. 725) (Note: Barontius became a monk at Lonrey near Bourges in France. As a result of a vision he became a hermit, set out for Italy, and settled near Pistoia. There he lived very ascetically with another monk, called Desiderius, who is also honoured as a saint.)
- Saint Kennocha (Kyle, Enoch), nun at a convent in Fife, held in great veneration in Scotland, especially around Glasgow (1007) (Note: See also: Rev. Alban Butler (1711–73). St. Kennocha, Virgin in Scotland. The Lives of the Saints. Volume III: March. 1866. (Bartleby.com).)
- Saint Ælfwold, a monk at Winchester who was chosen as Bishop of Sherborne in 1045 (1058)

== Post-Schism Orthodox saints ==
- Saint Nicander, hermit, of Pskov (1582) (see also: September 24)
- Venerable Parthenius of the Kiev Caves (1855)
- Venerable Savvas the New of Kalymnos (1947) (see also: March 24; April 7 - Greek; the fifth Sunday of Great Lent)
- Saint Justin (Popovic), Archimandrite of Ćelije Monastery in Serbia and Confessor of Traditional Orthodoxy (1979) (Note: His service is celebrated on June 1.) (Old style 25 March, 7 April on new calendar, due to OS Annunciation moved to: June 1)

=== New martyrs and confessors ===
- New Hieroconfessor Tikhon, Patriarch of Moscow and all Russia (1925) (Note: His service is celebrated on September 26.)

== Other commemorations ==
- Greek Independence Day: Proclamation of Greek independence on March 25, 1821, blessed by Metropolitan Germanos III of Old Patras at the Monastery of Agia Lavra. (Note: The Greek revolt was precipitated on March 25, 1821, when Bishop Germanos of Patras raised the flag of revolution over the Monastery of Agia Lavra in the Peloponnese. The cry "Freedom or Death" became the motto of the revolution. Some European newspapers of June and July 1821 published news of a declaration of revolution by Germanos either in Patras on 6 April/ 25 March 1821 or in the "Monastery of Velia Mountain" (Agia Lavra) on a non specified date.)

=== Icons ===
- Synaxis of the Most Holy Theotokos the Burning Bush, on Mount Sinai (Our Lady of the Burning Bush).
- Synaxis of the Most Holy Theotokos Evangelístria, kept at the monastery of Aliartos in Boeotia.
- Synaxis of the Most Holy Theotokos of Kypera, kept at the monastery of the Panagia, on the island of Cephalonia.
- "Annunciation" Icon of the Mother of God (16th century)

== Icon gallery ==
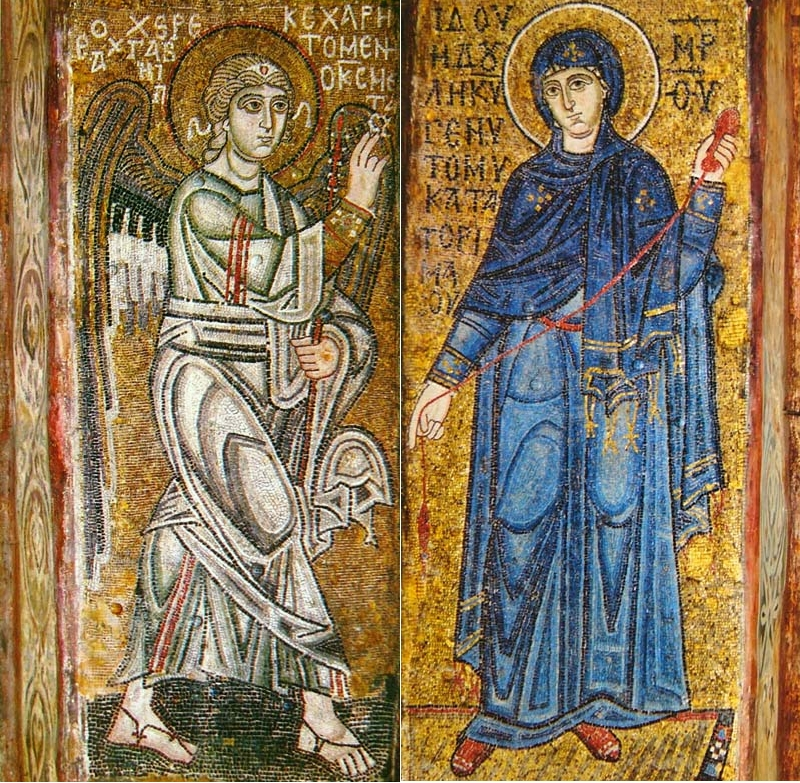
Icon of the Annunciation (Note: These mosaics are identified as the earliest depiction of the Annunciation in the art of the Slavs. The Mother of God spins the purple of the Temple, a detail which came to the visual arts from the apocrypha, in particular from the Protoevangelium of James.).
(Saint Sophia Cathedral,
c. 1037).

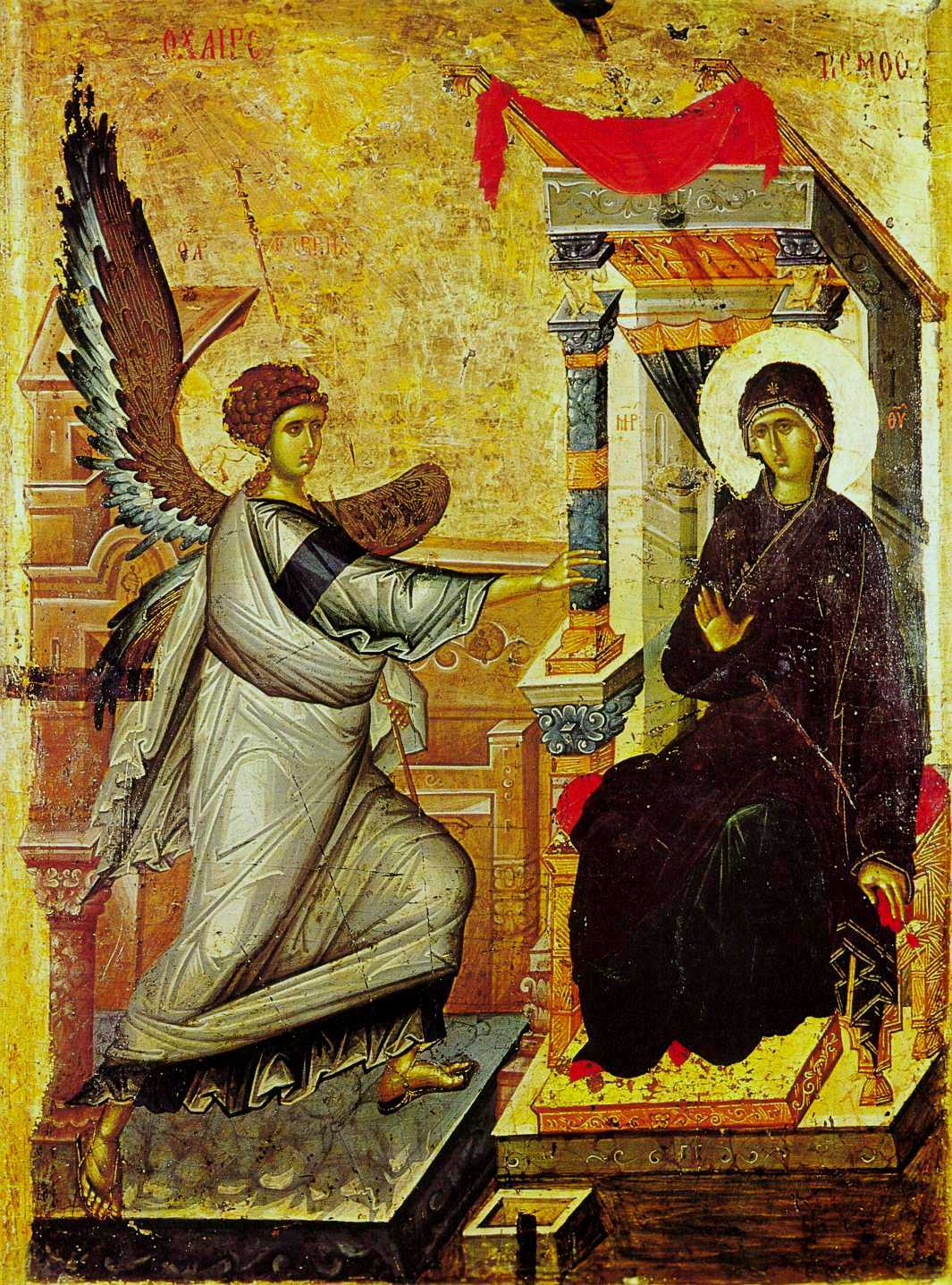
Icon of Annunciation.
(Church of St Clement in Ohrid, 14th century).

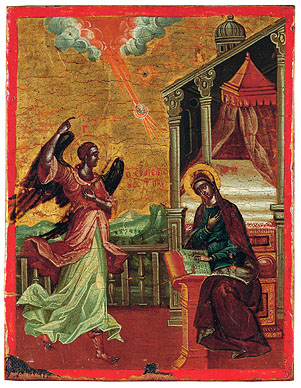
Icon of Annunciation.
(Greece, 18th century).

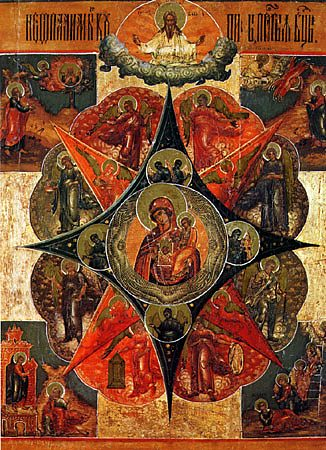
Icon of the Most Holy Theotokos the Burning Bush.

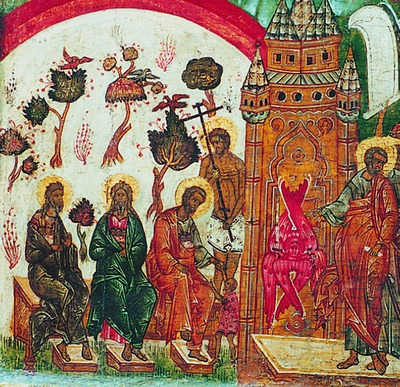
St. Dismas the Good Thief in the Bosom of Abraham.

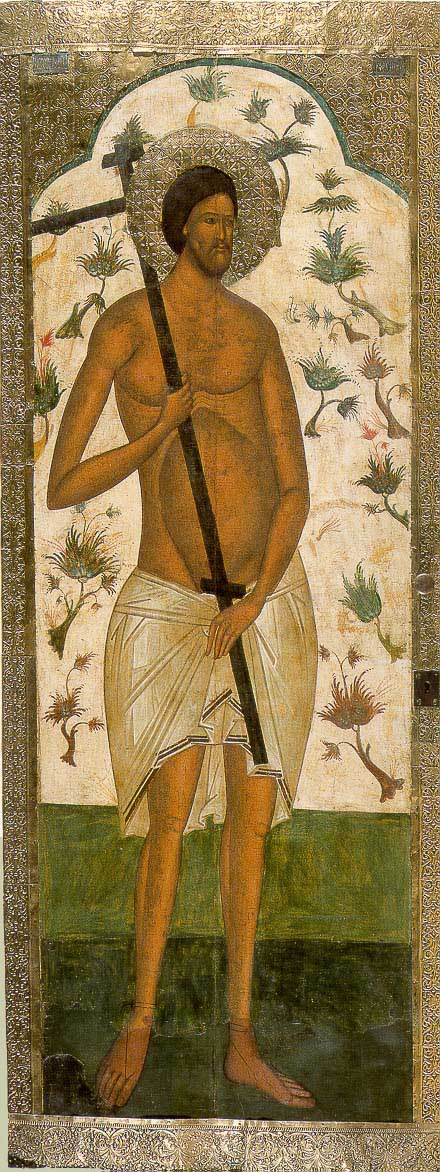
St. Dismas the Good Thief (c. 1560).

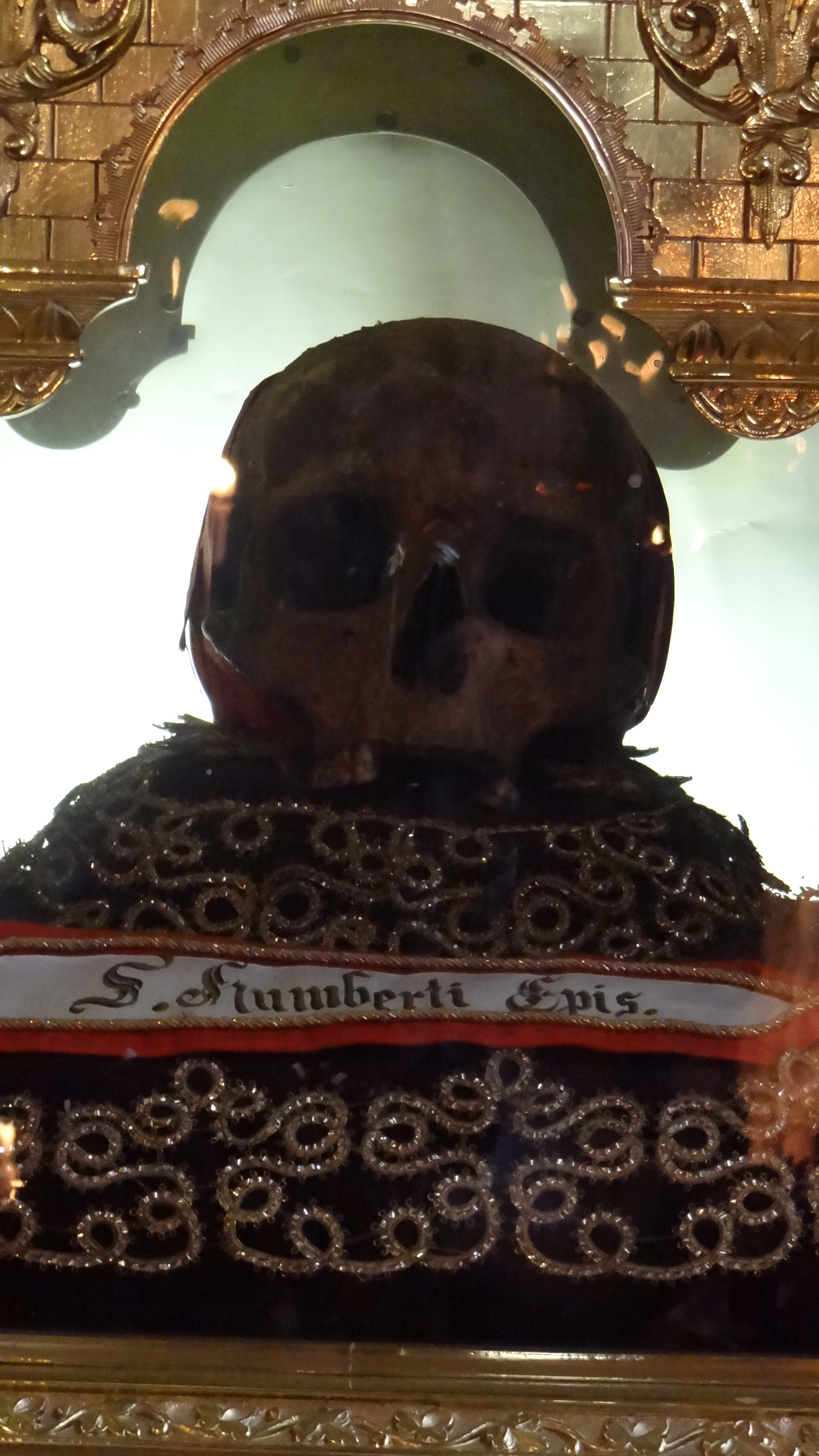
Skull (relic) of St. Humbert of Maroilles.

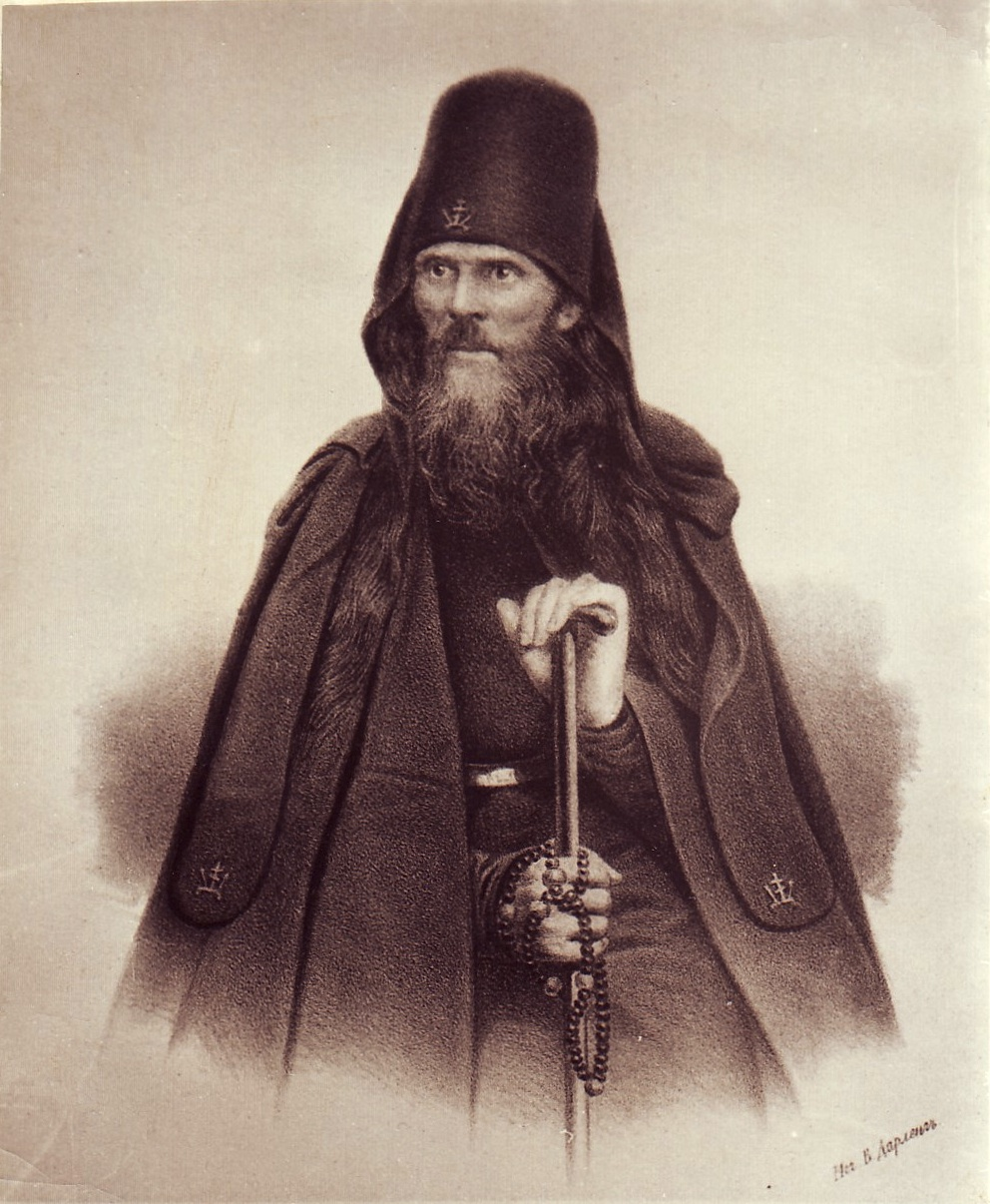
Venerable Parthenius of the Kiev Caves.

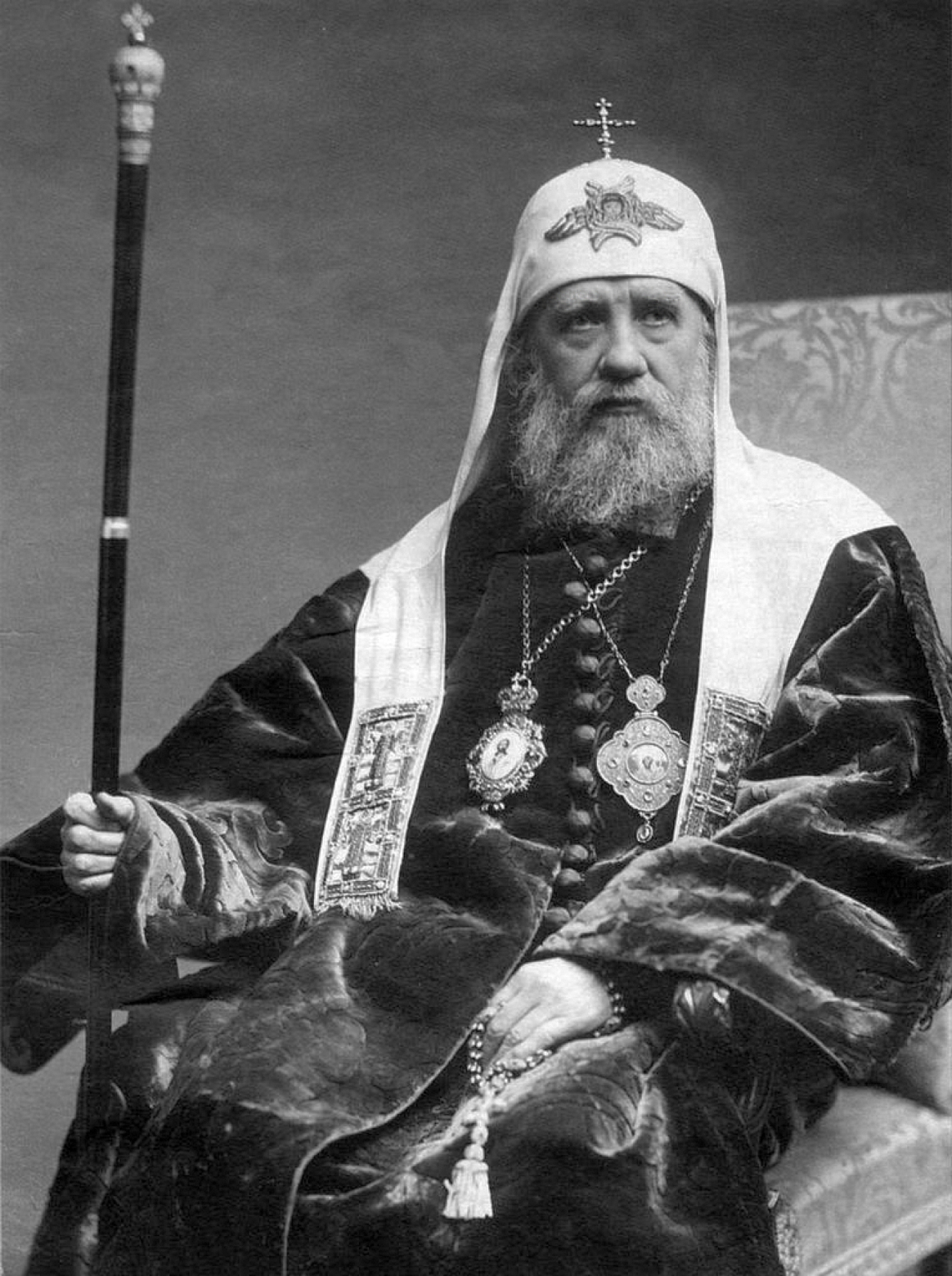
New Hieroconfessor Tikhon, Patriarch of Moscow and all Russia.

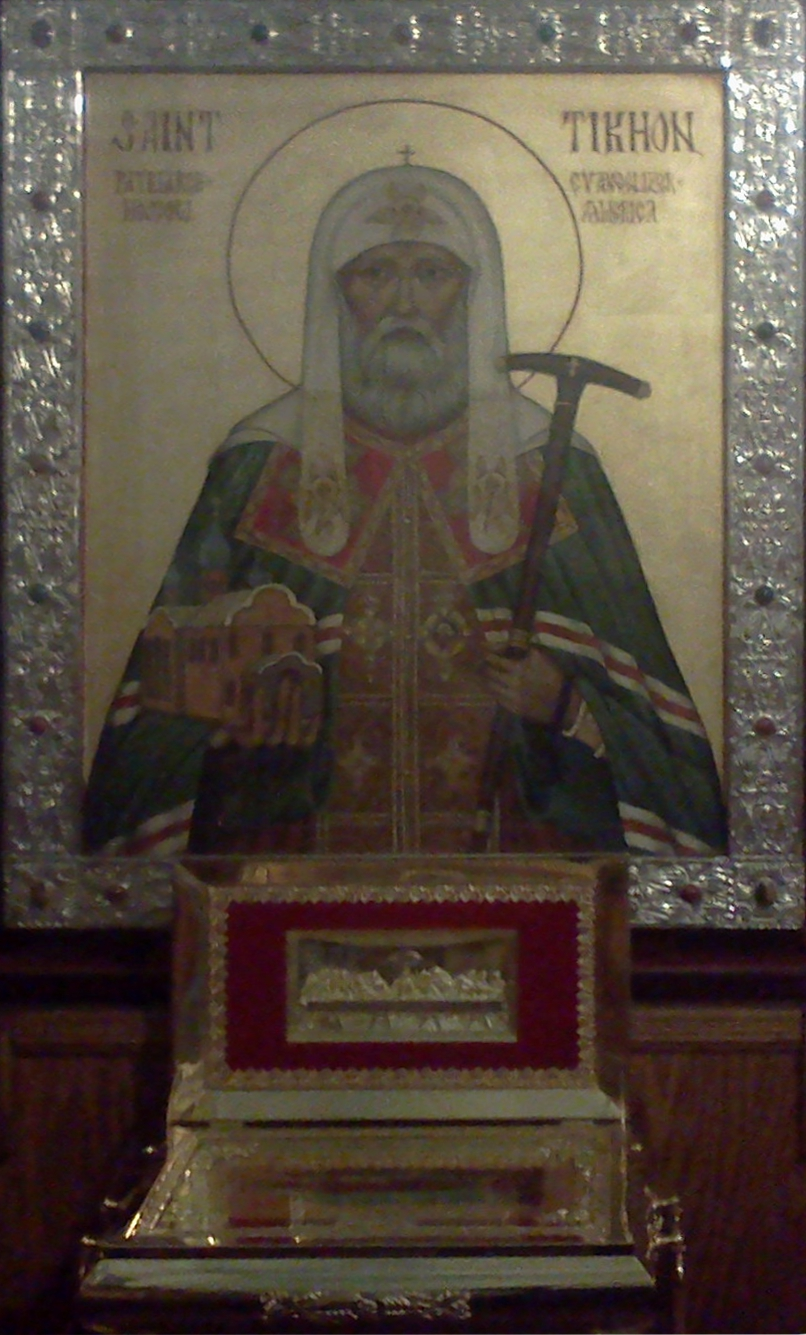
New Hieroconfessor Tikhon, Patriarch of Moscow and all Russia.

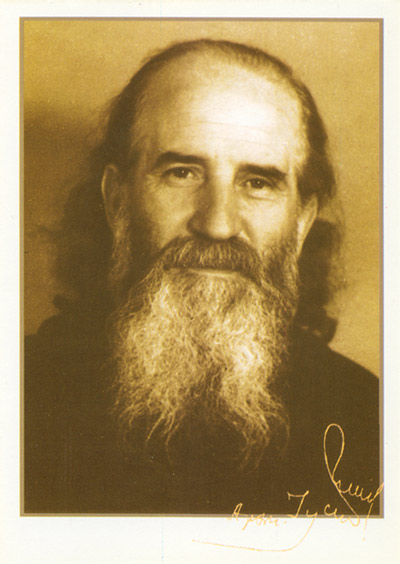
Saint Justin (Popovic).

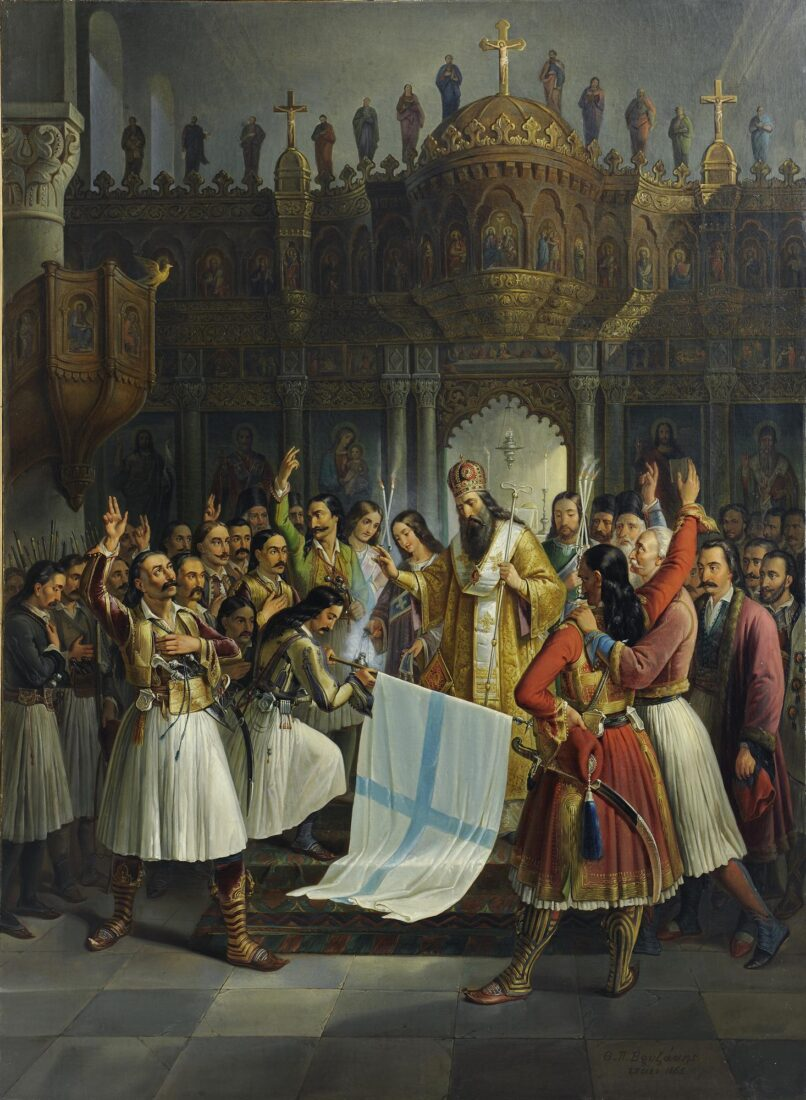
Proclamation of Greek Independence on March 25, 1821.

== Sources ==
- March 25/April 7. Orthodox Calendar (PRAVOSLAVIE.RU).
- April 7 / March 25. HOLY TRINITY RUSSIAN ORTHODOX CHURCH (A parish of the Patriarchate of Moscow).
- March 25. OCA - The Lives of the Saints.
- The Autonomous Orthodox Metropolia of Western Europe and the Americas (ROCOR). St. Hilarion Calendar of Saints for the year of our Lord 2004. St. Hilarion Press (Austin, TX). p. 24.
- March 25. Latin Saints of the Orthodox Patriarchate of Rome.
- The Roman Martyrology. Transl. by the Archbishop of Baltimore. Last Edition, According to the Copy Printed at Rome in 1914. Revised Edition, with the Imprimatur of His Eminence Cardinal Gibbons. Baltimore: John Murphy Company, 1916. pp. 86–87.
- Rev. Richard Stanton. A Menology of England and Wales, or, Brief Memorials of the Ancient British and English Saints Arranged According to the Calendar, Together with the Martyrs of the 16th and 17th Centuries. London: Burns & Oates, 1892. pp. 132–134.

Greek Sources

- Great Synaxaristes: (in Greek) 25 ΜΑΡΤΙΟΥ. ΜΕΓΑΣ ΣΥΝΑΞΑΡΙΣΤΗΣ.
- (in Greek) Συναξαριστής. 25 Μαρτίου. ECCLESIA.GR. (H ΕΚΚΛΗΣΙΑ ΤΗΣ ΕΛΛΑΔΟΣ).

Russian Sources

- (in Russian) 7 апреля (25 марта). Православная Энциклопедия под редакцией Патриарха Московского и всея Руси Кирилла (электронная версия). (Orthodox Encyclopedia - Pravenc.ru).
- (in Russian) 25 марта (ст.ст.) 7 апреля 2013 (нов. ст.). Русская Православная Церковь Отдел внешних церковных связей. (DECR).
