= April 6 (Eastern Orthodox liturgics) =

Day in the Eastern Orthodox liturgical calendar

Eastern Orthodox liturgical calendar
April 5	April 6	April 7
April 6 O.S. ≍ April 19 N.S. April 6 N.S ≍ March 24 O.S.

An Eastern Orthodox cross

April 6 in Eastern Orthodox liturgical calendars is a feast day and a day of commemoration of saints and martyrs. Although some Orthodox churches use the Revised Julian Calendar and others use the traditional Julian calendar, the fixed commemorations for their respective April 6 are broadly the same, no matter which calendar is used. (Note: Despite the dates being the same, the days to which they refer typically differ by 13 days. The notation Old Style or O.S. is sometimes used to indicate a date in the traditional Julian Calendar (the "Old Calendar"). The notation New Style or N.S. indicates a date in the Revised Julian calendar (the "New Calendar").)

== Saints ==
- Hieromartyr Archilias, Priest, and Martyr Jeremiah, of Rome (3rd century)
- Venerable Platonis (Platonida) of Nisibis, reposed in peace (c. 300-308)
- Martyr Platonis (Platonides) and two martyrs buried up to their loins, at Ascalon in Palestine.
- Hieromartyr Irenaeus, Bishop of Sirmium in Hungary (304) (See also: March 26 - Church of Romania)
- 120 Martyrs of Persia under Shapur II (c. 344-347)
- Martyrs Timothy and Diogenes, in Macedonia, by Arians (345)
- Saint Eutychius, Patriarch of Constantinople (582)
- Equal-to-the-Apostles Methodius of Moravia, Archbishop of Moravia and Enlightener of the Slavs (885) (see also: May 11)

== Pre-Schism Western saints ==
- Saints Florentius, Geminianus and Saturus, martyrs in Sirmium in Pannonia (4th century)
- Saints Rufina, Moderata, Romana, Secundus and Seven Companions, martyred at Sirmium in Pannonia (4th century)
- Saint Marcellinus of Carthage, imperial representative in North Africa, martyred by the Donatists (413)
- Saint Celestine, Pope of Rome (432) (Note: Born in the Campagna in Italy, he succeeded Boniface I as Pope of Rome in 422. He supported St Germanus of Auxerre against Pelagianism and condemned Nestorianism.)
- Saint Brychan, a King in Wales with twenty-four saintly children (5th century)
- Saint Ulched (Ulchad, Ylched), a holy man who gave his name to Llechulched in Anglesey in Wales.
- Saint Winebald (Winewald, Vinebaud), a monk at Saint-Loup-de-Troyes in France where he became abbot (c. 650)
- Saint Derfel (Tervillius) the Prince, son of King Joel II, became a hermit in Llandderfel in Gwynedd in Wales (660) (see also: April 5)
- Saint Gennard, a monk at Fontenelle Abbey in France and eventually Abbot of Flay (Saint-Germer-de-Fly Abbey) (720)
- Saint Berthanc (Berchan), a monk at Iona in Scotland and later Bishop of Kirkwall in Orkney (c. 840) (Note: See also: The Prophecy of Berchán.)
- Saint Prudentius of Troyes (Prudentius Galindo) (861) (Note: Born in Spain, in his youth he fled from the Saracens to France, where he changed his baptismal name Galindo to Prudentius. He became Bishop of Troyes.)
- Saint Notker the Stammerer, nicknamed Balbulus (the Stammerer), monk at St Gall Abbey where he spent his whole life, excelling as a musician (912)
- Saint Urban, Abbot of the Monastery of Peñalba near Astorga in Spain (c. 940)
- Saint Ælfstan (Elstan), monk who became Bishop of Ramsbury and succeeded St Ethelwold as Abbot of Abingdon (981)

== Post-Schism Orthodox saints ==
- Venerable Gregory (Drimys) of the Great Lavra on Mount Athos (Gregory the Byzantine) (1310), instructor of St. Gregory Palamas.
- Venerable Gregory of Sinai (Mt. Athos) (Gregory the Sinaite) (1347)
- Venerable Rufus the Obedient, of the Kiev Far Caves (14th century) (see also: April 8)
- New Martyr Nicholas the Deacon, of Mytilene (1463) (Note: The finding of his relics is celebrated on May 31.)
- Saint Aphonios, Bishop of Novgorod from 1635-1649 (1652) (Note: See: (in Russian) Аффоний (митрополит Новгородский). Википедии. (Russian Wikipedia).)
- New Martyr Paul the Russian, at Constantinople (1683) (see also: April 3)
- New Hieromartyr Gennadius of Dionysiou, Mt. Athos, at Constantinople (1818)
- New Martyrs Manuel, Theodore, George, Michael, and another George, of Samothrace, at Makri in Thrace (1835)
- Saint Martyrius, monk of Glinsk Hermitage (1865)

=== New martyrs and confessors ===
- Martyrs Peter Zhukov and Prohor Mikhailov (1918)
- New Hieromartyr John Boikov, Priest (1934)
- New Hieromartyr Jacob Boikov, Priest (1943)
- New Hiero-confessor Sebastian (Fomin), Schema-Archimandrite of Optina Monastery and Karaganda (1966) (Note: See: (in Russian) Севастиан (Фомин). Википедии. (Russian Wikipedia).) (see also: April 19)

== Other commemorations ==
- Repose of Hieromonk Arsenius of Valaam Monastery (1853)
- Repose of Elder Mardarius of the Nizhni-Novgorod Caves Monastery (1859)
- Repose of Archimandrite Seraphim (Tyapochkin) of Rakitin (1982) (Note: See: (in Russian) Серафим (Тяпочкин). Википедии. (Russian Wikipedia).)

== Icon gallery ==
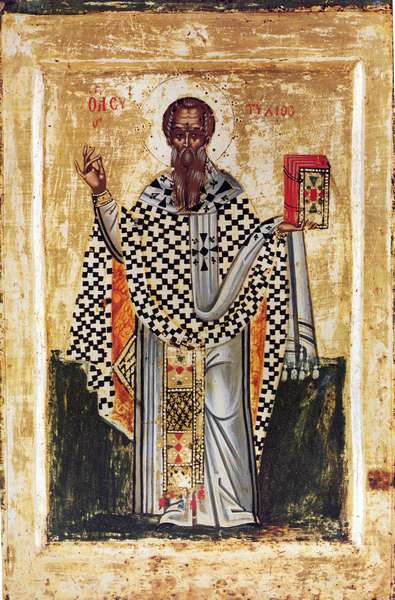
Patriarch Eutychius of Constantinople.

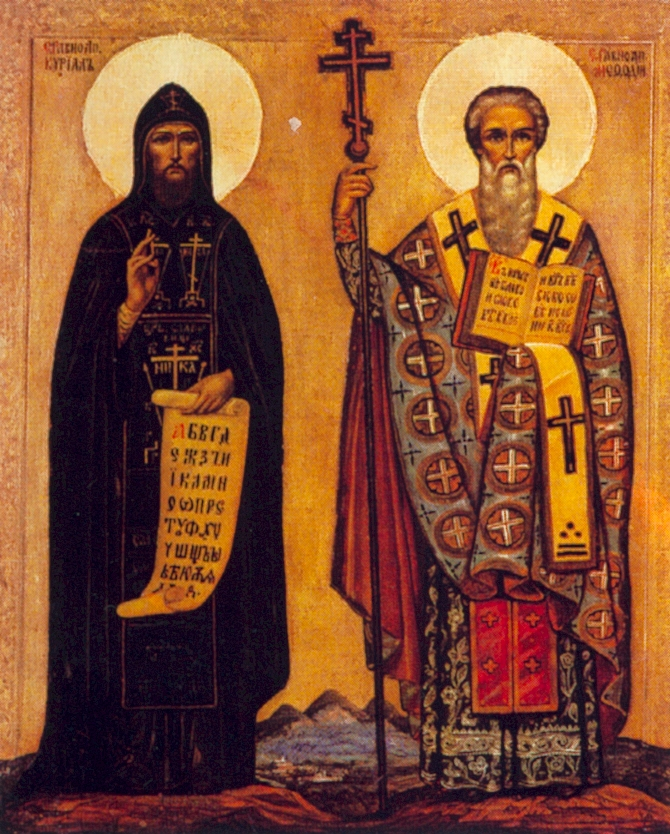
Sts. Cyril and Methodius (Icon from 18th or 19th century)

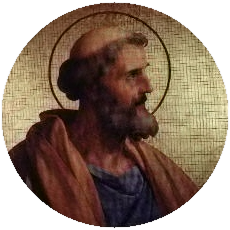
Saint Celestine, Pope of Rome.

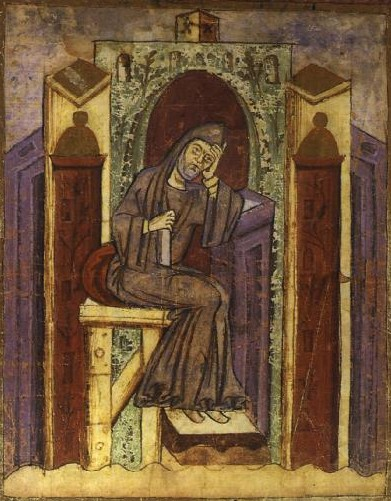
Blessed Notker of Saint Gall.

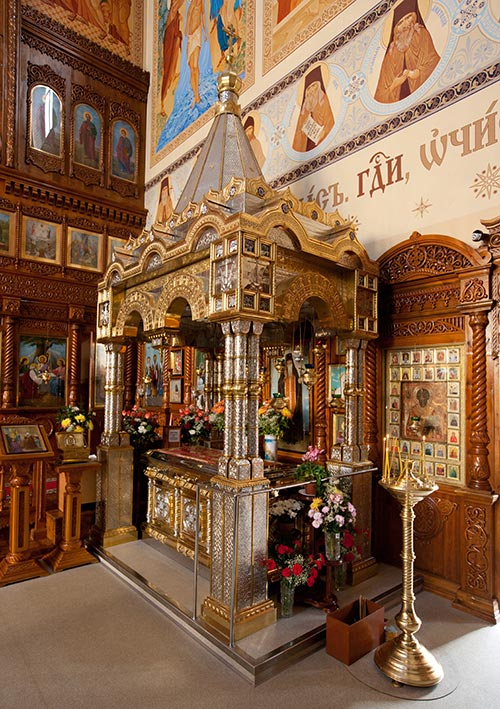
Shrine of New Hiero-confessor Sebastian (Fomin).

== Sources ==
- April 6 / April 19. Orthodox Calendar (PRAVOSLAVIE.RU).
- April 19 / April 6. HOLY TRINITY RUSSIAN ORTHODOX CHURCH (A parish of the Patriarchate of Moscow).
- April 6. OCA - The Lives of the Saints.
- The Autonomous Orthodox Metropolia of Western Europe and the Americas (ROCOR). St. Hilarion Calendar of Saints for the year of our Lord 2004. St. Hilarion Press (Austin, TX). p. 27.
- April 6. Latin Saints of the Orthodox Patriarchate of Rome.
- The Roman Martyrology. Transl. by the Archbishop of Baltimore. Last Edition, According to the Copy Printed at Rome in 1914. Revised Edition, with the Imprimatur of His Eminence Cardinal Gibbons. Baltimore: John Murphy Company, 1916. pp. 97–98.
- Rev. Richard Stanton. A Menology of England and Wales, or, Brief Memorials of the Ancient British and English Saints Arranged According to the Calendar, Together with the Martyrs of the 16th and 17th Centuries. London: Burns & Oates, 1892. pp. 145–146.

Greek Sources

- Great Synaxaristes: (in Greek) 6 ΑΠΡΙΛΙΟΥ. ΜΕΓΑΣ ΣΥΝΑΞΑΡΙΣΤΗΣ.
- (in Greek) Συναξαριστής. 6 Απριλίου. ECCLESIA.GR. (H ΕΚΚΛΗΣΙΑ ΤΗΣ ΕΛΛΑΔΟΣ).

Russian Sources

- (in Russian) 19 апреля (6 апреля). Православная Энциклопедия под редакцией Патриарха Московского и всея Руси Кирилла (электронная версия). (Orthodox Encyclopedia - Pravenc.ru).
- (in Russian) 6 апреля (ст.ст.) 19 апреля 2013 (нов. ст.). Русская Православная Церковь Отдел внешних церковных связей. (DECR).
