= March 24 (Eastern Orthodox liturgics) =

Day in the Eastern Orthodox liturgical calendar

Eastern Orthodox liturgical calendar
March 23	March 24	March 25
March 24 O.S. ≍ April 6 N.S. March 24 N.S ≍ March 11 O.S.

An Eastern Orthodox cross

March 24 in Eastern Orthodox liturgical calendars is a feast day and a day of commemoration of saints and martyrs. Although some Orthodox churches use the Revised Julian Calendar and others use the traditional Julian calendar, the fixed commemorations for their respective March 24 are broadly the same, no matter which calendar is used. (Note: Despite the dates being the same, the days to which they refer typically differ by 13 days. The notation Old Style or O.S. is sometimes used to indicate a date in the traditional Julian Calendar (the "Old Calendar"). The notation New Style or N.S. indicates a date in the Revised Julian calendar (the "New Calendar").)

== Feasts ==
- Forefeast of the Annunciation.

== Saints ==
- Saint Artemon, Bishop of Seleucia in Pisidia (1st century)
- Hieromartyr Artemon, presbyter of Laodicea (284-305) (see also: April 12, April 13)
- Martyr Timolaus and 7 Companions with him (8 Martyrs), in Caesarea Palaestina, by beheading (305) (Note: "At Caesarea, in Palestine, the birthday of the holy martyrs Timolaus, Denis, Pausides, Romulus, Alexander, another Alexander, Agapius, and another Denis, who merited the crown of life by being beheaded in the persecution of Diocletian, under the governor Urban.")
- Venerable Zachariah the Recluse, of Egypt (4th century)
- Venerable Martin of the Thebaid, monk.
- Venerable Abraham of Mount Latros, ascetic.
- Saint Thomas, Abbot of the monastery of St. Euthymius (542)
- Venerable Jacob of Catania (James the Confessor), Bishop of Catania (c. 730)
- Saint Severus of Catania, Bishop of Catania (c. 812)

== Pre-schism Western saints ==
- Saint Flavius Latinus of Brescia, third Bishop of Brescia in Italy (84-115) (Note: Flavius Latinus succeeded St Viator as the third Bishop of Brescia in Italy (84-115). He suffered imprisonment and torture with other Christians.)
- Martyrs Romulus and Secundus, brothers, in Mauritania (Barbary), who suffered for the faith of Christ.
- Saint Pigmenius, a priest in Rome thrown into the Tiber under Julian the Apostate (362) (Note: "Also, at Rome, in the time of Julian the Apostate, the passion of blessed Pigmenius, a priest, who was killed for the faith of Christ, by being precipitated into the Tiber.")
- Saint Domangard (Donard), patron of Maghera in Co. Down in Ireland, who lived as a hermit on the mountain now called Slieve-Donard after him (c. 500)
- Saint Macartan (Macartin, Maccarthen, Mac Cairthinn of Clogher), an early disciple and companion of St Patrick of Ireland, who consecrated him Bishop of Clogher (c. 505)
- Saint Cairlon (Caorlan, Carláen), an abbot in Ireland who became Archbishop of Armagh (588)
- Saint Caimin of Inis Cealtra (Holy Island) on Lough Derg, Bishop-Abbot of Inis Cealtra and possibly the first Bishop of Killaloe (653) (Note: An ascetic who lived as a hermit on an island in Lough Derg in Ireland. Many disciples were attracted to him on account of his holiness. Later he founded a monastery and church on the island of the Seven Churches and worked with St Senan. A fragment of the Psalter of St Caimin, copied in his own hand, still exists.) (see also: March 25)
- Saint Hildelith, Abbess of Barking Abbey (c. 712) (Note: "ST. HlLDELID succeeded St. Ethelburga in the government of her Abbey at Barking, and held the office many years, to extreme old age. She was wholly devoted to the service of God, most strict in enforcing regular observance, and prudent in the administration of the temporal goods of the house. In consequence of needful alterations in the monastic buildings, St. Hildelid caused the venerated remains of the servants of God, who were buried in the cemetery, to be removed and placed within the Church of our Blessed Lady; and this translation was honoured by several striking miracles, such as the supernatural light which was seen, and the celestial odour which was often perceived. St. Hildelid was held in veneration by St. Aidhelm, who dedicated to her his book on Virginity, and by St. Boniface, who mentions her with great respect in his letters.") (Note: A princess from England who became a nun either at Chelles or at Faremoutiers-en-Brie in France. She was recalled to England by St Erconwald of London to Barking, where she later became abbess, admired for her wisdom and culture.)

== Post-schism Orthodox saints ==
- Venerable Zachariah, Faster of the Kiev Caves (12th century)
- Martyrs Stephen and Peter of Kazan (1552)
- New Hieromartyr Parthenius III, Patriarch of Constantinople (1657)
- Venerable Savvas the New of Kalymnos (1947) (see also: March 25 or April 7; fifth Sunday of Great Lent)

=== New martyrs and confessors ===
- New Hieromartyr Vladimir Pankin, Priest, of Chimkent (1920)

== Other commemorations ==
- Synaxis of the Icon of the Theotokos "The Clouded Mountain" (also "the Uncut Mount" or "Smoky Mountain"), in Tver.
- Commemoration of the miracle at the Kiev Caves Lavra.

== Icon gallery ==
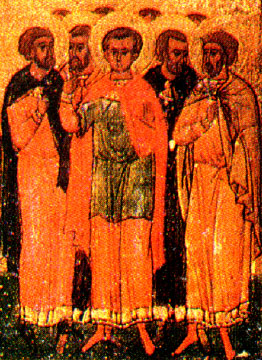
Martyr Timolaus and 7 Companions with him.

== Sources ==
- March 24/April 6. Orthodox Calendar (PRAVOSLAVIE.RU).
- April 6 / March 24. HOLY TRINITY RUSSIAN ORTHODOX CHURCH (A parish of the Patriarchate of Moscow).
- March 24. OCA - The Lives of the Saints.
- The Autonomous Orthodox Metropolia of Western Europe and the Americas (ROCOR). St. Hilarion Calendar of Saints for the year of our Lord 2004. St. Hilarion Press (Austin, TX). p. 24.
- March 24. Latin Saints of the Orthodox Patriarchate of Rome.
- The Roman Martyrology. Transl. by the Archbishop of Baltimore. Last Edition, According to the Copy Printed at Rome in 1914. Revised Edition, with the Imprimatur of His Eminence Cardinal Gibbons. Baltimore: John Murphy Company, 1916. pp. 85–86.
- Rev. Richard Stanton. A Menology of England and Wales, or, Brief Memorials of the Ancient British and English Saints Arranged According to the Calendar, Together with the Martyrs of the 16th and 17th Centuries. London: Burns & Oates, 1892. p. 131.

Greek Sources

- Great Synaxaristes: (in Greek) 24 ΜΑΡΤΙΟΥ. ΜΕΓΑΣ ΣΥΝΑΞΑΡΙΣΤΗΣ.
- (in Greek) Συναξαριστής. 24 Μαρτίου. ECCLESIA.GR. (H ΕΚΚΛΗΣΙΑ ΤΗΣ ΕΛΛΑΔΟΣ).

Russian Sources

- (in Russian) 6 апреля (24 марта). Православная Энциклопедия под редакцией Патриарха Московского и всея Руси Кирилла (электронная версия). (Orthodox Encyclopedia - Pravenc.ru).
- (in Russian) 24 марта (ст.ст.) 6 апреля 2013 (нов. ст.). Русская Православная Церковь Отдел внешних церковных связей. (DECR).
