= March 26 (Eastern Orthodox liturgics) =

Day in the Eastern Orthodox liturgical calendar

Eastern Orthodox liturgical calendar
March 25	March 26	March 27
March 26 O.S. ≍ April 8 N.S. March 26 N.S ≍ March 13 O.S.

An Eastern Orthodox cross

March 26 in Eastern Orthodox liturgical calendars is a feast day and a day of commemoration of saints and martyrs. Although some Orthodox churches use the Revised Julian Calendar and others use the traditional Julian calendar, the fixed commemorations for their respective March 26 are broadly the same, no matter which calendar is used. (Note: Despite the dates being the same, the days to which they refer typically differ by 13 days. The notation Old Style or O.S. is sometimes used to indicate a date in the traditional Julian Calendar (the "Old Calendar"). The notation New Style or N.S. indicates a date in the Revised Julian calendar (the "New Calendar").)

== Feasts ==
- Synaxis of the Archangel Gabriel.
- Apodosis (Leavetaking) of the Annunciation. (Note: "On the Leavetaking of the Feast of the Annunciation, the Church commemorates the Archangel Gabriel, who announced the great mystery of the Incarnation of Christ to the Virgin Mary. There is no period of Afterfeast due to Great Lent.")

== Saints ==
- Martyr Codratus (Quadratus), Emmanuel and Theodosius, and with them 40 other martyrs, who suffered under Diocletian (284-305) (Note: "Also, the holy martyrs Quadratus, Theodosius, Emmanuel, and forty others.")
- Hieromartyr Theodore, with Irenaeus the Deacon, and Serapion and Ammonius the lectors, in Pentapolis in Libya (304) (Note: "At Pentapolis, in Libya, the birthday of the holy martyrs Theodore, bishop, Irenaeus, deacon, Serapion and Ammonius, lectors.")
- Hieromartyr Irenaeus, Bishop of Sirmium in Hungary (304) (see also: March 25)
- Hieromartyr Montanus, priest, and his wife Maxima, at Sirmium (ca. 304)
- Martyrs Philemon and Domninus of Thessalonica, in Italy. (see also: March 21)
- Hieromartyr Eusebius, Bishop of Kival, and Martyr Pullius the Reader.
- Saint Eutychius, Subdeacon, of Alexandria (356) (Note: "At Alexandria, the holy martyrs Eutychius and others, who died by the sword for the Catholic faith, in the time of Constantine, under the Arian bishop George.")
- Holy 26 Martyrs in Gothia by burning, under the Crimean Goths, under the Gothic King Jungerich (375-383), including: (Note: "Another record of the same persecution is contained in the Greek Calendar, which celebrates, on March 26th, the martyrdom of six-and-twenty Goths, of whom two, Bathusis and Verekas, were presbyters, and the rest were of the laity, both men and women. These suffered, according to this record, in the reign of Valentinian and Valens, through the cruelty of the Gothic king, Jungerich, by whom they were burnt together in a church. Then follows a long account of the removal of the relics by a pious queen, who, with her daughter, brought them to Cyzicum. The memory of the same event is also preserved in the fragments of a Gothic calendar, which were discovered in the library at Milan early in this century. One of the seven festivals therein noted is on the 29th of the month preceding November, which is marked as "Remembrance of the martyrs among the Goth-folk who were burnt with Vereka, a presbyter ('papa'), and with Batvin, the servant of the Catholic Church."") (Note: (in Greek) Οἱ Ἅγιοι Εἴκοσι Ἕξι Μάρτυρες οἱ ἐν Γοτθίᾳ μαρτυρήσαντες. Τὰ ὀνόματα τῶν Ἁγίων Μαρτύρων εἶναι: Βαθούσης ἢ Ἀαθούσης πρεσβύτερος μετὰ τῶν δύο υἱῶν καὶ τριῶν θυγατέρων αὐτοῦ, μοναχὸς Ἀρπύλας, Ἀβίππας, Ἁγνάς, Ἡγάθραξ, Ἡσκόος, Θέρμας ἢ Θέρθας, Ρύαξ ἢ Ρύϊας, Σεΐμβλας ἢ Σουΐμβλας, Σιγήτζας ἢ Σίδητζας, Σίλας, Σουηρίλας, Φίλγας; καὶ οἱ γυναῖκες: Ἀλλάς, Ἀνιμαΐς, Ἄννα, Βάρις ἢ Βάρκα, Λαρίσσα, Μαμύκα, Μωϊκὼ καὶ Οὐϊρκώ.)

- Bathusius and Bercus, presbyters;
- Monk-martyr Arpilus;
- Laymen martyrs: Abibus, Agnus (Hagias), Reasus (Ruias), Igathrax (Egathrax), Iscoeus (Iskous, Eskoes, Escoos), Silas, Signicus (Sigetzas), Sonerilas (Swerilas), Suimbalus (Swemblas), Thermus (Therthas), Phillus (Philgas);
- Laywomen martyrs: Anna, Alla (Alas), Larissa (Baren, Beride), Monco (Manca, Moiko), Mamica (Kamika), Uirko (Virko, Oneko), Animais (Animaida, Anemais), Gaatha the queen of the Goths, and Duklida (Dulcilla).

- Saint Malchus of Chalcis in Syria (4th century) (see also: November 24)
- Venerable Abraham of Mount Latros (Latrium), ascetic. (see also: March 24)
- Venerable Stephen the Confessor and Wonderworker, Abbot of Tryglia (815)
- Venerable Basil the Younger, anchorite near Constantinople (944 or 952)

== Pre-Schism Western saints ==
- Martyr Castulus, an officer of the palace in Rome, tortured and buried alive for helping other Orthodox (286) (Note: "AT Rome, on the Lavican road, St. Castulus, martyr, chamberlain in the palace of the emperor. For harboring the Christians, he was three times suspended by the hands, three times cited before the tribunals, and as he persevered in the confession of the Lord, he was thrown into a pit, overwhelmed with a mass of sand, and thus obtained the crown of martyrdom.") (see also: December 18)
- Martyrs Peter, Marcian, John, Thecla, Cassian and others, at Rome. (Note: "In the same city, the crowning of the holy martyrs Peter, Marcian, Jovinus, Thecla, Cassian, and others.")
- Saint Felix of Trier, consecrated Bishop of Trier in Germany by St Martin of Tours in 386 (ca. 400)
- Saint Sincheall, a disciple of St Patrick and founder of the monastery of Killeigh in Offaly, where there were 150 monks (5th century)
- Saint Govan, hermit of Pembrokeshire (586)
- Saint Mocheallóg (Cellog, Mottelog, Motalogus), patron saint of Kilmallock in Limerick in Ireland (ca.639)
- Saint Braulio of Saragossa in Iberia, Bishop and Confessor (646) (Note: A monk at the monastery of St Engratia in Saragossa in Spain, he was ordained priest by his own brother, John, whom he succeeded as Archbishop of Saragossa.)
- Saint Garbhan (Garbán), a saint who left his name to Dungarvan in Ireland (7th century)
- Saint Ludger, missionary bishop in the Netherlands and northwestern Germany (809) (Note: Born in Frisia, he returned to his homeland from England, but mainly preached in Westphalia of which he is the Apostle. His gentleness did more to attract the Saxons to Christ than all the brutal armies of Charlemagne. He lived for a time at Montecassino in Italy. He was the first Bishop of Münster in Germany.)
- Saint Bertilo, Abbot of St Benignus Abbey in Dijon in France, martyred with several of his monks at the altar when the Vikings sacked the monastery (ca. 878-888)
- Saint Felicitas of Padua, nun, probably at Sts Cosmas and Damian in Padua in Italy (9th century)

== Post-Schism Orthodox saints ==
- New Martyr George of Sofia, at Adrianople (1437)

=== New martyrs and confessors ===
- Martyr Parasceva Kochneva (1939)

== Other commemorations ==
- Melitina Icon of the Theotokos.

== Icon gallery ==
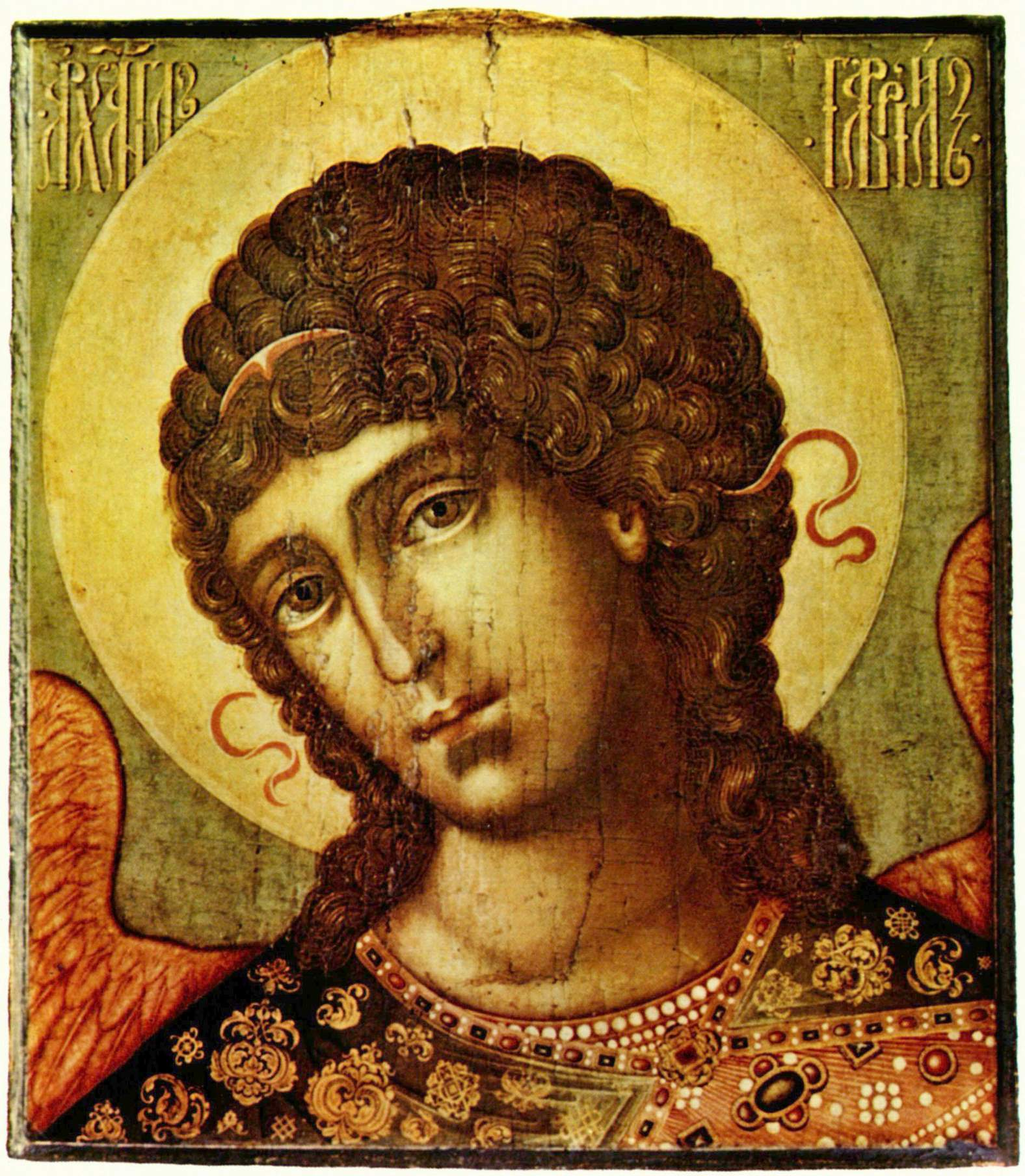
Archangel Gabriel (by Simon Ushakov).

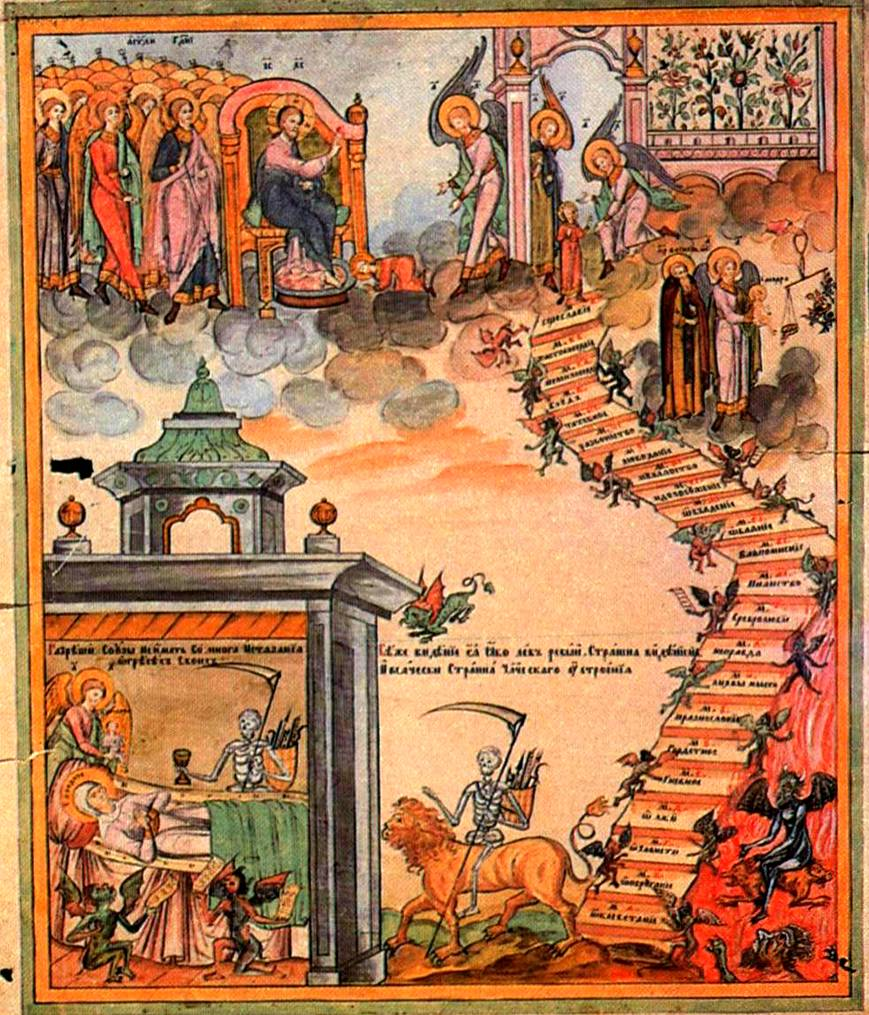
Icon of a vision granted by Basil the Younger to his servant, of the death of St Theodora and the aerial toll houses.

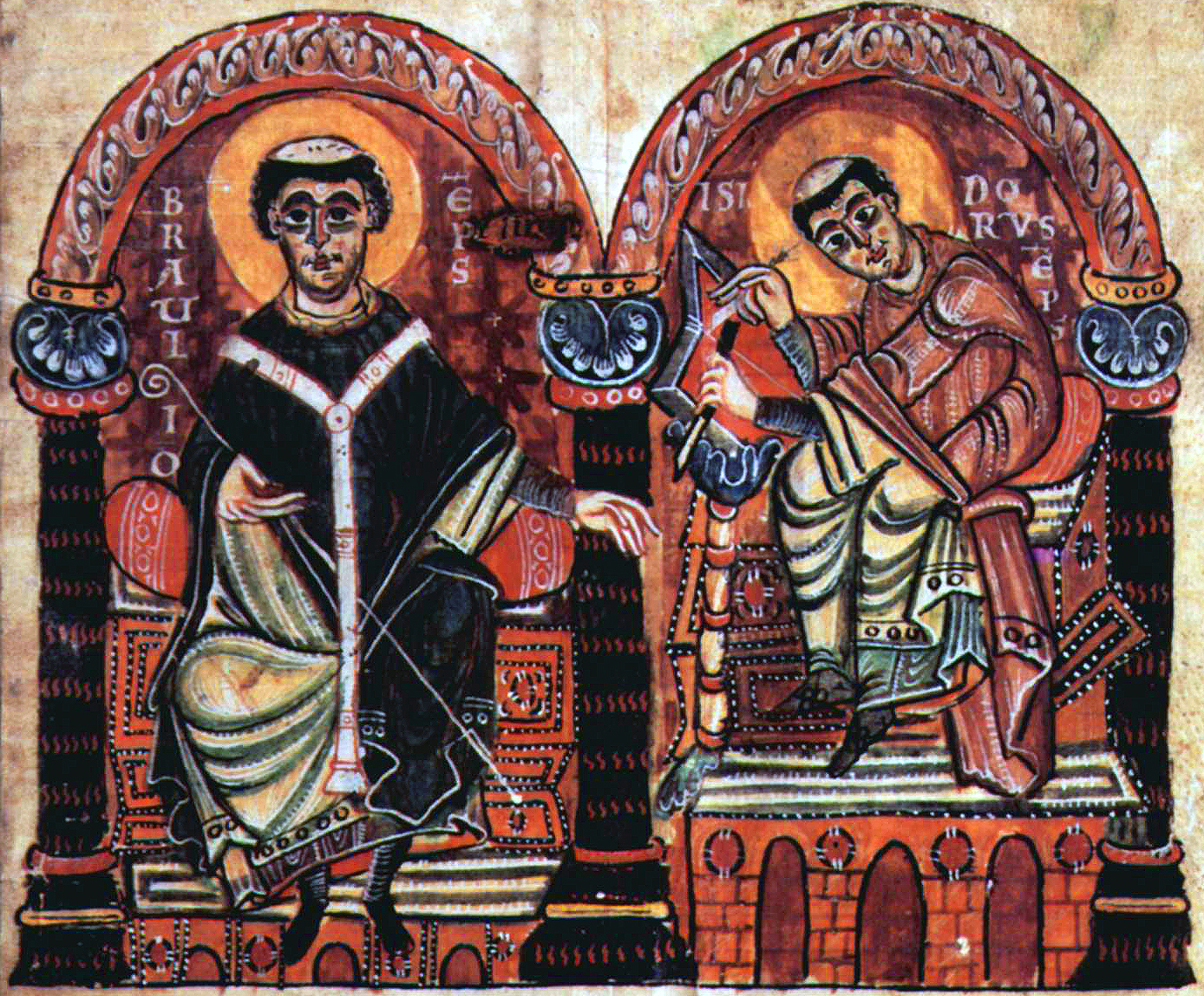
St. Braulio and Isidore of Seville (10th century)

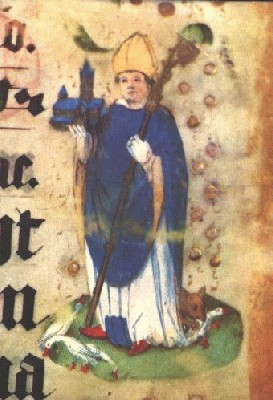
St. Ludger

== Sources ==
- March 26/April 8. Orthodox Calendar
- April 8 / March 26. Holy Trinity Russian Orthodox Church (A parish of the Patriarchate of Moscow).
- March 26. OCA - The Lives of the Saints.
- The Autonomous Orthodox Metropolia of Western Europe and the Americas (ROCOR). St. Hilarion Calendar of Saints for the year of our Lord 2004. St. Hilarion Press (Austin, TX). p. 24.
- March 26. Latin Saints of the Orthodox Patriarchate of Rome.
- The Roman Martyrology. Transl. by the Archbishop of Baltimore. Last Edition, According to the Copy Printed at Rome in 1914. Revised Edition, with the Imprimatur of His Eminence Cardinal Gibbons. Baltimore: John Murphy Company, 1916. pp. 87–88.
- Rev. Richard Stanton. A Menology of England and Wales, or, Brief Memorials of the Ancient British and English Saints Arranged According to the Calendar, Together with the Martyrs of the 16th and 17th Centuries. London: Burns & Oates, 1892. pp. 134–135.

Greek Sources

- Great Synaxaristes: (in Greek) 26 ΜΑΡΤΙΟΥ. ΜΕΓΑΣ ΣΥΝΑΞΑΡΙΣΤΗΣ.
- (in Greek) Συναξαριστής. 26 Μαρτίου. ECCLESIA.GR. (H ΕΚΚΛΗΣΙΑ ΤΗΣ ΕΛΛΑΔΟΣ).

Russian Sources

- (in Russian) 8 апреля (26 марта). Православная Энциклопедия под редакцией Патриарха Московского и всея Руси Кирилла (электронная версия). (Orthodox Encyclopedia - Pravenc.ru).
- (in Russian) 26 марта (ст.ст.) 8 апреля 2013 (нов. ст.). Русская Православная Церковь Отдел внешних церковных связей. (DECR).
