= Kennocha =

Scottish nun and saint (d. 1007)

Saint Kennocha
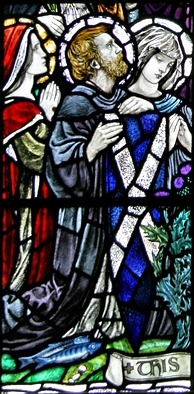
- Saints Medana, Andrew, and Kennocha by Karl Parsons (1910)
- Born: Scotland
- Residence: Fife
- Died: 1007; Scotland
- Venerated in: Roman Catholicism; Eastern Orthodoxy
- Feast: March 13 (Roman Catholicism); March 25 (Eastern Orthodoxy)

Saint Kennocha (or Kennoch, Kennotha, Kevoca, Kyle, Enoch; died 1007) was a Scottish nun who is venerated as a saint in the area of Glasgow, Scotland. She is remembered on 13 and 25 March. She is included in the 1921 Book of Saints by the Monks of Ramsgate.

== Dunbar's account ==
The hagiographer Agnes B. C. Dunbar wrote:

St. Kennocha, March 13, V., +1007. Of a royal family of Scotland, she was very beautiful, endowed with every virtue, and desirous to consecrate herself a spouse to Christ. Meeting with great opposition from her parents and worldly friends, she underwent on that account many persecutions and hardships, which she overcame by patience and constancy. She led an angelical life for many years, and went to our Lord in a good old age, in the beginning of the 11th century. She was buried in a church, called from her, St. Kinnoch's, now commonly known by the name of Kyle. She is honoured among the Scots. Butler says she made her profession in a great nunnery in Fife, and that a church in Glasgow is still called St Kennock's Kirk. AA.88. Brit, Sancta. Canisius. Adam King, Butler. Mr. Gammack says the same as Kennotha and Kevoca.

== Butler's account ==
According to Alban Butler:

[In the reign of King Malcolm II.] FROM her infancy she was a model of humility, meekness, modesty and devotion. Though an only daughter, and the heiress of a rich and noble family, fearing lest the poison which lurks in the enjoyment of perishable goods, should secretly steal into her affections, or the noise of the world should be a hinderance to her attention to heavenly things and spiritual exercises, she rejected all solicitations of suitors and worldly friends, and, in the bloom of life, made an entire sacrifice of herself to God, by making her religious profession in a great nunnery, in the county of Fife. In this holy state, by an extraordinary love of poverty and mortification, a wonderful gift of prayer, and purity or singleness of heart, she attained to the perfection of all virtues. Several miracles which she wrought made her name famous among men, and she passed to God in a good old age, in the year 1007. Several churches in Scotland bore her name, particularly one near Glasgow, still called St. Kennoch’s Kirk, and another called by an abbreviation of her name Kyle, in which her relics were formerly kept with singular veneration. In the Aberdeen Breviary she is honoured with a particular prayer. She is mentioned by Adam King, in his calendar, and an account of her life is given us in the Chronicle of Scone.

== St Quivox ==
The name of the church and parish of St. Quivox in Ayrshire, Scotland, is thought to be a variant of Santa Kennocha Virgo in Coila, or Saint Kennocha. Other forms of the name include St. Kevock, St Kenochis, St. Cavocks and St. Evox. However, the Oxford Dictionary of Saints says that the church of Quivox is named after Saint Kevoca, often thought to be Scottish, who was in fact the Irish saint Mo-Choemoc.

== Sources ==
- Butler, Alban (1821), The lives of the fathers, martyrs, and other principal saints, vol. III
- Dunbar, Agnes B. C. (1904), A Dictionary of Saintly Women, vol. 1, London: George Bell & Sons – via djvu
- "Mochoemoc", The Oxford Dictionary of Saints – via Oxford Reference
- "Saint Kennocha of Fife", CatholicSaints.Info
- "St Quivox", GenUKI
