= April 7 (Eastern Orthodox liturgics) =

Day in the Eastern Orthodox liturgical calendar

Eastern Orthodox liturgical calendar
April 6	April 7	April 8
April 7 O.S. ≍ April 20 N.S. April 7 N.S ≍ March 25 O.S.

An Eastern Orthodox cross

April 7 in Eastern Orthodox liturgical calendars is a feast day and a day of commemoration of saints and martyrs. Although some Orthodox churches use the Revised Julian Calendar and others use the traditional Julian calendar, the fixed commemorations for their respective April 7 are broadly the same, no matter which calendar is used. (Note: Despite the dates being the same, the days to which they refer typically differ by 13 days. The notation Old Style or O.S. is sometimes used to indicate a date in the traditional Julian Calendar (the "Old Calendar"). The notation New Style or N.S. indicates a date in the Revised Julian calendar (the "New Calendar").)

== Saints ==
- Saint Hegesippus the Chronicler, of Palestine (c. 180) (Note: A Jew born in Jerusalem, he spent twenty years of his life in Rome. He is considered to be the father of Church History but only a few chapters of his work remain.) (Note: "At Rome, St. Hegesippus, who lived near the time of the Apostles. He came to Rome whilst Anicetus was Sovereign Pontiff, and remained till the accession of Eleutherius. He wrote the history of the Church in a simple style, from the Passion of our Lord to his own time, and delineated in his narrative the character of those whose lives he imitated.")
- Hieromartyr Rufinus the Deacon, the Martyr Aquilina, and 200 soldiers with them, at Sinope (c. 249-251)
- Martyr Calliopios, at Pompeiopolis in Cilicia (304)
- Saint Serapion the Sindonite, monk, of Egypt (5th century) (see also: March 21 and May 14)
- Saint George, Patriarch of Jerusalem (807)
- Saint George the Confessor (George the Standard-Bearer), Bishop of Mytilene, exiled to Kherson (820)

== Pre-Schism Western saints ==
- Saint Saturninus, Bishop of Verona and Confessor (4th century)
- Hieromartyr Epiphanius, Bishop in North Africa, with Rufinus the Deacon, Donatus, and Companions – thirteen martyrs.
- Venerable Brynach of Wales (Brenach, Bemach, Bemacus) (6th century) (Note: He built a cell and church at a place called Carn-Englyi (Mountain of the Angels), overhanging Nefyn in Gwynedd in Wales.) (Note: "Brenach, otherwise called Brynach or Bernach, was a hermit, who inhabited a lonely cell in the neighbourhood of Milford, and led a life of great sanctity and wonderful austerity. No ancient record of his life has been preserved, and his Acts, as they are now found, being written many centuries after his death, cannot be considered authentic.")
- Saint Finan (Finnian) (6th century) (Note: Born in Munster in Ireland, he was a disciple of St Brendan. He founded a monastery at Kinnitty in Offaly of which he is the patron.)
- Saint Goran (Guron, Goronus, Woranus), who lived at Bodmin before St Petroc (6th century) (Note: Several churches are dedicated to him in Cornwall.)
- Saints Llewellyn (LLywelyn) and Gwrnerth, monks from Wales who lived in Welshpool and later on Bardsey (6th century)
- Saint Gibardus, Abbot of Luxeuil in France during the invasion of the Huns (ca. 888) (Note: He and his monks fled from the monastery but the barbarians found them and martyred them.)

== Post-Schism Orthodox saints ==
- Venerable Leucius, Abbot of Volokolamsk (1492)
- Venerable Nilus of Sora, founder of Sora Skete, Belozersk (1508) (see also: May 7)
- Venerable Daniel of Pereyaslavl, founder of St. Daniel Monastery (1540)
- Saint Peter Kononovich-Sahaydachny (1622)
- Venerable Gerasimus the Byzantine, Hieromonk, of Patmos (1770)
- Saint Gabriel, Archbishop of Ryazan and Zaraisk (1862)
- Venerable Schemamonk Agapitus the Blind, of Valaam Monastery (1905)
- Venerable Savvas the New of Kalymnos (1947) (see also: March 25 - os; also the Fifth Sunday of Great Lent)
- Saint Justin (Popovic), Archimandrite of Ćelije Monastery in Serbia and Confessor of Traditional Orthodoxy (1979) (Note: His service is celebrated on June 1.) (Due to OS Annunciation moved to: June 1)

=== New martyrs and confessors ===
- New Hieromartyr Arcadius Dobronravov, Archpriest, of Tsivilsk, Chuvashia (1933)
- Martyr Eudocia Pavlovoy (1939)

== Other commemorations ==
- Icon of the Mother of God "of Byzantium" (The Byzantine Icon) (732) (Note: The Byzantine Icon of the Mother of God appeared on 7 April 732. It was transferred to Russia from Rome. (Commemorated on April 7, May 1).)
- Uncovering of the relics (1517) of St. Serapion, Archbishop of Novgorod (1516)
- Repose of Schemamonk Theodore of Svir (1822)
- Repose of Schemamonk Agapitus the Blind, of Valaam (1905)

== Icon gallery ==
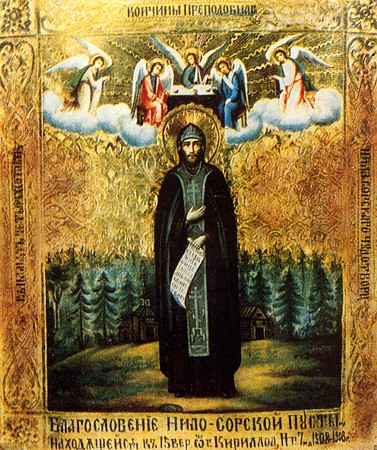
Venerable Nilus of Sora.

== Sources ==
- April 7 / April 20. Orthodox Calendar (pravoslavie.ru).
- April 20 / April 7. Holy Trinity Russian Orthodox Church (A parish of the Patriarchate of Moscow).
- April 7. OCA - The Lives of the Saints.
- The Autonomous Orthodox Metropolia of Western Europe and the Americas. St. Hilarion Calendar of Saints for the year of our Lord 2004. St. Hilarion Press (Austin, TX). p. 27.
- April 7. Latin Saints of the Orthodox Patriarchate of Rome.
- The Roman Martyrology. Transl. by the Archbishop of Baltimore. Last Edition, According to the Copy Printed at Rome in 1914. Revised Edition, with the Imprimatur of His Eminence Cardinal Gibbons. Baltimore: John Murphy Company, 1916. p. 98.
- Rev. Richard Stanton. A Menology of England and Wales, or, Brief Memorials of the Ancient British and English Saints Arranged According to the Calendar, Together with the Martyrs of the 16th and 17th Centuries. London: Burns & Oates, 1892. pp. 146–149.

Greek Sources

- Great Synaxaristes: (in Greek) 7 Απριλίου. Μεγασ Συναξαριστησ.
- (in Greek) Συναξαριστής. 7 Απριλίου. ecclesia.gr. (H Εκκλησια Τησ Ελλαδοσ).

Russian Sources

- (in Russian) 20 апреля (7 апреля). Православная Энциклопедия под редакцией Патриарха Московского и всея Руси Кирилла (электронная версия). (Orthodox Encyclopedia - Pravenc.ru).
- (in Russian) 7 апреля (ст.ст.) 20 апреля 2013 (нов. ст.). Русская Православная Церковь Отдел внешних церковных связей.
