= April 8 (Eastern Orthodox liturgics) =

Day in the Eastern Orthodox liturgical calendar

Eastern Orthodox liturgical calendar
April 7	April 8	April 9
April 8 O.S. ≍ April 21 N.S. April 8 N.S ≍ March 26 O.S.

An Eastern Orthodox cross

April 8 in Eastern Orthodox liturgical calendars is a feast day and a day of commemoration of saints and martyrs. Although some Orthodox churches use the Revised Julian Calendar and others use the traditional Julian calendar, the fixed commemorations for their respective April 8 are broadly the same, no matter which calendar is used. (Note: Despite the dates being the same, the days to which they refer typically differ by 13 days. The notation Old Style or O.S. is sometimes used to indicate a date in the traditional Julian Calendar (the "Old Calendar"). The notation New Style or N.S. indicates a date in the Revised Julian calendar (the "New Calendar").)

== Saints ==
- Holy Apostles of the Seventy:

- Herodion, Agabus, Asyncritus of Hyrcania, Rufus, Phlegon, Hermes, and those who suffered with them (1st century)

- Martyr Pausilipus of Heraclea in Thrace (ca. 117–138)
- Monk-martyrs Josiah and Joseph, of Mt. Kharasam, Persia (c. 341)
- Saint Celestine, Pope of Rome (432) (Note: Born in the Campagna in Italy, he succeeded Boniface I as Pope of Rome in 422. He supported St Germanus of Auxerre against Pelagianism and condemned Nestorianism.) (see also: April 6 - West)

== Pre-Schism Western saints ==
- Martys Januarius, Maxima and Macaria, in North Africa.
- Martyr Concessa, a martyr venerated from early times in Carthage in North Africa.
- Saint Amantius of Como, successor of St Provinus as Bishop of Como in Italy (440)
- Saint Perpetuus, Bishop of Tours in France (490)
- Saint Redemptus, Bishop of Ferentini in Italy (586)

== Post-Schism Orthodox saints ==
- Saint Philaret of Seminara (Filarete of Calabria), Calabria (ca. 1070)
- Saint Niphont, Bishop of Novgorod (1156)
- Venerable Rufus the Recluse (Rufus the Obedient), of the Kiev Caves (14th century) (see also: April 6)
- New Martyr John (Koulikas) (1564) (see also: April 18)
- New Martyr John Naukliros ("the Navigator"), burned alive on Kos (1669)

=== New martyrs and confessors ===
- New Hieromartyr Sergius Rodakovsky, Archpriest, of Tal, Belorussia (1933)

== Other commemorations ==
- Spanish Icon of the Most Holy Theotokos (792) (Note: The Spanish Icon of the Most Holy Theotokos, which is one of the Panachranta type, depicts the Mother of God seated upon a throne.)
- Repose of Righteous Helen Voronova (1916), disciple of Elder Barsanuphius of Optina Monastery (ru).

== Icon gallery ==
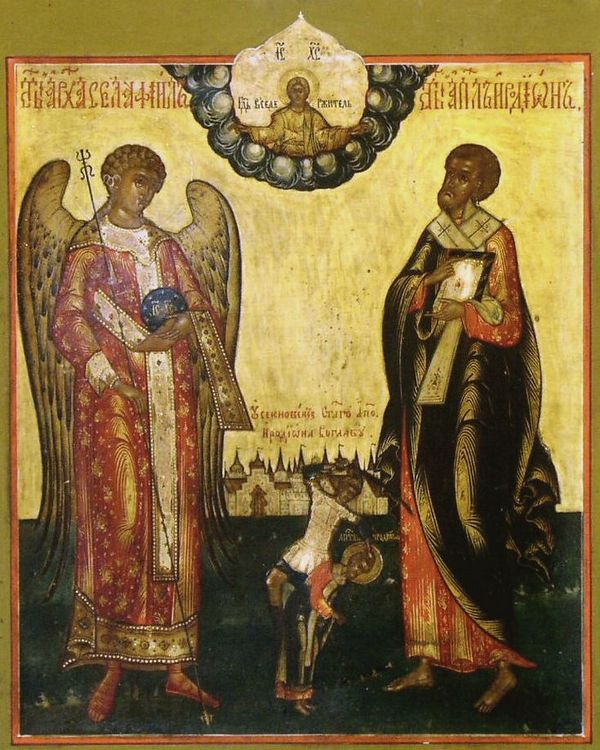
Herodion of Patras and Archangel Selaphiel (1840, Russia).

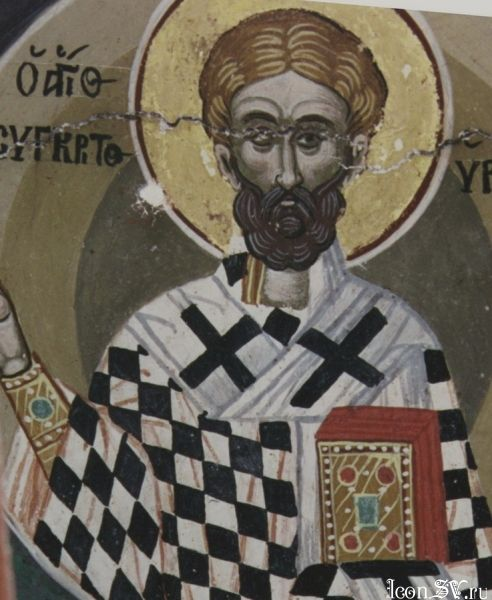
Asyncritus of Hyrcania.

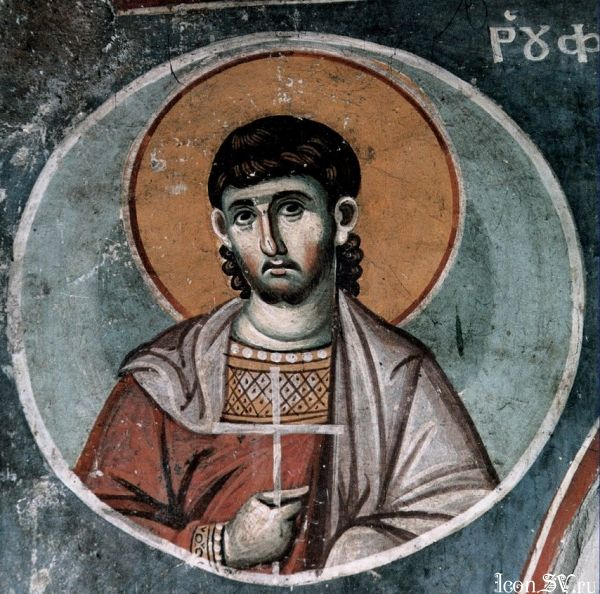
Rufus of Thebes.

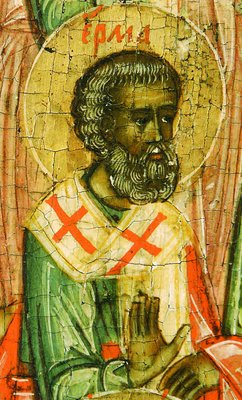
Hermes of Philippopolis.

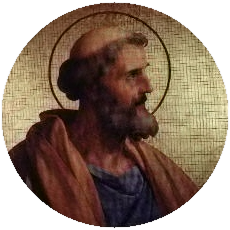
Saint Celestine, Pope of Rome.

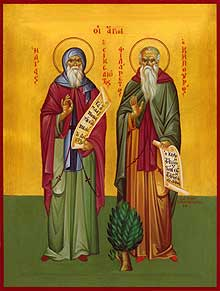
St. Philaret of Seminara (right side), with St. Elias.

== Sources ==
- April 8 / April 21. Orthodox Calendar (pravoslavie.ru).
- April 21 / April 8. Holy Trinity Russian Orthodox Church (A parish of the Patriarchate of Moscow).
- April 8. OCA - The Lives of the Saints.
- The Autonomous Orthodox Metropolia of Western Europe and the Americas. St. Hilarion Calendar of Saints for the year of our Lord 2004. St. Hilarion Press (Austin, TX). p. 27.
- April 8. Latin Saints of the Orthodox Patriarchate of Rome.
- The Roman Martyrology. Transl. by the Archbishop of Baltimore. Last Edition, According to the Copy Printed at Rome in 1914. Revised Edition, with the Imprimatur of His Eminence Cardinal Gibbons. Baltimore: John Murphy Company, 1916. p. 99.
- Rev. Richard Stanton. A Menology of England and Wales, or, Brief Memorials of the Ancient British and English Saints Arranged According to the Calendar, Together with the Martyrs of the 16th and 17th Centuries. London: Burns & Oates, 1892. p. 149.

Greek Sources

- Great Synaxaristes: (in Greek) 8 Απριλίου. Μεγασ Συναξαριστησ.
- (in Greek) Συναξαριστής. 8 Απριλίου. Eeclesia.gr. (H Εκκλησια Τησ Ελλαδοσ).

Russian Sources

- (in Russian) 21 апреля (8 апреля). Православная Энциклопедия под редакцией Патриарха Московского и всея Руси Кирилла (электронная версия). (Orthodox Encyclopedia - Pravenc.ru).
- (in Russian) 8 апреля (ст.ст.) 21 апреля 2013 (нов. ст.). Русская Православная Церковь Отдел внешних церковных связей.
