= Mariko Seyama =

Japanese announcer and former model (born 1980)

- 脊山 麻理子
- Born: April 8, 1980 (age 45); Bunkyō, Tokyo, Japan
- Occupations: Announcer, model
- Years active: 1997 -
- Agent: Shabell
- Website: Official profile

Mariko Seyama (脊山 麻理子, Seyama Mariko; born April 8, 1980, in Bunkyō, Tokyo, Japan) is a Japanese announcer and former model who is represented by the talent agency Shabell. She was an announcer for Nippon Television.

== Filmography (during NTV) ==
Year	Title	Notes
2004	Enparanaito	
	Teletsuku!	Corner charge
2005	TV Oja Manbō	
2005	NNN24	Super Sport 24
2005	Dai 2 Nippon Television	
2005	NNN News Spot	Weather caster
	Miracle Shape	
2006	O nē Mans	
2006	Oha!4 News Live	
2007	Radio de Culture	
2008	26-Jikan Chotto TV	
2008	Enta no Tenshi	
	Super Surprise	Tuesday regular
2009	Shoku wa Chienari	
2009	Han ni Yanokono-te ga Atta ka!	Irregular

== Filmography (as a free announcer) ==
Year	Title	Network	Notes	References
2010	Ichihachi	MBS	Guest	
2010	Time Shock	TV Asahi		
	Q-sama	TV Asahi		
2011	Bo Isuta!	BS-TBS		
2011	Sentan! Newcomer	Tokyo MX		
2011	Sokuhō! Battle Men	Fighting TV Samurai		
2013	Nippon Dandy	Tokyo MX		
2014	Kyōmoichinichi: Good Job Nippon	NBS		
2014	Nobuhiko Ōtani Kikimasu!	NBS	Assistant	
2014	Morning Cross	Tokyo MX	MC	
2014	Sunday Japon	TBS		
2014	Masahiro Nakai no mi ni Naru Toshokan	TV Asahi		
2014	Sanma no Super Karakuri TV	TBS		
2014	All-Star Thanksgiving	TBS		
	London Hearts	TV Asahi	Irregular appearances	

=== Drama ===
Year	Title	Role	Network	Notes
2014	Tokumei Tantei	Minori Harakawa	TV Asahi	Episode 6
