= Abippus =

Abippus (Abibus or Habib)

Saint
- Venerated in: Greek Orthodox Church
- Feast: 26 March

Abippus (also known as Abibus and Habib) is a saint of the Greek Orthodox Church. His feast day is 26 March.

== Sources ==
- Holweck, F. G. A Biographical Dictionary of the Saints. St. Louis, Missouri, US: B. Herder Book Co. 1924.
