= Savvas the New of Kalymnos =

Greek Orthodox saint

Saint Savvas the New of Kalymnos
- Icon at church entrance Kalymnos

Wonderworker, Iconographer and Confessor
- Born: 1862; Herakleitsa, Eastern Thrace, Ottoman Empire
- Died: 7 April 1947 (aged 85); Kalymnos, Greece
- Venerated in: Eastern Orthodoxy
- Canonized: 1992
- Feast: 7 April (25 March OC), The Fifth Sunday in Lent
- Patronage: Kalymnos

Saint Savvas of Kalymnos (also known as Saint Savvas the New) is the patron saint of the Greek island of Kalymnos, where he lived during the last twenty years of his life as the priest and spiritual father of the nuns of the Convent of All Saints. He was a great ascetic, confessor, icon painter, and miracle-worker. He is one of the recently recognized saints in the Ecumenical Patriarchate.

He died on 7 April 1947 and his remains were exhumed 10 years later in 1957. The feast dates of St. Savvas the New of Kalymnos are celebrated on various dates in different traditions, 7 April (25 March in the Old Calendar), and the fifth Sunday of Great Lent with St. Mary of Egypt.

== Life ==
Saint Savvas was born in 1862 in Herakleitsa, Eastern Thrace the only child of Constantinos and Smaragda both devout people, who were very poor. Upon his baptism he was given the name Vasilios.

As a young boy he had a calling for the monastic life and secretly left without his parents knowing for Mount Athos at the age of twelve where he entered St. Anne's Skete. Along with the monastic duties, this is where he learned iconography and Byzantine music.

He later traveled to Jerusalem for a pilgrimage to the holy sites. He arrived in 1887 and entered the monastery of St. George Hozeva and lived there for seventeen years as a hermit in the deserted and rugged cliffs. After serving for a period as a novice, he was tonsured a monk and given the name Savvas.

In 1890, he joined the brotherhood of the Abbot Kallinikos (from Alatsata of Asia Minor) and in 1902 was ordained a deacon. In 1903, a year later, he was ordained to the holy priesthood by Archbishop Nikodemos from Diokesaria. He spent almost 10 years in the desert by the Jordan where he led an austere life and occupied himself with prayer and iconography. His dwelling consisted of two cells which he reached by ascending up a rope ladder. This isolation was necessary for successful inner concentration and noetic prayer and he made great spiritual progress there.

Due to the irregularities caused by the raids of the Arabs in the Holy Land, and health reasons, St Savvas was forced to leave. He returned to the motherland - Greece where he searched for a quiet place to continue his monastic struggle. Originally he was attracted to the island of Patmos, where he lived for a while in the hermitage of Grava and later at the Monastery of St. John.

He later traveled for three years, throughout Greece, looking for a suitable place to stay. He visited Mount Athos, then the Monastery of Phaneromenis, then Salamina and finally the island of Hydra but in 1919, he was invited to stay at the island of Aegina, by St. Nektarios, to serve as a priest at the Convent of the Holy Trinity, and stayed for six years at this convent (from 1919 until 1925). There he taught the nuns the holy art of iconography and Byzantine music. This period was one of the most significant events in his biography due to his friendship with St. Nektarios; who was at the height of his spiritual development at this time. St Savvas had the opportunity to confess and receive counsel from the saint and the two held each other in highest esteem and regarded each other a saint. They were spiritual brothers and the best of friends.

St Savvas was the clergyman who conducted the funeral service for Saint Nektarios, and was also the one who painted the first icon of the saint.

One day St. Savvas asked the abbess not to let anyone disturb him for forty days, during which he remained confined to his cell in which the nuns could hear constant conversation (between the living Saint and the reposed Saint). After 40 days, he came out of his cell holding an icon of the saint. He handed it to the abbess and asked her to place it in the church for veneration. The abbess was surprised since Nektarios had not been formerly glorified ("canonized") as a saint, and was afraid that the convent would get into trouble. Although Savvas was always meek and humble, he insisted, and told her in a commanding manner: "You must show obedience. Take the icon and place it on the icon stand, and do not scrutinize the will of God." He knew the holiness and purity of St. Nektarios.

During the forty days he spent locked in the room where St Nektarios tomb was, the nuns could hear two voices having conversations, and believed the second voice was that of the recently departed St Nektarios, so the living and dead were having discussions.

Soon after the repose of St. Nektarios, the number of pilgrims to the convent increased rapidly due to the growing reputation of the saint as a miracle-worker. This greatly disrupted the quiet life that Saint Savvas loved and with the encouragement of the influential wealthy Kalymnian Gerasimos Zervos, he departed in 1925 and went to the island of Kalymnos.

There, he spent the last years of his life as the priest and spiritual father at the Convent of All Saints. As a confessor, he combined leniency with severity. He was lenient on certain sins and severe to others. For him Blasphemy against God and his saints was one of the greatest sins. He remained an ardent spiritual striver until the end of life and practiced extreme forms of self-restraint with regard to food, drink, and sleep. St. Savvas became an example of virtue to all who came into contact with him. Many smelled a heavenly fragrance in his presence and some even saw him rising above the ground as he stood at prayer.

Towards the end of his life, St. Savvas remained in a state of intense prayer and holy contrition. For three days he did not receive anyone and he gave his last counsels: requested love and obedience in Christ. When he was on the point of death taking his last breath, suddenly he received strength, brought his blessed small hands together, and clapped them repeatedly saying his last holy words: "The Lord! The Lord! The Lord," then he recited the hymn of the Annunciation which the nuns found odd as it was not the Annunciation with the new gregorian calendar, but only did the nuns realise later that at that point those following the old Julian calendar were celebrating the vesper feast for the Annunciation. Thus, he died on 7 April 1947 (which was 25 March for the Old Calendar -the eve of the feast of the Annunciation. Upon closing his eyes, one of the nuns saw the soul of the saint ascending in a golden cloud towards heaven. After 10 years when the saint's grave was opened, a heavenly fragrance emanated from the grave which covered the whole island of Kalymnos, this phenomenon was witnessed by many, including the local bishop who upsettingly and initially was refusing to grant permission to the nuns to exhume his relics (when after three years of his death St Savvas miraculously appeared to the nuns ordering them to exhume him as the side of his head was getting wet being buried with his head at the base of a water deposit-sterna in Greek) and only after following years of torment and dreams did the then Bishop Isidoros believe and allowed his relics to be exhumed, finding his whole body incorrupt and intact apart from a small section on his skull where a patch of his skin deteriorated because of the water leaking on him- as the Saint had said to the nuns!) This was a testament to the sanctity of the saint. Numerous miracles and healings have since been attributed to St. Savvas the New of Kalymnos.

== Hymns ==
Apolytikion
The offspring of Ganou and Horas,
the great glory of Kalymnos;
all blessed Savvas, our father;
you took the path of ascetic discipline,
attaining the pinnacle of achievement;
therefore intercede with Christ, our God,
for Him to save our souls.

Kontakion
Today the island of the Kalymnians celebrates your holy memory with a rejoicing heart;
for it possesses as truly God-given wealth,
your sacred body that has been glorified by God, O Father Savvas,
approaching which they receive health of both soul and body.

Megalynarion

Rejoice, thou new star of the Church,
the offspring of Thrace and the beauty of Kalymnos,
O God-inspired Savvas, fellow citizen of angels and equal of all the saints.

== Sources ==
- Fr Savas Pizanias (with the use and reference of St Savvas' original biography), Αγιος Σάββας ο Νέος, Papanikolaou Eds. 1993.
- Modern Orthodox Saints, Vol. 8. by Constantine Cavarnos, Institute for Byzantine and Modern Greek Studies, ISBN 0914744631.
