= Irenaeus of Sirmium =

4th century Illyrian Saint-bishop

Saint Irenaeus of Sirmium
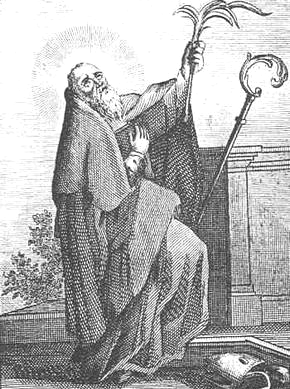
- Illustration of the Illyrian Saint.

Bishop of Sirmium
- Hometown: Sirmium
- Died: 304 AD
- Cause of death: Christian Martyr
- Honored in: Eastern Orthodoxy; Roman Catholicism
- Feast: 6th April.

Saint Irenaeus of Sirmium (died 304 AD) was an Illyrian bishop of Sirmium in Pannonia, which is now Sremska Mitrovica, Serbia.

== Life and martyrdom ==
He was bishop during the reign of Diocletian. Irenaeus refused to offer pagan sacrifices, even at the behest of his family. The governor of Roman Pannonia handed him over for torture. His parents, family members and friends including his wife and children tried to persuade and beg him to submit but he refused to denounce Christ and remained steadfast. After being cruelly tortured, he spent a very long time in prison, his martyrdom finally came. They marched him towards the Sava river where he knelt down and prayed to the Lord for his salvation and for his flock.

The last words of the Saint were:

‘Lord Jesus Christ, who deigned to suffer for the world's salvation, let your heavens open that your angels may take up the soul of your servant Irenaeus, who suffers all this for your name and for the people formed of your catholic church of Sirmium. I ask and implore your mercy to receive me and to strengthen them in your faith.’

He was then beheaded on 24 March 304. His body was thrown into the river and his feast day is on the 6th April.
