= June 10 =

June 10 this year in various calendars
- Wednesday, 10 June 2026
Other calendars
Akan	Fowukuo
Armenian	25 Margach 1475
Aztec	Teotleco 11, 9 Quiyahuitl
Babylonian	23 Ayaru, 2337 SE
Balinese pawukon	Menga, Pasah, Jaya, Pon, Tungleh, Buda of Sungsang, Guru, Dangu, Sri
Bengali	27 Joishtho, BS 1433
Chinese	Yin Wood Rabbit・Wall Mansion; 25 Sìyue, Bǐngwǔnián (Mangzhong, 11 days until Xiazhi)
Common Era	10 June 2026 CE
Coptic	3 Paoni, AM 1742
Egyptian	25 Phaophi, 2775 NE
Ethiopian	3 Sanē, 2018 Amätä Məhrät
French Republican	Décade III, Duodi de Prairial de l'Année 234 de la République
Gregorian	10 June, AD 2026
Hebrew	25 Sivan, AM 5786
Hindu	Revatī・Ayuṣmān; Solar: 27 Jyeṣṭha, 1948 SE; Lunisolar: Daśamī, Kṛishna pakṣa of Adhika Jyeṣṭha, 2083 VE; Rāudra・5127 KY・1,872,736
Icelandic	Miðvikudagur, 19 Skerpla 2026
Islamic	24 Dhu al-Hijjah, AH 1447 (using tabular method)
ISO week date	2026-W24-3
Japanese	25 Uzuki, Reiwa 8 (Bōshu, 11 days until Geshi)
Julian	28 May, AD 2026 (AM 7534)
Julian day	2461202
Maya	13.0.13.11.19; 12 Zotz, 9 Cauac
Roman	ante diem V Kalendas Iunias, MMDCCLXXIX AUC
Solar Hijri	20 Khordad, SH 1405
Tibetan	25 sa ga, me pho rta 2153 or 1772 or 1000

<<	June					>>
Su	Mo	Tu	We	Th	Fr	Sa
	1	2	3	4	5	6
7	8	9	10	11	12	13
14	15	16	17	18	19	20
21	22	23	24	25	26	27
28	29	30
2026

June 10 in recent years
2026 (Wednesday)
2025 (Tuesday)
2024 (Monday)
2023 (Saturday)
2022 (Friday)
2021 (Thursday)
2020 (Wednesday)
2019 (Monday)
2018 (Sunday)
2017 (Saturday)

June 10 is the 161st day of the year (162nd in leap years) in the Gregorian calendar; 204 days remain until the end of the year.

== Events ==
=== Pre-1600 ===
- 671 – Emperor Tenji of Japan introduces a water clock (clepsydra) called Rokoku. The instrument, which measures time and indicates hours, is placed in the capital of Ōtsu.
- 1190 – Third Crusade: Frederick I Barbarossa drowns in the river Saleph while leading an army to Jerusalem.
- 1225 – Pope Honorius III issues the bull Vineae Domini custodes in which he approves the mission of Dominican friars to Morocco.
- 1329 – The Battle of Pelekanon is the last attempt of the Byzantine Empire to retain its cities in Asia Minor.
- 1358 – Battle of Mello: The peasant forces of the Jacquerie are crushed by the army of the French nobility.
- 1422 – Ottoman Sultan Murad II besieges Constantinople, but is ultimately unsuccessful.
- 1523 – Copenhagen is surrounded by the army of Frederick I of Denmark, as the city will not recognise him as the successor of Christian II of Denmark.
- 1539 – Council of Trent: Pope Paul III sends out letters to his bishops, delaying the Council due to war and the difficulty bishops had traveling to Venice.
- 1596 – Willem Barents and Jacob van Heemskerk discover Bear Island.

=== 1601–1900 ===
- 1619 – Thirty Years' War: Battle of Záblatí, a turning point in the Bohemian Revolt.
- 1624 – Signing of the Treaty of Compiègne between France and the Netherlands.
- 1692 – Salem witch trials: Bridget Bishop is hanged at Gallows Hill near Salem, Massachusetts, for "certaine Detestable Arts called Witchcraft and Sorceries".
- 1719 – Jacobite risings: Battle of Glen Shiel.
- 1782 – King Buddha Yodfa Chulaloke (Rama I) of Siam (modern day Thailand) is crowned.
- 1786 – A landslide dam on the Dadu River created by an earthquake ten days earlier collapses, killing 100,000 in the Sichuan province of China.
- 1793 – The Jardin des Plantes museum opens in Paris. A year later, it becomes the first public zoo.
- 1793 – French Revolution: Following the arrests of Girondin leaders, the Jacobins gain control of the Committee of Public Safety installing the revolutionary dictatorship.
- 1805 – First Barbary War: Yusuf Karamanli signs a treaty ending the hostilities between Tripolitania and the United States.
- 1829 – The first Boat Race between the University of Oxford and the University of Cambridge takes place on the Thames in London.
- 1838 – Myall Creek massacre: Twenty-eight Aboriginal Australians are murdered.
- 1854 – The United States Naval Academy graduates its first class of students.
- 1861 – American Civil War: Battle of Big Bethel: Confederate troops under John B. Magruder defeat a much larger Union force led by General Ebenezer W. Pierce in Virginia.
- 1863 – During the French intervention in Mexico, Mexico City is captured by French troops.
- 1864 – American Civil War: Battle of Brice's Crossroads: Confederate troops under Nathan Bedford Forrest defeat a much larger Union force led by General Samuel D. Sturgis in Mississippi.
- 1868 – Mihailo Obrenović III, Prince of Serbia is assassinated.
- 1871 – Sinmiyangyo: Captain McLane Tilton leads 109 US Marines in a naval attack on Han River forts on Kanghwa Island, Korea.
- 1873 – Russian forces under General von Kaufmann capture the city of Khiva from the Khanate of Khiva.
- 1878 – League of Prizren is established, to oppose the decisions of the Congress of Berlin and the Treaty of San Stefano, as a consequence of which the Albanian lands in the Balkans were being partitioned and given to the neighbor states of Serbia, Montenegro, Bulgaria, and Greece.
- 1886 – Mount Tarawera in New Zealand erupts, killing 153 people and burying the famous Pink and White Terraces. Eruptions continue for three months creating a large, 17 km (11 mi) long fissure across the mountain peak.
- 1898 – Spanish–American War: In the Battle of Guantánamo Bay, U.S. Marines begin the American invasion of Spanish-held Cuba.

=== 1901–present ===
- 1916 – The Arab Revolt against the Ottoman Empire is declared by Hussein bin Ali, Sharif of Mecca.
- 1918 – World War I: The Austro-Hungarian battleship SMS Szent István sinks off the Croatian coast after being torpedoed by an Italian MAS motorboat; the event is recorded by camera from a nearby vessel.
- 1924 – Fascists kidnap and kill Italian Socialist leader Giacomo Matteotti in Rome.
- 1935 – Dr. Robert Smith takes his last drink, and Alcoholics Anonymous is founded in Akron, Ohio, United States, by him and Bill Wilson.
- 1935 – Chaco War ends: A truce is called between Bolivia and Paraguay who had been fighting since 1932.
- 1940 – World War II: Fascist Italy declares war on France and the United Kingdom, beginning an invasion of southern France.
- 1940 – World War II: U.S. President Franklin D. Roosevelt denounces Italy's actions in his "Stab in the Back" speech at the graduation ceremonies of the University of Virginia.
- 1940 – World War II: Military resistance to the German occupation of Norway ends.
- 1942 – World War II: The Lidice massacre is perpetrated as a reprisal for the assassination of Obergruppenführer Reinhard Heydrich.
- 1944 – World War II: Six hundred forty-three men, women and children are massacred at Oradour-sur-Glane, France.
- 1944 – World War II: In Distomo, Boeotia, Greece, 228 men, women and children are massacred by German troops.
- 1944 – In baseball, 15-year-old Joe Nuxhall of the Cincinnati Reds becomes the youngest player ever in a major-league game.
- 1945 – World War II: Australian Imperial Forces land in Brunei Bay to liberate Brunei.
- 1947 – Saab produces its first automobile.
- 1957 – John Diefenbaker leads the Progressive Conservative Party of Canada to a stunning upset in the 1957 Canadian federal election, ending 22 years of Liberal Party government.
- 1960 – Trans Australia Airlines Flight 538 crashes near Mackay Airport in Mackay, Queensland, Australia, killing 29.
- 1963 – The Equal Pay Act of 1963, aimed at abolishing wage disparity based on sex, is signed into law by John F. Kennedy as part of his New Frontier Program.
- 1964 – United States Senate breaks a 75-day filibuster against the Civil Rights Act of 1964, leading to the bill's passage.
- 1967 – The Six-Day War ends: Israel and Syria agree to a cease-fire.
- 1977 – James Earl Ray escapes from Brushy Mountain State Penitentiary in Petros, Tennessee. He is recaptured three days later.
- 1980 – The African National Congress in South Africa publishes a call to fight from their imprisoned leader Nelson Mandela.
- 1982 – Lebanon War: The Syrian Arab Army defeats the Israeli Defense Forces in the Battle of Sultan Yacoub.
- 1987 – June Democratic Struggle: The June Democratic Struggle starts in South Korea, and people protest against the government.
- 1990 – British Airways Flight 5390 lands safely at Southampton Airport after a blowout in the cockpit causes the captain to be partially sucked from the cockpit. There are no fatalities.
- 1991 – Eleven-year-old Jaycee Lee Dugard is kidnapped in South Lake Tahoe, California; she would remain a captive until 2009.
- 1994 – China conducts a nuclear test for DF-31 warhead at Area C (Beishan), Lop Nur, its prominence being due to the Cox Report.
- 1996 – Peace talks begin in Northern Ireland without the participation of Sinn Féin.
- 1997 – Before fleeing his northern stronghold, Khmer Rouge leader Pol Pot orders the killing of his defense chief Son Sen and 11 of Sen's family members.
- 1999 – Kosovo War: NATO suspends its airstrikes after Slobodan Milošević agrees to withdraw Serbian forces from Kosovo.
- 2001 – Pope John Paul II canonizes Lebanon's first female saint, Saint Rafqa.
- 2002 – The first direct electronic communication experiment between the nervous systems of two humans is carried out by Kevin Warwick in the United Kingdom.
- 2003 – The Spirit rover is launched, beginning NASA's Mars Exploration Rover mission.
- 2008 – Sudan Airways Flight 109 crashes at Khartoum International Airport, killing 30 people.
- 2009 – Eighty-eight year-old James Wenneker von Brunn opens fire inside the United States Holocaust Memorial Museum and fatally shoots Museum Special Police Officer Stephen Tyrone Johns. Other security guards returned fire, wounding von Brunn, who was apprehended.
- 2018 – The Opportunity rover sends its last message back to Earth. The mission was finally declared over on February 13, 2019.
- 2024 – A plane crash in Malawi leaves 10 people dead, including the country's Vice President Saulos Chilima.
- 2025 – Eleven people are killed, including the perpetrator, and eleven others are injured, in a mass shooting at a secondary school in Graz, Austria.

== Births ==
=== Pre-1600 ===
- 867 – Emperor Uda of Japan (died 931)
- 940 – Abu al-Wafa' Buzjani, Persian mathematician and astronomer (died 998)
- 1213 – Fakhr-al-Din Iraqi, Persian poet and philosopher (died 1289)
- 1465 – Mercurino Gattinara, Italian statesman and jurist (died 1530)
- 1513 – Louis, Duke of Montpensier (1561–1582) (died 1582)
- 1557 – Leandro Bassano, Italian painter (died 1622)

=== 1601–1900 ===
- 1632 – Esprit Fléchier, French bishop and author (died 1710)
- 1688 – James Francis Edward Stuart, claimant to the English and Scottish throne (died 1766)
- 1713 – Princess Caroline of Great Britain (died 1757)
- 1716 – Carl Gustaf Ekeberg, Swedish physician and explorer (died 1784)
- 1753 – William Eustis, American physician and politician, 12th Governor of Massachusetts (died 1825)
- 1804 – Hermann Schlegel, German ornithologist and herpetologist (died 1884)
- 1819 – Gustave Courbet, French-Swiss painter and sculptor (died 1877)
- 1825 – Sondre Norheim, Norwegian-American skier (died 1897)
- 1832 – Edwin Arnold, English poet and journalist (died 1904)
- 1832 – Nicolaus Otto, German engineer (died 1891)
- 1832 – Stephen Mosher Wood, American lieutenant and politician (died 1920)
- 1835 – Rebecca Latimer Felton, American educator and politician (died 1930)
- 1839 – Ludvig Holstein-Ledreborg, Danish lawyer and politician, 19th Prime Minister of Denmark (died 1912)
- 1840 – Theodor Philipsen, Danish painter (died 1920)
- 1843 – Heinrich von Herzogenberg, Austrian composer and conductor (died 1900)
- 1851 – Cora Agnes Benneson, American attorney (died 1919)
- 1854 – Sarah Grand, Irish feminist writer (died 1943)
- 1859 – Emanuel Nobel, Swedish-Russian businessman (died 1932)
- 1862 – Mrs. Leslie Carter, American actress (died 1937)
- 1863 – Louis Couperus, Dutch author and poet (died 1923)
- 1864 – Ninian Comper, Scottish architect (died 1960)
- 1865 – Frederick Cook, American physician and explorer (died 1940)
- 1878 – Margarito Bautista, Nahua-Mexican evangelizer, theologian, and religious founder (died 1961)
- 1880 – André Derain, French painter and sculptor (died 1954)
- 1882 – Nils Økland, Norwegian Esperantist and teacher (died 1969)
- 1884 – Leone Sextus Tollemache, English captain (died 1917)
- 1886 – Sessue Hayakawa, Japanese actor and producer (died 1973)
- 1891 – Al Dubin, Swiss-American songwriter (died 1945)
- 1893 – Hattie McDaniel, American actress (died 1952)
- 1897 – Grand Duchess Tatiana Nikolaevna of Russia (died 1918)
- 1898 – Princess Marie-Auguste of Anhalt (died 1983)
- 1899 – Stanisław Czaykowski, Polish racing driver (died 1933)

=== 1901–present ===
- 1901 – Frederick Loewe, Austrian-American composer (died 1988)
- 1904 – Lin Huiyin, Chinese architect and poet (died 1955)
- 1907 – Fairfield Porter, American painter and critic (died 1975)
- 1907 – Dicky Wells, American jazz trombonist (died 1985) (Note: Wells's exact date of birth is unknown, but he is believed to have been born on June 10, 1907)
- 1909 – Lang Hancock, Australian soldier and businessman (died 1992)
- 1910 – Frank Demaree, American baseball player and manager (died 1958)
- 1910 – Howlin' Wolf, American singer-songwriter and guitarist (died 1976)
- 1911 – Ralph Kirkpatrick, American harpsichord player and musicologist (died 1984)
- 1911 – Terence Rattigan, English playwright and screenwriter (died 1977)
- 1912 – Jean Lesage, Canadian lawyer and politician, 11th Premier of Quebec (died 1980)
- 1913 – Tikhon Khrennikov, Russian pianist and composer (died 2007)
- 1913 – Benjamin Shapira, German-Israeli biochemist and academic (died 1993)
- 1914 – Oktay Rıfat Horozcu, Turkish poet and playwright (died 1988)
- 1915 – Saul Bellow, Canadian-American novelist, essayist and short story writer, Nobel Prize laureate (died 2005)
- 1916 – Peride Celal, Turkish author (died 2013)
- 1916 – William Rosenberg, American entrepreneur, founded Dunkin' Donuts (died 2002)
- 1918 – Patachou, French singer and actress (died 2015)
- 1918 – Barry Morse, English-Canadian actor and director (died 2008)
- 1919 – Haidar Abdel-Shafi, Palestinian physician and politician (died 2007)
- 1919 – Kevin O'Flanagan, Irish footballer, rugby player, and physician (died 2006)
- 1921 – Prince Philip, Duke of Edinburgh, Prince of the United Kingdom, Prince of Greece and Denmark, Consort of Queen Elizabeth II (died 2021)
- 1921 – Jean Robic, French cyclist (died 1980)
- 1922 – Judy Garland, American actress and singer (died 1969)
- 1922 – Bill Kerr, South African-Australian actor (died 2014)
- 1922 – Mitchell Wallace, Australian rugby league player (died 2016)
- 1923 – Paul Brunelle, Canadian singer-songwriter and guitarist (died 1994)
- 1923 – Robert Maxwell, Czech-English captain, publisher, and politician (died 1991)
- 1924 – Friedrich L. Bauer, German mathematician, computer scientist, and academic (died 2015)
- 1925 – Leo Gravelle, Canadian ice hockey player (died 2013)
- 1925 – Nat Hentoff, American historian, author, and journalist (died 2017)
- 1925 – James Salter, American novelist and short-story writer (died 2015)
- 1926 – Bruno Bartoletti, Italian conductor (died 2013)
- 1926 – Lionel Jeffries, English actor, screenwriter and film director (died 2010)
- 1927 – Claudio Gilberto Froehlich, Brazilian zoologist (died 2023)
- 1927 – László Kubala, Hungarian footballer, coach, and manager (died 2002)
- 1927 – Lin Yang-kang, Chinese politician, 29th Vice Premier of the Republic of China (died 2013)
- 1927 – Johnny Orr, American basketball player and coach (died 2013)
- 1927 – Eugene Parker, American astrophysicist and academic (died 2022)
- 1928 – Maurice Sendak, American author and illustrator (died 2012)
- 1929 – James McDivitt, American general, pilot, and astronaut (died 2022)
- 1929 – Ian Sinclair, Australian farmer and politician, 42nd Australian Minister for Defence
- 1929 – Thomas Taylor, Baron Taylor of Blackburn, British Labour Party politician (died 2016)
- 1929 – E. O. Wilson, American biologist, author, and academic (died 2021)
- 1930 – Aranka Siegal, Czech-American author and Holocaust survivor
- 1930 – Carmen Cozza, American baseball and football player (died 2018)
- 1930 – Theo Sommer, German journalist (died 2022)
- 1930 – Chen Xitong, Chinese politician, 8th Mayor of Beijing (died 2013)
- 1931 – Bryan Cartledge, English academic and diplomat, British Ambassador to Russia
- 1931 – João Gilberto, Brazilian singer-songwriter and guitarist (died 2019)
- 1932 – Pierre Cartier, French mathematician and academic (died 2024)
- 1933 – Chuck Fairbanks, American football player and coach (died 2013)
- 1933 – F. Lee Bailey, American criminal defense attorney (died 2021)
- 1934 – Peter Gibson, English lawyer and judge
- 1934 – Tom Pendry, Baron Pendry, English politician (died 2023)
- 1935 – Vic Elford, English racing driver (died 2022)
- 1935 – Lu Jiaxi, Chinese self-taught mathematician (died 1983)
- 1935 – Yoshihiro Tatsumi, Japanese author and illustrator (died 2015)
- 1936 – Marion Chesney, Scottish novelist, (a.k.a. M.C. Beaton) (died 2019)
- 1938 – Rahul Bajaj, Indian businessman and politician (died 2022)
- 1938 – Violetta Villas, Belgian-Polish singer-songwriter and actress (died 2011)
- 1938 – Vasanti N. Bhat-Nayak, Indian mathematician and academic (died 2009)
- 1940 – Augie Auer, American-New Zealand meteorologist (died 2007)
- 1940 – John Stevens, English drummer (died 1994)
- 1941 – Mickey Jones, American drummer (died 2018)
- 1941 – Shirley Owens, American singer
- 1941 – Jürgen Prochnow, German actor
- 1941 – David Walker, Australian racing driver
- 1942 – Gordon Burns, Northern Irish journalist
- 1942 – Chantal Goya, French singer and actress
- 1942 – Arthur Hamilton, Lord Hamilton, Scottish lawyer and judge
- 1942 – Preston Manning, Canadian politician
- 1943 – Simon Jenkins, English journalist and author
- 1943 – Sigríður Jóhannesdóttir, Icelandic politician
- 1944 – Ze'ev Friedman, Polish-Israeli weightlifter (died 1972)
- 1944 – Rick Price, English rock bass player (died 2022)
- 1947 – Michel Bastarache, Canadian businessman, lawyer, and jurist
- 1947 – Ken Singleton, American baseball player and sportscaster
- 1947 – Robert Wright, English air marshal
- 1950 – Elías Sosa, Dominican-American baseball player
- 1951 – Dan Fouts, American football player and sportscaster
- 1951 – Tony Mundine, Australian boxer
- 1951 – Burglinde Pollak, German pentathlete
- 1952 – Kage Baker, American author (died 2010)
- 1953 – Eileen Cooper, English painter and academic
- 1953 – John Edwards, American lawyer and politician
- 1953 – Garry Hynes, Irish director and producer
- 1953 – Don Maitz, American artist
- 1953 – Christine St-Pierre, Canadian journalist and politician
- 1954 – Moya Greene, Canadian businesswoman
- 1954 – Rich Hall, American actor, producer, and screenwriter
- 1955 – Annette Schavan, German theologian and politician
- 1955 – Andrew Stevens, American actor and producer
- 1958 – Elain Harwood, English architectural historian (died 2023)
- 1958 – Yu Suzuki, Japanese game designer and producer
- 1959 – Carlo Ancelotti, Italian footballer and manager
- 1959 – Ernie C, American heavy metal guitarist, songwriter, and producer
- 1959 – Eliot Spitzer, American lawyer and politician, 54th Governor of New York
- 1960 – Nandamuri Balakrishna, Indian film actor and politician
- 1961 – Kelley and Kim Deal, American singer-songwriters and musicians
- 1961 – Maxi Priest, English singer-songwriter
- 1962 – Gina Gershon, American actress, singer and author
- 1962 – Anderson Bigode Herzer, Brazilian poet and author (died 1982)
- 1962 – Wong Ka Kui, Hong Kong singer-songwriter and guitarist (died 1993)
- 1962 – Tzi Ma, Hong Kong American character actor
- 1962 – Brent Sutter, Canadian ice hockey player and coach
- 1963 – Brad Henry, American lawyer and politician, 26th Governor of Oklahoma
- 1963 – Jeanne Tripplehorn, American actress
- 1965 – Susanne Albers, German computer scientist and academic
- 1965 – Elizabeth Hurley, English model, actress, and producer
- 1965 – Joey Santiago, American alternative rock musician
- 1966 – David Platt, English footballer and manager
- 1967 – Emma Anderson, English singer-songwriter and guitarist
- 1967 – Darren Robinson, American rapper (died 1995)
- 1967 – Elizabeth Wettlaufer, Canadian nurse and serial killer
- 1968 – Bill Burr, American comedian and actor
- 1968 – Derek Dooley, American football player and coach
- 1969 – Craig Hancock, Australian rugby league player
- 1969 – Ronny Johnsen, Norwegian footballer
- 1969 – Kate Snow, American journalist
- 1970 – Mike Doughty, American singer-songwriter and guitarist
- 1970 – Katsuhiro Harada, Japanese game designer, director, and producer
- 1970 – Alex Santos, Filipino journalist
- 1970 – Shane Whereat, Australian rugby league player
- 1970 – Sarah Wixey, Welsh sport shooter
- 1971 – JoJo Hailey, American singer
- 1971 – Bobby Jindal, American journalist and politician, 55th Governor of Louisiana
- 1971 – Bruno Ngotty, French footballer
- 1971 – Erik Rutan, American singer-songwriter, guitarist, and producer
- 1971 – Kyle Sandilands, Australian radio and television host
- 1972 – Steven Fischer, American director and producer
- 1972 – Radmila Šekerinska, Macedonian politician, Prime Minister of the Republic of Macedonia
- 1972 – Sundar Pichai, Indian-American businessman
- 1972 – Eric Upashantha, Sri Lankan cricketer
- 1973 – Faith Evans, American singer-songwriter, producer, and actress
- 1973 – Flesh-n-Bone, American rapper and actor
- 1973 – Pokey Reese, American baseball player
- 1974 – Dustin Lance Black, American screenwriter, director, film and television producer, and LGBT rights activist
- 1975 – Henrik Pedersen, Danish footballer
- 1976 – Alari Lell, Estonian footballer
- 1976 – Esther Ouwehand, Dutch politician
- 1976 – Hadi Saei, Iranian martial artist
- 1977 – Adam Darski (Nergal), Polish singer-songwriter and guitarist
- 1977 – Mike Rosenthal, American football player and coach
- 1978 – Raheem Brock, American football player
- 1978 – Subhash Khot, Indian-American mathematician and computer scientist
- 1979 – Evgeni Borounov, Russian ice dancer and coach
- 1979 – Kostas Louboutis, Greek footballer
- 1980 – Jessica DiCicco, American actress and voice actress
- 1980 – Matuzalém, Brazilian footballer
- 1980 – Ovie Mughelli, American football player
- 1980 – Dmitri Uchaykin, Russian ice hockey player (died 2013)
- 1980 – Daniele Seccarecci, Italian bodybuilder (died 2013)
- 1981 – Mat Jackson, English racing driver
- 1981 – Albie Morkel, South African cricketer
- 1981 – Andrey Yepishin, Russian sprinter
- 1982 – Tara Lipinski, American figure skater
- 1982 – Princess Madeleine, Duchess of Hälsingland and Gästrikland
- 1982 – Ana Lúcia Souza, Brazilian ballerina and journalist
- 1983 – Jade Bailey, Barbadian athlete
- 1983 – Marion Barber III, American football player (died 2022)
- 1983 – Aaron Davey, Australian footballer
- 1983 – Leelee Sobieski, American actress and producer
- 1983 – Steve von Bergen, Swiss footballer
- 1984 – Johanna Kedzierski, German sprinter
- 1984 – Dirk Van Tichelt, Belgian martial artist
- 1984 – Betsy Sodaro, American actress
- 1985 – Richard Chambers, Irish rower
- 1985 – Celina Jade, Hong Kong-American actress
- 1985 – Kaia Kanepi, Estonian tennis player
- 1985 – Dane Nielsen, Australian rugby league player
- 1985 – Andy Schleck, Luxembourger cyclist
- 1985 – Vasilis Torosidis, Greek footballer
- 1986 – Al Alburquerque, Dominican baseball player
- 1986 – Marco Andreolli, Italian footballer
- 1987 – Martin Harnik, German-Austrian footballer
- 1987 – James Maynard, British mathematician
- 1987 – Amobi Okoye, Nigerian-American football player
- 1988 – Jeff Teague, American basketball player
- 1989 – David Miller, South African cricketer
- 1989 – Mustapha Carayol, Gambian footballer
- 1989 – Alexandra Stan, Romanian singer-songwriter, dancer, and model
- 1991 – Alexa Scimeca Knierim, American figure skater
- 1992 – Kate Upton, American model and actress
- 1996 – Wen Junhui, Chinese singer and actor
- 1997 – Cheung Ka-long, Hong Kong foil fencer, 2020 Olympic champion
- 1998 – Ryan Papenhuyzen, Australian rugby league player
- 1999 – Rafael Leão, Portuguese footballer
- 1999 – Blanche, Belgian singer
- 2001 – Julien Alfred, Saint Lucian sprinter

== Deaths ==
=== Pre-1600 ===
- AD 38 – Julia Drusilla, Roman sister of Caligula (born 16 AD)
- 223 – Liu Bei, Chinese emperor (born 161)
- 779 – Emperor Daizong of Tang (born 727)
- 754 – Abul Abbas al-Saffah, Muslim caliph (born 721)
- 871 – Odo I, Frankish nobleman
- 903 – Cheng Rui, Chinese warlord
- 932 – Dong Zhang, Chinese general
- 942 – Liu Yan, emperor of Southern Han (born 889)
- 1075 – Ernest, Margrave of Austria (born 1027)
- 1141 – Richenza of Northeim (born 1087)
- 1190 – Frederick I, Holy Roman Emperor (born 1122)
- 1261 – Matilda of Brandenburg, Duchess of Brunswick-Lüneburg (born 1210)
- 1338 – Kitabatake Akiie, Japanese governor (born 1318)
- 1364 – Agnes of Austria (born 1281)
- 1424 – Ernest, Duke of Austria (born 1377)
- 1437 – Joan of Navarre, Queen of England (born 1370)
- 1468 – Idris Imad al-Din, supreme leader of Tayyibi Isma'ilism, scholar and historian (born 1392)
- 1552 – Alexander Barclay, English poet and author (born 1476)
- 1556 – Martin Agricola, German composer and theorist (born 1486)
- 1580 – Luís de Camões, Portuguese poet (born 1524–25)

=== 1601–1900 ===
- 1604 – Isabella Andreini, Italian actress (born 1562)
- 1607 – John Popham, English politician, Attorney General for England and Wales (born 1531)
- 1654 – Alessandro Algardi, Italian sculptor (born 1598)
- 1680 – Johan Göransson Gyllenstierna, Swedish lawyer and politician (born 1635)
- 1692 – Bridget Bishop, Colonial Massachusetts woman hanged as a witch during the Salem witch trials (born 1632)
- 1735 – Thomas Hearne, English historian and author (born 1678)
- 1753 – Joachim Ludwig Schultheiss von Unfriedt, German architect (born 1678)
- 1776 – Hsinbyushin, Burmese king (born 1736)
- 1776 – Leopold Widhalm, Austrian instrument maker (born 1722)
- 1791 – Toussaint-Guillaume Picquet de la Motte, French admiral (born 1720)
- 1811 – Charles Frederick, Grand Duke of Baden (born 1728)
- 1831 – Hans Karl von Diebitsch, Prussian-Russian field marshal (born 1785)
- 1836 – André-Marie Ampère, French physicist and mathematician (born 1775)
- 1849 – Thomas Robert Bugeaud, French general and politician (born 1784)
- 1849 – Robert Brown, Scottish botanist (born 1773)
- 1868 – Mihailo Obrenović III, Prince of Serbia (born 1823)
- 1899 – Ernest Chausson, French composer (born 1855)

=== 1901–present ===
- 1901 – Robert Williams Buchanan, Scottish poet, author, and playwright (born 1841)
- 1902 – Jacint Verdaguer, Catalan priest and poet (born 1845)
- 1906 – Richard Seddon, English-New Zealand politician, 15th Prime Minister of New Zealand (born 1845)
- 1909 – Edward Everett Hale, American minister, historian, and author (born 1822)
- 1914 – Ödön Lechner, Hungarian architect (born 1845)
- 1918 – Arrigo Boito, Italian author, poet, and composer (born 1842)
- 1923 – Pierre Loti, French soldier and author (born 1850)
- 1924 – Giacomo Matteotti, Italian lawyer and politician (born 1885)
- 1926 – Antoni Gaudí, Spanish architect, designed the Park Güell (born 1852)
- 1930 – Adolf von Harnack, German historian and theologian (born 1851)
- 1934 – Frederick Delius, English composer and educator (born 1862)
- 1936 – John Bowser, English-Australian politician, 26th Premier of Victoria (born 1856)
- 1937 – Robert Borden, Canadian lawyer and politician, 8th Prime Minister of Canada (born 1854)
- 1939 – Albert Ogilvie, Australian politician, 28th Premier of Tasmania (born 1890)
- 1940 – Marcus Garvey, Jamaican journalist and activist, founded the Black Star Line (born 1887)
- 1944 – Willem Jacob van Stockum, Dutch mathematician and academic (born 1910)
- 1946 – Jack Johnson, American boxer (born 1878)
- 1947 – Alexander Bethune, Canadian businessman and politician, 12th Mayor of Vancouver (born 1852)
- 1949 – Sigrid Undset, Danish-Norwegian novelist, essayist, and translator, Nobel Prize laureate (born 1882)
- 1955 – Margaret Abbott, Indian-American golfer (born 1876)
- 1958 – Angelina Weld Grimké, American journalist, poet, and playwright (born 1880)
- 1959 – Zoltán Meskó, Hungarian politician (born 1883)
- 1963 – Timothy Birdsall, English cartoonist (born 1936)
- 1965 – Vahap Özaltay, Turkish footballer and manager (born 1908)
- 1967 – Spencer Tracy, American actor (born 1900)
- 1971 – Michael Rennie, English actor (born 1909)
- 1973 – William Inge, American playwright and novelist (born 1913)
- 1974 – Prince Henry, Duke of Gloucester (born 1900)
- 1976 – Adolph Zukor, American film producer, co-founded Paramount Pictures (born 1873)
- 1982 – Rainer Werner Fassbinder, German actor, director, and screenwriter (born 1945)
- 1984 – Halide Nusret Zorlutuna, Turkish author and poet (born 1901)
- 1986 – Merle Miller, American author and playwright (born 1919)
- 1987 – Elizabeth Hartman, American actress (born 1943)
- 1988 – Louis L'Amour, American novelist and short story writer (born 1908)
- 1991 – Jean Bruller, French author and illustrator, co-founded Les Éditions de Minuit (born 1902)
- 1992 – Hachidai Nakamura, Chinese-Japanese pianist and composer (born 1931)
- 1993 – Les Dawson, English comedian, actor, writer and presenter (born 1931)
- 1996 – George Hees, Canadian soldier, football player, and politician (born 1910)
- 1996 – Jo Van Fleet, American actress (born 1915)
- 1998 – Jim Hearn, American baseball player (born 1921)
- 1998 – Hammond Innes, English author (born 1913)
- 2000 – Hafez al-Assad, Syrian general and politician, 18th President of Syria (born 1930)
- 2000 – Brian Statham, English cricketer (born 1930)
- 2001 – Leila Pahlavi, Princess of Iran (born 1970)
- 2002 – John Gotti, American mobster (born 1940)
- 2003 – Donald Regan, American colonel and politician, 11th White House Chief of Staff (born 1918)
- 2003 – Bernard Williams, English philosopher and academic (born 1929)
- 2003 – Phil Williams, Welsh academic and politician (born 1939)
- 2004 – Ray Charles, American singer-songwriter, pianist, and actor (born 1930)
- 2004 – Odette Laure, French actress and singer (born 1917)
- 2004 – Xenophon Zolotas, Greek economist and politician, 177th Prime Minister of Greece (born 1904)
- 2005 – Curtis Pitts, American aircraft designer, designed the Pitts Special (born 1915)
- 2007 – Augie Auer, American-New Zealand meteorologist (born 1940)
- 2008 – Chinghiz Aitmatov, Kyrgyzstani author and diplomat (born 1928)
- 2009 – Stelios Skevofilakas, Greek footballer (born 1940)
- 2010 – Basil Schott, American archbishop (born 1939)
- 2010 – Sigmar Polke, German painter and photographer (born 1941)
- 2011 – Brian Lenihan Jnr, Irish lawyer and politician, 25th Irish Minister for Finance (born 1959)
- 2012 – Piero Bellugi, Italian conductor (born 1924)
- 2012 – Warner Fusselle, American sportscaster (born 1944)
- 2012 – Will Hoebee, Dutch songwriter and producer (born 1947)
- 2012 – Georges Mathieu, French painter and academic (born 1921)
- 2012 – Joshua Orwa Ojode, Kenyan politician (born 1958)
- 2012 – George Saitoti, Kenyan economist and politician, 6th Vice-President of Kenya (born 1945)
- 2012 – Sudono Salim, Chinese-Indonesian businessman, founded Bank Central Asia (born 1916)
- 2012 – Gordon West, English footballer (born 1943)
- 2013 – Doug Bailey, American political consultant (born 1933)
- 2013 – Enrique Orizaola, Spanish footballer and coach (born 1922)
- 2013 – Barbara Vucanovich, American lawyer and politician (born 1921)
- 2014 – Marcello Alencar, Brazilian lawyer and politician, 57th Governor of Rio de Janeiro (born 1925)
- 2014 – Gary Gilmour, Australian cricketer and manager (born 1951)
- 2014 – Robert M. Grant, American theologian and academic (born 1917)
- 2014 – Jack Lee, American radio host and politician (born 1920)
- 2015 – Robert Chartoff, American film producer and philanthropist (born 1933)
- 2015 – Wolfgang Jeschke, German author and publisher (born 1936)
- 2016 – Christina Grimmie, American singer-songwriter (born 1994)
- 2016 – Gordie Howe, Canadian ice hockey player (born 1928)
- 2017 – Julia Perez, Indonesian singer and actress (born 1980)
- 2018 – Neal E. Boyd, American singer, winner of the 2008 season of America's Got Talent (born 1975)
- 2020 – Claudell Washington, American baseball player (born 1954)
- 2023 – Ted Kaczynski, American mathematician and domestic terrorist (born 1942)
- 2024 – Victims in the 2024 Chikangawa Dornier 228 crash:
  - Saulos Chilima, Malawian economist and politician (born 1973)
  - Patricia Shanil Muluzi, Malawian teacher, politician, and former First Lady of Malawi (born 1964)
- 2024 – Steele Hall, Australian politician, 36th Premier of South Australia (born 1928)
- 2025 – Suchinda Kraprayoon, Thai army general, 19th Prime Minister of Thailand (born 1933)
- 2026 – Bharathiraja, Indian film and television actor, writer, director, and producer (born 1941)

== Holidays and observances ==
- World Art Nouveau Day (Worldwide)
- Christian feast day:
  - Bogumilus
  - Blessed Diana degli Andalò
  - Blessed Edward Poppe
  - Getulius, Amancius, Cerealus and Primitivus
  - Guardian Angel of Portugal
  - John of Tobolsk (Russian Orthodox Church)
  - Landry of Paris
  - Maurinus of Cologne
  - Maximus of Aveia (or of Aquila)
  - Olivia
  - June 10 (Eastern Orthodox liturgics)
- Portugal Day, also Day of Camões (Portugal and the Portuguese communities)
