= June 10 (Eastern Orthodox liturgics) =

Day in the Eastern Orthodox liturgical calendar

Eastern Orthodox liturgical calendar
June 9	June 10	June 11
June 10 O.S. ≍ June 23 N.S. June 10 N.S ≍ May 28 O.S.

An Eastern Orthodox cross

June 10 in Eastern Orthodox liturgical calendars is a feast day and a day of commemoration of saints and martyrs. Although some Orthodox churches use the Revised Julian Calendar and others use the traditional Julian calendar, the fixed commemorations for their respective June 10 are broadly the same, no matter which calendar is used. (Note: Despite the dates being the same, the days to which they refer typically differ by 13 days. The notation Old Style or O.S. is sometimes used to indicate a date in the traditional Julian Calendar (the "Old Calendar"). The notation New Style or N.S. indicates a date in the Revised Julian calendar (the "New Calendar").)

== Saints ==
- Martyrs Alexander and Antonina, at Crodamon (c. 313) (see also May 3)
- Martyr Neaniscus the Wise of Alexandria.
- Hieromartyr Timothy of Prussa, Bishop of Prusa (c. 361–363) (Note: "At Prusias, in Bithynia, St. Timothy, bishop and martyr, under Julian the Apostate.")
- Martyr Zacharias, in Nicomedia. (Note: "At Nicomedia, St. Zachary, martyr.")
- Venerables Theophanes, monk, and Pansemne, former harlot, of Antioch (369)
- Saint Asterius, Bishop of Petra (4th century) (Note: "At Petra, in Arabia, St. Asterius, a bishop, who suffered much from the Ariahs for the Catholic faith. By the emperor Constantius he was banished to Africa, where he died a glorious confessor.")
- Venerable Canides, monk, of Cappadocia (c. 460)
- Saint Alexius of Bithynia, Bishop of Bithynia.
- Venerable Apollo, Bishop, reposed in peace.

== Pre-Schism Western saints ==
- Saints Crispulus and Restitutus, martyrs under Nero, either in Rome or else in Spain (1st century)
- Martyrs Getulius, Caerealis, Amantius and Primitivus, in Tivoli in Italy under Hadrian (c. 120) (Note: By tradition Getulius was the husband of St Symphorosa. He, his brother Amantius, and the two officers sent to capture him and converted by him, were clubbed to death in Tivoli in Italy under Hadrian.) (Note: "At Rome, on the Salarian road, the martyrdom of blessed Getulius, a noble and very learned man, and of his companions Cærealis, Amantius, and Primitivus. By order of the emperor Adrian, they were arrested by the ex-consul Licinius, scourged, thrown into prison, and then delivered to the flames. But as the fire did not injure them, their heads were crushed with clubs, and they thus terminated their martyrdom. Their bodies were taken up by Symphorosa, wife of blessed Getulius, and reverently interred in a sandpit on her own estate.")
- Saints Basilides, Tripos, Mandal and Companions, a group of twenty-three Orthodox martyred in Rome on the Aurelian Way under Aurelian (c. 270–275) (Note: "Also, at Rome, on the Aurelian way, the birthday of the Saints Basilides, Tripos, Mandales, and twenty other martyrs, under the emperor Aurelian, and Plato, governor of the city.")
- Saint Maximus of Naples, tenth Bishop of Naples in Italy (361) (Note: He reposed in exile and is honoured as a martyr.) (Note: "At Naples, in Campania, St. Maximus, bishop and martyr. For having vigorously defended the Nicene Creed, he was sent by the same emperor Constantius into exile, where he died worn out by his trials.")
- Saint Bassianus of Lodi, Bishop of Lodi in Lombardy (409)
- Saints Aresius, Rogatius and Companions, a group of seventeen martyrs in North Africa. (Note: "In Africa, the holy martyrs Aresius, Rogatus, and fifteen others.")
- Saint Olivia of Palermo, a virgin-martyr venerated in Palermo in Sicily and in Carthage in North Africa (463)
- Saint Censurius, the successor of St Germanus as Bishop of Auxerre in France (486)
- Saint Illadan (Illathan, Iolladhan), Bishop of Rathlihen in Offaly in Ireland (6th century)
- Saint Ithamar, Bishop of Rochester in England (656) (Note: "On the death of St. Paulinus at Rochester ITHAMAR was chosen to be his successor in that See, and received consecration from St. Honorius, the Archbishop. St. Ithamar was a native of Kent, and for virtue and learning deserved to be compared with his Roman predecessors. It fell to his lot, on the death of Honorius, to consecrate Frithona, better known as St. Deusdedit, who was also an Englishman, to be the new Metropolitan. The veneration in which St. Ithamar was held is attested by several churches' dedication in his honour. He was succeeded at Rochester by Damian.") (Note: "S. Ithamar, a man of Kent, as Bede informs us, was ordained by Archbishop Honorius, and appointed to the see of Rochester. He was a man of learning and piety. After his death miracles were wrought at his tomb, wherefore his body was translated by Gundulf, bishop of Rochester (A.D. 1077-1107).")
- Saint Landericus of Paris (Landry of Paris), Bishop of Paris in France (661) (Note: He founded the first hospital - Hôtel-Dieu - in Paris.)
- Venerable Evermund (Evermond, Ebremund), monastic founder, monk and abbot (c. 720) (Note: Born in Bayeux in France, he married but with his wife's consent founded several monasteries and convents, including Fontenay-Louvet near Séez, where he became monk and abbot. His wife had entered a convent as a nun.) (Note: "Evermund left Bayeux, where he was born, at an early age, to live at Court. His good qualities endeared him to the king, and he might have attained to honours had not his heart been drawn heavenwards. His wife, feeling the same desire to quit the world, he retired into a solitary place in Lower Normandy, and she entered a convent. He afterwards founded the abbey of Fontenay, and was its first abbot.")
- Saint Maurinus of Cologne, probably Abbot of St Pantaleon in Cologne in Germany, where he was martyred.
- Saint Landericus (Landry), a monk at Novalese Abbey in Savoy in Italy, drowned in the River Arc by evildoers (c. 1050)
- Saint Bardo, Abbot of Werden Abbey on the Ruhr, then Abbot of Hersfeld Abbey, also Archbishop of Mainz (1051)

== Post-Schism Orthodox saints ==
- Venerable Silouan (Silvanus) of the Far Caves in Kiev (13th-14th centuries)
- Blessed Cosmas, Fool-for-Christ, of Verkhoturye (1706)
- Saint John Maximovitch of Tobolsk, Metropolitan of Tobolsk and all Siberia (1715)
- Venerable new martyr Savvas of Stagira (Savvas Stageiritis) (1821)

=== New martyrs and confessors ===
- New Hieromartyrs Nicholas, and Basil Pobedonostsev, Priests (1918)
- Martyr Paul (1918)
- Venerable-Confessor Schema-Abbess Famar (Tamara) (Mardzhanova), a Georgian Schema-abbess of the St. Seraphim–Znamensky Skete (1936) (Note: See: (in Georgian) თამარ მარჯანიშვილი. ვიკიპედიაში. (Georgian Wikipedia).) (Note: See: (in Russian) Фамарь (Марджанова). Википе́дия. (Russian Wikipedia).)
- New Hieromartyr Timothy Ulyanov, Priest (1940)

== Other commemorations ==
- Uncovering and translation (1609) of the relics of St. Basil, Bishop of Ryazan (1295) (Note: See: (in Russian) Василий I (епископ Рязанский). Википе́дия. (Russian Wikipedia).)
- Synaxis of the Saints of Ryazan. (Note: See: (in Russian) Собор Рязанских святых. Википе́дия. (Russian Wikipedia).)
- Synaxis of the Saints of Siberia. (Note: See: Synaxis of All Saints of Siberia. Orthodoxwiki.; (in Russian) Собор Сибирских святых. Википе́дия. (Russian Wikipedia).)
- Repose of Elder Nahum of Solovki Monastery (1853)
- Repose of Schema-monk Sergius of Valaam Monastery (1860)

== Icon gallery ==
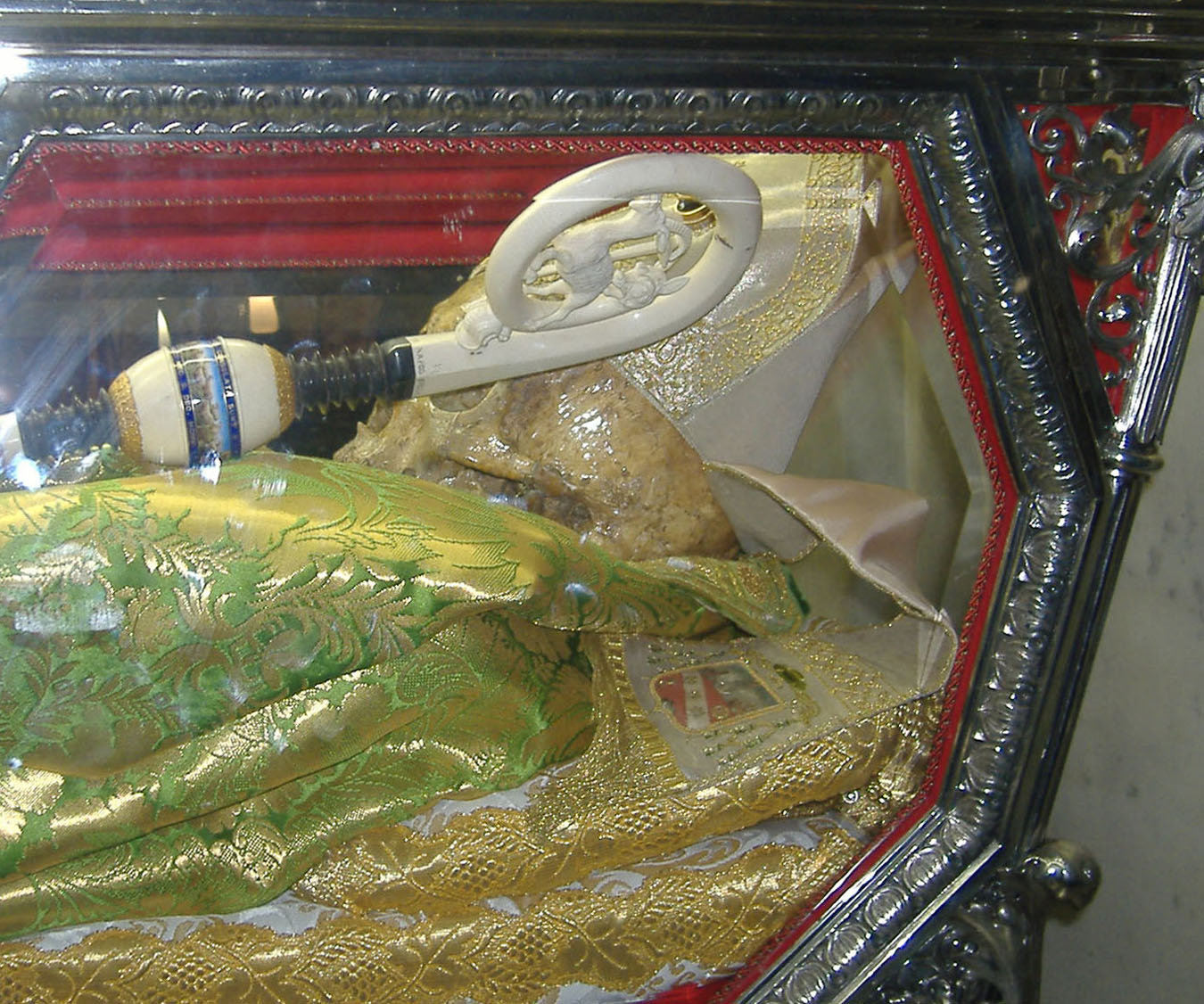
Relics of St. Bassianus of Lodi.

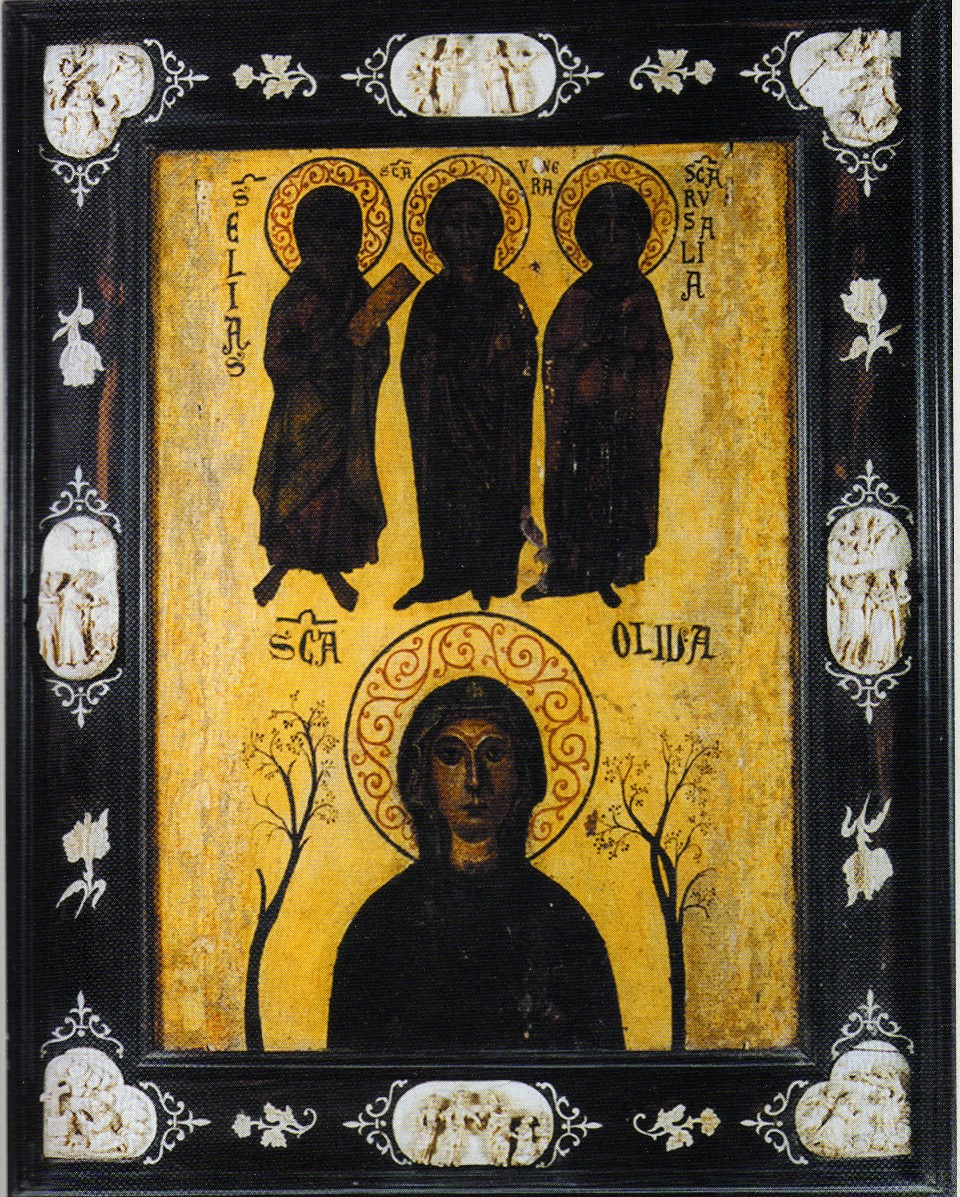
St. Olivia of Palermo, with Sts. Elias, Venera and Rosalia.

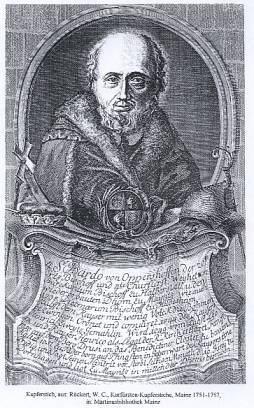
St. Bardo of Mainz.

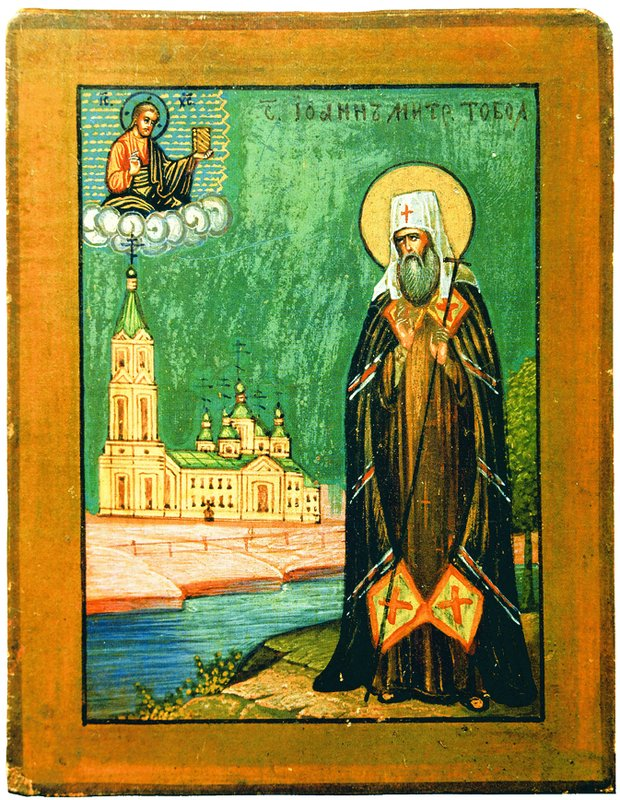
St. John of Tobolsk, Metropolitan of Tobolsk and all Siberia.

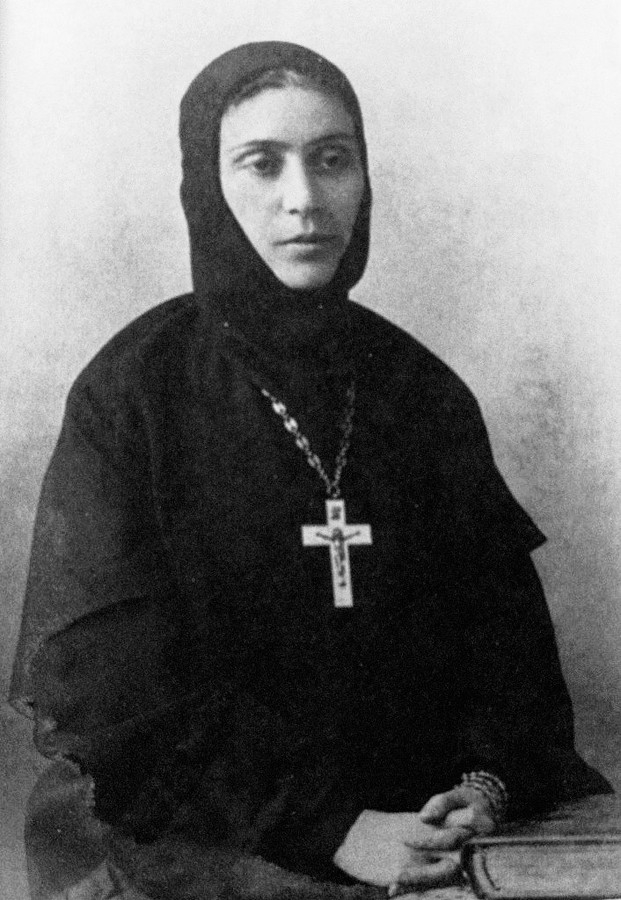
Venerable-Confessor Schema-Abbess Fomar (Mardzhanova).

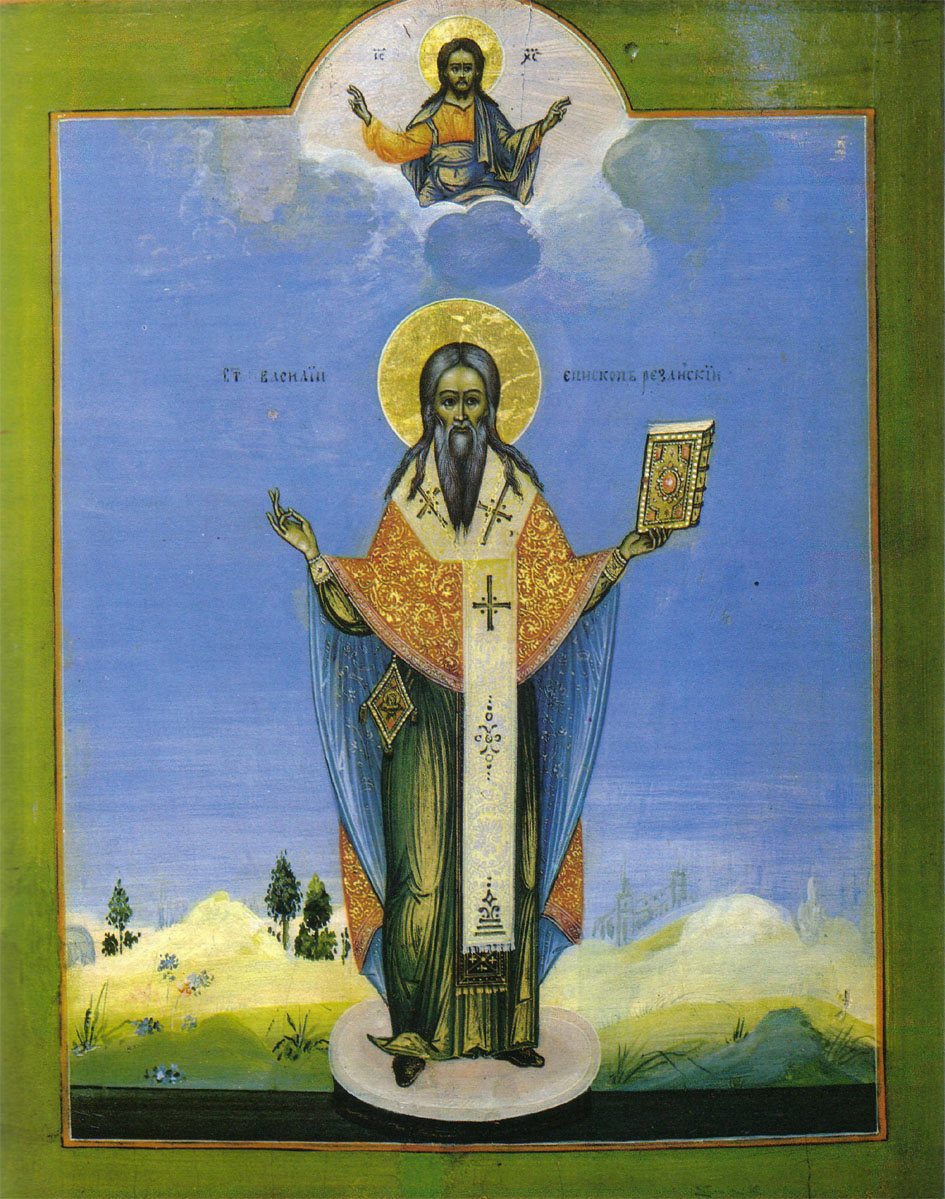
St. Basil, Bishop of Ryazan.

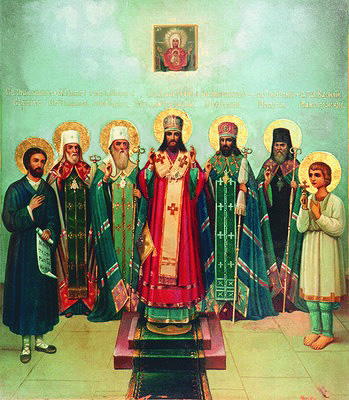
Synaxis of the Saints of Siberia.

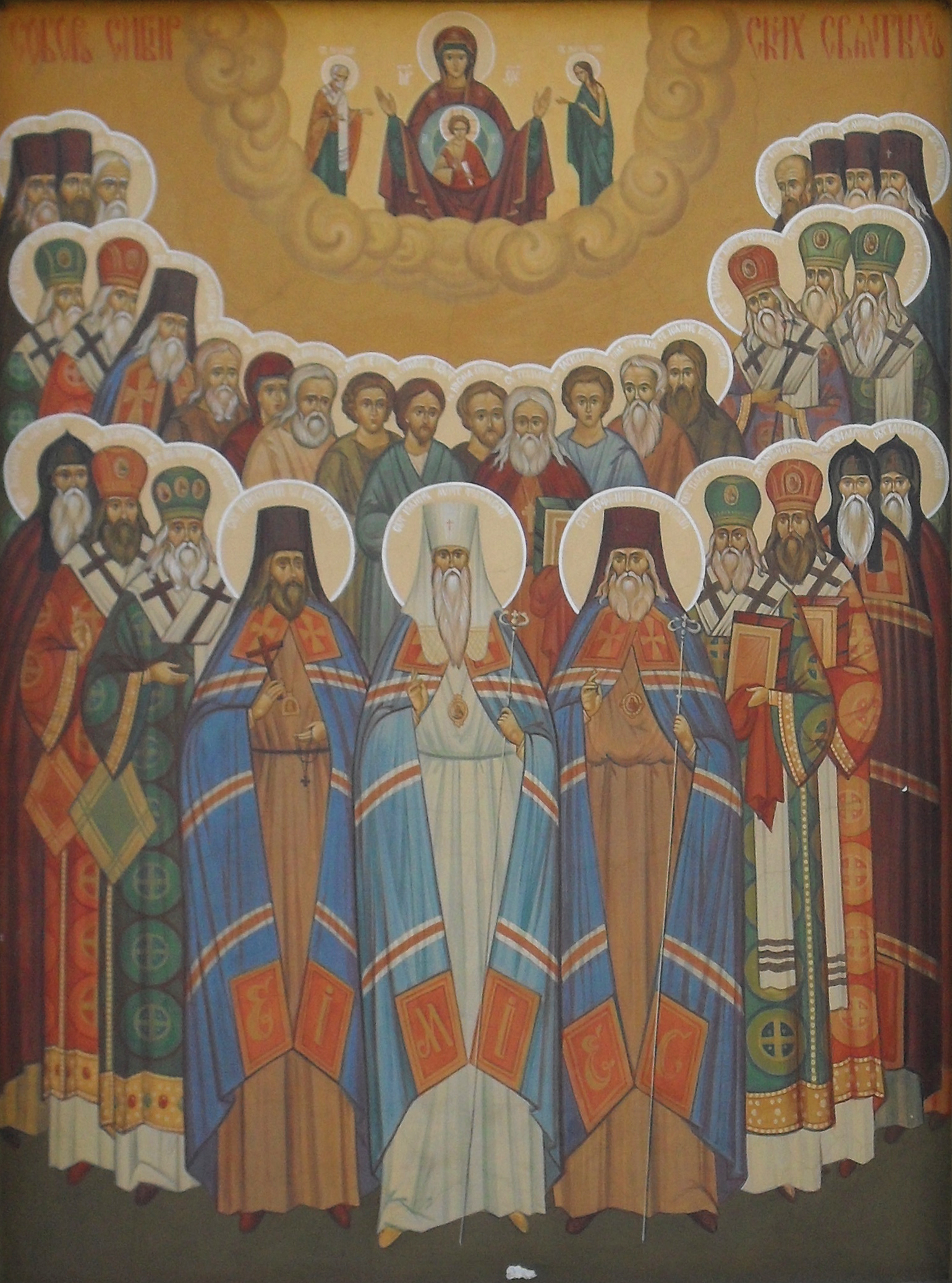
Synaxis of the Saints of Siberia.

== Sources ==
- June 10/23. Orthodox Calendar (PRAVOSLAVIE.RU).
- June 23 / June 10. HOLY TRINITY RUSSIAN ORTHODOX CHURCH (A parish of the Patriarchate of Moscow).
- June 10. OCA - The Lives of the Saints.
- The Autonomous Orthodox Metropolia of Western Europe and the Americas (ROCOR). St. Hilarion Calendar of Saints for the year of our Lord 2004. St. Hilarion Press (Austin, TX). p. 43.
- The Tenth Day of the Month of June. Orthodoxy in China.
- June 10. Latin Saints of the Orthodox Patriarchate of Rome.
- The Roman Martyrology. Transl. by the Archbishop of Baltimore. Last Edition, According to the Copy Printed at Rome in 1914. Revised Edition, with the Imprimatur of His Eminence Cardinal Gibbons. Baltimore: John Murphy Company, 1916. pp. 168–169.
- Rev. Richard Stanton. A Menology of England and Wales, or, Brief Memorials of the Ancient British and English Saints Arranged According to the Calendar, Together with the Martyrs of the 16th and 17th Centuries. London: Burns & Oates, 1892. pp. 264–265.

Greek Sources

- Great Synaxaristes: (in Greek) 10 ΙΟΥΝΙΟΥ. ΜΕΓΑΣ ΣΥΝΑΞΑΡΙΣΤΗΣ.
- (in Greek) Συναξαριστής. 10 Ιουνίου. ECCLESIA.GR. (H ΕΚΚΛΗΣΙΑ ΤΗΣ ΕΛΛΑΔΟΣ).
- (in Greek) 10/06/2017. Ορθόδοξος Συναξαριστής.

Russian Sources

- (in Russian) 23 июня (10 июня). Православная Энциклопедия под редакцией Патриарха Московского и всея Руси Кирилла (электронная версия). (Orthodox Encyclopedia - Pravenc.ru).
- (in Russian) 10 июня по старому стилю / 23 июня по новому стилю. Русская Православная Церковь - Православный церковный календарь на 2017 год.
- (in Russian) 10 июня (ст.ст.) 23 июня 2014 (нов. ст.). Русская Православная Церковь Отдел внешних церковных связей. (DECR).
