= World Art Nouveau Day =

Event dedicated to Art Nouveau

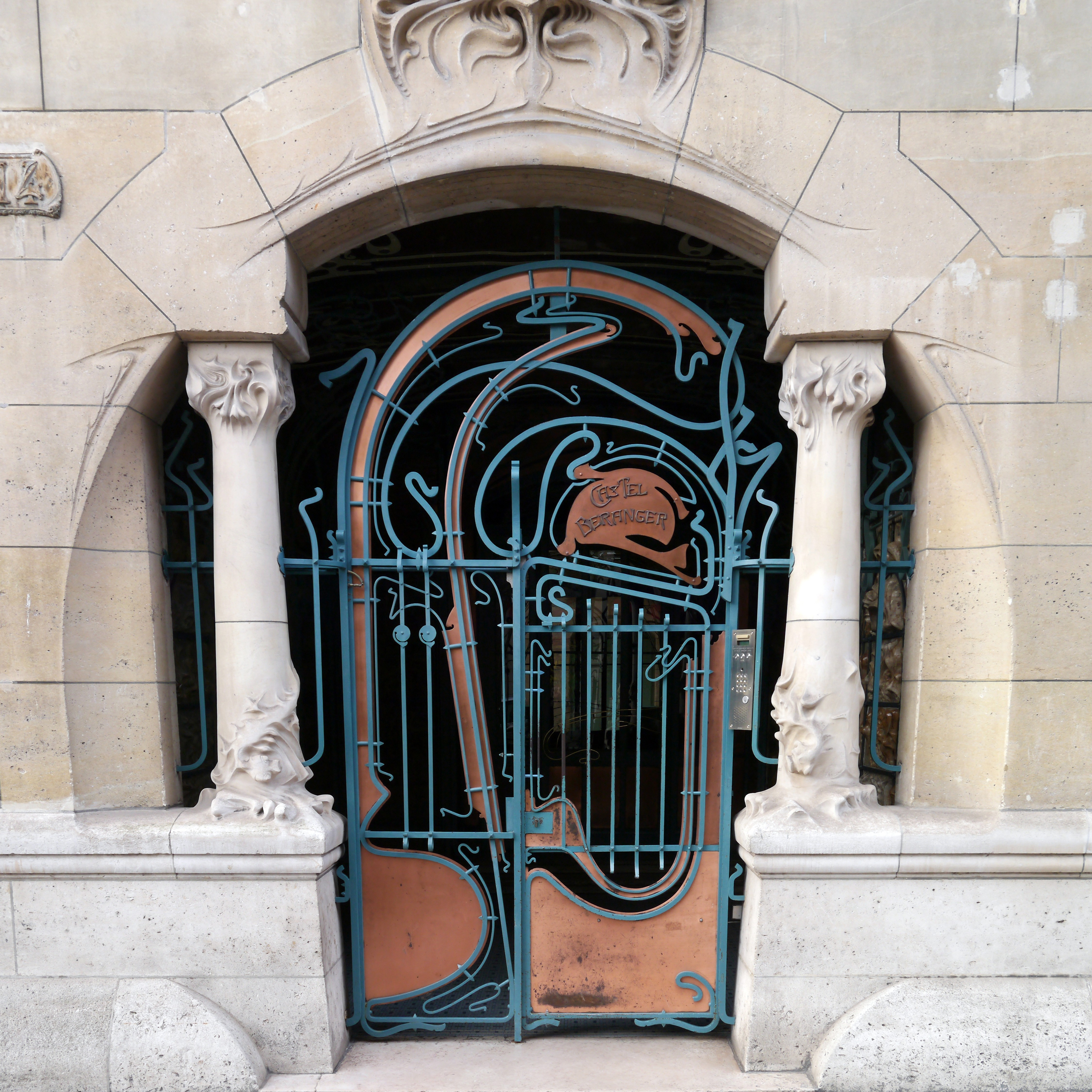
- The gateway of the Castel Béranger by Hector Guimard (1895–1898)
- Observed by: International
- Date: 10 June
- Frequency: Annual
- Related to: Art Nouveau

World Art Nouveau Day (WAND) is an event dedicated to Art Nouveau that is celebrated annually on 10 June. The first World Art Nouveau Day in 2013 was organized by The Museum of Applied Arts (Budapest) (IMM) in cooperation with Szecessziós Magazin (a Hungarian Magazine about Art Nouveau). The selected date – 10 June – is the anniversary of the death of two famous architects of the movement, Antoni Gaudí and Ödön Lechner. Activities like those organised on World Art Nouveau Day aim to create more awareness of Art Nouveau heritage among the public.

The two biggest organisations in Europe coordinating the World Art Nouveau Day activities are the Art Nouveau European Route in Barcelona, and the Réseau Art Nouveau Network (RANN) in Brussels. In 2019, the event was supported by European Heritage Alliance.

Each edition is dedicated to a special topic:

- 2018: My Favourite Art Nouveau Architect
- 2019: Staircases
- 2020: Stained-glass
- 2021: Animals
- 2022: Typography
- 2023: Materials
- 2024: Light
- 2025: Color
- 2026: Women of Art Nouveau
- 2027: The Modern Home

== Links ==
- World Art Nouveau Day on Facebook
