= Theodora and Didymus =

Early Christian saints

Saints Theodora and Didymus
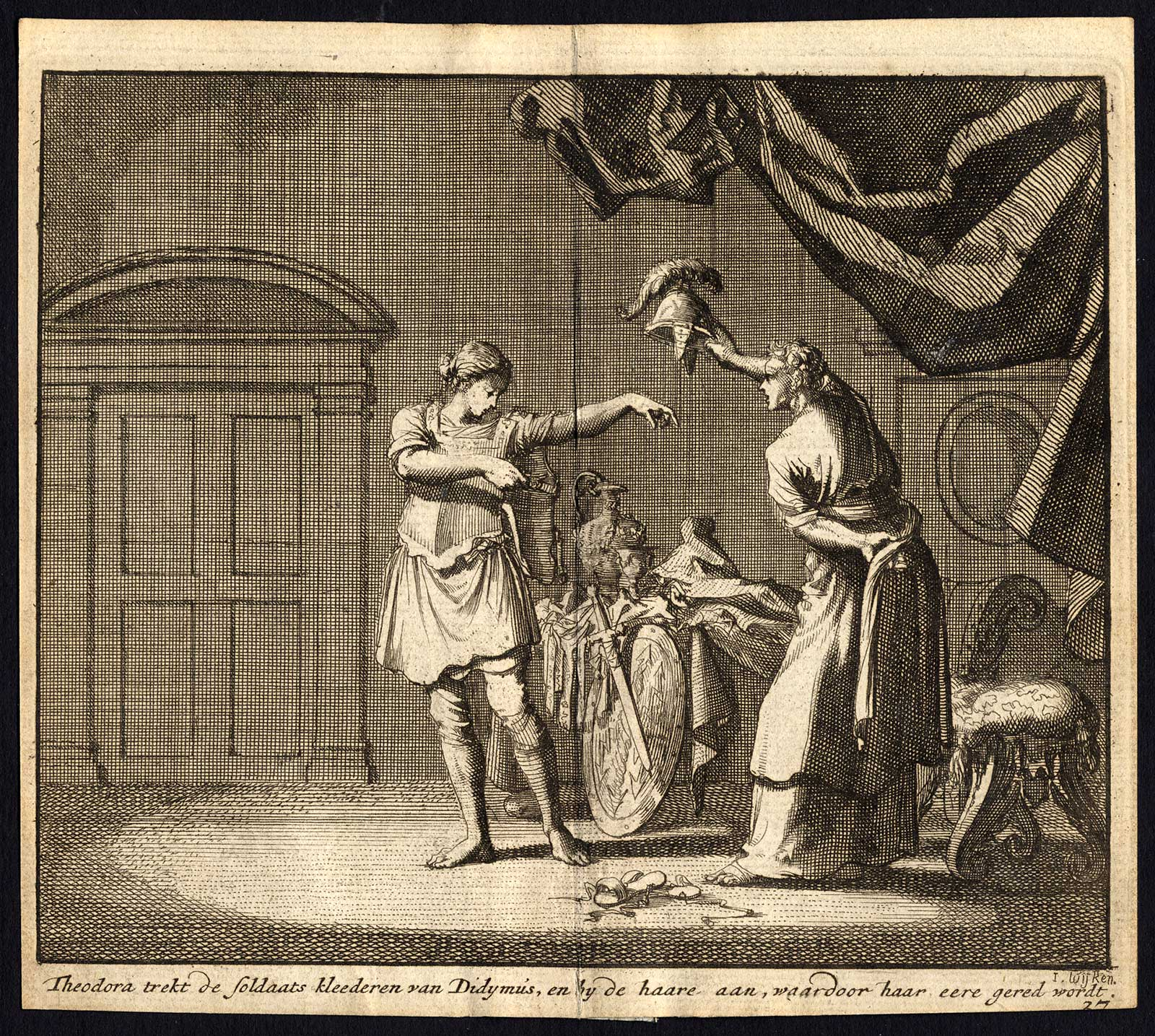

Martyrs
- Died: 304; Alexandria, Egypt
- Venerated in: Eastern Orthodox Church
- Canonized: Pre-Congregation
- Feast: 27 May (Eastern Orthodox Church); 5 April (Eastern Orthodox Church)

Saints Theodora and Didymus (died 304) are Christian saints whose legend is based on a 4th-century acta and the word of Saint Ambrose. The pair were martyred in the reigns of co-ruling Roman Emperors Diocletian and Maximianus. St. Theodora should not be confused with another St. Theodora of Alexandria commemorated on September 11.

== Legend ==
Theodora was a young noblewoman of Alexandria who had refused to offer sacrifice to the Roman gods. Standing trial before the prefect Eustratius, she bravely confessed herself a Christian. The prefect asked why she had not married, pointing out that she was of a noble family and beautiful and could have her choice of husbands. She replied that she had dedicated herself to God, and had resolved to remain a virgin for the name of Christ.

Eustratius had her imprisoned, giving her time to reconsider, and he threatened to have her taken to a brothel if she persisted in her disobedience. Three days later, Theodora was brought again to trial, but remained resolute.

Accordingly, Theodora was taken to a brothel. Dissolute youths began to argue which of them should be the first to have her. The Christian Didymus, dressed in soldier's garb, entered and chased the profligates out. Didymus exchanged clothes with her, and she escaped. When a man came to despoil the virgin, Didymus revealed himself. Didymus was taken prisoner and brought to the prefect, where he was condemned to death. Saint Ambrose says that Theodora could not allow her savior to die alone and that she joined Didymus before Proculus.

Didymus and, according to Ambrose, Theodora were beheaded. Didymus's body was burned. They are not included in the Roman Martyrology, the official list of saints of the Roman Catholic Church. The story of Theodora and Didymus is almost identical to that of Saints Antonia and Alexander.

The theme of the story might reflect the institution of religious prostitution, prevalent in the ancient Middle East, as remembered in a highly-disapproving Christian tradition.

=== Adaptations ===
Pierre Corneille wrote in 1645 a tragedy Theodore, virgin and martyr, based on this story, but he transferred it to Antioch. It was a signal failure, removed after only five performances. Corneille's play was the basis of Robert Boyle's version, The Martyrdom of Theodora, and of Didymus, privately composed and circulated in 1648-9 then published by Boyle in a revised edition in 1687. Boyle's version was read into the eighteenth century, with Samuel Johnson commenting that it was "the first 'attempt to employ the ornaments of romance in the decoration of religion.'"

The oratorio Theodora composed by George Frideric Handel in 1749 was based on the story of Theodora and Didymus.

Saints Antonina and Alexander
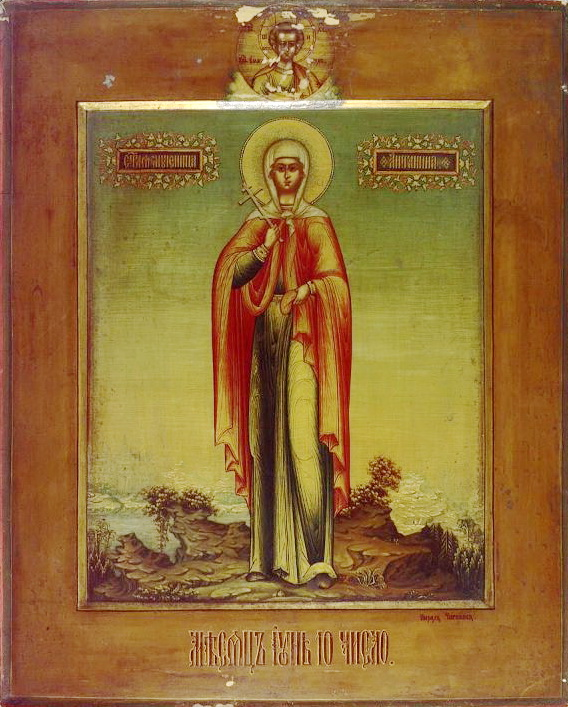

Virgin and Martyr, Martyr
- Born: 3rd century Asia Minor
- Died: May 3, 313; Asia Minor
- Venerated in: Eastern Orthodox Church; Roman Catholic Church
- Feast: June 10 (Orthodoxy); May 3 (Catholicism)

== Antonina and Alexander ==
Saints Antonina and Alexander at Crodamon were Christian martyrs of 313, and they are saints whose acta are legendary. The story of the two is nearly identical to that of Theodora and Didymus.

The legend of Antonina and Alexander has the former being forced to a brothel (the penalty for women who refused to wed), where a Christian soldier named Alexander came to her in the guise of a customer. Instead of deflowering her, he traded clothes with her, allowing Antonina to escape. Alexander was discovered very soon after, and both Antonina and Alexander were executed by being burned alive.

"Antonina" and "Alexander" may be mnemonic device names that made oral repetition of the tale easier, and so it is possible, if not likely, that they are invented names. Whether Theodora and Didymus were the originals or not, it is possible that these legends are shadows of an actual martyrdom that had been lost to the storytellers. The feast day of Antonina and Alexander in the Roman Catholic Church is May 3. In Orthodox Churs is June 10.
