= Réseau Art Nouveau Network =

Architectural heritage network

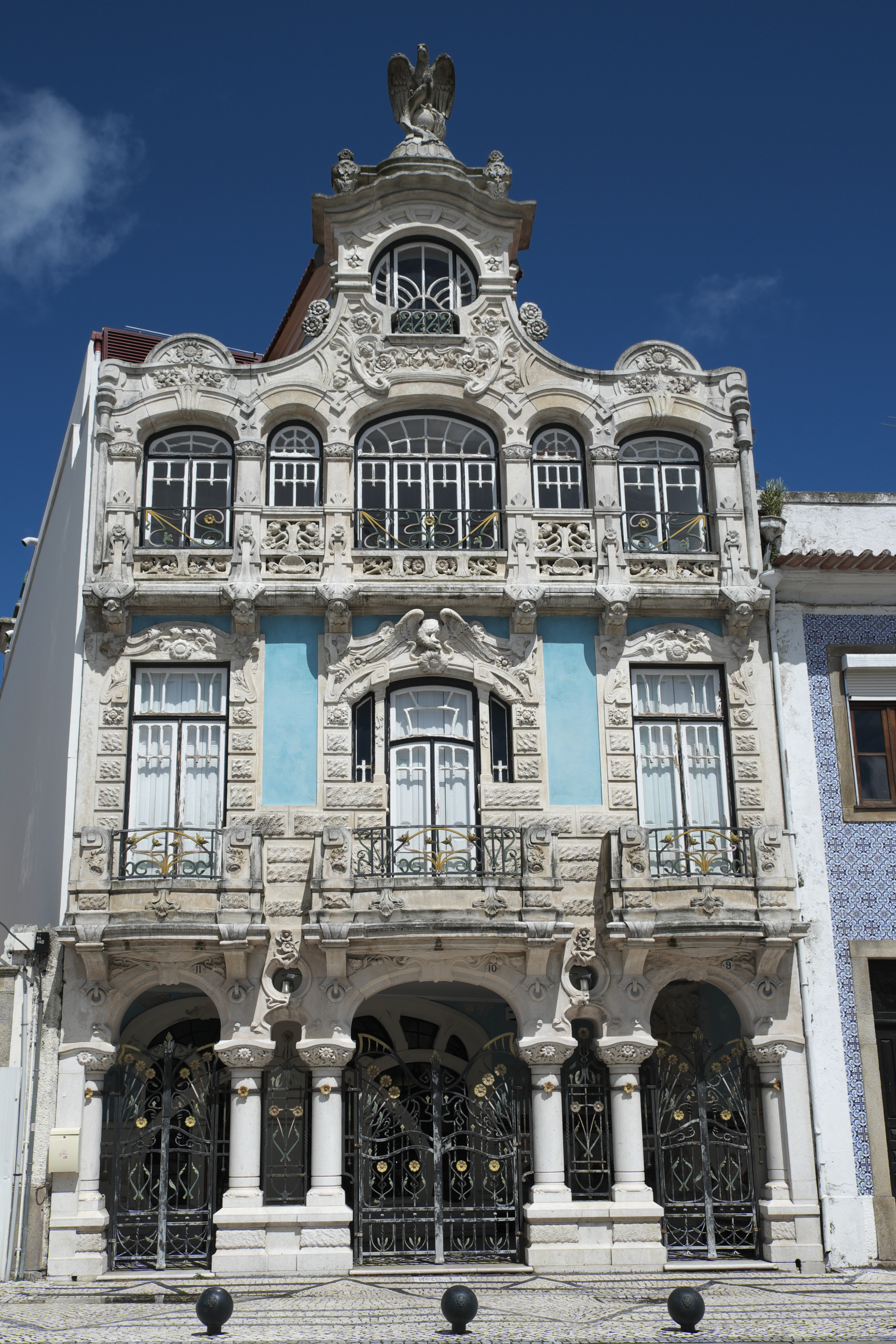
Aveiro Casa of Major Pessoa, in Aveiro, Portugal

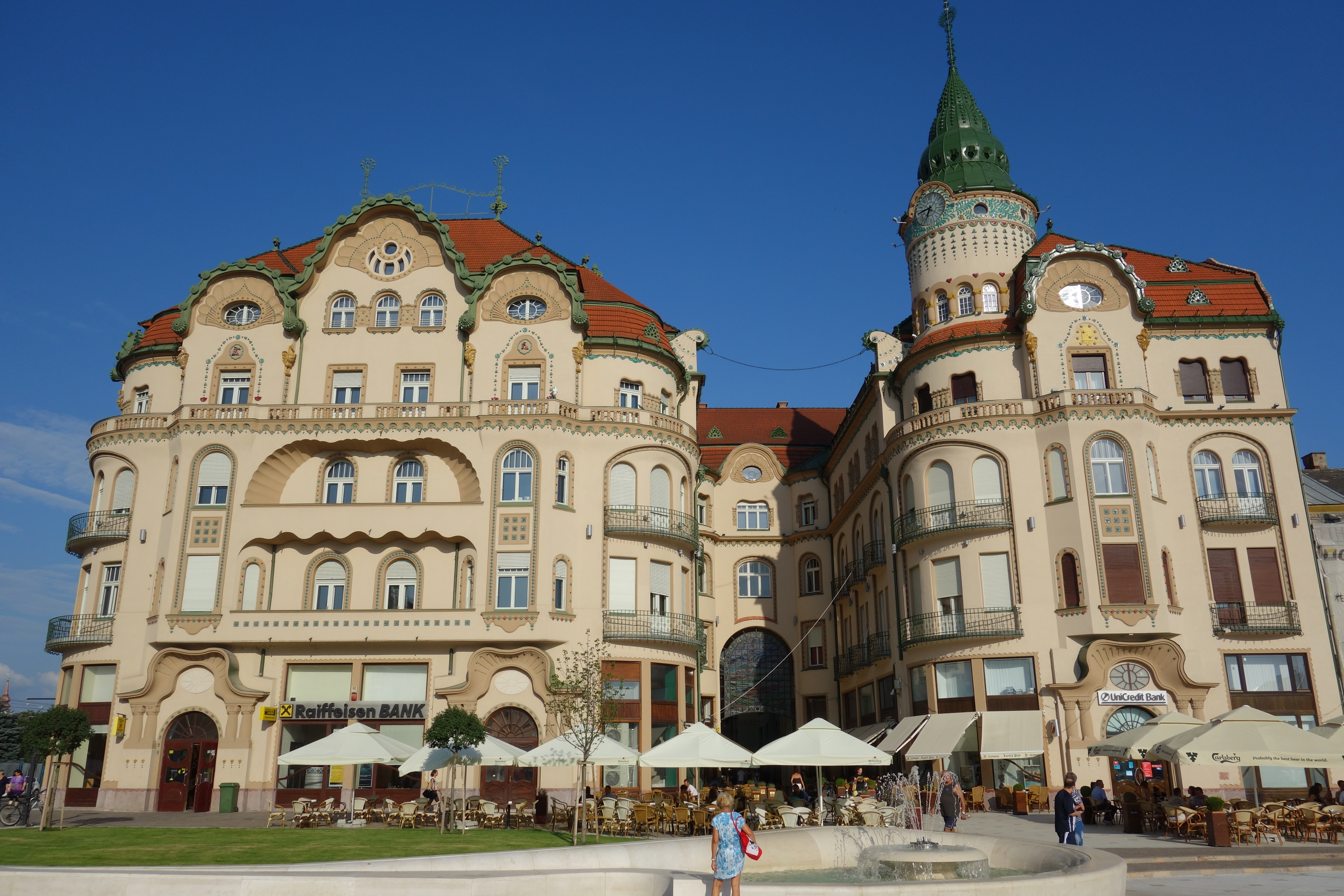
Black Eagle Palace, Oradea, Transylvania, Romania

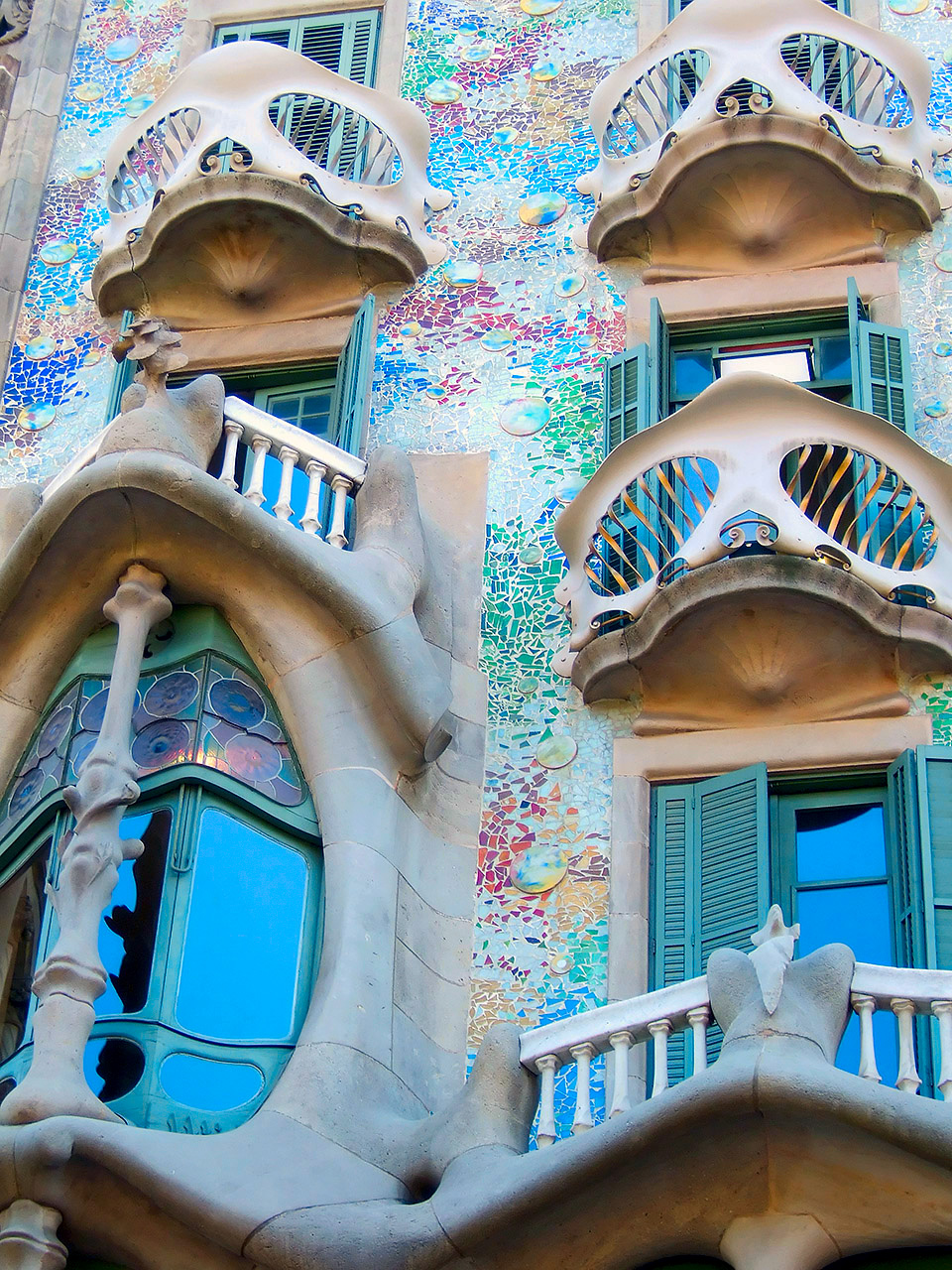
Facade of Antoni Gaudí's Casa Batlló in Barcelona

Réseau Art Nouveau Network (RANN) was established in 1999 by European cities with a rich Art Nouveau heritage. The Network is committed to preserving this heritage. Through the use a scientific approach, it aims to keep professionals informed and to make the general public aware of the cultural significance and European dimension of the Art Nouveau heritage.

== Description ==
The Réseau Art Nouveau Network was founded to share information about Art Nouveau heritage, and to protect works of art and architecture in this style, also known as the Ecole de Nancy, Glasgow Style, Jugendstil, Modernisme, Nieuwe Kunst, Stile Liberty, Sezessionstil, among other names. The movement at large was grounded in aesthetic ideals and a celebration of early modernism. In 1999, several European cities worked together to found the Network, including Barcelona, Glasgow, Vienna, Budapest, among others. By 2017, the network included institutions in over 20 cities or regional areas to join together the best research and practices "essential to the effective preservation and promotion of our Art Nouveau heritage" and to create public events and a series of projects.

Many Art Nouveau buildings throughout Europe are considered to be examples of the "remarkable architectural heritage" of various nations, and often these structures have historic monument protection designation. As a professional, international consortium of institutions and cities, RANN conducts research as well as conservation efforts to preserve and promote Art Nouveau. The organization is financed in part by the European Commission of the European Union, and is certified as an official Cultural Route of the Council of Europe.

By 2017, the network included Havana, Cuba in North America. As of April 2023, the network consists of 24 cities in Europe with shared goals to study, protect, and raise public awareness of Art Nouveau-style art, architecture and design.

In Gábor Sonkoly's book, Urban Heritage in Europe, he writes that "The importance and the European universal dimension of the shared Art Nouveau heritage of these cities and countries have also been specifically reflected during the European Year of Cultural Heritage in 2018. RANN has hosted the "World Art Nouveau Day" since 2017.

The headquarters of RANN are located in Brussels.

== Projects ==
=== Art Nouveau in Progress exhibition ===
The work of RANN has contributed to the public's knowledge of the architectural works of Antoni Gaudí, Charles Rennie Mackintosh and Hector Guimard. In 2004, they organized a traveling exhibition in Europe, Art Nouveau in Progress, that included the work of numerous architects, designers and artists who worked in the classic organic styles of Art Nouveau and also included later works incorporating less decorative works that were more influenced by industrial design. The exhibition was organized into three curatorial times: "vision, disappearance, and continuity and regeneration, or more accurately, hitherto unseen designs; no-longer-to-be-seen buildings; and projects seeking new uses." This curatorial strategy informed the public on how the styles were approached in each city that was represented. The show received both praise and criticism, for example, Paris and Prague were not included although they both contain many works of Art Nouveau; a significant absence. It was praised for including little known works in Budapest, including the Palace of the Pachyderms at the Budapest Zoo. Each city that presented the traveling exhibition contributed local elements including art-nouveau textiles. The exhibition originated in Brussels in 2003 and later travelled to 11 other European cities, commencing in 2006.

=== The Nature of Art Nouveau exhibition ===
The traveling exhibition, The Nature of Art Nouveau, explored the correlation between Art Nouveau and ecology which traveled to 14 member cities. Among these venues were the Palacio del Secundo Cabo in La Habana, Cuba, and the Darvas La Roche House in Oradea, Romania. The exhibition was part of a larger project on Art Nouveau and ecology that addressed the "centrality of nature" within the movement. In addition to design characteristics the project researched the origin of building materials used, and the impact of weather on Art Nouveau structures.

=== Art Nouveau World Day annual event ===
RANN organizes the Art Nouveau World Day annually. Various public events are organized including photography competitions.

== Member countries ==
Several institutions from the following cities and regions are members, including the following:

- Austria: Vienna
- Belgium: Brussels, Liege, Mons, St. Gilles
- Cuba: La Habana
- Germany: Bad Nauheim, Darmstadt, Wiesbaden
- France: Nancy, Paris
- Hungary: Budapest, Szeged
- Italy: Lombardy, Palermo, Turin, Viareggio
- Latvia: Riga
- Norway: Ålesund
- Portugal: Aveiro
- Romania: Oradea
- Slovenia: Ljubljana
- Spain: Alcoy, Barcelona, Melilla, Reus, Terrassa
- Switzerland: La Chaux-de-Fonds
- Ukraine: Lviv
- United Kingdom: Glasgow
- Serbia: Subotica

=== Candidate cities ===
- Romania: Timișoara
