= Saint Pantaleon, Cologne =

Romanesque Church in Cologne

Coordinates: 50°55′43″N 6°56′53″E

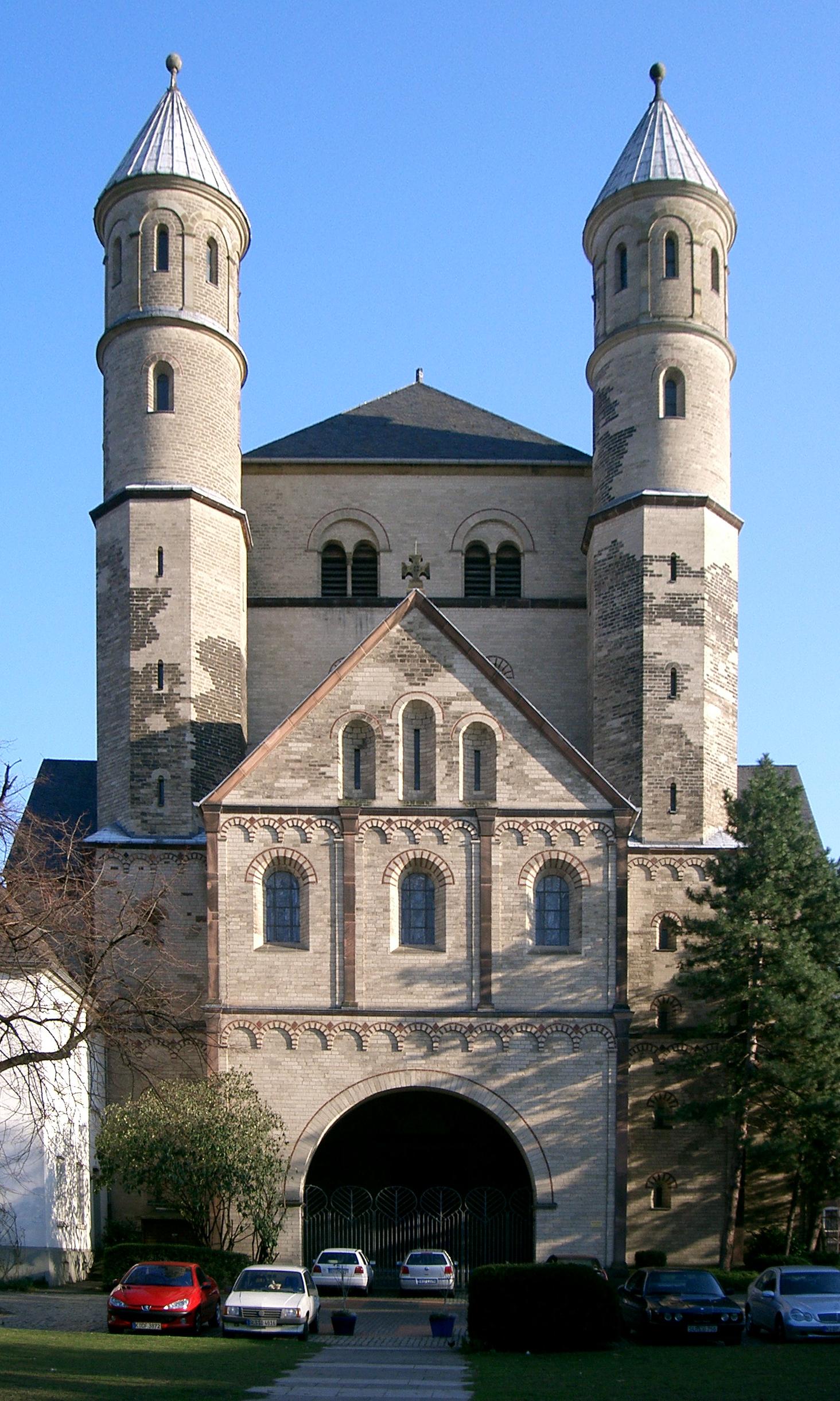
Church of St. Pantaleon, front facade

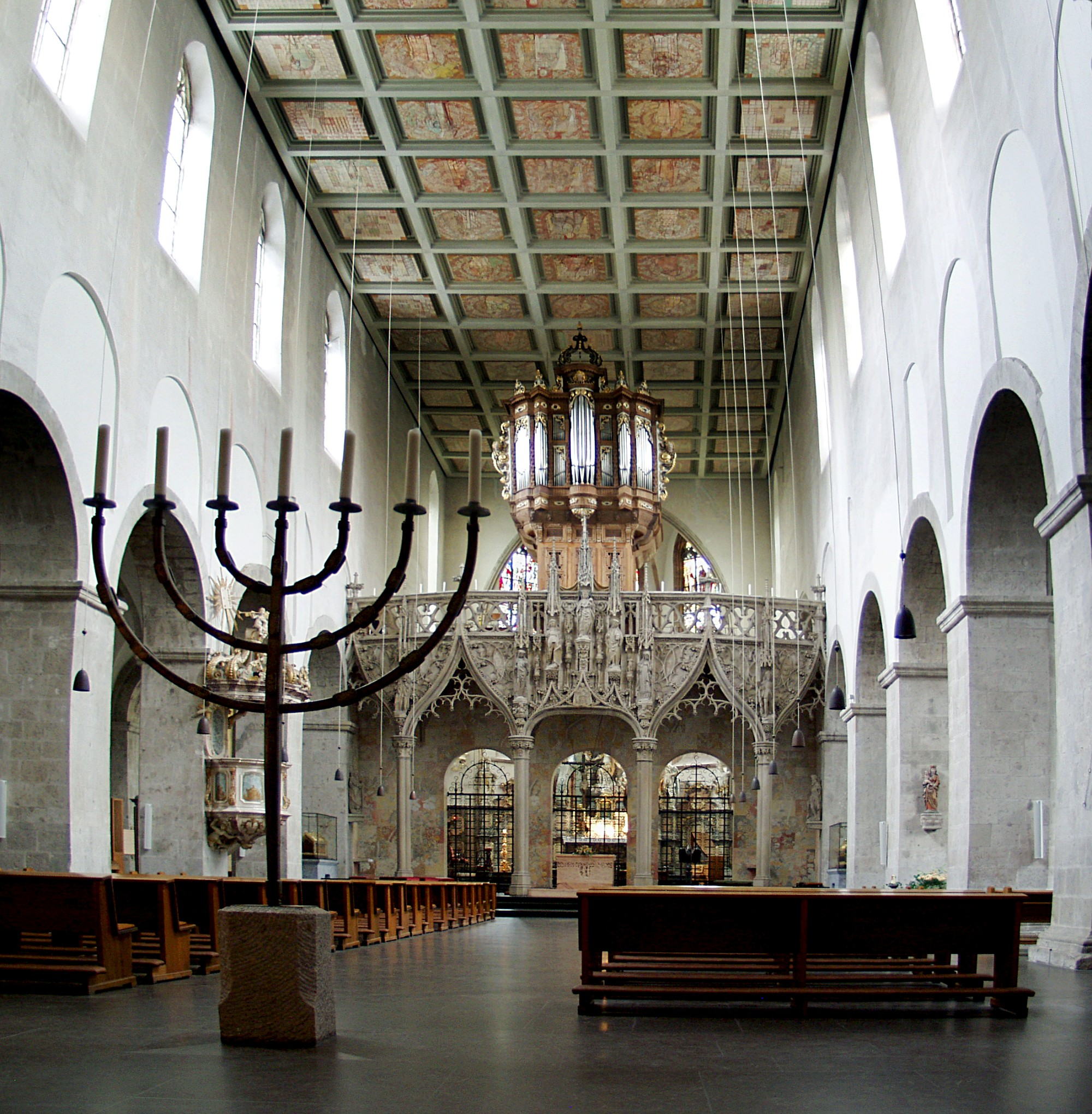
Church of St. Pantaleon, interior

The Church of Saint Pantaleon (German: Sankt Pantaleon [ˌzaŋkt panˈtaːleɔn]; Kölsch: Zint Pantalejon [ˌtsɪ̂nt panˈtálɪjɔn]) is an early Romanesque church in Cologne, Germany. The church dates back to the 10th century and is one of the twelve Romanesque churches of Cologne. The former monastery church is consecrated to Saint Pantaleon and the Saints Cosmas and Damian and is the oldest church of the cult of Saint Pantaleon west of Byzantium. The Holy Roman Empress Theophanu and the archbishop Bruno the Great are buried in the church, which also contains shrines of saints Alban, the first Christian martyr of Britain, and Maurinus of Cologne. Pope Benedict XVI visited the church in 2005.

== History ==
A Roman villa originally occupied the hill, just outside Roman Cologne, on which the church stands. Remains of this villa are still visible in the church crypt. The villa was replaced with a church around 870 and in 955, Archbishop Bruno the Great (brother of Emperor Otto the Great) added a Benedictine abbey. Here, Bruno was buried after his death. In 966, work was begun on a new church to go with the monastery. The church was consecrated in 980.

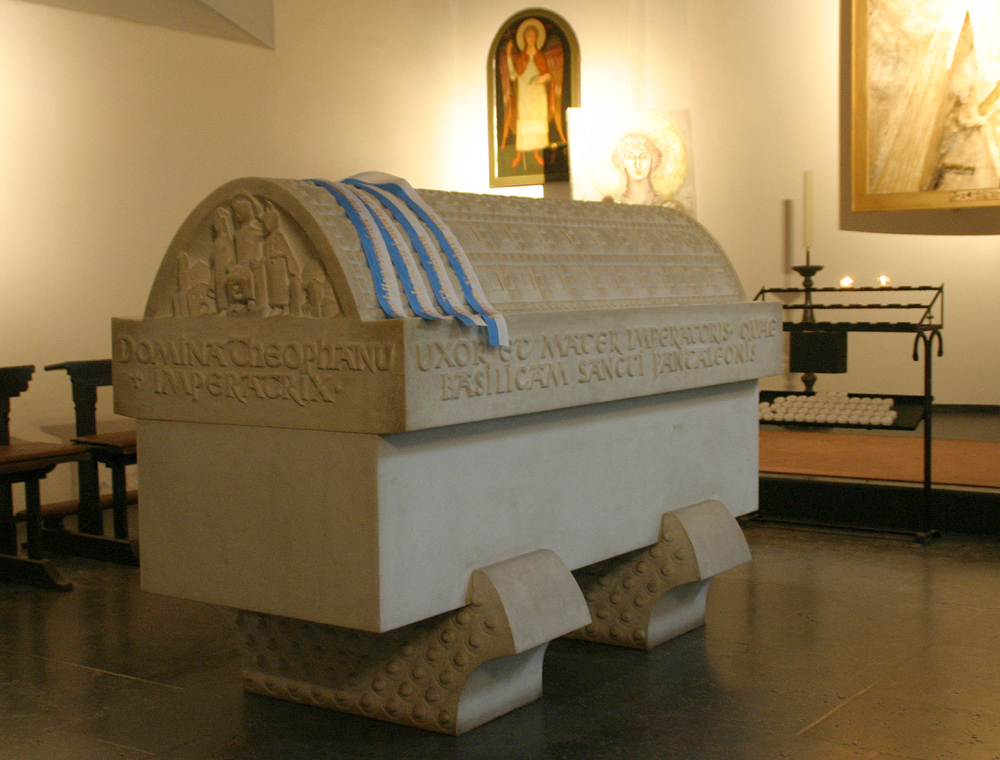
Sarcophagus of Holy Roman Empress Theophanu

Holy Roman Empress Theophanu, a Byzantine princess who was married to Emperor Otto II in 972, ordered the construction of the current facade and was also buried in the church at her own request.

From 1618 onwards, the building was remodeled in several phases to a Baroque style church. The monastery was dissolved after Cologne was occupied by French revolutionary forces in 1794. The church then served as a horse stable, and, after Cologne became Prussian in 1815, as a Protestant garrison church. A semaphore telegraph was placed on the roof of the church to enable rapid communication between Cologne and the Prussian capital of Berlin.

St. Pantaleon played an important role in the earliest stage of German Old Catholicism. Seeing the persecution of Old Catholics by Roman Catholics, the government authorized Old Catholics to celebrate mass there in February 1872. Though the church previously served as a horse stable and a Protestant garrison church, Roman Catholic Bishop Franz Adolf Namszanowski was enraged that the space was now "polluted," leading the Bavarian government to strip him of his office as apostolic vicar of the Bavarian army.

In 1890–1892 the building underwent restoration and in 1922 the church, through an exchange with the Cologne Charterhouse, again became Catholic. During the Second World War, the roof, parts of the outer walls and a large part of the interior were destroyed, but after the war the church was restored. During this restoration, in 1955–1962, an archeological survey was conducted. Around 1956–1957, new church bells were placed, and in 1963 a new organ was installed.

The coffered ceiling in the nave, depicting the Tree of Jesse and portraits of various saints, was designed and constructed by artist Dieter Hartmann and was made possible by support of the booster club for the Romanesque churches of Cologne. The ceiling in the flanking westwork was done by artist Gerhard Kadow in 1966, and depicts the Heavenly Jerusalem.

Pope Benedict XVI visited the church on 19 August 2005, during World Youth Day 2005, and addressed a group of seminarians. On 10 August 2006, Cardinal Joachim Meisner blessed a new chapel in the church dedicated to Saint Josemaría Escrivá, founder of Opus Dei.

== Shrines ==
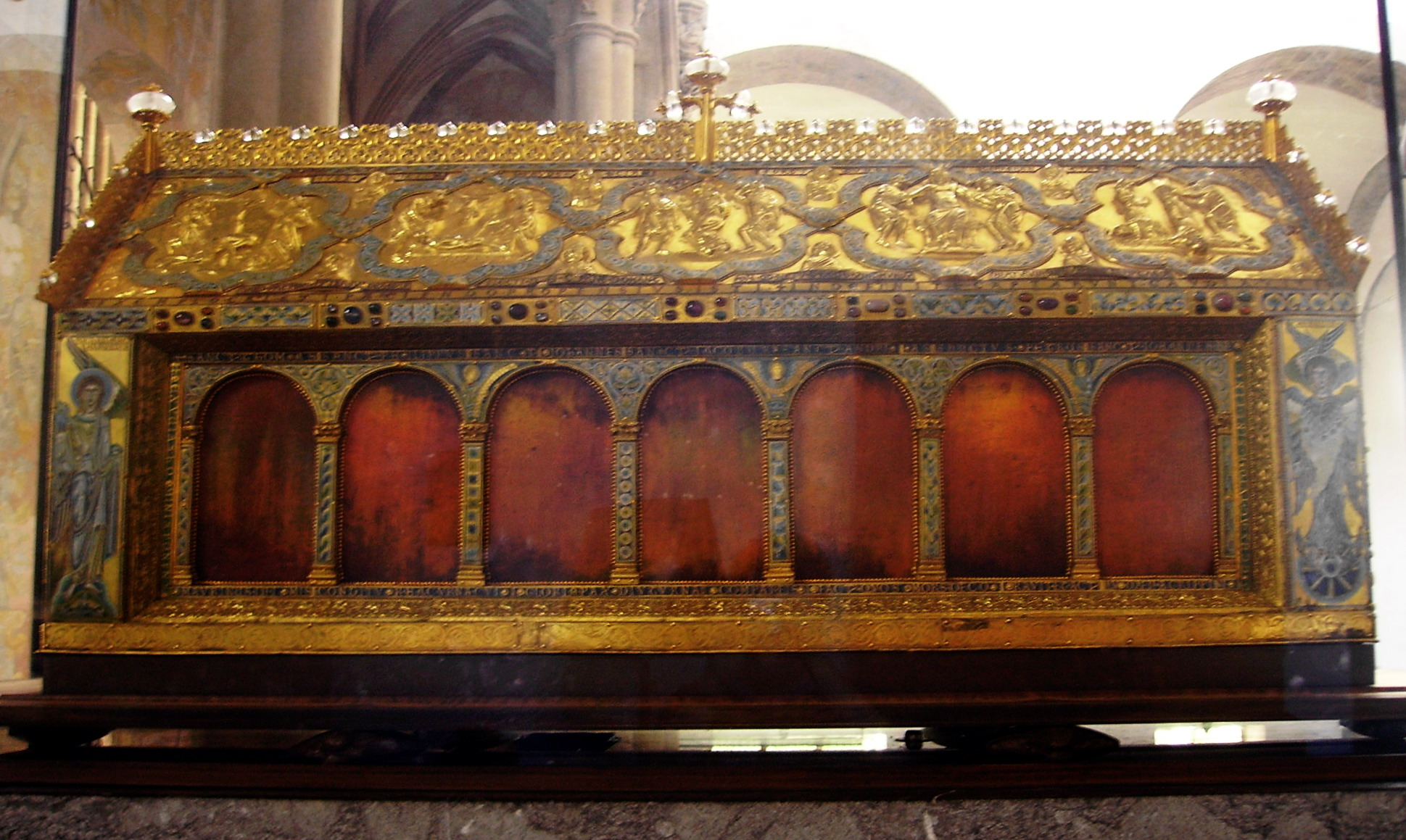
Shrine to Maurinus of Cologne

Since the 10th century, the church holds a shrine to Saint Alban. The remains of Saint Alban probably ended up in the church after the Dissolution of the Monasteries by King Henry VIII of England in the 16th century. In 2002, a collar bone, one of the relics in the shrine, was moved to St Albans Cathedral in St Albans, England, and placed in the shrine to Saint Alban there.

The church also contains a 12th-century shrine to Maurinus of Cologne said to contain the remains of this saint.

A more modern shrine, completed in 2006, stands in the northern aisle. It is dedicated to Josemaría Escrivá, the founder of the Opus Dei movement. The shrine was officially consecrated in 2006 by Cardinal Joachim Meisner of Cologne.

== Glass windows ==
Left and central choir windows

Three stained-glass windows in the choir were created by the glass painter Heinrich Braun the Younger in 1622. The central one depicts the crucifixion of Jesus with three angels, Mary, John the Apostle and Mary Magdalene. The left one depicts the Saints Maurice, Pantaleon and Quirinus of Neuss.

== See also ==
- Twelve Romanesque churches of Cologne
- Romanesque architecture
- List of regional characteristics of Romanesque churches
