= Maurinus of Cologne =

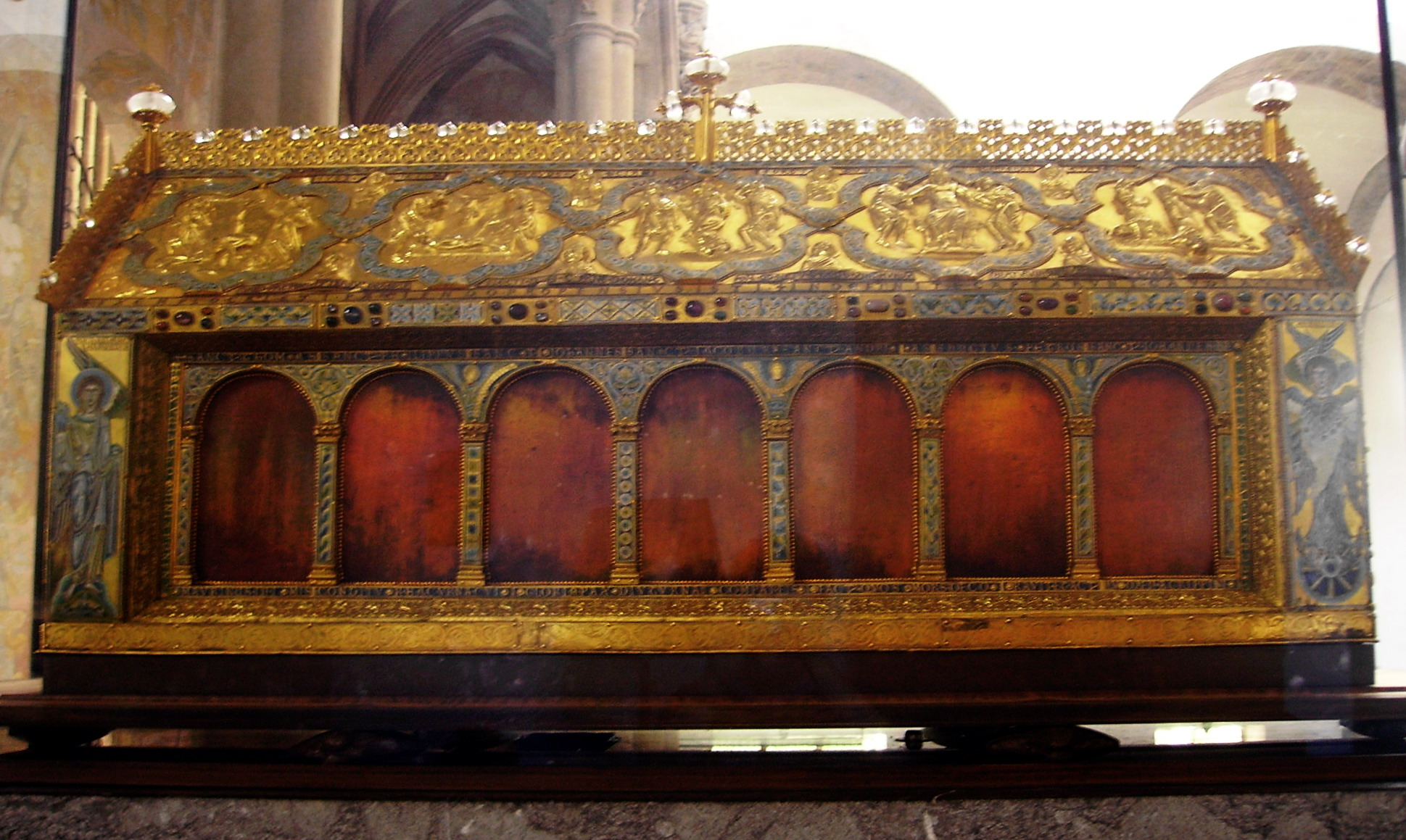
Maurinus' shrine in Saint Pantaleon's Church, Cologne

Maurinus of Cologne was a 9th-century German abbot who is said to have died as a martyr. He is recognised as a saint by the Roman-Catholic Church and Eastern Orthodox Church. His 12th-century shrine rests in Saint Pantaleon's Church, Cologne. Saint Maurinus' Church, Lützenkirchen is dedicated to him. His saint's day is 10 June.

A tomb containing his bones was found together with the remains of Saint Pantaleon and Bruno the Great when construction of Saint Pantaleon's Church began in 966 on the spot of an earlier Benedictine monastery. In c. 1170–1180, a richly decorated shrine was built to house the relics, which remains in the church to this date. His relics were translated to Church of Saint Mary, Our Lady of Peace in the Schnurgasse in Cologne in 1820.

Little is known about his life. According to the inscription on his original tomb, he died a martyr's death in the porch of the monastery church on 10 June. The body in the tomb bore traces of torture and a violent death. His martyrdom was possibly related to the Viking raids of 881/882.
