= John of Tobolsk =

Russian ascetic and metropolitan (1651–1715)

Saint John of Tobolsk
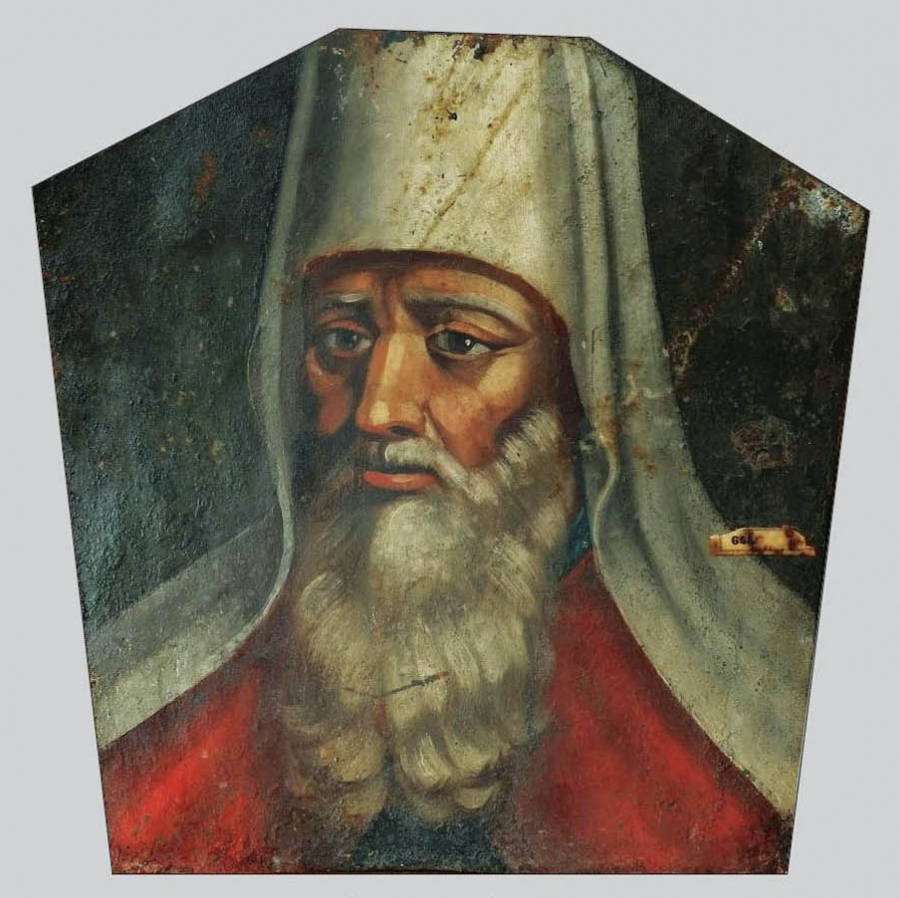

Metropolitan of Tobolsk
- Born: 1651; Nizhyn, Cossack Hetmanate
- Died: 10 June 1715; Tobolsk, Tsardom of Russia
- Venerated in: Eastern Orthodox Church
- Canonized: 1916 by Russian Orthodox Church
- Feast: 23 June [10 June O.S.]
- Patronage: Siberia

John of Tobolsk (Russian: Иоанн Тобольский; 1651–1715), born Ioann Maksimovich Vasilkovskiy (Russian: Иоанн Максимович Васильковский; Ukrainian: Іван Максимович Васильківський, romanized: Ivan Maksymovych Vasylkivskyi) was a teacher, writer and clergyman of Ukrainian Cossack origin, who served as the Russian Orthodox archbishop of Chernigov and Novgorod-Seversk, and later as the metropolitan of Tobolsk and all Siberia.

== Life ==
Born to a noble Cossack family in Nieżyn, then de-jure part of the Czernihow Voivodeship of the Polish–Lithuanian Commonwealth, but de-facto administrated by the eponymous regiment of the Cossack Hetmanate, he was the only one of the seven sons of Maksym Wasylkowski Maksymowicz to enter the service of the Eastern Orthodox Church. After graduating from Kiev Academy in 1673, Maksimovich initially stayed at the establishment, as a teacher of poetics, rhetorics and Latin language. In 1676 he was tonsured as a monk of the Kiev Pechersk Lavra, in which he was appointed manager by 1678. Soon thereafter Maksimovich was transferred to Chernigov, where he taught Latin at the local school. As Bishop Theodore of Uglich wanted someone to succeed him of presiding over Chernigov, he appointed John as Archimandrite of the Eletsky Monastery in 1695. Bishop Theodore of Uglich reposed in 1696 and John became Archbishop of Chernigov.

During his pastorate in Chernigov, John distinguished himself by operating a spiritual academy, writing prose and poetry inspired by faith, and inspiring faith in others. His most famous work is "Iliotropion" (Russian: Илиотропион, meaning "Sunflower"), which he translated and adapted into Slavonic and Russian from the original Latin of the German Jesuit priest Jeremias Drexel. In the early 21st century, it remains the standard work on theodicy among the Eastern Orthodox. Several of Maksimovich's works and translations were influenced by the contemporary European trends of Enlightenment and Protestantism.

In 1711, he was made Metropolitan of the Siberian city of Tobolsk on the order of Tsar Peter I, taking the place of Metropolitan Philotheos who wished to carry out missionary work among pagan tribes in remote places. After his arrival in Tobolsk Maksimovich engaged in educational and missionary activities among the local non-Christian peoples of Siberia. During his tenure the metropolitan introduced his native church customs in the region, among others inviting portrait and icon painters from Ukraine to decorate churches and monasteries in Tobolsk and Tyumen. Already during his life Maksimovich was perceived by locals as a saint, and after his death numerous wonders were said to have taken place on his grave.

John died peacefully in 1715, inside his quarters while at prayer. John was honored as a saint in Siberia by longstanding local veneration. His canonization was supported by Rasputin. In 1916 the Russian Orthodox Church officially glorified (canonized) him for veneration throughout the church. His feast day is June 10, the anniversary of his death.

John of Tobolsk is the namesake of John of Shanghai and San Francisco, whom is his distant relative.
