= October 4 (Eastern Orthodox liturgics) =

Day in the Eastern Orthodox liturgical calendar

Eastern Orthodox liturgical calendar
October 3	October 4	October 5
October 4 O.S. ≍ October 17 N.S. October 4 N.S ≍ September 21 O.S.

An Eastern Orthodox cross

October 4 in Eastern Orthodox liturgical calendars is a feast day and a day of commemoration of saints and martyrs. Although some Orthodox churches use the Revised Julian Calendar and others use the traditional Julian calendar, the fixed commemorations for their respective October 4 are broadly the same, no matter which calendar is used. (Note: Despite the dates being the same, the days to which they refer typically differ by 13 days. The notation Old Style or O.S. is sometimes used to indicate a date in the traditional Julian Calendar (the "Old Calendar"). The notation New Style or N.S. indicates a date in the Revised Julian calendar (the "New Calendar").)

== Saints ==
- Hieromartyr Hierotheus of Athens, first Bishop of Athens (1st century) (Note: Name days celebrated today include: Ierotheos (Ἱερόθεος); Ierothea (Ἱεροθέα).)
- Venerable Theodore the Wonderworker, Bishop of Tamassos, Cyprus (2nd century)
- Martyrs Gaius, Faustus, Eusebius, and Chaeremon, Deacons, of Alexandria (3rd century) (Note: "At Alexandria, the holy priests and deacons Caius, Faustus, Eusebius, Chaeremon, Lucius, and their companions. Some of them were martyred in the persecution of Valerian; others, for serving the martyrs, received the reward of martyrs.") (see also: October 3)
- Martyrs Domnina and her daughters Berenice (Bernice) and Prosdoce, of Syria (302) (Note: "Domnina and her two daughters, virgins, Berenice or Verinna and Prosdoce, in the persecution of Diocletian fled from home, but were pursued; and being taken by soldiers, to escape from their brutality flung themselves into a river and were drowned.")
- Martyr Adauctus (c. 312) and his daughter St. Callisthene (c. 318), of Ephesus. (Note: "Adauctus, a citizen of Ephesus, suffered martyrdom in Mesopotamia, in the persecution of Maximin. His daughter Callisthene cut her hair short, disguised herself as a young man, and concealed herself in Nicomedia. After eight years she went to Thrace, and lodged with a woman who had a daughter with delicate eyes. Callisthene, by careful attention, healed the girl, and the mother desired to marry the two, that they might settle in her house and be the comfort of her old age. Callisthene was then obliged to tell her story. She went next to Constantia, the wife of Licinius, and told her her case, and the empress procured for her the restoration of her father's property which had been confiscated. Callisthene recovered the body of her father, brought it to Ephesus, and built a church over it.")
- Venerable Paul the Simple (c. 339) and Venerable Ammon (350), of Egypt, disciples of St. Anthony the Great.
- Hieromartyr Peter of Capitolia, Bishop of Bostra in Arabia (715)
- Venerable John (Lampadistes) of Cyprus (10th century)
- Saint Vladimir Yaroslavich, prince of Novgorod (1052), and his mother St. Anna of Novgorod (Ingegerd Olofsdotter of Sweden) (1050)

== Pre-Schism Western saints ==
- Saint Petronius of Bologna, Bishop of Bologna (c. 450) (Note: Probably the son of a prefect in France, he visited the monks in Palestine and prayed at the holy places. He became Bishop of Bologna in Italy and built the monastery of St Stephen there, reproducing the general lines of the buildings of the holy places in Jerusalem.) (Note: "At Bologna, St. Petronius, bishop and confessor, celebrated for learning, miracles and sanctity.")
- Saint Quintius of Tours (Quentin), a citizen of Tours, martyred at L'Indrois near Montrésor (6th century) (Note: "Quintin of Tours, not to be confounded with his more famous namesake, was a native of Meaux, who came to Tours when Gunthram was King of Paris. The wife of his master fell desperately in love with him, and because he indignantly rejected her overtures she compassed his murder, which took place at L'Indrois, near Montresor.") (Note: A citizen of Tours in France, he worked at the court of the Frankish king. The reigning queen tried to seduce him and had him assassinated at L'Indrois near Montresor.)
- Saint Aurea, a Syrian who moved to France and became Abbess of St Martial in Paris, where she remained for thirty-three years (666)

== Post-Schism Orthodox saints ==
- Saints Helladius and Onesimus of the Near Caves in Kiev (12th-13th centuries)
- Saint Ammon, recluse, of the Far Caves in Kiev (13th century)
- Saint Stephen Stiljanovic, despot of Srem, Serbia (1540), and his wife St. Elena (Elizabeth in monasticism) (c. 1543)
- Saints Jonah and Nectarius, monks, of Kazan (16th century)
- Hieromartyr Evdemoz I, Catholicos of Georgia (1642)
- Saint Peter (Michurin) of Kuznetsk, Siberia (1820)
- Saint Nikodim Milaš of Dalmatia (1915) (Note: St. Nikodim (Milaš) of Dalmatia (1845-1915) was Bishop of Dalmatia and Istria, a renowned theologian, and canonical scholar who authored over 180 works including the influential Orthodox Church Law, and served as rector of the Belgrade Seminary.)

=== New Martyrs and Confessors ===
- New Hieromartyr Demetrius Voznesensky, Priest (1918)
- New Hieromartyrs Nicholas Vereschagin, Michael Tverdovsky, Jacob Bobirev and Tikhon Archangelsky, Priests (1937)
- New Hieromartyr Basil (Tsvetkov), Archimandrite, of Stary Kelets, Ryazan (1937)
- Saint Khionia Archangelsky, Confessor (1945)
- New Hiero-confessor Barsanuphius (Yurchenko) of Kherson (1954)
- New Hiero-confessor Dumitru Stăniloae, Priest, theology professor in Sibiu and Bucharest (1993)

== Other commemorations ==
- Uncovering of the relics (1595) of St. Gurias (1563), first Archbishop of Kazan, and St. Barsanuphius, Bishop of Tver (1576)
- Synaxis of the Saints of Kazan (1984) (Note: See: (in Russian) Собор Казанских святых. Википедии. (Russian Wikipedia).)
- Synaxis of the Icon of the Theotokos "Kitrinopetritissa" ("Yellow-stone") in Australia.

== Icon gallery ==
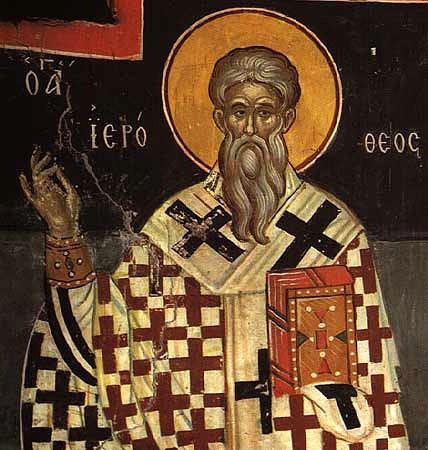
Hieromartyr Hierotheus of Athens, first Bishop of Athens.

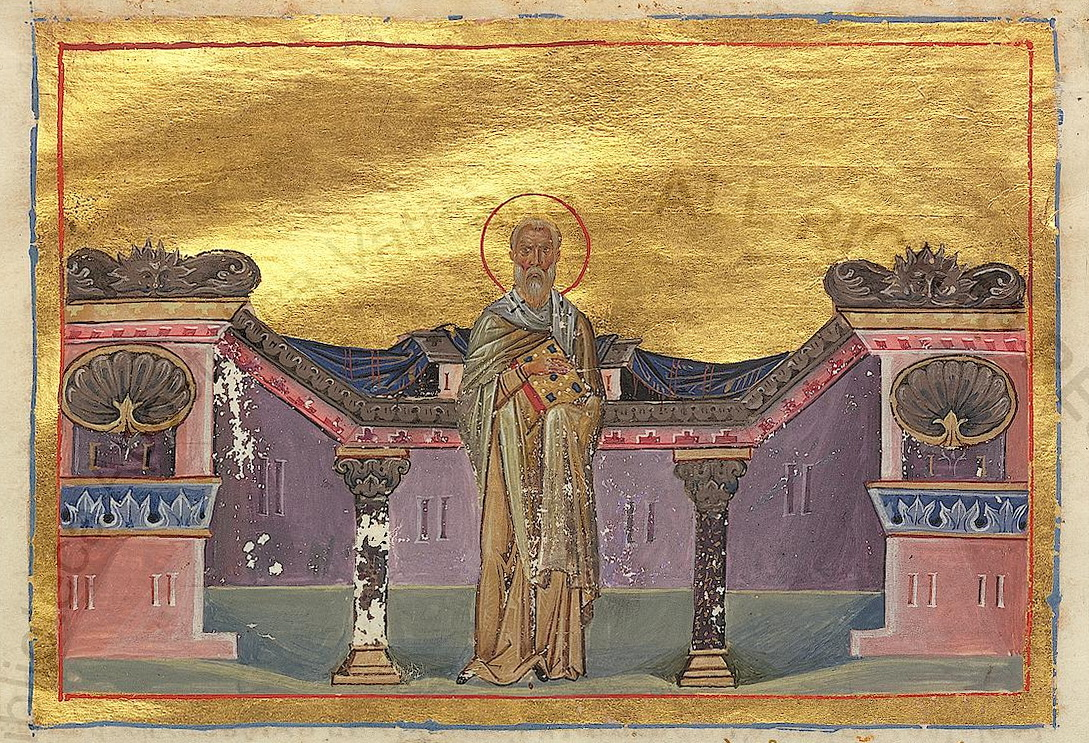
Hieromartyr Hierotheus of Athens, first Bishop of Athens.
(Menologion of Basil II, 10th century).

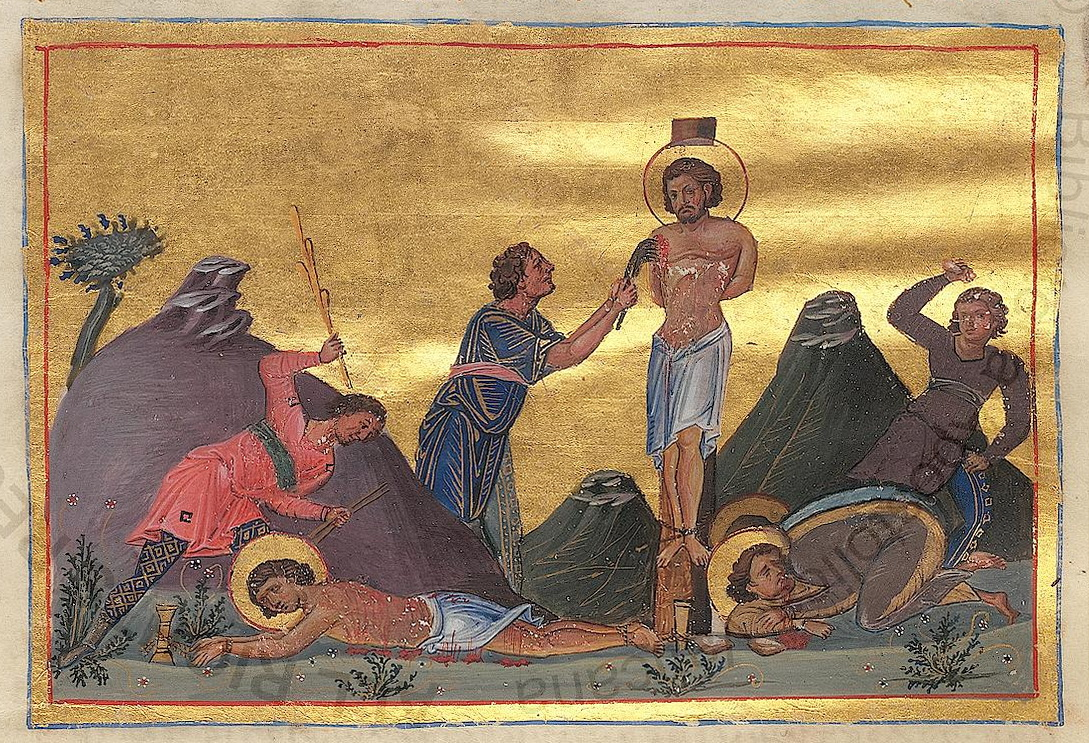
Martyrs Gaius, Faustus, Eusebius and Chaeremon, Deacons of Alexandria.
(Menologion of Basil II, 10th century).

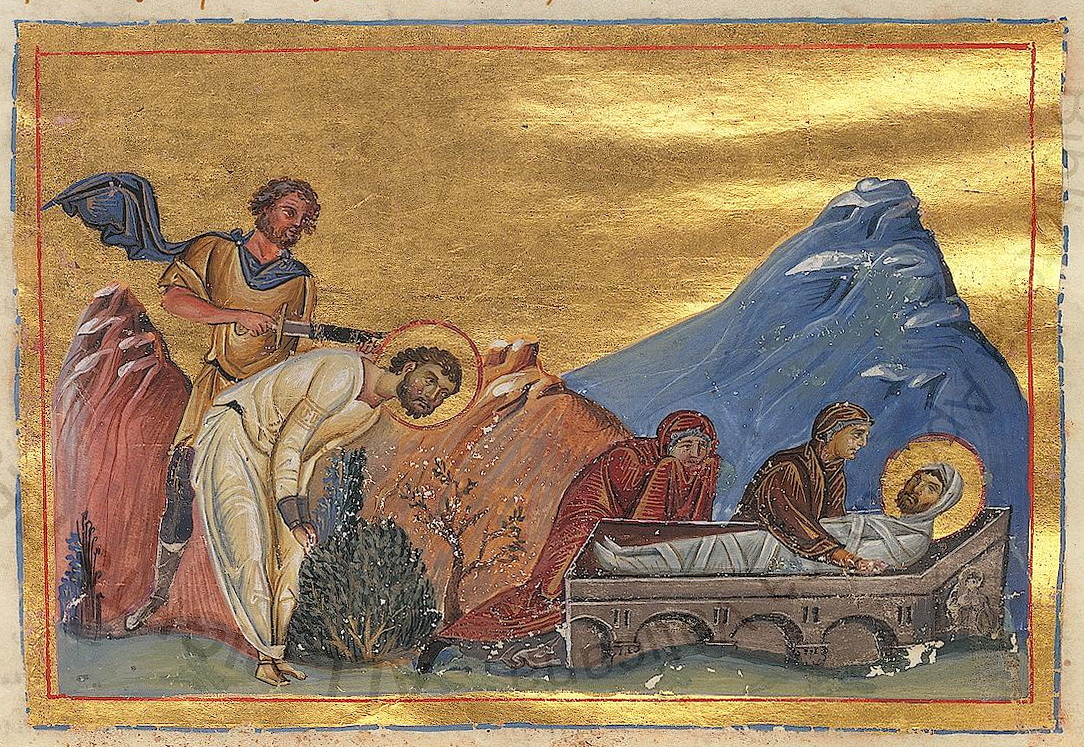
Martyr Adauctus and his daughter St. Callisthene of Ephesus.
(Menologion of Basil II, 10th century).

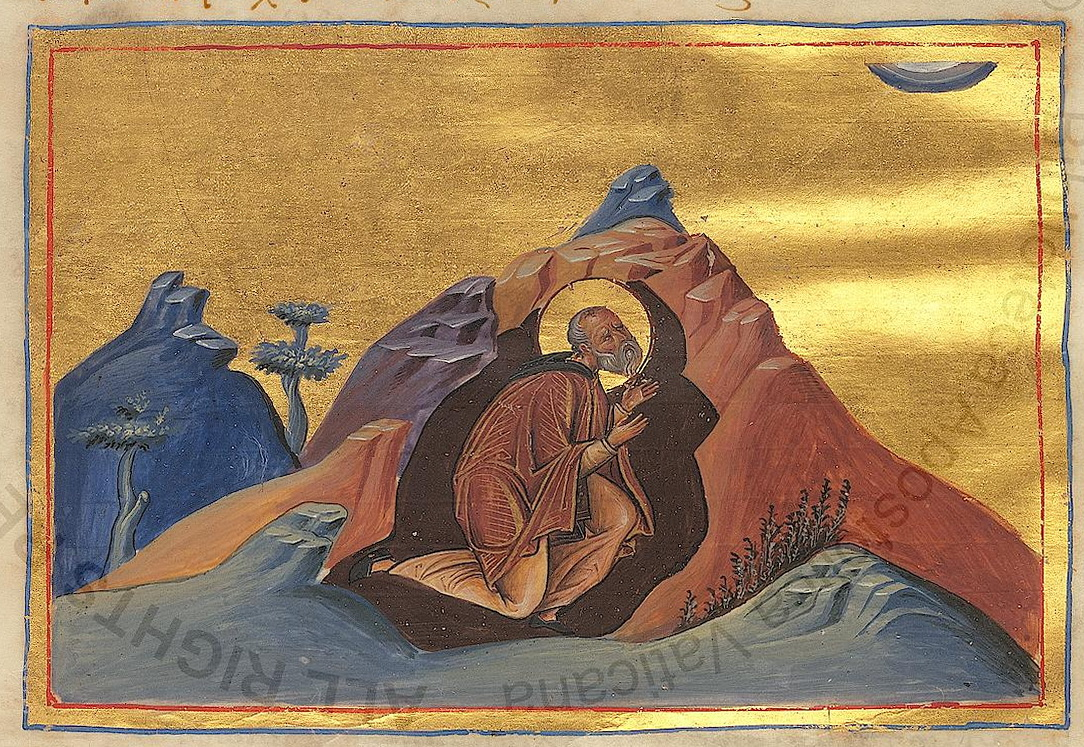
Venerable Paul the Simple of Egypt.
(Menologion of Basil II, 10th century).

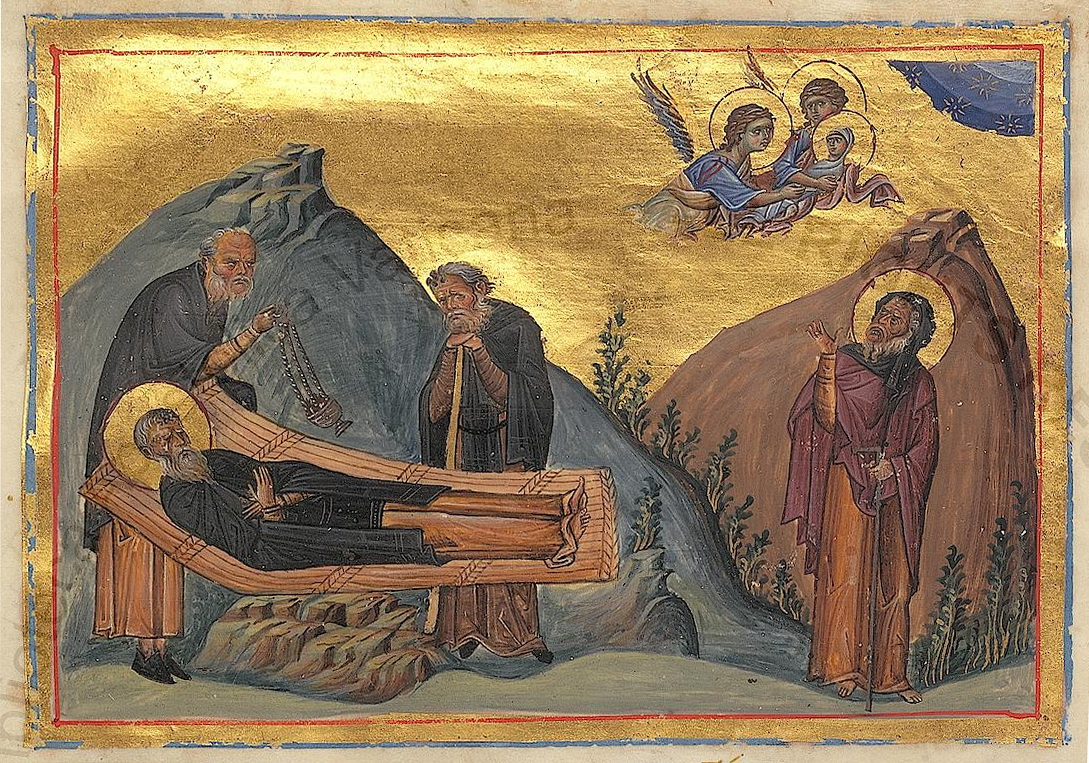
Venerable Ammon of Egypt.
(Menologion of Basil II, 10th century).

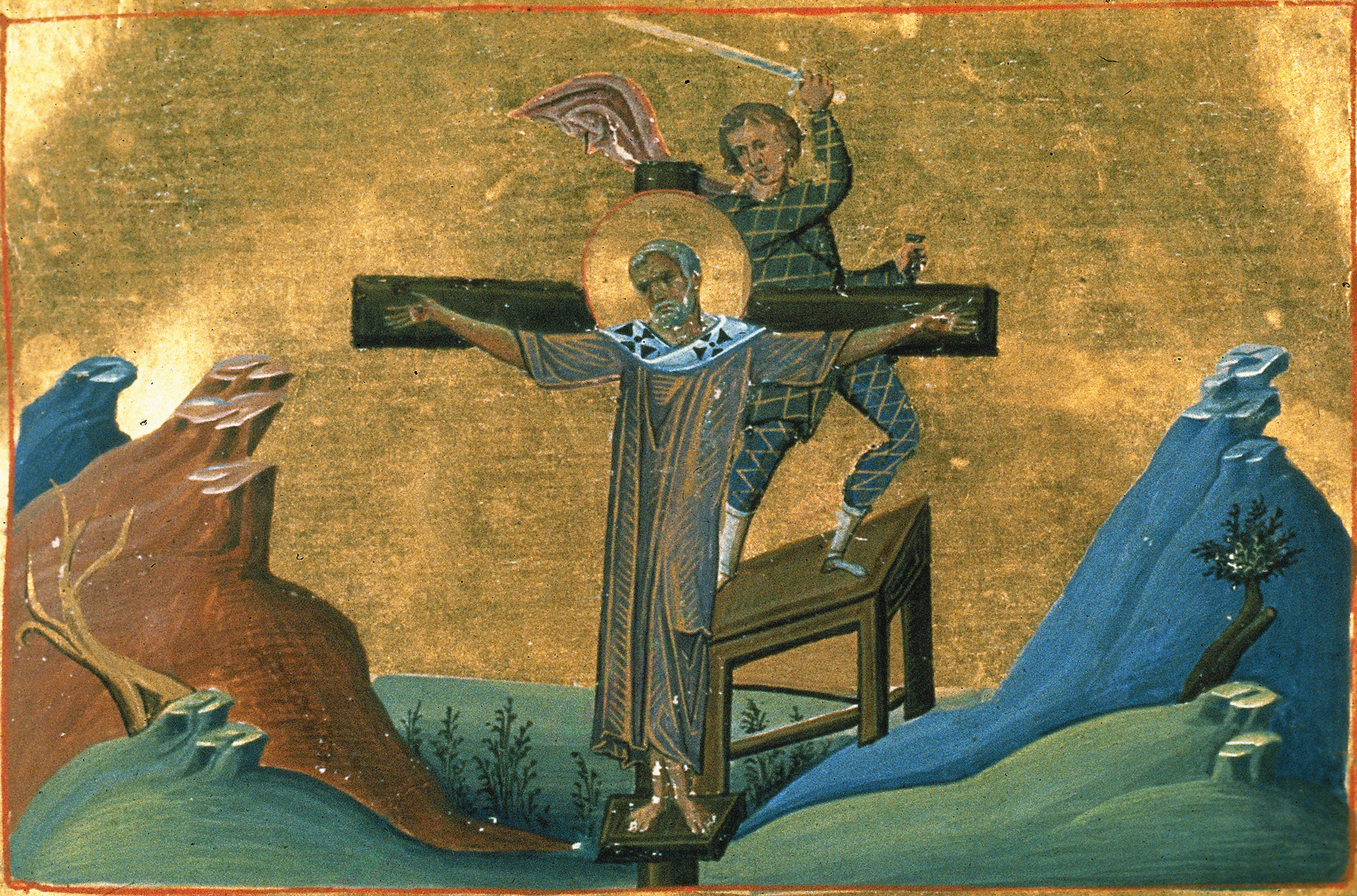
Hieromartyr Peter of Capitolia, Bishop of Bostra in Arabia.
(Menologion of Basil II, 10th century).

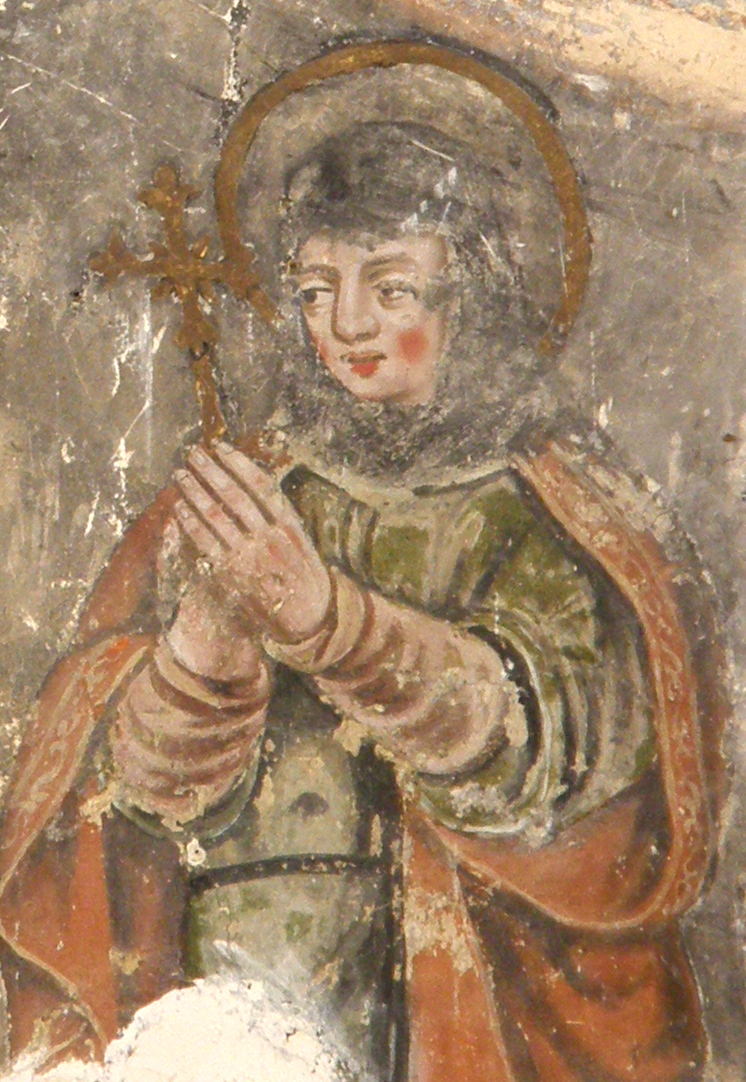
St. Aurea.

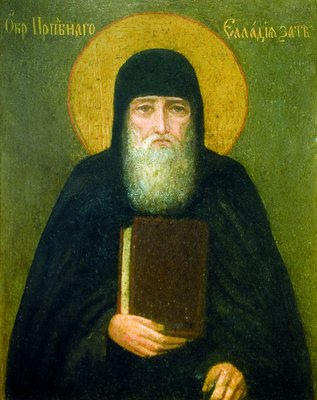
St. Helladius of Kiev.

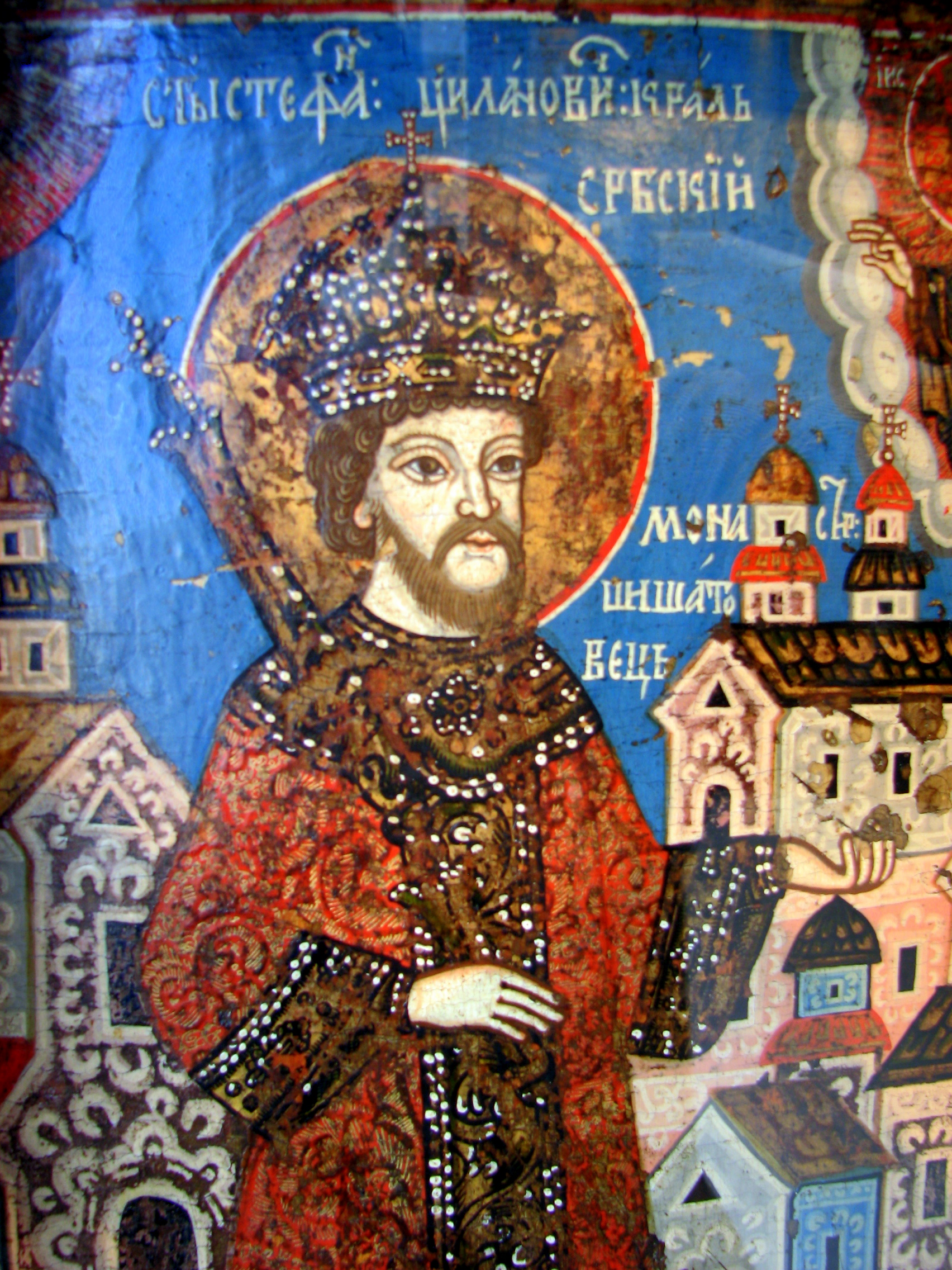
St. Stephen Stiljanovic, of Srem, Serbia.

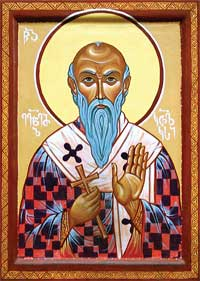
Hieromartyr Evdemoz I, Catholicos of Georgia.

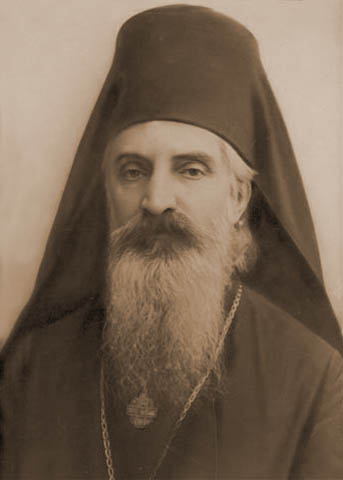
St. Nikodim Milaš of Dalmatia.

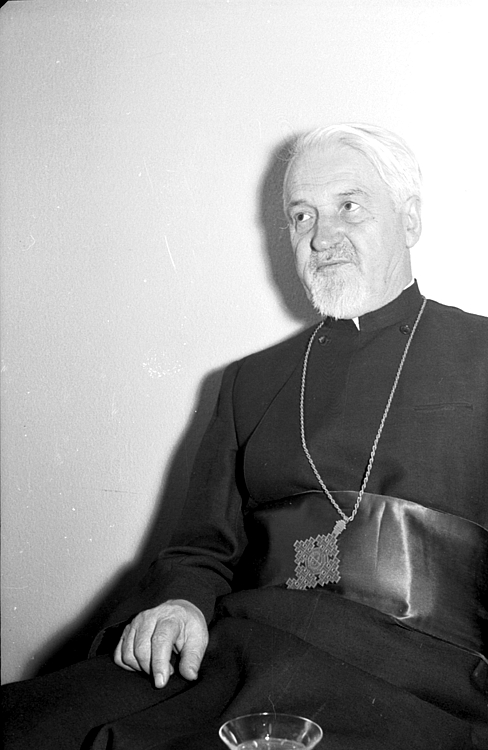
New Hiero-confessor Dumitru Stăniloae.

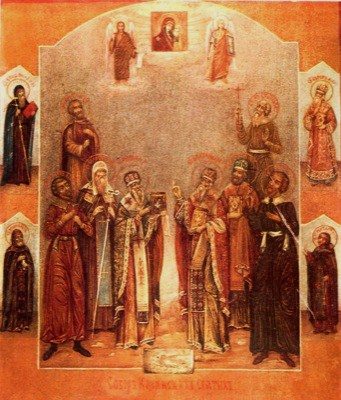
Synaxis of the Saints of Kazan.

== Sources ==
- October 4/17. Orthodox Calendar (PRAVOSLAVIE.RU).
- October 17 / October 4. HOLY TRINITY RUSSIAN ORTHODOX CHURCH (A parish of the Patriarchate of Moscow).
- October 4. OCA - The Lives of the Saints.
- The Autonomous Orthodox Metropolia of Western Europe and the Americas (ROCOR). St. Hilarion Calendar of Saints for the year of our Lord 2004. St. Hilarion Press (Austin, TX). p. 74.
- The Fourth Day of the Month of October. Orthodoxy in China.
- October 4. Latin Saints of the Orthodox Patriarchate of Rome.
- The Roman Martyrology. Transl. by the Archbishop of Baltimore. Last Edition, According to the Copy Printed at Rome in 1914. Revised Edition, with the Imprimatur of His Eminence Cardinal Gibbons. Baltimore: John Murphy Company, 1916. pp. 305–306.
- Rev. Richard Stanton. A Menology of England and Wales, or, Brief Memorials of the Ancient British and English Saints Arranged According to the Calendar, Together with the Martyrs of the 16th and 17th Centuries. London: Burns & Oates, 1892. pp. 474–475.

Greek Sources

- Great Synaxaristes: (in Greek) 4 ΟΚΤΩΒΡΙΟΥ. ΜΕΓΑΣ ΣΥΝΑΞΑΡΙΣΤΗΣ.
- (in Greek) Συναξαριστής. 4 Οκτωβρίου. ECCLESIA.GR. (H ΕΚΚΛΗΣΙΑ ΤΗΣ ΕΛΛΑΔΟΣ).
- (in Greek) 04/10/2016. Ορθόδοξος Συναξαριστής.

Russian Sources

- (in Russian) 17 октября (4 октября). Православная Энциклопедия под редакцией Патриарха Московского и всея Руси Кирилла (электронная версия). (Orthodox Encyclopedia - Pravenc.ru).
- (in Russian) 4 октября по старому стилю / 17 октября по новому стилю. Русская Православная Церковь - Православный церковный календарь на 2016 год.
