= October 3 (Eastern Orthodox liturgics) =

Day in the Eastern Orthodox liturgical calendar

Eastern Orthodox liturgical calendar
October 2	October 3	October 4
October 3 O.S. ≍ October 16 N.S. October 3 N.S ≍ September 20 O.S.

An Eastern Orthodox cross

October 3 in Eastern Orthodox liturgical calendars is a feast day and a day of commemoration of saints and martyrs. Although some Orthodox churches use the Revised Julian Calendar and others use the traditional Julian calendar, the fixed commemorations for their respective October 3 are broadly the same, no matter which calendar is used. (Note: Despite the dates being the same, the days to which they refer typically differ by 13 days. The notation Old Style or O.S. is sometimes used to indicate a date in the traditional Julian Calendar (the "Old Calendar"). The notation New Style or N.S. indicates a date in the Revised Julian calendar (the "New Calendar").)

== Saints ==
- Hieromartyr Dionysius of Athens, Bishop of Athens, and with him the priest Rusticus and the deacon Eleutherius, martyrs (96) (Note: Name days celebrated today include: Dionysius, Dionysis, Denis, Dennis (Διονύσιος); Dionysia, Denise (Διονυσία).) (Note: Acts 17:16-34; Mt 13:44-54.)
- Saint Damaris of Athens, a disciple of St. Dionysius of Athens (1st century) (see also: October 2)
- Hieromartyrs Dionysius, Bishop of Alexandria, and eight other martyrs including the Deacons Gaius, Faustus, Eusebius and Chaeremon (c. 265) (Note: "The same day the holy martyrs Denis, Faustus, Caius, Peter, Paul, and four others, who suffered much under Decius; and under Valerian, being a long time subjected to torments by the governor Æmilian, merited the palm of martyrdom.") (Note: The eight martyrs included: Faustus, Gaius, Peter, Paul, Eusebius, Chaeremon and two other martyrs. (See also: October 4))
- Martyr Theoctistus, by the sword.
- Martyr Theagenes, by fire.
- Martyr Theoteknos, by stoning.
- Saint Adauctus. (see also: October 4)
- Saint John the Chozebite, Bishop of Caesarea in Palestine (532)
- Blessed Hesychius the Silent, of Mt. Horeb (6th century)

== Pre-Schism Western saints ==
- Saint Candidus, a martyr in Rome, buried on the Esquiline Hill. (Note: "AT Rome, near the spot called Ursus Pileatus, St. Candidus, martyr.")
- Saint Menna (Manna), a holy virgin from Lorraine in France, related to Sts Eucherius and Elaptius (c. 395)
- Saint Maximian, a convert from Donatism, he became Bishop of Bagaia in Numidia in North Africa (404) (Note: Having deprived the Donatists of the basilica of Calvianum, he was grievously wounded and thrown off a tower by them.) (Note: "In Africa, St. Maximian, bishop of Bagay, who, after having frequently endured great cruelties from the Donatists, was finally cast headlong from a high tower, and left for dead. Illustrious by a glorious confession, he afterwards rested in the Lord.")
- Saint Cyprian of Toulon, a monk at St Victor at Marseilles and Bishop of Toulon in France (6th century)
- Hieromartyrs Hewald the White (Ewald the Fair) and Hewald the Black (Ewald the Dark), at Cologne (c. 695) (Note: Two brothers born in Northumbria in England who became monks and priests and followed St Willibrord to Frisia in Holland. They were martyred together in Aplerbeck, now a suburb of Dortmund in Germany.) (Note: "Among the ancient Saxons (in Westphalia), two holy martyrs of the name of Ewaldus, who being priests and preaching Christ in that country, were seized by the Pagans and put to death. During the night a great light appeared for a long time over their bodies, showing where they were, and how distinguished were their merits.")
- Saint Widradus (Waré), restorer of the monastery of Flavigny near Dijon in France, also founded the monastery of Saulieu (747)
- Saint Utto, founder of Metten Abbey (of the Benedictine Order) in Bavaria in Germany (829)
- Saint Gérard of Brogne, Abbot of Brogne (959) (Note: Born near Namur in Belgium, he went to France where he became a monk at St Denis. After some years he was ordained priest and left for Belgium in order to found a new monastery on his own estate at Brogne. He was Abbot here for twenty-two years and revived monastic life in Flanders, Lorraine and Champagne.) (Note: "In Belgium, in the diocese of Namur, St. Gerard, abbot.")
- Saint Froilan, Bishop of Léon (1006) (Note: Born in Lugo in Spain, together with his companion Attilanus he helped restore monastic life at Moreruela Abbey in Castile. Later he became Bishop of Léon.) (Note: See: (in Spanish) Froilán (santo). Wikipedia. (Spanish Wikipedia).)

== Post-Schism Orthodox saints ==
- Venerable Dionysius of the Kiev Caves, recluse (15th century) (Note: See: (in Russian) Дионисий Печерский. Википедии. (Russian Wikipedia).)

=== New Martys and Confessors ===
- New Hiero-confessor Agathangelus (Preobrazhensky), Metropolitan of Yaroslavl (1928) (Note: See: (in Russian) Агафангел (Преображенский). Википедии. (Russian Wikipedia).)

== Other commemorations ==
- Trubchevsk Icon of the Mother of God (1765), located in the Troitse-Scanov Convent.
- Repose of Blessed Olga, Fool-for-Christ, of Bogdanoya Bari and St. Petersburg (1960)
- Repose of Saint Ieronymos the Cappadocian of Aegina (Jerome of Aegina) (1966) (Note: Elder Ieronymos the Cappadocian of Aegina was one of the two great Elders of the Jesus Prayer in the twentieth century in the land of Greece, the other being the Elder Joseph the Hesychast of the Holy Mountain. Both were very strong in the interior prayer of the heart.)
- Uncovering of the relics (1988) of St. Joseph (Litovkin), Elder of Optina Monastery (1911) (Note: See: (in Russian) Иосиф Оптинский. Википедии. (Russian Wikipedia).)
- The Holy Synod of the Patriarchate of Constantinople resolved on October 3, 2019, to glorify seven New Martyrs of Kastoria: (Note: Note that the "Synaxis of the Saints of Kastoria" is a moveable feast held on the Third Sunday of November.) (Note: They were glorified at the proposal of Metropolitan Seraphim (Papakostas) of Kastoria. The resolution of the Holy Synod of the Ecumenical Patriarchate was as follows: (in Greek) α) Ἀπεφασίσθη, τῇ εἰσηγήσει τῆς Κανονικῆς Ἐπιτροπῆς, κατόπιν θεωρήσεως τοῦ ἁρμοδίως διαβιβασθέντος τῇ Μητρί Ἐκκλησίᾳ σχετικοῦ αἰτήματος τοῦ Σεβ. Μητροπολίτου Καστορίας κ. Σεραφείμ, ἡ ἀναγραφή εἰς τό Ἁγιολόγιον τῆς Ὀρθοδόξου Ἐκκλησίας τῶν μαρτυρικῶς τελειωθέντων ὑπέρ τῆς ἀμωμήτου ἡμῶν πίστεως: α) Μάρκου Πέτρου Μαρκούλη ἐκ Κλεισούρας, β) Νούλτζου ἐκ Καστορίας, καί τῶν σύν αὐτῷ ἀθλησάντων, γ) Γεωργίου τοῦ ἐκ Καστορίας, δ) ἱερέως Βασιλείου Καλαπαλίκη, ἐφημερίου Χιλιοδεντρίου Καστορίας καί ε) Ἀρχιμανδρίτου Πλάτωνος Ἀϊβαζίδη.)

- New Martyr Markos Markoulis of Kleisoura, Kastoria, hanged in Argos Orestiko (1598)
- New Martyr Ioannis Noultzos, martyred together with his brother and brother-in-law in Kastoria (1696)
- New Martyr George of Kastoria, martyred by the Hagarenes in the Acarnania region.
- New Hieromartyr Vasilios Kalapaliki, priest of Chiliodendro, Kastoria (gr) (1902)
- New Hieromartyr Archimandrite Platon (Aivazidis), Protosyncellus of Metropolitan Germanos Karavangelis (1921) (Note: He was hanged by the Turks on September 21, 1921.: See: (in Greek) Πλάτων Αϊβαζίδης. Βικιπαίδεια. (Greek Wikipedia).)

== Icon gallery ==
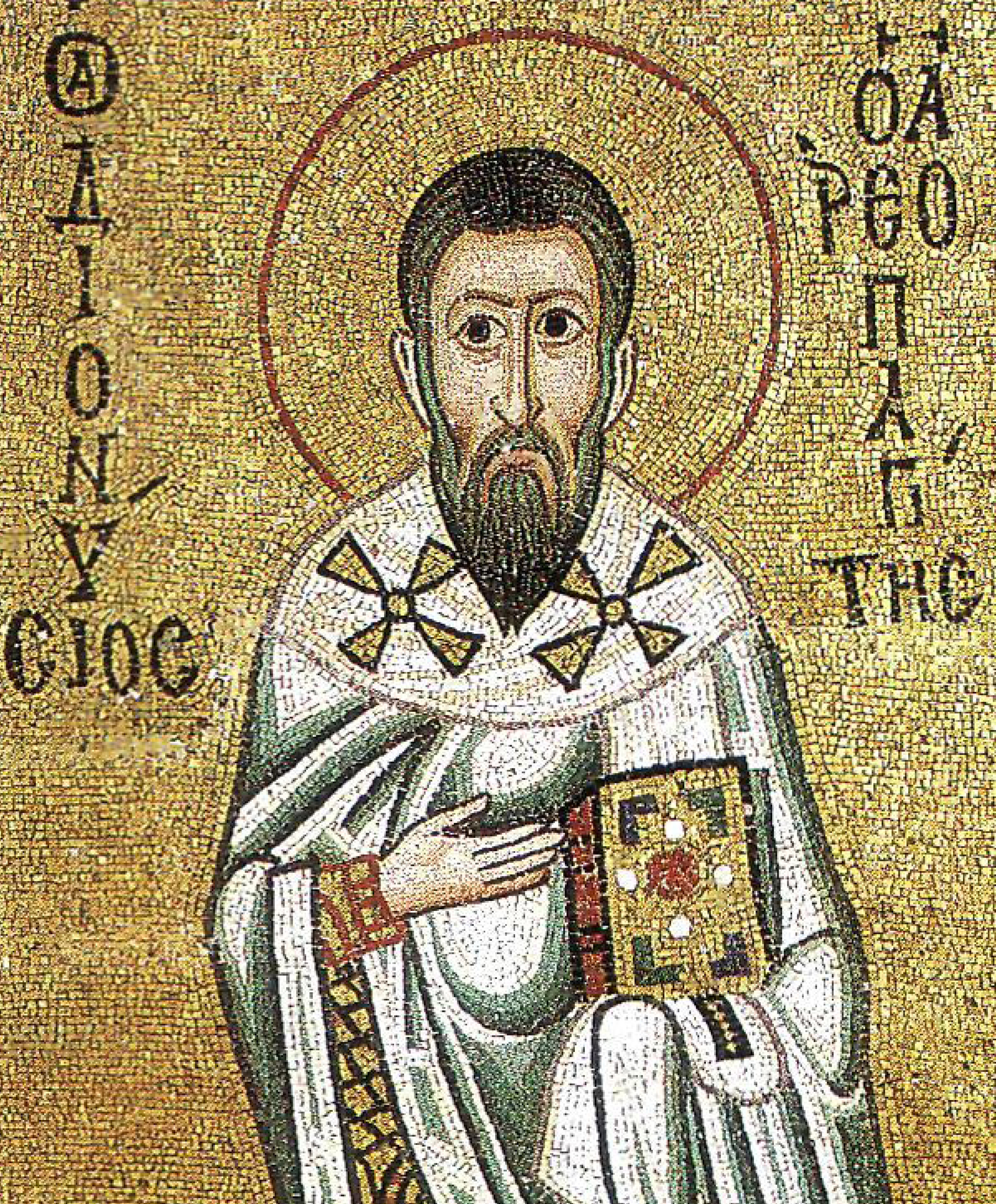
Hieromartyr Dionysius of Athens, Bishop of Athens.
(Hosios Loukas Monastery, Boeotia, Greece).

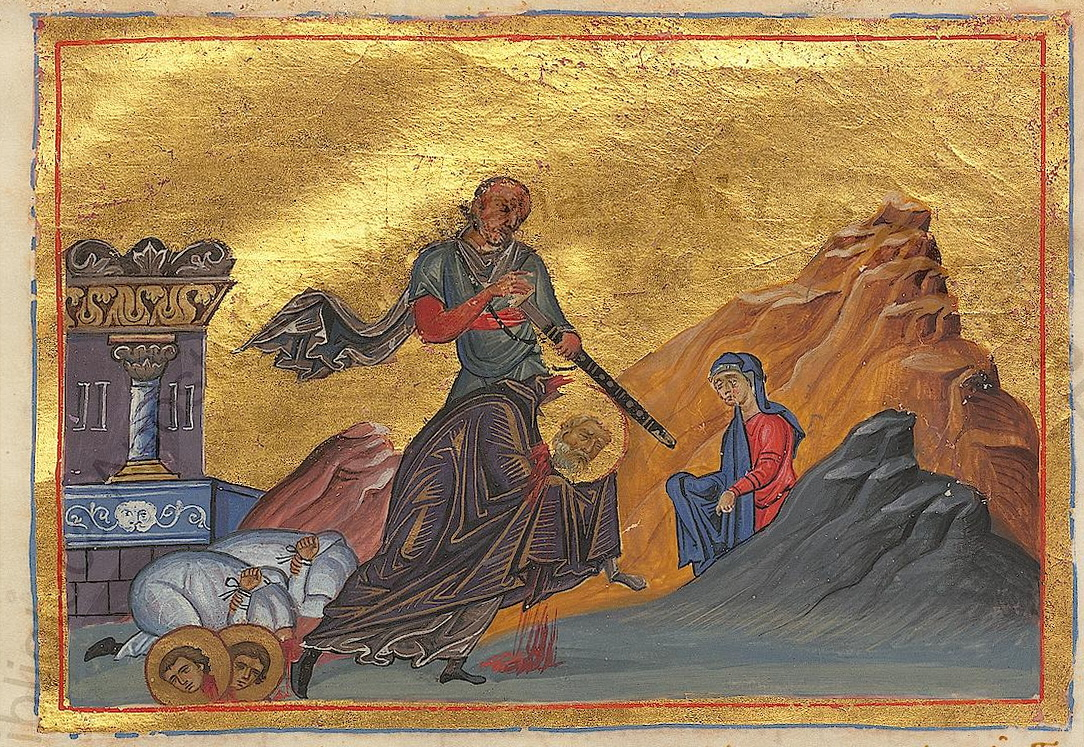
Hieromartyr Dionysius of Athens, and martyrs Rusticus and Eleutherius.
(Menologion of Basil II, 10th century).

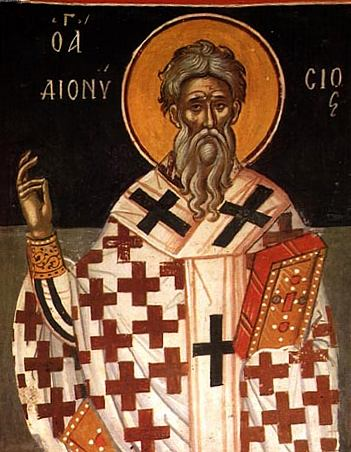
Hieromartyr Dionysius, Bishop of Alexandria.

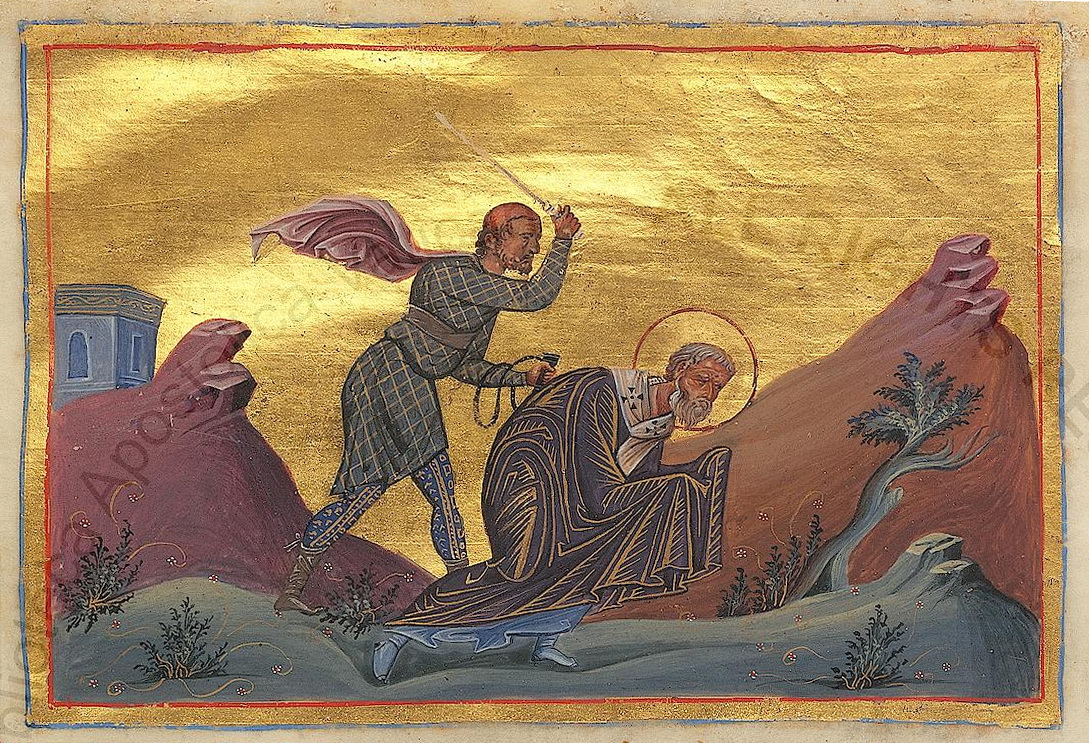
Hieromartyr Dionysius, Bishop of Alexandria.
(Menologion of Basil II, 10th century).

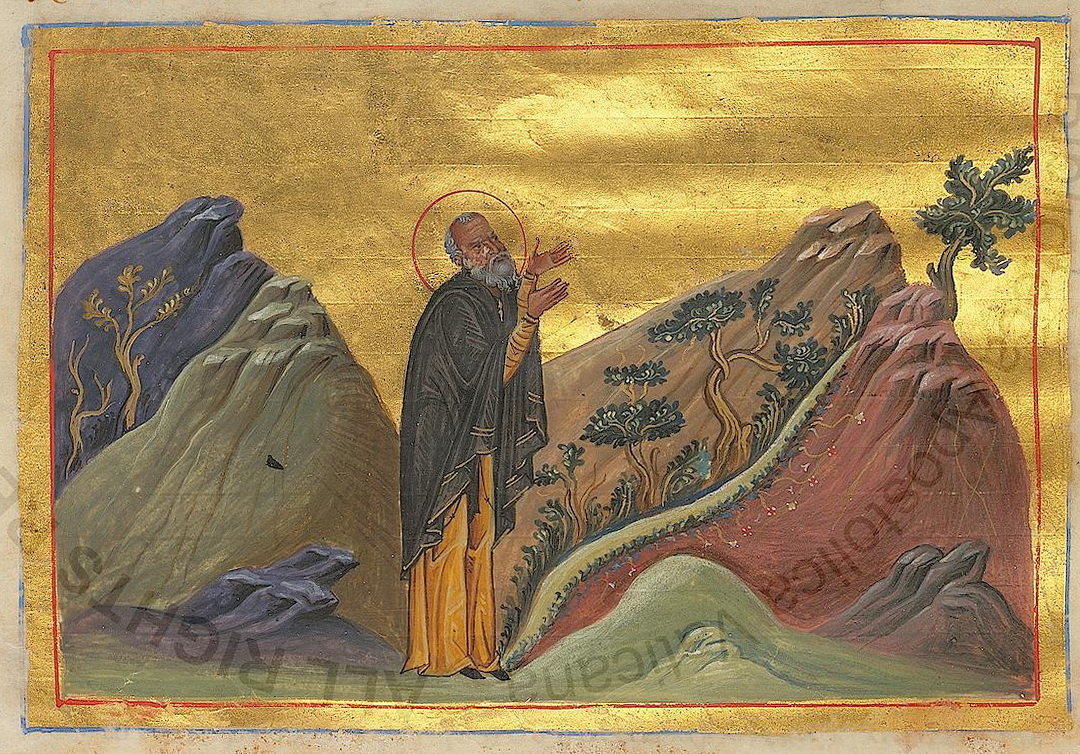
Saint John the Chozebite, Bishop of Caesarea in Palestine.
(Menologion of Basil II, 10th century).

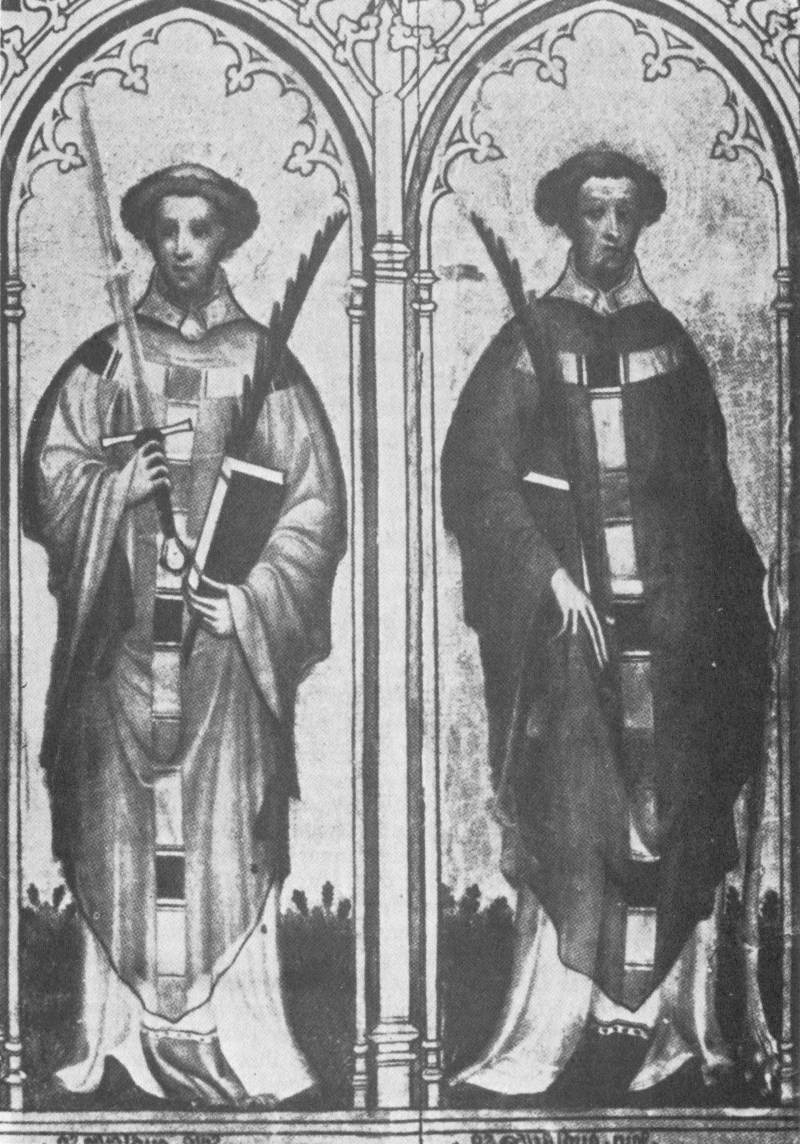
Hieromartyrs Ewald the Fair and Ewald the Dark.

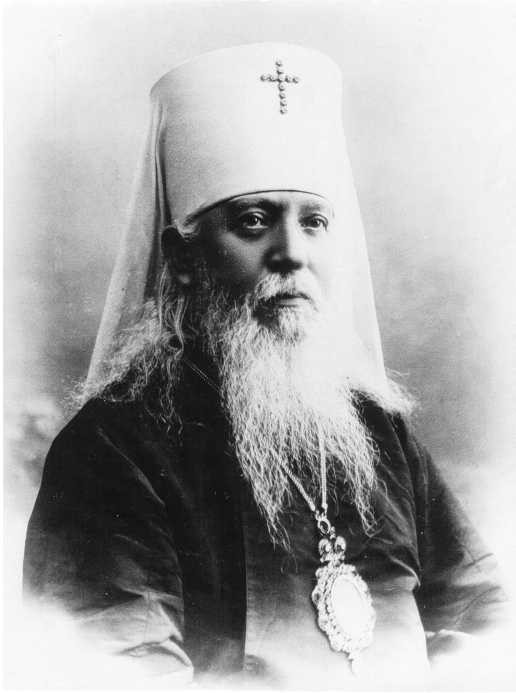
New Hiero-confessor Agathangelus (Preobrazhensky), Metropolitan of Yaroslavl.

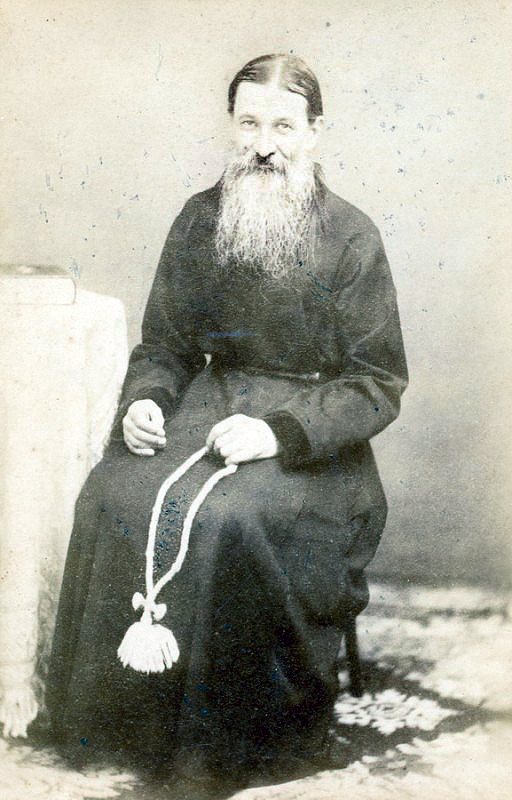
St. Joseph (Litovkin), Elder of Optina Monastery.

== Sources ==
- October 3/16. Orthodox Calendar (PRAVOSLAVIE.RU).
- October 16 / October 3. HOLY TRINITY RUSSIAN ORTHODOX CHURCH (A parish of the Patriarchate of Moscow).
- October 3. OCA - The Lives of the Saints.
- The Autonomous Orthodox Metropolia of Western Europe and the Americas (ROCOR). St. Hilarion Calendar of Saints for the year of our Lord 2004. St. Hilarion Press (Austin, TX). p. 73.
- The Third Day of the Month of October. Orthodoxy in China.
- October 3. Latin Saints of the Orthodox Patriarchate of Rome.
- The Roman Martyrology. Transl. by the Archbishop of Baltimore. Last Edition, According to the Copy Printed at Rome in 1914. Revised Edition, with the Imprimatur of His Eminence Cardinal Gibbons. Baltimore: John Murphy Company, 1916. p. 305.
- Rev. Richard Stanton. A Menology of England and Wales, or, Brief Memorials of the Ancient British and English Saints Arranged According to the Calendar, Together with the Martyrs of the 16th and 17th Centuries. London: Burns & Oates, 1892. pp. 473–474.

Greek Sources

- Great Synaxaristes: (in Greek) 3 ΟΚΤΩΒΡΙΟΥ. ΜΕΓΑΣ ΣΥΝΑΞΑΡΙΣΤΗΣ.
- (in Greek) Συναξαριστής. 3 Οκτωβρίου. ECCLESIA.GR. (H ΕΚΚΛΗΣΙΑ ΤΗΣ ΕΛΛΑΔΟΣ).
- (in Greek) 03/10/2016. Ορθόδοξος Συναξαριστής.

Russian Sources

- (in Russian) 16 октября (3 октября). Православная Энциклопедия под редакцией Патриарха Московского и всея Руси Кирилла (электронная версия). (Orthodox Encyclopedia - Pravenc.ru).
- (in Russian) 3 октября по старому стилю / 16 октября по новому стилю. Русская Православная Церковь - Православный церковный календарь на 2016 год.
