= October 15 (Eastern Orthodox liturgics) =

Day in the Eastern Orthodox liturgical calendar

Eastern Orthodox liturgical calendar
October 14	October 15	October 16
October 15 O.S. ≍ October 28 N.S. October 15 N.S ≍ October 2 O.S.

An Eastern Orthodox cross

October 15 in Eastern Orthodox liturgical calendars is a feast day and a day of commemoration of saints and martyrs. Although some Orthodox churches use the Revised Julian Calendar and others use the traditional Julian calendar, the fixed commemorations for their respective October 15 are broadly the same, no matter which calendar is used. (Note: Despite the dates being the same, the days to which they refer typically differ by 13 days. The notation Old Style or O.S. is sometimes used to indicate a date in the traditional Julian Calendar (the "Old Calendar"). The notation New Style or N.S. indicates a date in the Revised Julian calendar (the "New Calendar").)

== Saints ==
- Martyrs Sarbelus (Thathuil) and his sister Bebaia, of Edessa (98-138) (see also: January 29 )
- Hieromartyr Lucian of Antioch, Presbyter of Greater Antioch (312) (Note: Name days celebrated today include: Lucian, Loukianos (Λουκιανὸς).)
- Venerable Barsus the Confessor, Bishop of Edessa (378)
- St. Theophilus I of Alexandria, 23rd Pope of Alexandria and Patriarch of the See of St. Mark (d. 412).
- Saint Sabinus, Bishop of Catania, Wonderworker (760) (Note: Bishop of Catania in Sicily. After a few years as bishop he resigned and became a hermit.)
- Venerable Euthymius the New, of Thessalonica, Confessor (889) (see also: January 4)

== Pre-Schism Western saints ==
- Saint Agileus, martyred in Carthage in North Africa, (c. 300) (Note: "At Carthage, St. Agileus, martyr, on whose birthday St. Augustine preached his panegyric." His relics were later translated to Rome.) (Note: "S. AUGUSTINE preached a sermon on the festival of S. Agleus, and mention is made of the church dedicated to this saint in the life of S. Fulgentius of Ruspe. S. Gregory the Great received the relics of the saint from Dominicus, Bishop of Carthage, as appears from a letter of the great pope which is extant.")
- Saint Aurelia of Strasbourg (Alsace, Gaul) (c. 383)
- Saint Severus of Trier, Bishop of Trier in Germany, Confessor (c. 455) (Note: Born in France, he was a disciple of St Germanus of Auxerre and St Lupus of Troyes. He accompanied St Germanus to Britain to oppose the Pelagian heresy. He preached the Gospel to the Germans on the lower Moselle and became Bishop of Trier in Germany (446-c 455).)
- Saint Antiochus of Lyon (Andeol), Bishop of Lyon (5th century) (Note: When St Justus, Bishop of Lyon in France, joined the hermits in Egypt, the priest Antiochus was sent to seek him out and persuade him to return to his diocese. The priest's efforts were in vain and on his return to Lyon he was himself chosen bishop.) (Note: "At Lyon, St. Antiochus, bishop, who entered the heavenly kingdom after having courageously fulfilled the duties of the high station to which he had been called.")
- Saint Cannatus (Canus Natus), Bishop of Marseilles in France after St Honoratus (5th century)
- Saint Fortunatus, a martyr in Rome (537?) (Note: "At Rome, on the Aurelian road, St. Fortunatus, martyr.")
- Saint Leonard of Vandœuvre, a hermit who founded Vandoeuvre, now Saint-Léonard-des-Bois, near Le Mans in France (c. 570)
- Saint Thecla, Abbess, of Ochsenfurt, Germany (c. 790) (Note: [Roman and German Martyrologies. Wyon, Wilson, and Bucelinus.]: "S. Thecla was a virgin in Wimborne Abbey, who accompanied S. Lioba to Germany when the latter was summoned thither by her kinsman, S. Boniface. Thecla was apparently also related to S. Boniface; she was made by him abbess of the monastery of Kitzingen-on-the-Maine, on the death of S. Hadeloga in 766. Before that she ruled the abbey of Ochsenfurt.") (Note: "ST. THECLA was one of the holy religious whom St Boniface called from England, to establish the rule of St. Benedict, among those of her own sex, in the country which he had recently conquered to the Faith. She was a kinswoman of St. Lioba, and like her a disciple of St. Tetta at Wimborne. It is probable that the two went to Germany at the same time. Thecla, at all events, was at one time an inmate of St. Lioba's Monastery at Bischoffsheim, as is mentioned in the life of the latter Saint. At one time St. Thecla presided over the Abbey of Ochsenfurt, where she may have been placed by St. Boniface himself; and it was, perhaps, subsequently that she succeeded St. Hadeloga at Kitzengen. It was in this latter abbey that she completed her earthly course, and closed a holy life in a peaceful and saintly death.")
- Saint Odilo, a monk at Gorze Abbey in Lorraine in France, who became Abbot of Stavelot-Malmédy in Belgium (c. 954)
- Saint Callistus, martyr (1003) (Note: Born in Huesca in Spain, together with St Mercutialis he went to France and was killed by the Saracens.)
- Saint Bruno of Merseburg (Bruno-Boniface), Archbishop of Mersburg, martyred by the heathen Prussians (1009) (Note: Born in Querfurt in Germany, he accompanied the half-Greek Emperor Otto III to Italy in 996 and became a monk there. He became Archbishop of Mersburg and was sent to enlighten the heathen Prussians. He was martyred with eighteen companions.) (Note: "In Prussia, St. Bruno, bishop of the Ruthenians and martyr, who, preaching the Gospel in that region, was arrested by impious men, had his hands and feet cut off and was beheaded.")
- Saint Willa, a nun at Nonnberg Abbey near Salzburg in Austria who reposed as an anchoress (c. 1050)

== Post-Schism Orthodox saints ==
- Hieromartyr Lucian, Hieromonk of the Kiev Caves (1243)
- Saint John, Bishop of Suzdal (1373) (Note: See: (in Russian) Иоанн (епископ Суздальский). Википе́дия. (Russian Wikipedia).)
- Saint Dionysius, Archbishop of Suzdal (1385)
- Saint Magdalena of Mălainița (Măndalina Milenco), a worthy and industrious believer of the Romanian community from Mălainița, of the Timoc Vicariate in Serbia (1962) (Note: See: (in Romanian) Măndălina Cătălinici. Wikipedia. (Romanian Wikipedia).)

=== New Martys and Confessors ===
- New Hieromartyr Symeon Konyukhov, Priest (1918)
- New Hieromartyr Valerian Novitsky, Priest, of Telyadovich (1930)
- New Hieromartyr Demetrius Kasatkin, Priest (1942)
- New Hiero-confessor Athanasius (Sakharov), Bishop of Kovrov (1962) (Note: See: (in Russian) Афанасий (Сахаров). Википе́дия. (Russian Wikipedia).)
- Synaxis of the 23 New Hieromartyrs of the Minsk Diocese of Belorussia (1930-1950): (Note: On October 28, 1999 (≍ October 15 O.S.), 23 new martyrs were canonized by the Holy Synod of the Belarusian Exarchate as locally venerated saints.)

- Archimandrite: Seraphim (Shakhmut), of Zhyrovichy Monastery (1945); (Note: See: (in Russian) Серафим (Шахмуть). Википедии. (Russian Wikipedia).)
- Priests: Alexander Shalai (1937); Vladimir Zubkovich (1938); Vasily Izmailov (1930); Vladimir Pasternatsky (1938); Vladimir Khirasko (1932); (Note: See: (in Russian) Хираско, Владимир Григорьевич. Википедии. (Russian Wikipedia).) Dimitry Pavsky (1937); (Note: See: (in Russian) Павский, Дмитрий Александрович. Википедии. (Russian Wikipedia).) John Voronet (1937); Leonid Biryukovich (1937); Matthew Kritsuk (1950); Michael Novitsky (1935); Michael Plyshevsky (1937); Sergius Rodakovsky (1933); Valerian Novitsky (1930); (Note: See: (in Russian) Новицкий, Валериан Васильевич. Википедии. (Russian Wikipedia).) Vladimir Taliush (1933); Vladimir Khrischanovich (1933); Dimitry Plyshevsky (1938); John Vecherko (1933); John Pankratovich (1937); Nicholas Matskevich (1937); Peter Grudinsky (1930); (Note: See: (in Russian) Грудинский, Пётр Феофилович. Википедии. (Russian Wikipedia).) Porphyrius Rubanovich (1943); and
- Deacon: Nicholas Vasyukovich (1937).

== Other commemorations ==
- Icon of the Most Holy Theotokos "She Who Ripens the Grain" / "The Grower of Crops" (19th century) (Note: See: (in Russian) Спорительница хлебов. Википе́дия. (Russian Wikipedia).)

== Icon gallery ==
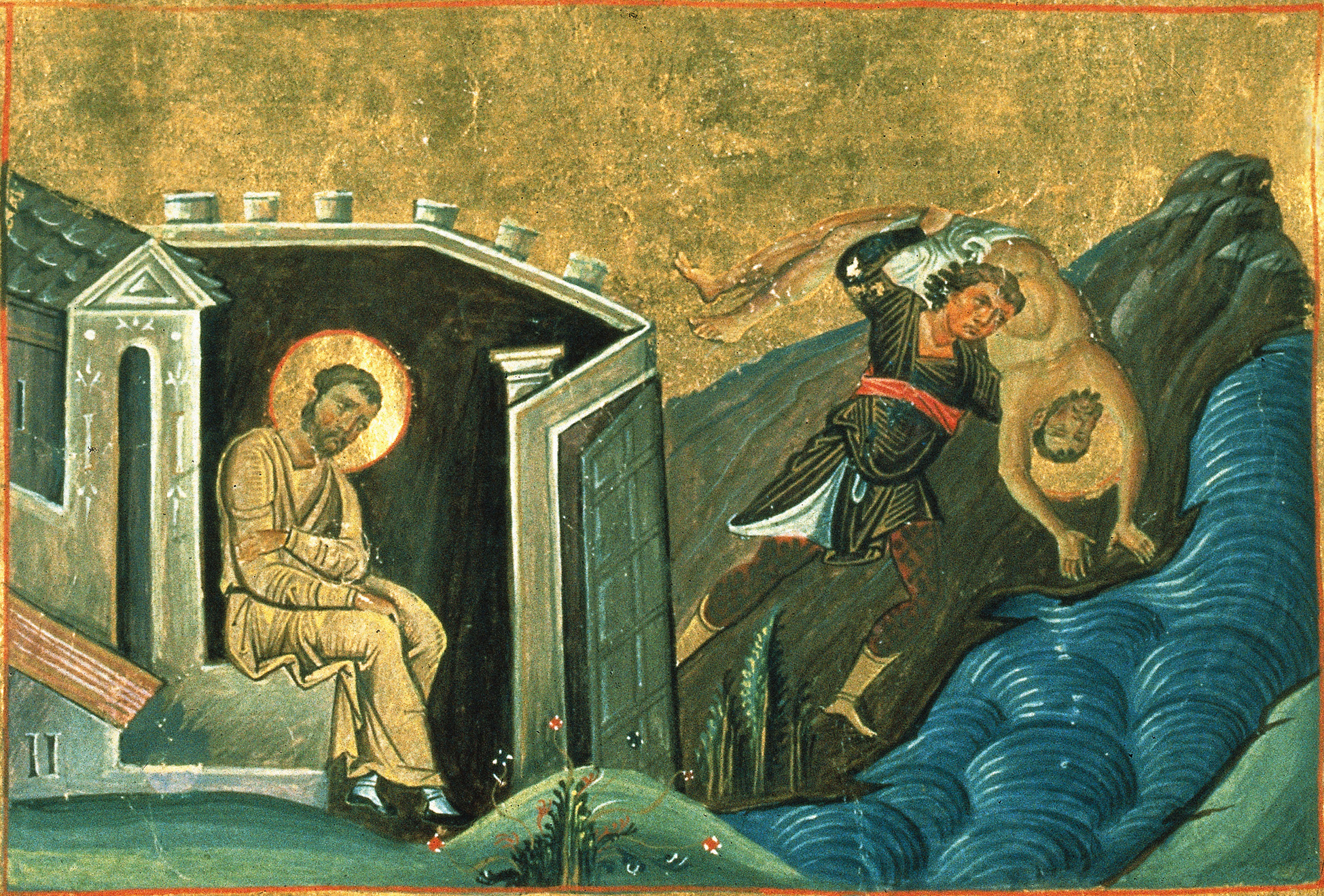
'Hieromartyr Lucian of Antioch, Presbyter of Greater Antioch.
(Menologion of Basil II, 10th century).

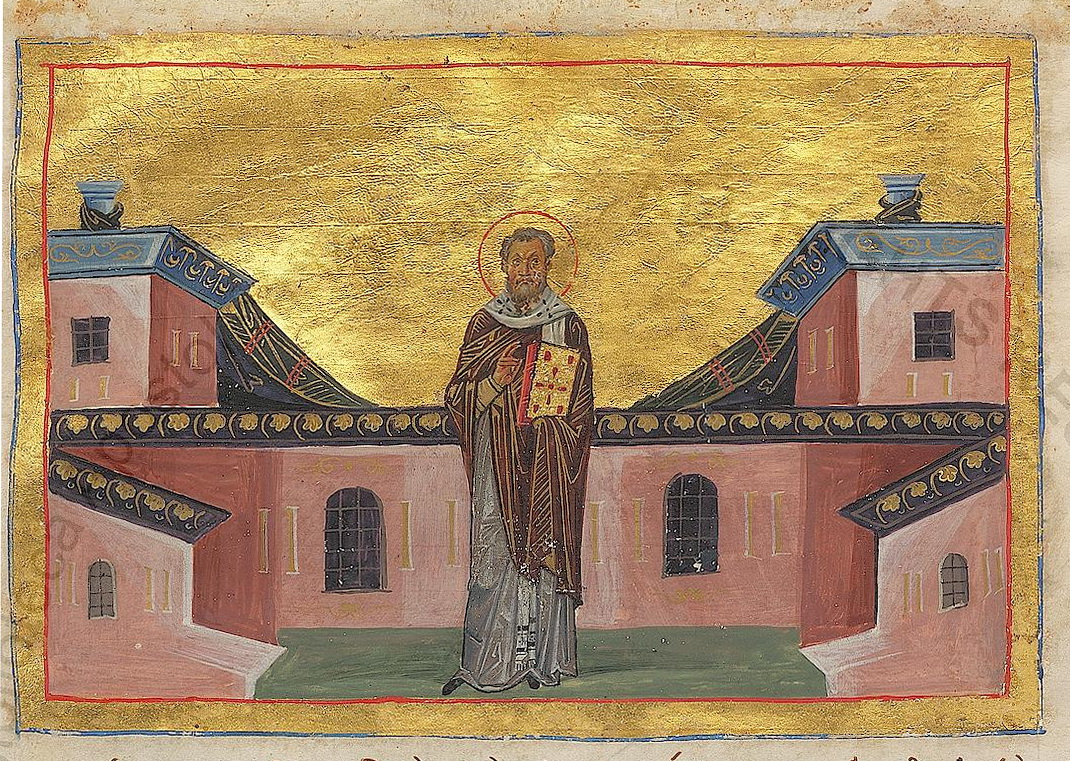
St. Sabinus, Bishop of Catania, Wonderworker.
(Menologion of Basil II, 10th century).

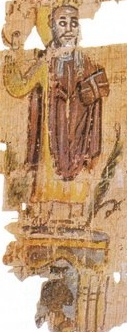
St. Theophilus at the Serapeum
(from the Alexandrian World Chronicle).

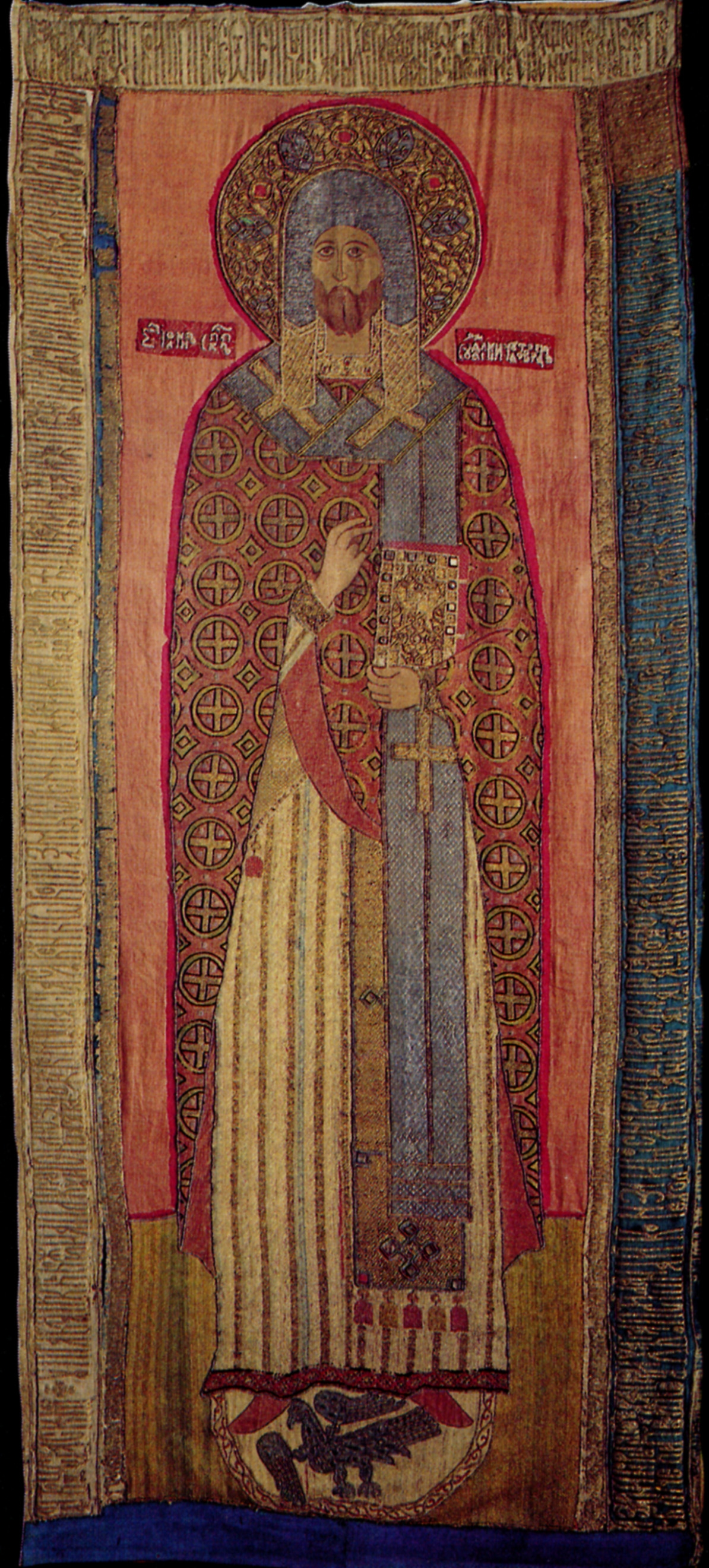
St. John, Bishop of Suzdal.

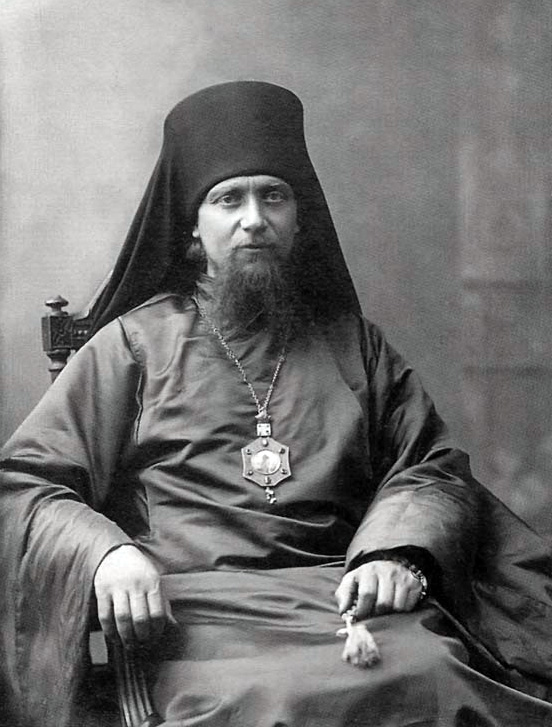
New Hiero-confessor Athanasius (Sakharov), Bishop of Kovrov.

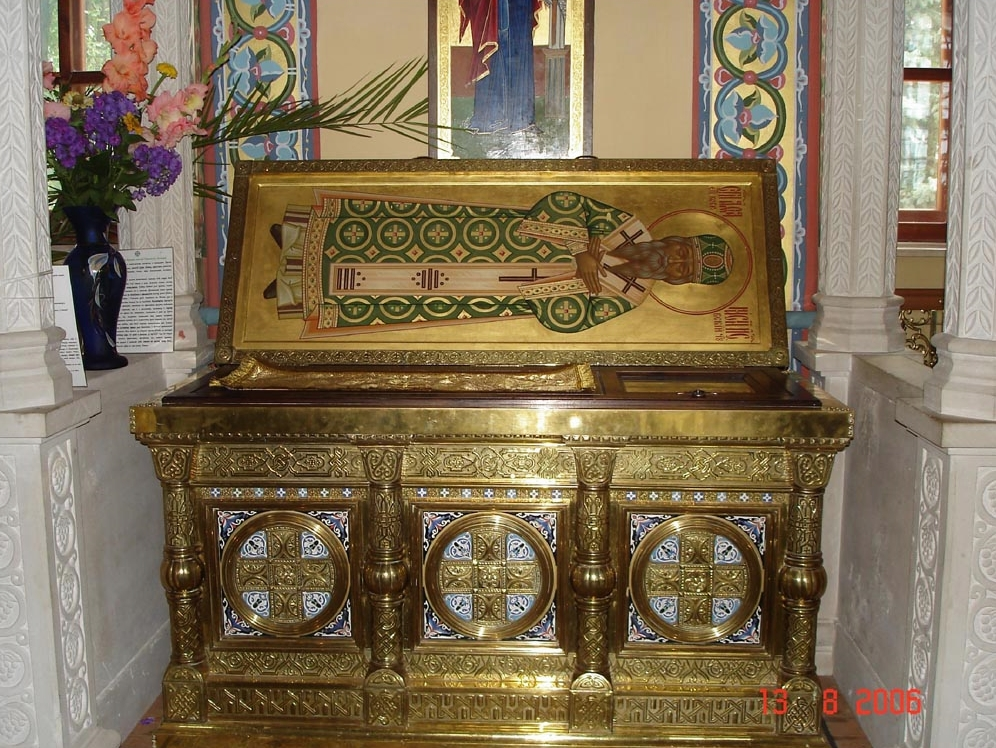
Reliquary of New Hiero-confessor Athanasius (Sakharov), Bishop of Kovrov.

New Hieromartyr Archimandrite Seraphim (Shakhmut), of Zhyrovichy Monastery.

New Hieromartyr Vladimir Khirasko.

New Hieromartyr Dimitry Pavsky.

New Hieromartyr Peter Grudinsky.

Icon of the Most Holy Theotokos "She Who Ripens the Grain".

== Sources ==
- October 15/28. Orthodox Calendar (PRAVOSLAVIE.RU).
- October 28 / October 15. HOLY TRINITY RUSSIAN ORTHODOX CHURCH (A parish of the Patriarchate of Moscow).
- October 15. OCA - The Lives of the Saints.
- The Autonomous Orthodox Metropolia of Western Europe and the Americas (ROCOR). St. Hilarion Calendar of Saints for the year of our Lord 2004. St. Hilarion Press (Austin, TX). pp. 76–77.
- The Fifteenth Day of the Month of October. Orthodoxy in China.
- October 15. Latin Saints of the Orthodox Patriarchate of Rome.
- The Roman Martyrology. Transl. by the Archbishop of Baltimore. Last Edition, According to the Copy Printed at Rome in 1914. Revised Edition, with the Imprimatur of His Eminence Cardinal Gibbons. Baltimore: John Murphy Company, 1916. pp. 318–319.
- Rev. Richard Stanton. A Menology of England and Wales, or, Brief Memorials of the Ancient British and English Saints Arranged According to the Calendar, Together with the Martyrs of the 16th and 17th Centuries. London: Burns & Oates, 1892. pp. 493–494.

Greek Sources

- Great Synaxaristes: (in Greek) 15 ΟΚΤΩΒΡΙΟΥ. ΜΕΓΑΣ ΣΥΝΑΞΑΡΙΣΤΗΣ.
- (in Greek) Συναξαριστής. 15 Οκτωβρίου. ECCLESIA.GR. (H ΕΚΚΛΗΣΙΑ ΤΗΣ ΕΛΛΑΔΟΣ).
- (in Greek) 15/10/2017. Ορθόδοξος Συναξαριστής.

Russian Sources

- (in Russian) 28 октября (15 октября). Православная Энциклопедия под редакцией Патриарха Московского и всея Руси Кирилла (электронная версия). (Orthodox Encyclopedia - Pravenc.ru).
- (in Russian) 15 октября по старому стилю / 28 октября по новому стилю. Русская Православная Церковь - Православный церковный календарь на 2016 год.
