= Euthymius the Younger =

9th-century Byzantine Christian monk

Saint Euthymius the Younger
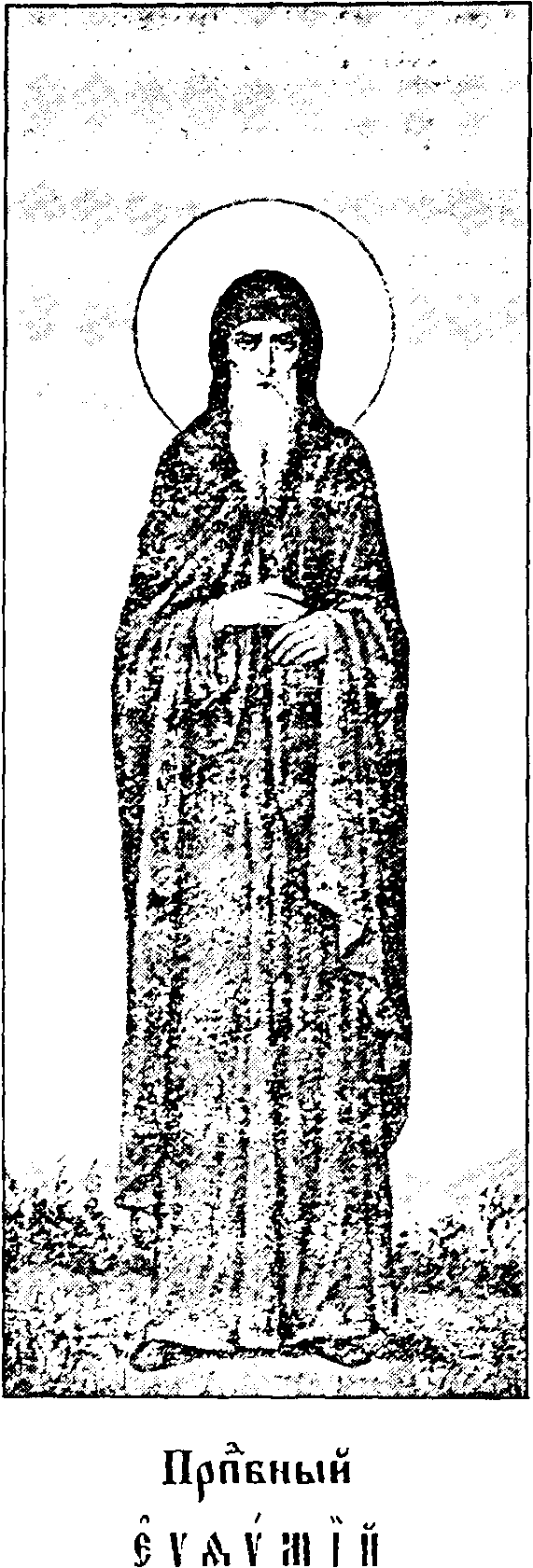

Venerable
- Born: 823 or 824; Opso, Galatia
- Died: 898; Hiera
- Venerated in: Eastern Orthodox Church
- Feast: October 15

Euthymius the Younger or Euthymius of Thessalonica (born 823 or 824; died 898), also known as Euthymios the New, was a Christian monk and hermit who lived on Mount Athos in Greece.

== Biography ==
Euthymius the Younger was born with the baptismal name Niketas in Opso, Galatia either in 823 or 824. Around 848, he lived at Mount Olympus in Bithynia, and later he moved to Mount Athos. He also established a double monastery at Peristerai on Mount Chortiatis near Thessalonica.

While living in solitude, he died on the island of Hiera on 14 or 15 October 898. His feast day is October 15.

== Vita ==
His disciple Basil wrote a hagiography or vita (MS BHG 655) of Euthymius. The vita was written in high-register Byzantine Greek and cites writers such as Gregory of Nazianzos, Cyril of Alexandria, John of the Ladder, Theodore of Stoudios, and pseudo-Eustathios of Thessalonica.

== See also ==
- Athanasius the Athonite
- Maximos of Kafsokalyvia
- Niphon of Kafsokalyvia
