= October 16 (Eastern Orthodox liturgics) =

Day in the Eastern Orthodox liturgical calendar

Eastern Orthodox liturgical calendar
October 15	October 16	October 17
October 16 O.S. ≍ October 29 N.S. October 16 N.S ≍ October 3 O.S.

An Eastern Orthodox cross

October 16 in Eastern Orthodox liturgical calendars is a feast day and a day of commemoration of saints and martyrs. Although some Orthodox churches use the Revised Julian Calendar and others use the traditional Julian calendar, the fixed commemorations for their respective October 16 are broadly the same, no matter which calendar is used. (Note: Despite the dates being the same, the days to which they refer typically differ by 13 days. The notation Old Style or O.S. is sometimes used to indicate a date in the traditional Julian Calendar (the "Old Calendar"). The notation New Style or N.S. indicates a date in the Revised Julian calendar (the "New Calendar").)

== Saints ==
- Martyr Longinus the Centurion who stood at the Cross of the Lord and at his Tomb (1st century)
- Martyrs Isaurus and Aphrodisius, who suffered with St. Longinus (1st century) (Note: The Greek Synaxarion refers to the "Holy Two Soldiers" who were martyred together with St. Longinus the Centurion, however, without giving their names.)
- Saints Leontius, Dometius, Terence and Domninus, martyrs by fire.
- Venerable Malus the Hermit.

== Pre-Schism Western saints ==
- Saint Eliphius (Eloff), born in Ireland, he was martyred in Toul in France under Julian the Apostate (362) (Note: In the tenth century his relics were translated to Cologne in Germany.)
- Saint Bolonia, a holy virgin aged fifteen and martyred under Julian the Apostate (362) (Note: She left her name to the village of Saint Boulogne in Maine in France.) (Note: "THIS saint is said to have been a maiden of fifteen, left an orphan early, and committed to a Christian nurse, who sent her to keep sheep at her little farm, where now stands the village of S. Boulogne in Expilly, in the Department of Haute Marne. She was admired for her beauty by an officer of Julian the Apostate, and because she turned a deaf ear to his addresses he had her tortured and put to death.")
- Saint Florentinus of Trier, successor of St Severinus as Bishop of Trier in Germany (4th century)
- Saint Dulcidius (Dulcet, Doucis), successor of St Phoebadius as Bishop of Agen in France (c. 450)
- 220 Martyrs of North-West Africa. (Note: "IN Africa, two hundred and seventy holy martyrs crowned together.")
- Martys Saturninus, Nereus and Companions, a group of some 365 martyrs who suffered in North Africa under the Vandal King Genseric (450) (Note: "Also, the Saints Saturninus, Nereus, and three hundred and sixty-five other martyrs.")
- Martyrs Martinian, Saturian and Companions, under Genseric in North Africa (458) (Note: Four brothers, reduced to slavery in the house of an Arian Vandal in Mauretania in North Africa. The four brothers were martyred under Genseric by being dragged by horses.) (Note: "In the same country, the Saints Martinian and Saturnian with their two brothers. In the reign of the Arian king Genseric, while the persecution of the Vandals was raging, they were slaves belonging to a man of that race, and being converted to the faith of Christ by Maxima, a slave like themselves, they manifested their attachment to the truth with such courage, that they were beaten with rough clubs and lacerated in all parts of their bodies to the very bone. Although this barbarous treatment was continued for a considerable period, their wounds were each time healed over night, wherefore they were at length sent into exile. There they converted many barbarians to the faith, and obtained from the Roman Pontiff a priest and other ministers to baptize them. Finally they were condemned to die by being dragged through thorns, with their feet tied behind running chariots. Maxima being miraculously delivered after enduring many tribulations, became the Superioress of a large monastery of virgins, where she ended her days in peace.")
- Saint Conogan, the successor of St Corentin as Bishop of Quimper in Brittany (460)
- Saint Junian, a hermit in Commodoliacus (now Saint-Junien), near Limoges in France (5th century)
- Saint Gallus, monk of Bangor Monastery and Enlightener of Switzerland (c. 646) (Note: A monk at Bangor in Ireland, he accompanied St Columbanus to France where he helped found Luxeuil. He was exiled and settled in Switzerland where the monastery and town of Saint Gall later grew up. He is venerated as one of the Apostles of Switzerland.) (Note: "At Arbon, in Switzerland, St. Gall, abbot, disciple of blessed Columban.")
- Saint Magnobodus (Mainboeuf), Bishop of Angers in France (c. 670)
- Saint Baldwin (Baudoin), martyr (c. 680) (Note: Son of St Salaberga and brother of St Anstrude, Abbess of Laon in France. He was murdered, which led to his veneration as a martyr.)
- Saint Mummolin (Mommolinus), Bishop of Noyon-Tournai in Belgium (c. 686) (Note: Born in Constance in Switzerland, he became a monk at Luxeuil in France and was eventually sent to St Omer and made Abbot of the Old Monastery (now Saint Mommolin). From there he became Abbot of Sithin, founded by his friend St Bertinus. Finally in 660 he was made Bishop of Noyon-Tournai in Belgium.)
- Saint Bercharius, a monk at Luxeuil Abbey and first Abbot of Hautvillers and martyr (696) (Note: St Bercharius founded two monasteries, Moutier-en-Der for monks, and Puellemoutier for nuns. He was fatally stabbed by an evildoer and died forgiving his murderer. He was venerated as a martyr.)
- Saint Balderic (Baudry), children of Sigebert I, King of Austrasia (7th century) (Note: He and his sister, St Bova, were children of Sigebert I, King of Austrasia in the east of France. He founded the monastery of Montfaucon and a convent in Rheims where his sister became a nun.)
- Saint Eremberta, niece of St Wulmar and first Abbess of Wierre in France (late 7th century)
- Saint Vitalis (Vial), Hermit, Confessor (740) (Note: Born in England, he became a monk at Noirmoutier in France and afterwards a hermit on Mt Scobrit near the Loire.)
- Saint Ambrose, thirteenth Bishop of Cahors in France (c. 752) (Note: He later lived as a hermit. After a pilgrimage to Rome, he reposed at what is now called Saint-Ambroise-sur-Arnon in Berry.: See: (in French) Abbaye Saint-Ambroix. Wikipédia. (French Wikipedia).)
- Saint Lullus, the first permanent Archbishop of Mainz, succeeding Saint Boniface, Confessor (787) (Note: A monk at Malmesbury Abbey in England and a relative of St Boniface, he went to Germany and in 751 St Boniface consecrated him bishop. After his master's martyrdom he took his place. He founded several monasteries.)

== Post-Schism Orthodox saints ==
- Saint Eupraxia, Abbess, before tonsure Princess Euphrosyne of Pskov (1243) (Note: See: (in Russian) Евпраксия Псковская. Википе́дия. (Russian Wikipedia).)
- Venerable Longinus the Gate-keeper of the Kiev Caves (13th–14th centuries)
- Venerables John and Longinus of Yarenga, monks of Solovetsky Monastery (1544–45 or 1569) (see also: July 3)
- New Martyr John of Tourkolekas (1816)
- Blessed Domna (Slipchenko) of Tomsk, Fool-for-Christ, of Tomsk (1872) (Note: See: (in Russian) Домна Томская. Википе́дия. (Russian Wikipedia).)

=== New Martys and Confessors ===
- Saint George Troitsky, Confessor, Priest (1931)
- New Hieromartyr Eugene Yelkhovsky, Priest (1937)
- New Hieromartyr Alexei Nikonov, Priest (1938)
- New Hieromartyr John Zasyedatelev, Priest (1942)

== Other commemorations ==
- Repose of Patriarch Adrian of Moscow (1700)
- Repose of Abbot Neonil of Neamț Monastery, Romania (1853)

== Icon gallery ==
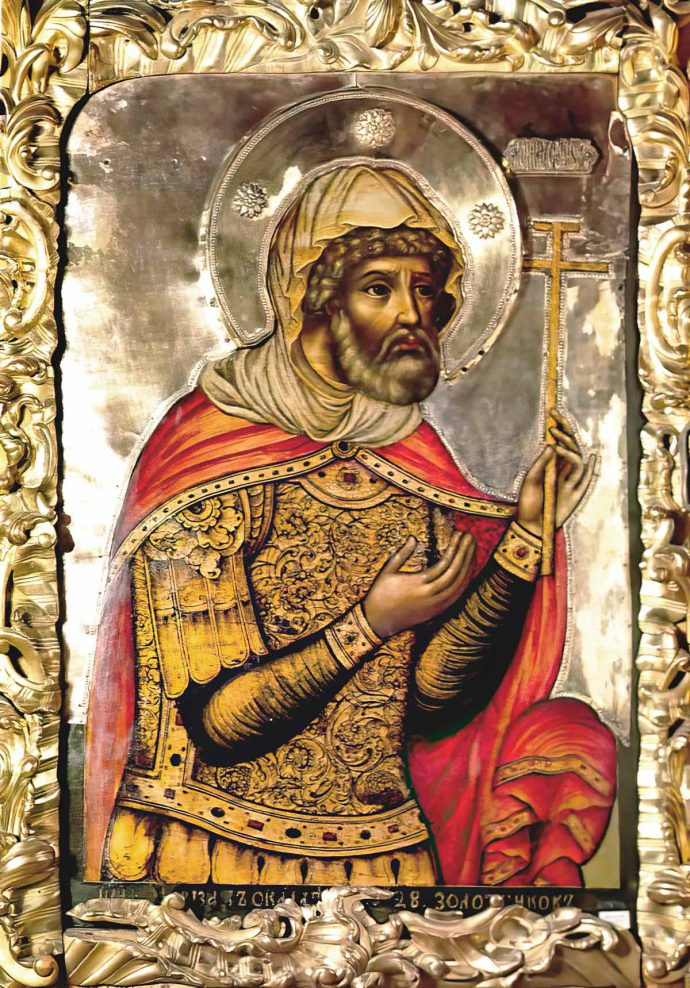
Martyr Longinus the Centurion.

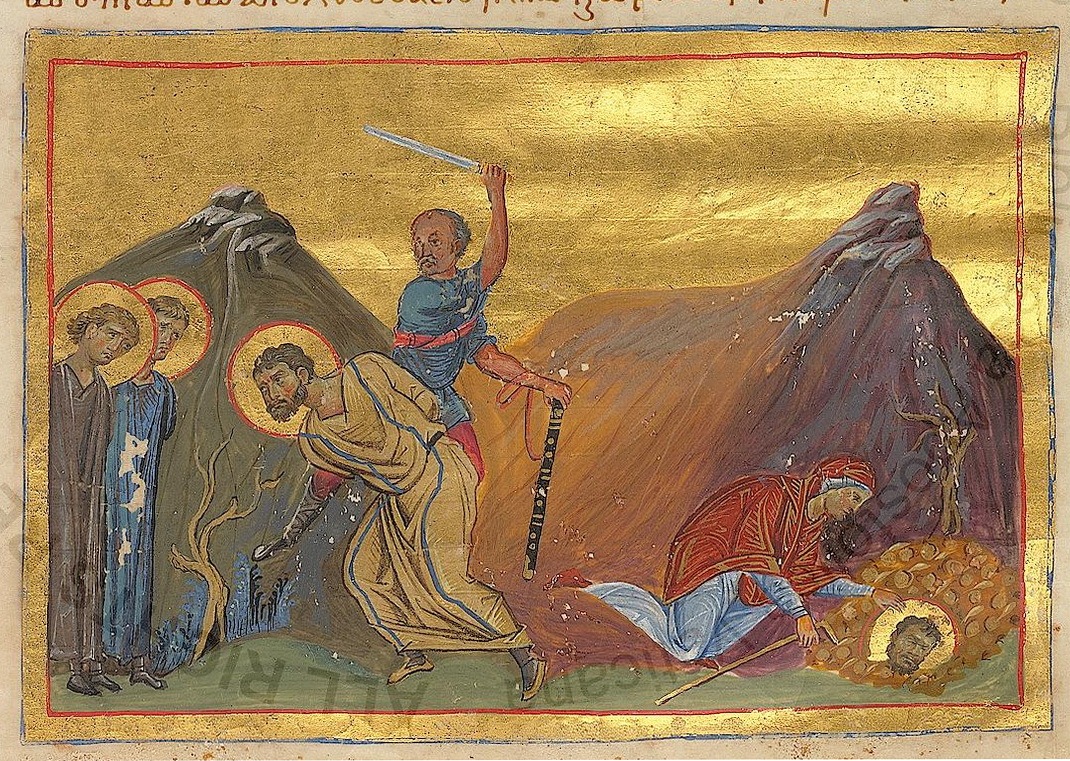
Martyr Longinus the Centurion.
(Menologion of Basil II, 10th century).

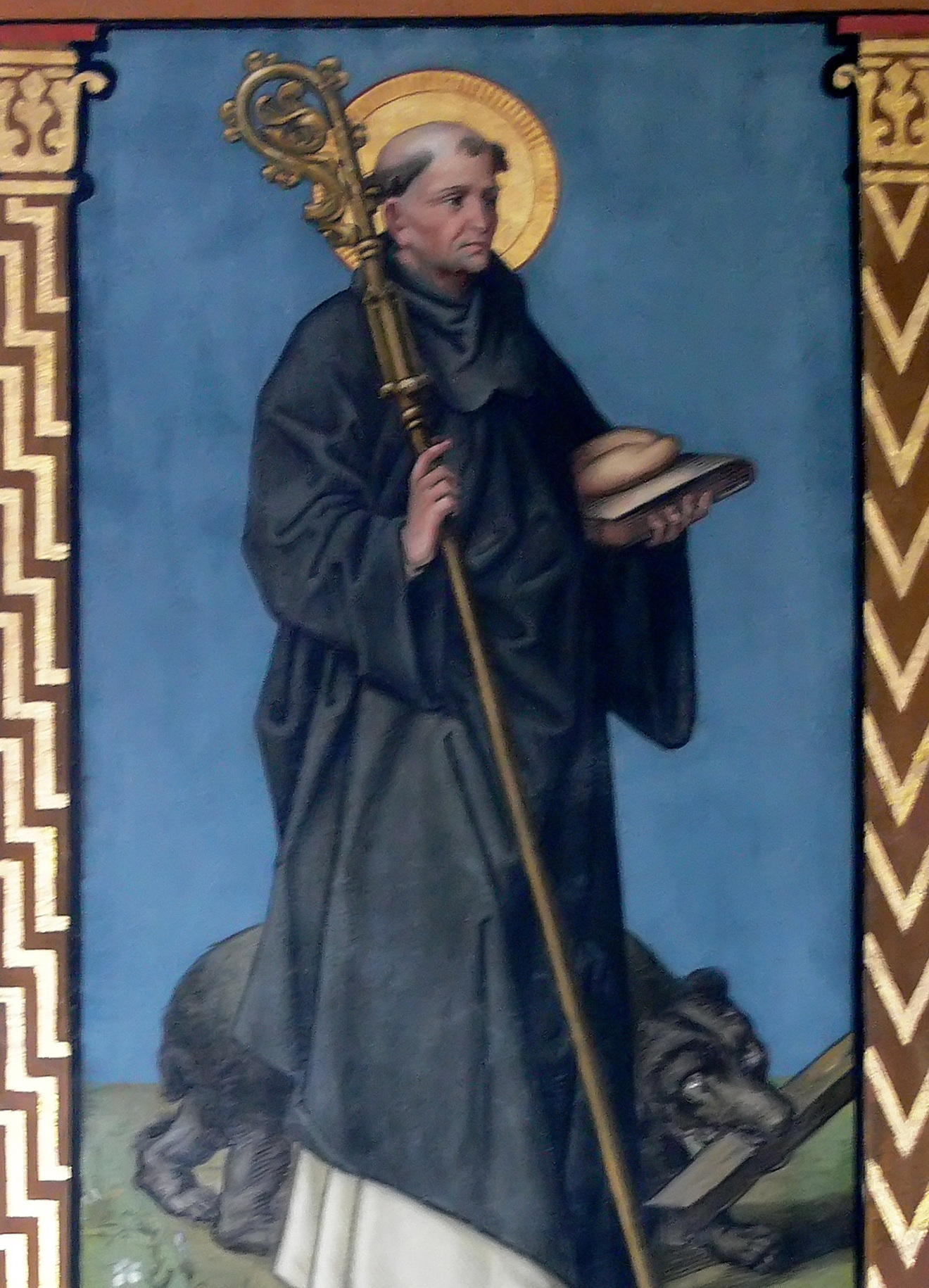
St. Gallus, monk of Bangor Monastery and Enlightener of Switzerland.

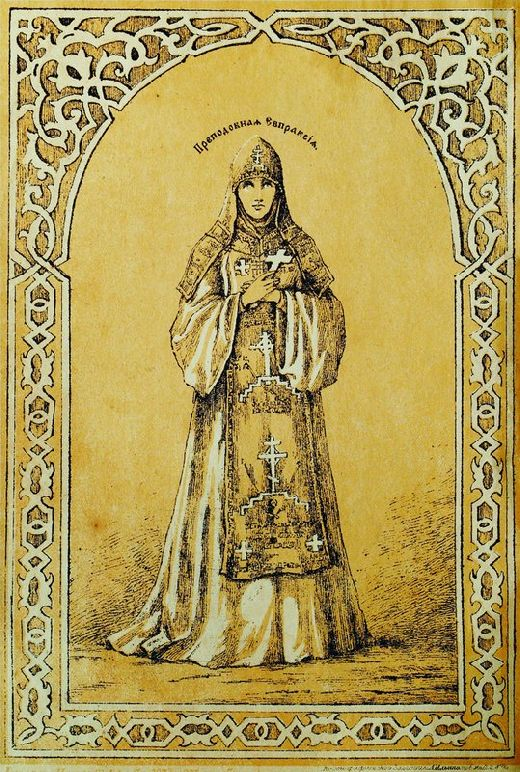
St Eupraxia of Pskov, Abbess.

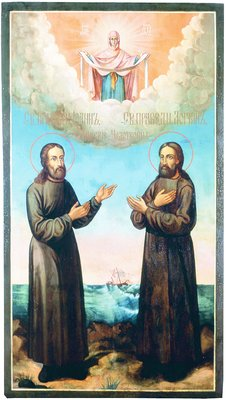
Sts. John and Longinus of Yarenga, monks of Solovetsky Monastery.

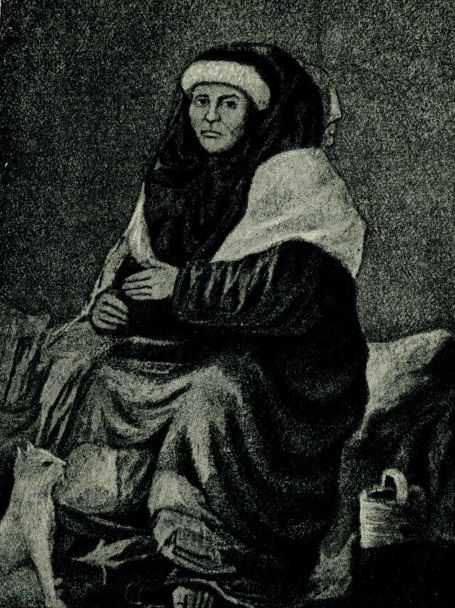
St. Domna (Slipchenko) of Tomsk.

== Sources ==
- October 16/29. Orthodox Calendar (PRAVOSLAVIE.RU).
- October 29 / October 16. HOLY TRINITY RUSSIAN ORTHODOX CHURCH (A parish of the Patriarchate of Moscow).
- October 16. OCA - The Lives of the Saints.
- The Autonomous Orthodox Metropolia of Western Europe and the Americas (ROCOR). St. Hilarion Calendar of Saints for the year of our Lord 2004. St. Hilarion Press (Austin, TX). p. 77.
- The Sixteenth Day of the Month of October. Orthodoxy in China.
- October 16. Latin Saints of the Orthodox Patriarchate of Rome.
- The Roman Martyrology. Transl. by the Archbishop of Baltimore. Last Edition, According to the Copy Printed at Rome in 1914. Revised Edition, with the Imprimatur of His Eminence Cardinal Gibbons. Baltimore: John Murphy Company, 1916. pp. 319–320.
- Rev. Richard Stanton. A Menology of England and Wales, or, Brief Memorials of the Ancient British and English Saints Arranged According to the Calendar, Together with the Martyrs of the 16th and 17th Centuries. London: Burns & Oates, 1892. pp. 494–498.

Greek Sources

- Great Synaxaristes: (in Greek) 16 ΟΚΤΩΒΡΙΟΥ. ΜΕΓΑΣ ΣΥΝΑΞΑΡΙΣΤΗΣ.
- (in Greek) Συναξαριστής. 16 Οκτωβρίου. ECCLESIA.GR. (H ΕΚΚΛΗΣΙΑ ΤΗΣ ΕΛΛΑΔΟΣ).
- (in Greek) 16/10/2017. Ορθόδοξος Συναξαριστής.

Russian Sources

- (in Russian) 29 октября (16 октября). Православная Энциклопедия под редакцией Патриарха Московского и всея Руси Кирилла (электронная версия). (Orthodox Encyclopedia - Pravenc.ru).
- (in Russian) 16 октября по старому стилю / 29 октября по новому стилю. Русская Православная Церковь - Православный церковный календарь на 2016 год.
