= October 2 (Eastern Orthodox liturgics) =

Day in the Eastern Orthodox liturgical calendar

Eastern Orthodox liturgical calendar
October 1	October 2	October 3
October 2 O.S. ≍ October 15 N.S. October 2 N.S ≍ September 19 O.S.

An Eastern Orthodox cross

October 2 in Eastern Orthodox liturgical calendars is a feast day and a day of commemoration of saints and martyrs. Although some Orthodox churches use the Revised Julian Calendar and others use the traditional Julian calendar, the fixed commemorations for their respective October 2 are broadly the same, no matter which calendar is used. (Note: Despite the dates being the same, the days to which they refer typically differ by 13 days. The notation Old Style or O.S. is sometimes used to indicate a date in the traditional Julian Calendar (the "Old Calendar"). The notation New Style or N.S. indicates a date in the Revised Julian calendar (the "New Calendar").)

== Saints ==
- Saint Damaris of Athens (1st century) (see also: October 3)
- Hieromartyr Cyprian and Virgin-martyr Justina of Antioch, and with them Martyr Theoctistus of Nicomedia (304) (Note: Name days celebrated today include: Cyprian, Kiprianos (Κυπριανός); Justine, Ioustini (Ἰουστίνη).)
- Martyrs David and Constantine, Princes of Argveti, Georgia (740)
- Venerable Monk-Martyrs Michael, Abbot of Zovia Monastery near Sevastoupolis and 36 fathers with him, by beheading (c. 780) (see also: October 1)
- Venerable Theophilus the Confessor, under the iconoclasts (8th century) (Note: "At Constantinople, St. Theophilus, a monk, who was most cruelly scourged by Leo the Isaurian, for the defence of holy images, was driven into exile, and went gloriously to heaven.")
- Blessed Andrew, Fool-for-Christ, at Constantinople (936) (see also: May 28)

== Pre-Schism Western saints ==
- Saint Leudomer (Lomer), Bishop of Chartres in France (c. 585)
- Saint Gerinus (Garinus, Werinus), brother of St Leodegarius (Leger), persecuted by the tyrant Ebroin, stoned to death near Arras in the north of France (677) (Note: "Also, the holy martyr Gerinus, brother of the blessed Leodegarius, who was overwhelmed with stones in the same city.")
- Hieromartyr Leodegarius (Leger), Bishop of Autun, imprisoned, blinded and finally murdered by the tyrant Ebroin (679) (Note: Nephew of the Bishop of Poitiers in France, in 653 he became Abbot of St Maxentius. In 659 he became Bishop of Autun. His connection with the court brought on him the fury of the tyrant Ebroin who had the saint imprisoned, blinded and finally murdered.) (Note: "In the vicinity of Arras, the martyrdom of blessed Leodegarius, bishop of Autun. After being subjected to various insults and torments for the truth, he was put to death by Ebroin, chief minister of Theodoric.")
- Saint Beregisus, a priest who founded the monastery of Saint Hubert in the Ardennes in France (c. 725)
- Saint Ursicinus, Abbot of Disentis Abbey in Switzerland, he became Bishop of Chur in 754 (760)

== Post-Schism Orthodox saints ==
- Great-martyr Theodore Gabras of Atran in Chaldia, of Pontus (1098) (Note: The glorious great-martyr and brave athlete of the Lord Theodore Gavras or Theodore Gabras (Greek: Ὁ Ἅγιος Θεόδωρος ὁ Μεγαλομάρτυρας ὁ Γαβρᾶς, †1098), was a Byzanatine general who recaptured Trebizond from the Danishmend Turks in 1075 AD, and ruled it as the center of the Byzantine theme of Chaldia as a virtually autonomous state from 1081–1098. He fought with success against the Danishmend Turks and the Georgians, and later became a heroic figure in both Pontic Greek and Turkoman poetry. He was tortured and martyred in the region of Theodosiopolis (Erzurum) by the Danishmend Turks for refusing to convert to Islam, under one of the generals of Emir Danishmend Gazi, named Amir Ali (Amiralis, Amyrali).)
- Blessed Great Princess Anna of Kashin (Euphrosyne in monasticism) (1368) (see also: June 12, July 21)
- Saint Cassian the Greek, monk, of Uglich (1504) (Note: See: (in Russian) Кассиан Грек. Википедии. (Russian Wikipedia).)
- Blessed Cyprian of Suzdal, Fool-for-Christ and Wonderworker (1622)
- New Martyr Hadji-George of Philadelphia in Asia Minor, from Mount Athos (1794)
- Righteous Admiral Theodore Ushakov of the Russian Naval Fleet (1817)

=== New Martys and Confessors ===
- Virgin-martyr Alexandra Bulgakova (1938)

== Other commemorations ==
- Repose of Hieroschemamonk Theodosius of Karoulia, Mt. Athos (1937)
- Repose of Monk Roman the Soldier, of Valaam, martyred in Bosnia (1994)
- Repose of Schema-Archimandrite Alexander (Vasiliev) of the Pskov-Caves Monastery (1998)

== Icon gallery ==
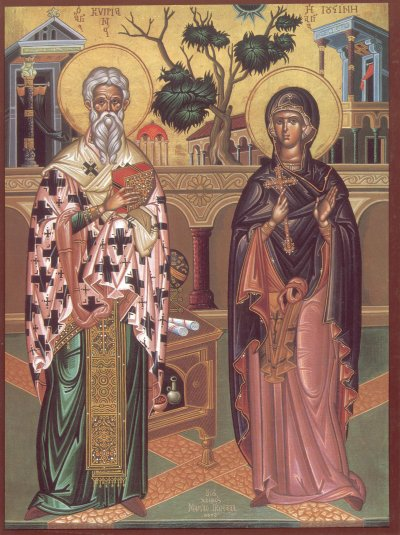
Hieromartyr Cyprian and Virgin-martyr Justina.

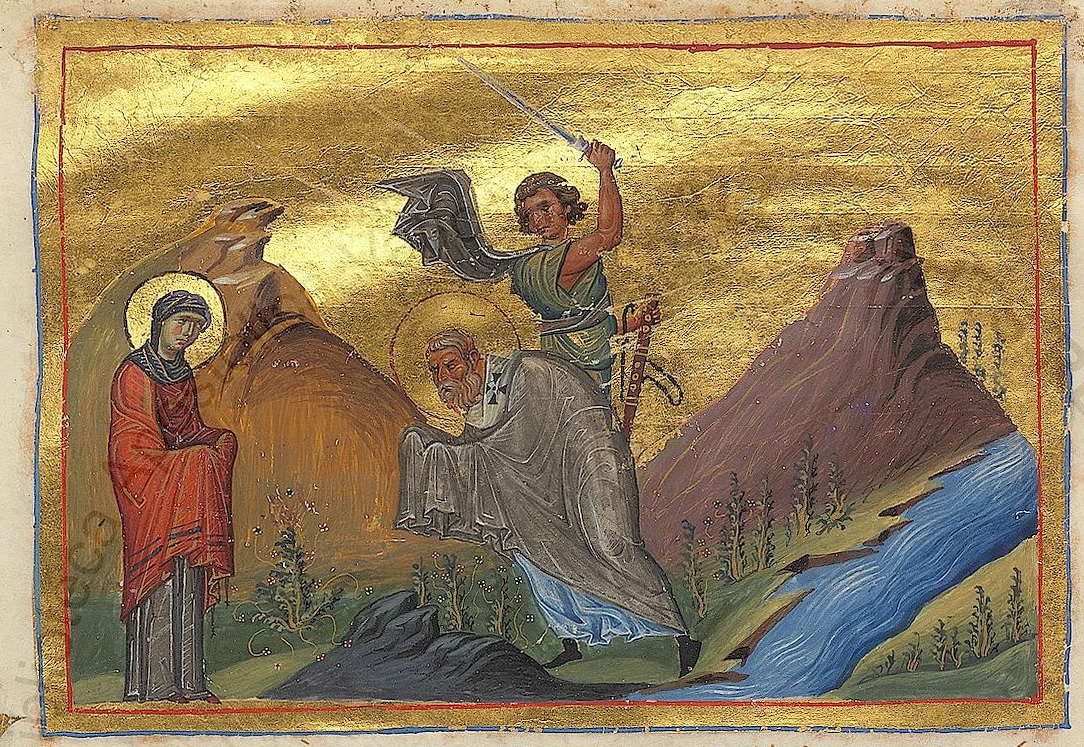
Hieromartyr Cyprian and Virgin-martyr Justina.
(Menologion of Basil II, 10th century).

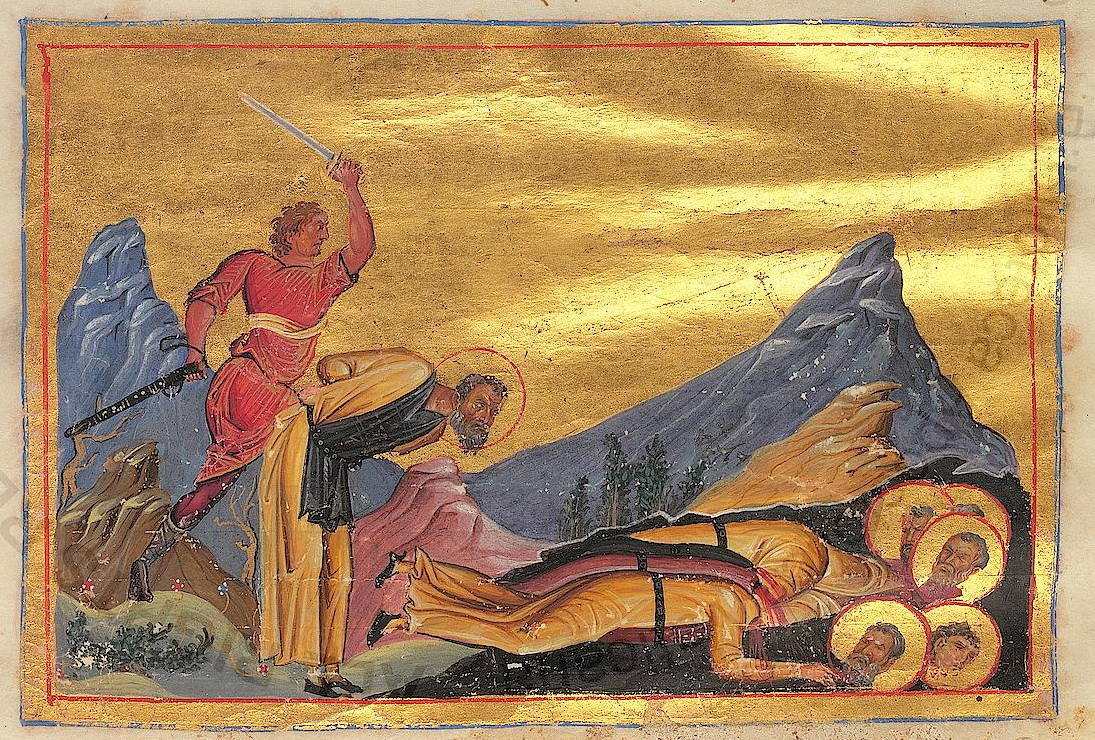
Monk-Martyrs Michael, Abbot of Zovia Monastery near Sebaste and 36 fathers with him.
(Menologion of Basil II, 10th century).

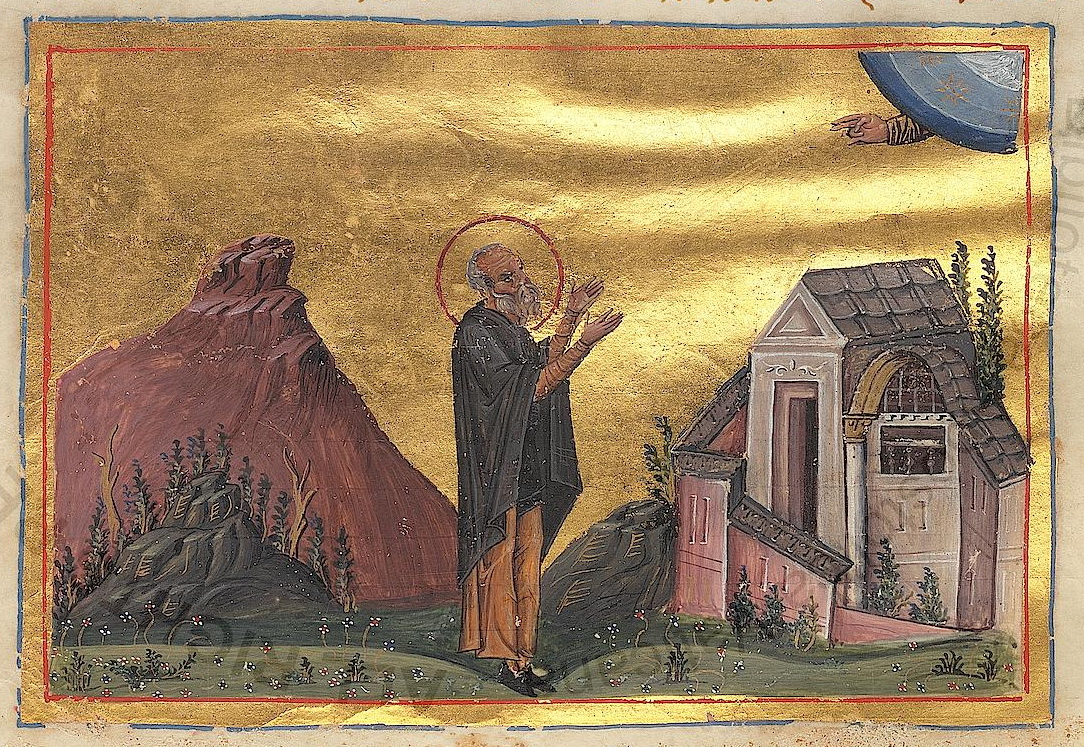
Venerable Theophilus the Confessor.
(Menologion of Basil II, 10th century).

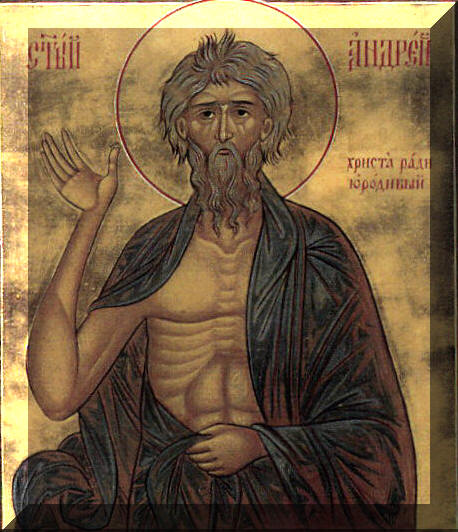
St. Andrew of Constantinople.

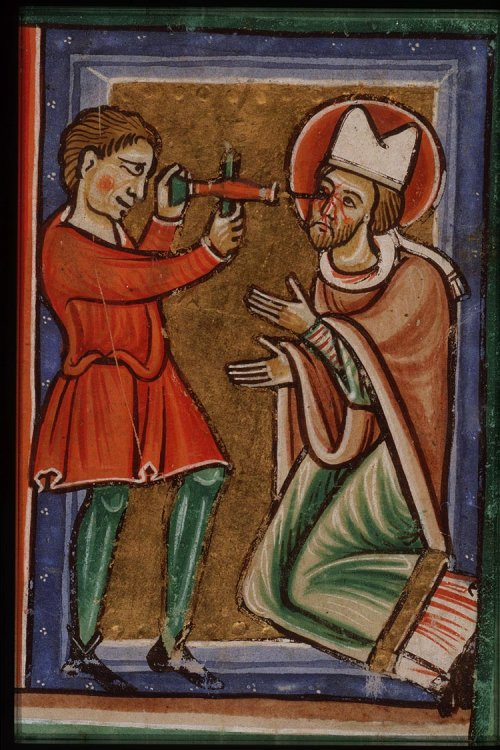
Hieromartyr Leodegarius, Bishop of Autun.

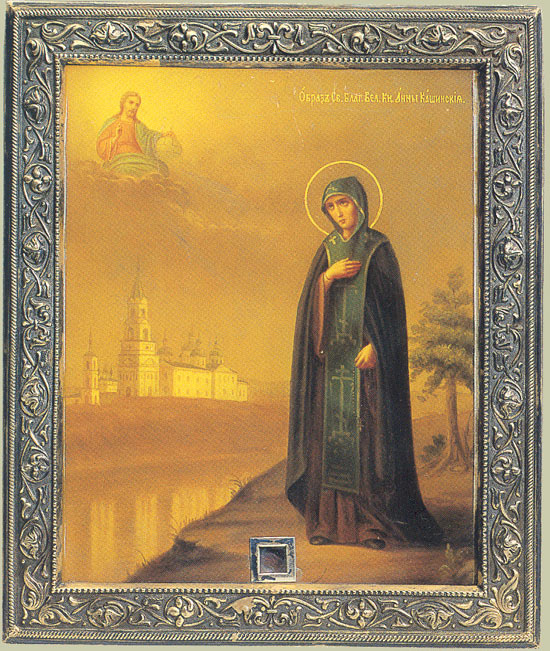
Blessed Great Princess Anna of Kashin (Euphrosyne in monasticism).

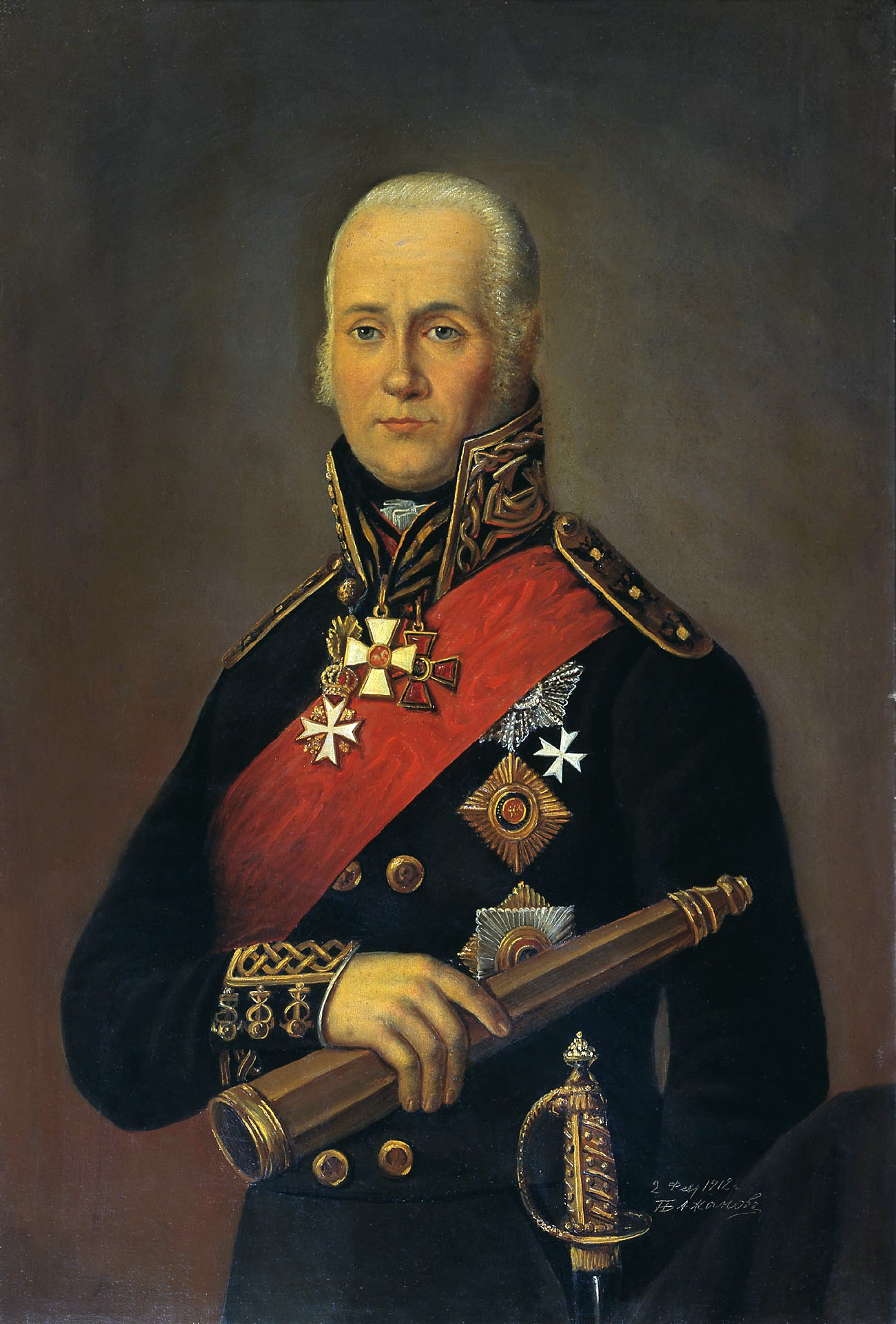
Righteous Admiral Theodore Ushakov.

== Sources ==
- October 2/15. Orthodox Calendar (PRAVOSLAVIE.RU).
- October 15 / October 2. HOLY TRINITY RUSSIAN ORTHODOX CHURCH (A parish of the Patriarchate of Moscow).
- October 2. OCA - The Lives of the Saints.
- The Autonomous Orthodox Metropolia of Western Europe and the Americas (ROCOR). St. Hilarion Calendar of Saints for the year of our Lord 2004. St. Hilarion Press (Austin, TX). p. 73.
- The Second Day of the Month of October. Orthodoxy in China.
- October 2. Latin Saints of the Orthodox Patriarchate of Rome.
- The Roman Martyrology. Transl. by the Archbishop of Baltimore. Last Edition, According to the Copy Printed at Rome in 1914. Revised Edition, with the Imprimatur of His Eminence Cardinal Gibbons. Baltimore: John Murphy Company, 1916. p. 304.
- Rev. Richard Stanton. A Menology of England and Wales, or, Brief Memorials of the Ancient British and English Saints Arranged According to the Calendar, Together with the Martyrs of the 16th and 17th Centuries. London: Burns & Oates, 1892. pp. 471–473.

Greek Sources

- Great Synaxaristes: (in Greek) 2 ΟΚΤΩΒΡΙΟΥ. ΜΕΓΑΣ ΣΥΝΑΞΑΡΙΣΤΗΣ.
- (in Greek) Συναξαριστής. 2 Οκτωβρίου. ECCLESIA.GR. (H ΕΚΚΛΗΣΙΑ ΤΗΣ ΕΛΛΑΔΟΣ).
- (in Greek) 02/10/2016. Ορθόδοξος Συναξαριστής.

Russian Sources

- (in Russian) 15 октября (2 октября). Православная Энциклопедия под редакцией Патриарха Московского и всея Руси Кирилла (электронная версия). (Orthodox Encyclopedia - Pravenc.ru).
- (in Russian) 2 октября по старому стилю / 15 октября по новому стилю. Русская Православная Церковь - Православный церковный календарь на 2018 год.
