= Troitse-Scanov Convent =

- ru:Троице-Сканов монастырь (Russian)
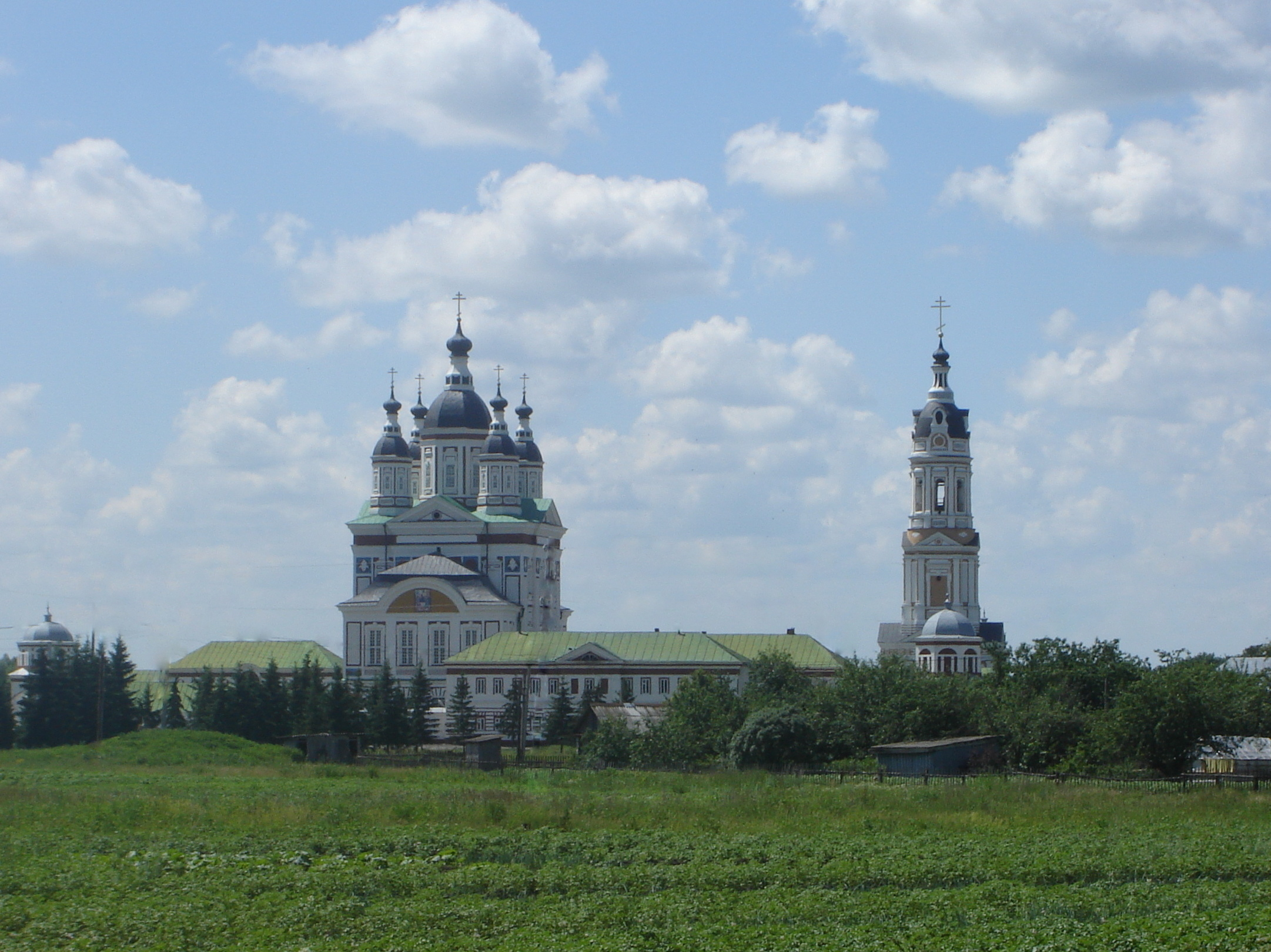

- Location within Russia
- 53.8667°N 43.759747°E
- Location: Penza Oblast, Russia

Troitse-Scanov Convent (Russian: Троице-Сканов монастырь) is a Convent in the Penza Oblast of Russia. It is located 4 km (2.5 mi) from the district center Narovchat. Its architecture demonstrates the transition from baroque to classicism.

== History ==
Troitse-Scanov Convent was founded in the middle of the 17th century as a monastery. The word Troitse is the Russian word Троица (Holy Trinity). The word Scanov came from a river Skanova that allegedly flowed near the monastery.

On April 26, 1676 а strong fire destroyed all the wooden buildings of the monastery. After the fire two churches were built on the site: a new wooden church of the Holy Trinity which endured until the fire in 1785, and the church of St. Nicholas, which was demolished in 1802 due to dilapidation of the bell tower. In 1795, a new brick two-story five-domed cathedral with outdoor painting was built at this place. The first builder of the new church was abbot monk Arseniy I, and after his death - Abbot Cornelius. The church was painted by a cathedral priest named Parfentiev. He also painted the icons for the cathedral. On the ground floor of the church, the throne of the Dormition of the Mother of God was placed. It was consecrated by Abbot-builder Cornelius on October 8, 1801. On the upper floor a throne of the Trinity was located. It was consecrated by Abbot Archimandrite Israel on May 29, 1808. numerous residences, offices and outbuildings were built around the church. After 1917 the monastery was closed.

== Cave monastery ==
A cave monastery, dug by the monks in the mountain is located 1.5 km (0.93 mi) from Troitse-Scanov Convent. It has three-level underground paths with the little rooms around. The founder of the cave monastery was Arseny II, who retired to the cave in 1826. In 1866-1880 a five-domed stone church was built on the mountain. After closing the cave monastery in 1917 the buildings were destroyed. The remaining underground paths are about 600 meters (2,000 ft), out of the original total of 2.5 km (1.6 mi). A staircase of 144 steps leads to the cave complex.

== Revival ==
In 1985 the buildings were transferred to the Russian Orthodox Church and the monastery has resumed its activities as a convent. At one time it housed 70 nuns and 10 children. On April 12, 1990 the first service after the break took place, and in October 1999 the Patriarch of Moscow and All Russia, Alexy I, visited the convent. The most highly revered shrine of the convent is the icon of the Mother of God, called "Trubchevsk" which was painted by the monk Euthymius in Chelnsky Monastery in 1765. (Chelnsky Monastery is in the town of Trubchevsk in the Bryansk region)

== See also ==
- The information on tourist objects in a cut of 26 areas of the Penza region and Penza.
