= Peter of Capitolias =

8th-century Christian saint

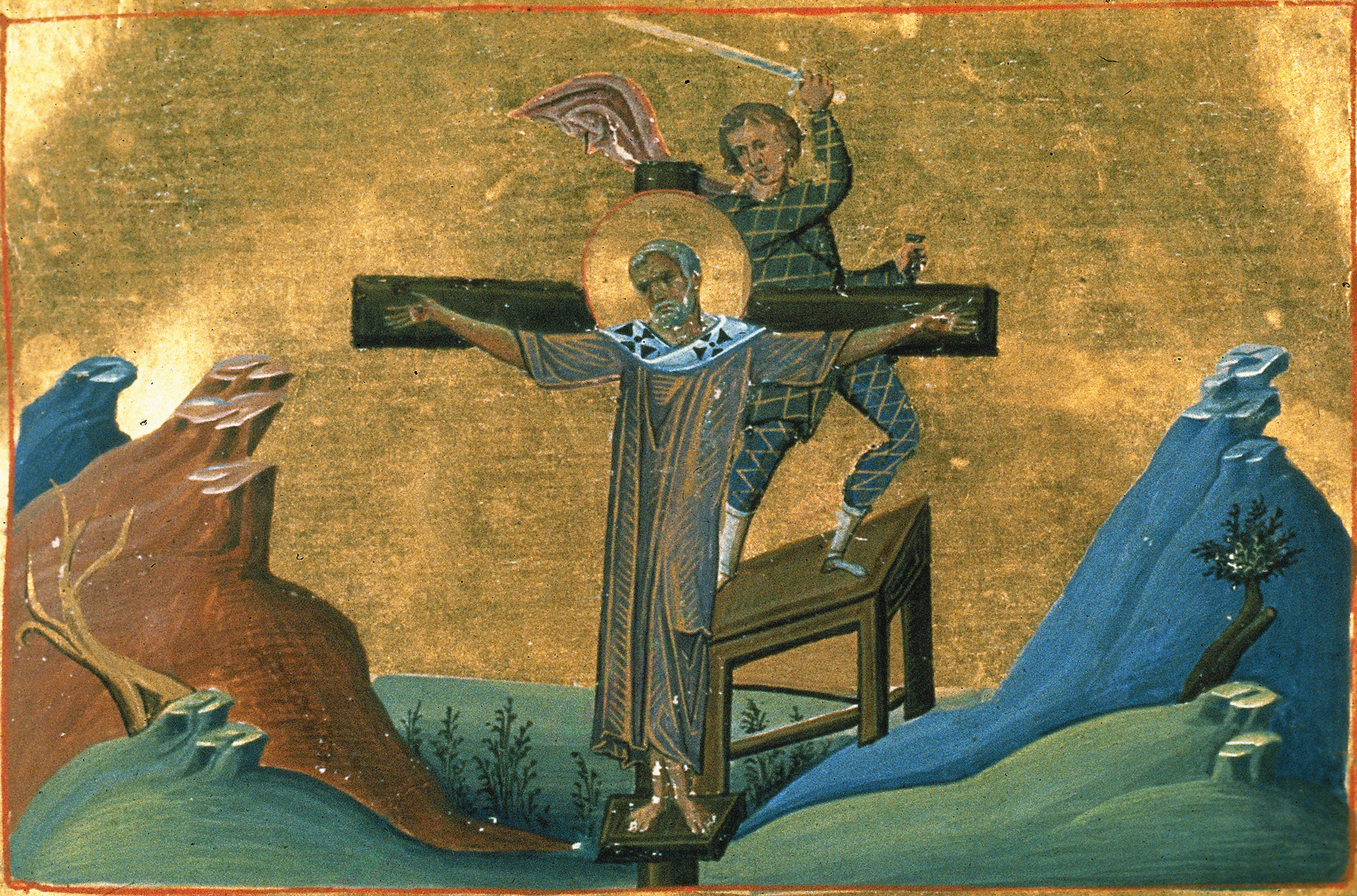

Peter of Capitolias was an 8th-century Christian saint. He was born in Capitolias, in what is today Jordan, married and became the father of three children. After the death of his wife, he became a monk and, according to some traditions, was later consecrated bishop of Bosra.

He was executed by stoning in Bosra for criticizing Islam. His feast day is January 13 or October 4. Before his execution, he was successively interrogated by the governor of the Jund al-Urdunn district, Umar ibn al-Walid, his deputy Zur'a and finally Caliph al-Walid I (r. 705–715).

The Passion of Peter of Capitolias, a hagiographic account of his martyrdom, is known from a single Old Georgian manuscript copied at the Gelati Monastery in 1565. The Georgian text with a Russian translation was published by Korneli Kekelidze in 1915. A French summary by Paul Peeters appeared in 1939 and an English translation by Stephen J. Shoemaker in 2016.

The Passion is attributed to "John, monk and priest of Damascus", which may refer to John of Damascus, as Kekelidze thought. Theophanes the Confessor confirms that John wrote hagiography, including an account of Peter of Capitolias, during his retirement in Mar Saba.
