= Helladius of Kiev =

Ukrainian monk and saint

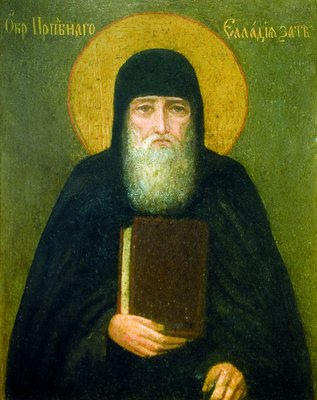

Helladius of Kiev was a monk and saint. His feast day at the Kyiv Caves monastery is on the Saturday after 14 September.
