= Aurea of Paris =

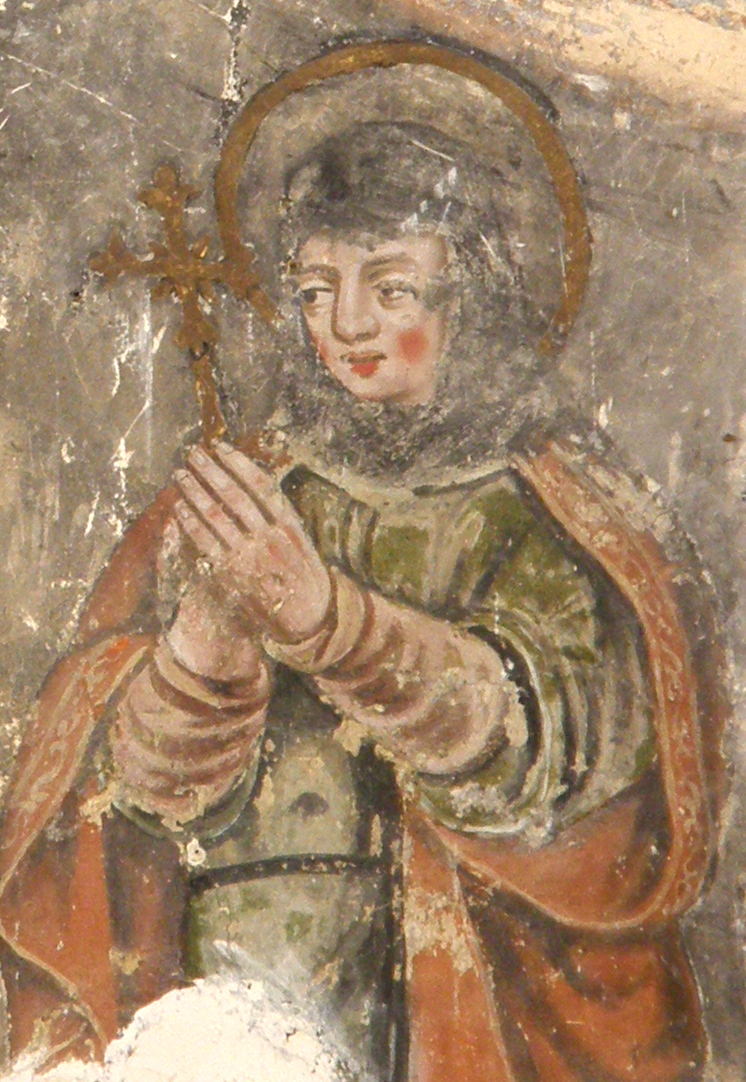
- Died: 666
- Cause of death: Plague
- Feast: October 4 (Orthodox Church) October 5 (Catholic Church)

Aurea of Paris (died 666; French: Sainte Aure), venerated as Saint Aurea of Paris, was an abbess of Saint Martial in Paris in the seventh century. Dagobert I and Clovis II ruled at the time. Her feast day before the Great East-West Schism of 1054 was universally 4 October, and remains so in the Orthodox Church. The Catholic celebration of her feast was transferred to 5 October following their veneration of St Francis of Assisi.

== Narrative ==
She appears in works by two writers, St Ouen and Jonas of Bobbio, in their hagiography (saint's life stories) of St Eligius and St Eustace. Both writers state that she was an immigrant to Paris from Syria.

When around 632 Eligius, by the liberality of King Dagobert, settled at Paris a nunnery of three hundred virgins, he appointed Aurea abbess. She died "with one hundred and sixty of her sisters" of the plague in 666.

Aurea's relics are held at the church of St Eloi in Paris. In the same church, there is also a mural of her receiving the veil from St Eloi.

== Veneration ==
As her nunnery stood within the city she could not be buried there, and she was therefore interred at St. Paul's, some time after, her bones were taken up, and kept in a rich shrine in that church, until they were translated to her monastery.

Aurea was believed to have brought a woman back to life, so that she could release a key from her dead hands; to have swept red-hot ashes out of an empty oven, seemingly causing well-baked loaves to appear; and, long after death, to have cured a blind woman with the touch of her cut-off (and freshly bleeding) arm.
