= January 15 (Eastern Orthodox liturgics) =

Day in the Eastern Orthodox liturgical calendar

Eastern Orthodox liturgical calendar
January 14	January 15	January 16
January 15 O.S. ≍ January 28 N.S. January 15 N.S ≍ January 2 O.S.

An Eastern Orthodox cross

January 15 in Eastern Orthodox liturgical calendars is a feast day and a day of commemoration of saints and martyrs. Although some Orthodox churches use the Revised Julian Calendar and others use the traditional Julian calendar, the fixed commemorations for their respective January 15 are broadly the same, no matter which calendar is used. (Note: Despite the dates being the same, the days to which they refer typically differ by 13 days. The notation Old Style or O.S. is sometimes used to indicate a date in the traditional Julian Calendar (the "Old Calendar"). The notation New Style or N.S, indicates a date in the Revised Julian calendar (the "New Calendar").)

== Saints ==
- Venerable Martyr Pansophius of Alexandria (c. 250)
- Martyrs Elpidios, Danax, and Helen. (see also: January 16)
- Virgin Martyr Charitina of Amisus (c. 304) (see also: September 4, October 5) (Note: Present in Menologium Basilii, Menaea Sirmundii and Menologium Sirleti.)
- Venerable Paul of Thebes, Egypt (341)
- Holy 6 Monk-Martyrs of the Desert, who reposed peacefully. (see also: January 4)
- Saints Salome of Ujarma and Perozhavra of Sivnia, Georgia (c. 361) (Note: Venerable Salome, along with St. Perozhavra of Sivnia, a noblewoman who was married to the ruler of the Kartli region, were the helpers and closest companions of Saint Nino, Equal-to-the-Apostles and Enlightener of Georgia (335).)
- Saint Isidore of Scété (died c. 390), Egyptian priest and desert ascetic.
- Venerable Alexander the Ever-Vigilant, founder of the Monastery of the Unsleeping Ones ("the Ever-Vigilant"), at Gomon, (Note: The region of Gomon in north-eastern Bithynia, historically the site of the Monastery of the Unsleeping Ones, probably corresponds to a site that is in either the modern-day Sakarya Province, or Düzce Province, of Turkey, along the southern coast of the Black Sea.) in north-eastern Bithynia (c. 426-427) (Note: The Venerable Saint Alexander was essentially the founder of the Monastery of the Unsleeping Ones ("the Ever-Vigilant" - Grk: Μονὴ Ἀκοιμήτων). This is how the monks of the East were called, who lived communally and were divided into groups, commemorating God in succession perpetually throughout the day and night, so that unceasing prayer would never cease in their monastery. (See also: December 29 for another Saint commemorated from this monaster, called Venerable Marcellus, Abbot of the Monastery of the Unsleeping Ones ("the Ever-Vigilant"), (485)).) (see also: February 23; July 3)
- Venerable John Calybite (Calabytes) "the Hut-Dweller" of Constantinople, Monk (c. 450)

== Pre-Schism Western saints ==
- Virgin Martyr Secundina, scourged to death near Rome in the persecution of Decius (c. 250) (Note: "At Anagni, St. Secundina, virgin and martyr, who suffered under the emperor Decius.")
- Martyr Ephysius of Sardinia (303) (Note: "At Cagliari, in Sardinia, St. Ephisius, martyr, who, in the persecution of Diocletian and under the judge Flavian, having, by the assistance of God, overcome many torments, was beheaded and ascended to heaven.")
- Saint Maximus, Bishop of Nola (c. 250) (Note: He ordained St Felix. During the persecution of Decius he fled to the mountains, where he nearly died of exposure and hunger. He reposed in Nola worn out by the hardships he had endured for the Faith.)
- Virgin Martyrs Maura and Britta of Touraine, France (4th century)
- Saint Eugippius, ordained priest at Rome, was biographer of Saint Severinus of Noricum (535)
- Saint Íte of Killeedy (Ita, Ytha, Meda), Hermitess in Ireland and foster-mother of Saint Brendan (570)
- Saint Maurus, disciple of Saint Benedict of Nursia (584) (Note: "In the diocese of Angers, St. Maur, abbot and disciple of St. Benedict. He made great progress with so able a master, for while he was still under the Saint's instruction he miraculously walked upon the water - a prodigy unheard of since the days of St. Peter. Sent later to France by St. Benedict, he built a famous monastery, which he governed for forty years, and after performing striking miracles, he rested in peace.")
- Saint Lleudadd (Laudatus), first Abbot of Bardsey Island, Wales (6th century)
- Saint Sawyl Penuchel, the father of Asaph of Wales (6th century)
- Saint Tarsicia of Rodez, an Anchoress who lived near Rodez, sister of St. Ferréol of Uzès (600)
- Saint Malard, Bishop of Chartres, present at the Council of Châlon-sur-Saône in 650 (c. 650)
- Saint Bonitus, Bishop of Clermont and Confessor, later a monk (c. 710)
- Saint Emebert, an early Bishop of Cambrai (c. 710)
- Saint Ceolwulf, King of Northumbria, encouraged monastic life (764) (Note: St Bede dedicated his Ecclesiastical History to him. He ended his days as a monk at Lindisfarne.) (Note: "The fervent piety of Ceolwulf led him to seek the means of greater perfection in the religious state, and after governing his people a few years, he took refuge at Lindisfarne. There he led a holy life for many years, an example of true contempt for the vanities of the world. Eventually his relics were taken to the Church of Norham, and the translation was marked by many miracles.")
- Saint Blaithmaic (Blathmac), an Abbot from Ireland, went to Scotland and was martyred by the Danes on the altar steps of the church of Iona (c. 823)

== Post-Schism Orthodox saints ==
- Venerable Prohor (Prochorus), Abbot in the Vranski Desert on the River Pčinja (Pchinja, Pshina), Bulgaria (10th-11th century) (see also: October 19)
- Venerable Gabriel of Lesnovo, Founder of Lesnovo Monastery, Serbia-Bulgaria (980 or 11th or 12th century)
- Saint Nectarius, Archbishop of Tobolsk (1667)

=== New martyrs and confessors ===
- New Hieromartyr Benjamin, Bishop of Romanov (1930)
- New Hieromartyr Michael Samsonov, Priest (1942)

== Other commemorations ==
- Finding of the relics (1722) of Venerable Barlaam (Varlaam) of Keret Lake (Keretsky) near the White Sea (1589-1590) (see also: November 6)
- Restoration (1998) of Saint Nektarios of Aegina as Metropolitan of Pentapolis. (Note: On January 15, 1998, under Patriarch Petros VII of Alexandria, the restoration of the Holy and God-bearing Father took place after being expelled from the Alexandrian Church, and so in the Alexandrian Patriarchal Synod on this day it was announced: "With great care the Holy and Sacred Synod, bends down with the fear of God and before the icon of the Saint found in the Synodal Hall, and we declare the restoration to canonical order and beseech forgiveness from our Holy Father Nektarios for the persecution and unjust wrath against him, by the spiteful influence of the evil one.") (see also: November 9)

== Icon gallery ==
Venerable Martyr Pansophius of Alexandria.
(Menologion of Basil II, 10th century).

Virgin martyr Charitina of Amisus, tortured with burning coals.
(Menologion of Basil II, 10th century).

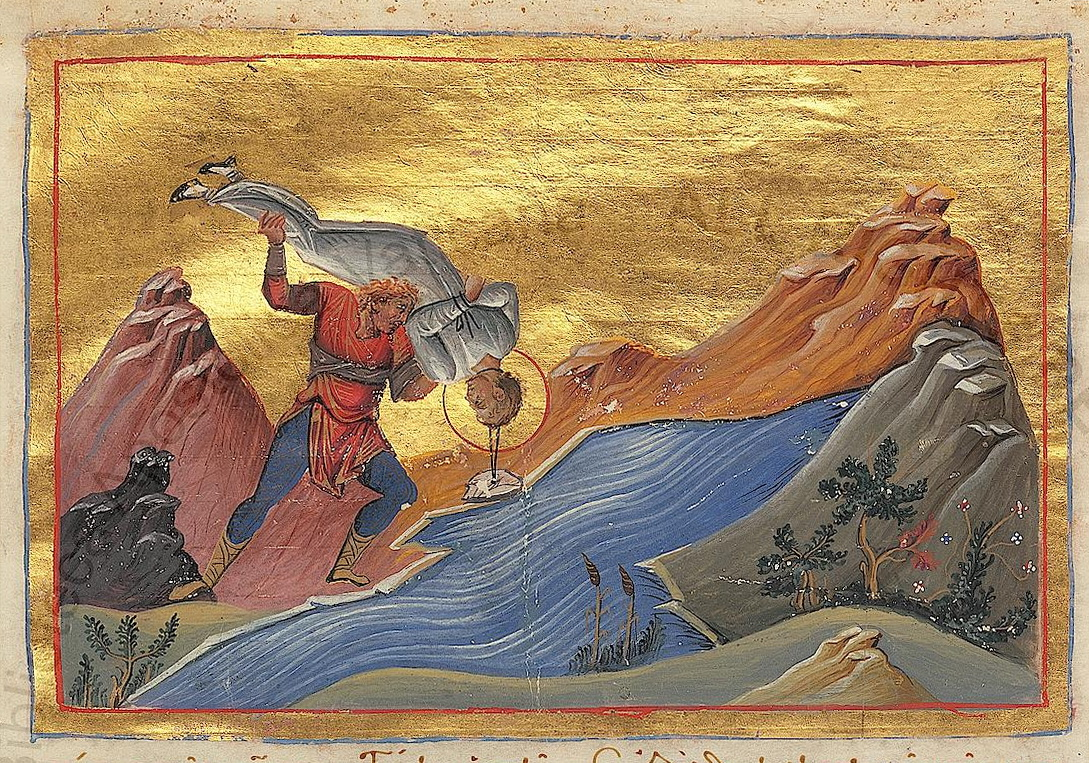
Virgin martyr Charitina of Amisus, thrown into the sea.
(Menologion of Basil II, 10th century).

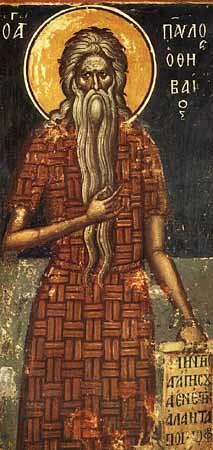
Venerable Paul of Thebes.

St. Anthony the Great with the body of Venerable Paul of Thebes.
(Menologion of Basil II, 10th century).

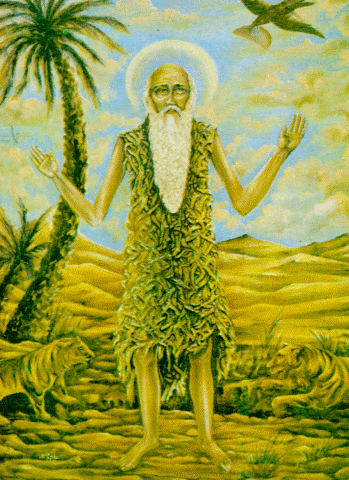
Venerable Paul of Thebes. The 2 lions helped St. Anthony to bury Saint Paul after death.

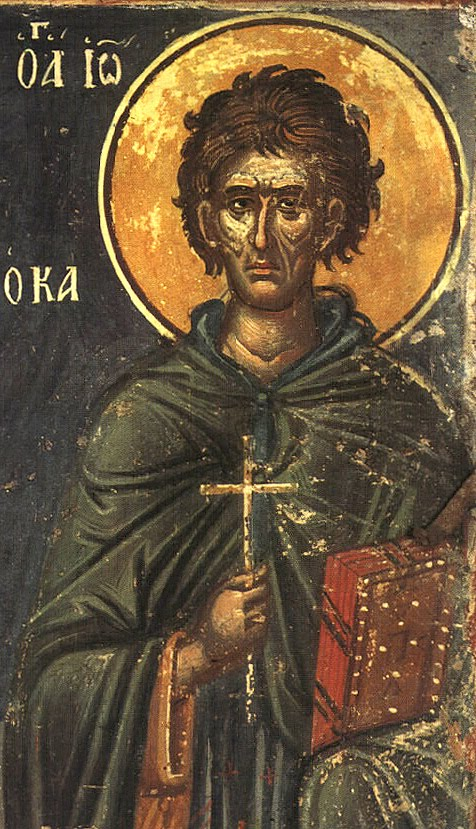
Athonite Fresco of St. John Calabytes, "the Hut-Dweller" of Constantinople.

St. John Calabytes.
(Menologion of Basil II, 10th century).

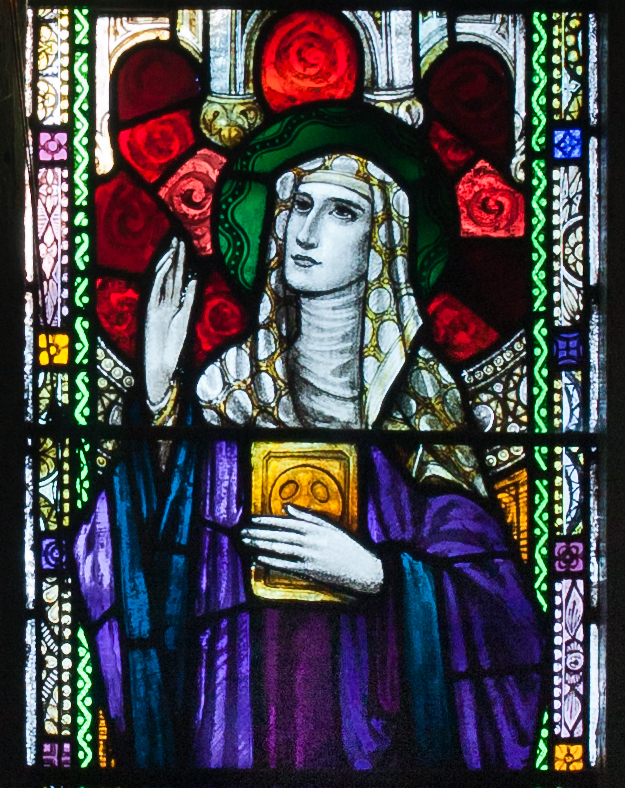
Saint Íte of Killeedy.
(Church of Our Lady and St. Kieran, Ballylooby, County Tipperary, Ireland).

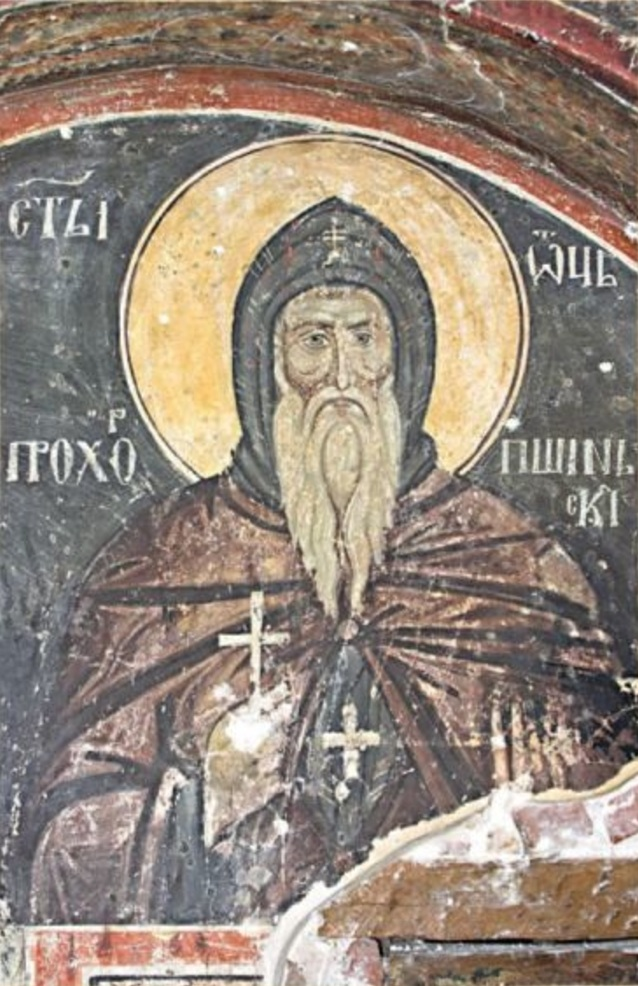
Venerable Prochorus, Abbot in the Vranski Desert on the River Pčinja.

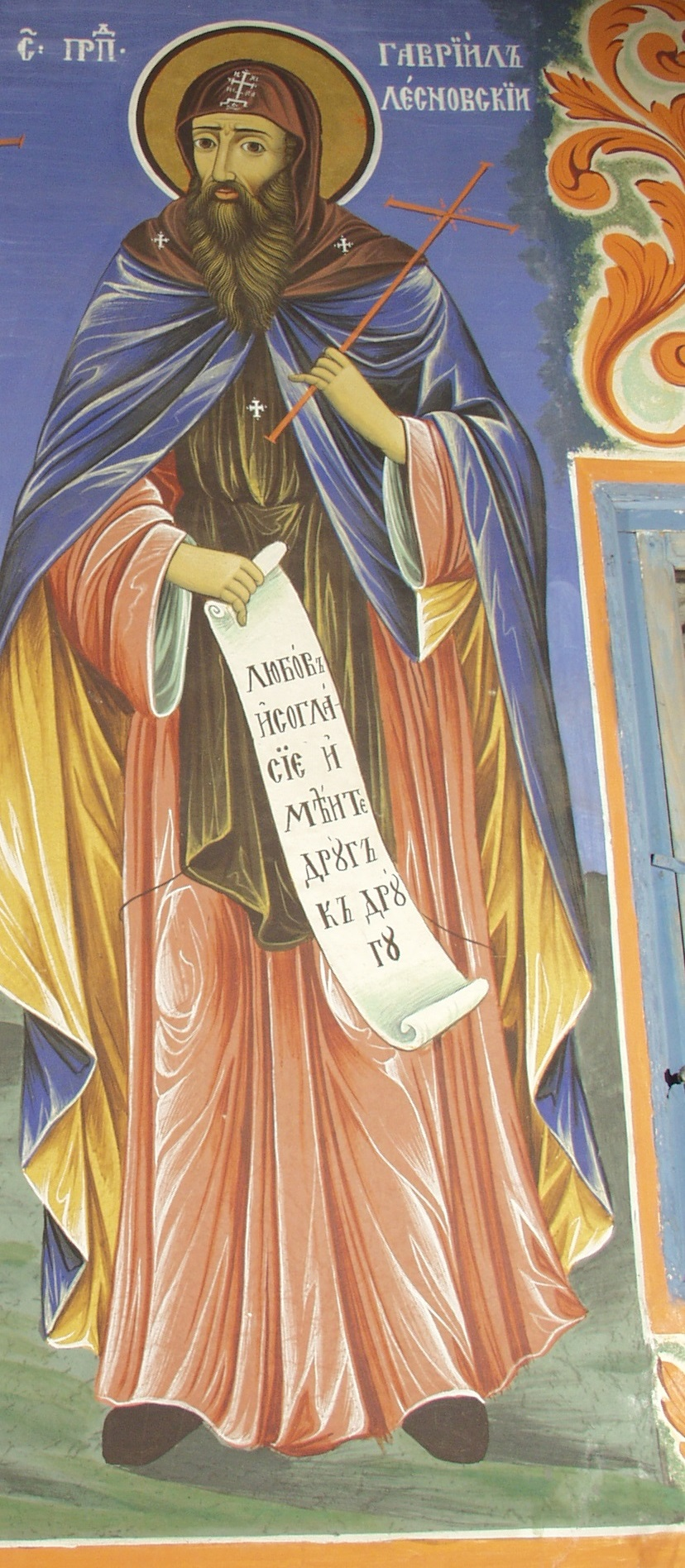
Venerable Gabriel, Founder of Lesnovo Monastery.

== Sources ==
- January 15/January 28. Orthodox Calendar (PRAVOSLAVIE.RU).
- January 28 / January 15. HOLY TRINITY RUSSIAN ORTHODOX CHURCH (A parish of the Patriarchate of Moscow).
- January 15. OCA - The Lives of the Saints.
- The Autonomous Orthodox Metropolia of Western Europe and the Americas (ROCOR). St. Hilarion Calendar of Saints for the year of our Lord 2004. St. Hilarion Press (Austin, TX). pp. 7–8.
- January 15. Latin Saints of the Orthodox Patriarchate of Rome.
- The Roman Martyrology. Transl. by the Archbishop of Baltimore. Last Edition, According to the Copy Printed at Rome in 1914. Revised Edition, with the Imprimatur of His Eminence Cardinal Gibbons. Baltimore: John Murphy Company, 1916. pp. 15–16.

Greek Sources

- Great Synaxaristes: (in Greek) 15 ΙΑΝΟΥΑΡΙΟΥ. ΜΕΓΑΣ ΣΥΝΑΞΑΡΙΣΤΗΣ.
- (in Greek) Συναξαριστής. 15 Ιανουαρίου. ECCLESIA.GR. (H ΕΚΚΛΗΣΙΑ ΤΗΣ ΕΛΛΑΔΟΣ).

Russian Sources

- (in Russian) 28 января (15 января). Православная Энциклопедия под редакцией Патриарха Московского и всея Руси Кирилла (электронная версия). (Orthodox Encyclopedia - Pravenc.ru).
- (in Russian) 15 января (ст.ст.) 28 января 2014 (нов. ст.). Русская Православная Церковь Отдел внешних церковных связей. (DECR).
