= October 5 =

October 5 this year in various calendars
- Monday, 5 October 2026
Akan	Kurudwo
Armenian	17 Sahmi 1476
Aztec	Izcalli 3, 9 Cōzcacuāuhtli
Babylonian	22 Ululu, 2337 SE
Balinese pawukon	Menga, Pasah, Laba, Keliwon, Paniron, Coma of Wayang, Brahma, Dangu, Suka
Bengali	20 Ashshin, BS 1433
Chinese	Yang Water Rat・Net Mansion; Fire Horse Year, Month 8, Day 25 (Qiufen, 3 days until Hanlu)
Common Era	5 October 2026 CE
Coptic	25 Thout, AM 1743
Egyptian	22 Mechir, 2775 NE
Ethiopian	25 Maskaram, 2019 Amätä Məhrät
French Republican	Décade II, Tridi de Vendémiaire de l'Année 235 de la République
Gregorian	5 October, AD 2026
Hebrew	24 Tishrei, AM 5787
Hindu	Puṣya・Śiva; Solar: 19 Āśvina, 1948 SE; Lunisolar: Daśamī, Kṛishna pakṣa of Bhādrapada, 2083 VE; Rāudra・5127 KY・1,872,853
Icelandic	Mánudagur, 12 Haustmánuður 2026
Islamic	22 Rabi' al-thani, AH 1448 (using tabular method)
ISO week date	2026-W41-1
Japanese	25 Hazuki, Reiwa 8 (Shūbun, 3 days until Kanro)
Julian	22 September, AD 2026 (AM 7534)
Julian day	2461319
Korean	25 Dakdal, 4359 DE
Maya	13.0.13.17.16; 9 Yax, 9 Cib
Roman	ante diem X Kalendas Octobres, MMDCCLXXIX AUC
Solar Hijri	13 Mehr, SH 1405
Tibetan	25 khrums, me pho rta 2153 or 1772 or 1000

<<	October					>>
Su	Mo	Tu	We	Th	Fr	Sa
				1	2	3
4	5	6	7	8	9	10
11	12	13	14	15	16	17
18	19	20	21	22	23	24
25	26	27	28	29	30	31
2026

October 5 in recent years
2026 (Monday)
2025 (Sunday)
2024 (Saturday)
2023 (Thursday)
2022 (Wednesday)
2021 (Tuesday)
2020 (Monday)
2019 (Saturday)
2018 (Friday)
2017 (Thursday)

October 5 is the 278th day of the year (279th in leap years) in the Gregorian calendar; 87 days remain until the end of the year.

== Events ==
=== Pre-1600 ===
- 610 – Heraclius arrives at Constantinople, kills Byzantine Emperor Phocas, and becomes emperor.
- 816 – King Louis the Pious is crowned emperor of the Holy Roman Empire by the Pope.
- 869 – The Fourth Council of Constantinople is convened to depose patriarch Photios I.
- 1143 – With the signing of the Treaty of Zamora, King Alfonso VII of León and Castile recognises Portugal as a Kingdom.
- 1450 – Louis IX, Duke of Bavaria expels Jews from his jurisdiction.
- 1465 – King Louis XI of France is forced to sign the treaty of Conflans.

=== 1601–1900 ===
- 1607 – Assassins attempt to kill Venetian statesman and scientist Paolo Sarpi.
- 1672 – Jan Sobieski, Grand Hetman of the Polish Crown, begins his successful military campaign against the Tartars following their rebellion and an invasion by the Ottoman Empire.
- 1789 – French Revolution: The Women's March on Versailles effectively terminates royal authority.
- 1813 – War of 1812: The Army of the Northwest defeats a British and Native Canadian force threatening Detroit.
- 1869 – The Saxby Gale devastates the Bay of Fundy region in Canada.
- 1869 – The Eastman tunnel, in Minnesota, United States, collapses during construction, causing a landslide that nearly destroys St. Anthony Falls.
- 1877 – The Nez Perce War in the northwestern United States comes to an end.
- 1900 – Peace congress in Paris condemns British policy in South Africa and asserts Boer Republic's right to self-determination.

=== 1901–present ===
- 1905 – The Wright brothers pilot the Wright Flyer III in a new world record flight of 24 miles in 39 minutes.
- 1910 – In a revolution in Portugal the monarchy is overthrown and a republic is declared.
- 1911 – The Kowloon–Canton Railway commences service.
- 1914 – World War I: An aircraft successfully destroys another aircraft with gunfire for the first time.
- 1921 – The World Series is broadcast on radio for the first time.
- 1930 – British airship R101 crashes in France en route to India on its maiden voyage killing 48 people.
- 1931 – Clyde Edward Pangborn and Hugh Herndon, Jr. make the first nonstop flight across the Pacific Ocean in the plane Miss Veedol.
- 1936 – The Jarrow March sets off for London.
- 1938 – Holocaust: In Nazi Germany, Jews' passports are invalidated.
- 1943 – World War II: Pacific Theater: Ninety-eight American POWs are executed by Japanese forces on Wake Island.
- 1944 – The Provisional Government of the French Republic enfranchises women.
- 1945 – A six-month strike by Hollywood set decorators turns into a bloody riot at the gates of the Warner Brothers studio.
- 1947 – President Truman makes the first televised Oval Office address.
- 1962 – The first of the James Bond film series, based on the novels by Ian Fleming, Dr. No, is released in Britain.
- 1962 – The first Beatles single "Love Me Do" is released in Britain.
- 1963 – The United States suspends the Commercial Import Program in response to repression of the Buddhist majority by the regime of President Ngo Dinh Diem.
- 1966 – A reactor at the Enrico Fermi Nuclear Generating Station near Detroit suffers a partial meltdown.
- 1968 – A Northern Ireland Civil Rights Association march in Derry is violently suppressed by police.
- 1970 – The Public Broadcasting Service (PBS) is founded in the United States.
- 1970 – The British Trade Commissioner, James Cross, is kidnapped by members of the Front de libération du Québec, triggering the October Crisis in Canada.
- 1974 – Bombs planted by the PIRA in pubs in Guildford kill four British soldiers and one civilian.
- 1978 – Brother Eddie Villanueva and 15 others from the Polytechnic University of the Philippines begin the Jesus Is Lord Church.
- 1982 – Tylenol products are recalled after bottles in Chicago laced with cyanide cause seven deaths.
- 1984 – Marc Garneau becomes the first Canadian in space.
- 1985 – Seven Israeli vacationers, including four children, are killed in a mass shooting at Ras Burqa in the Sinai Peninsula by an Egyptian soldier.
- 1988 – A Chilean opposition coalition defeats Augusto Pinochet in his re-election attempt.
- 1990 – After 150 years The Herald newspaper in Melbourne, Australia, is published for the last time as a separate newspaper.
- 1991 – An Indonesian Air Force C-130 crash kills 135 people.
- 1994 – Swiss police find the bodies of 48 members of the Order of the Solar Temple, who had died in a cult mass murder-suicide.
- 1999 – The Ladbroke Grove rail crash in West London kills 31 people.
- 2000 – Mass demonstrations in Serbia force the resignation of Slobodan Milošević.
- 2011 – In the Mekong River massacre, two Chinese cargo boats are hijacked and 13 crew members murdered.
- 2021 – Windows 11 is released to the general public.

== Births ==
=== Pre-1600 ===
- 1274 – Al-Dhahabi, Syrian scholar and historian (died 1348)
- 1338 – Alexios III of Trebizond (died 1390)
- 1377 – Louis II of Anjou (died 1417)
- 1422 – Catherine, Princess of Asturias, Spanish royal (died 1424)
- 1487 – Ludwig of Hanau-Lichtenberg, German nobleman (died 1553)
- 1520 – Alessandro Farnese, Italian cardinal and diplomat (died 1589)
- 1524 – Rani Durgavati, Queen of Gond (died 1564)

=== 1601–1900 ===
- 1609 – Paul Fleming, German physician and poet (died 1640)
- 1641 – Françoise-Athénaïs, marquise de Montespan, French mistress of Louis XIV (died 1707)
- 1658 – Mary of Modena, Queen Consort of England, Scotland and Ireland (died 1718)
- 1687 – Maria Maddalena Martinengo, Italian nun (died 1737)
- 1703 – Jonathan Edwards, American pastor and theologian (died 1758)
- 1712 – Francesco Guardi, Italian painter (died 1793)
- 1713 – Denis Diderot, French philosopher and critic (died 1784)
- 1715 – Victor de Riqueti, marquis de Mirabeau, French economist and educator (died 1789)
- 1728 – Chevalier d'Éon, French diplomat and spy (died 1810)
- 1743 – Giuseppe Gazzaniga, Italian composer and educator (died 1818)
- 1781 – Bernard Bolzano, Czech mathematician and philosopher (died 1848)
- 1792 – Joseph Crosfield, English businessman (died 1844)
- 1795 – Alexander Keith, Scottish-Canadian brewer and politician, 13th Mayor of Halifax (died 1873)
- 1803 – Friedrich Bernhard Westphal, Danish-German painter (died 1844)
- 1816 – Ursula Frayne, Irish-Australian nun and missionary (died 1885)
- 1820 – David Wilber, American lawyer and politician (died 1890)
- 1824 – Henry Chadwick, English-American historian and author (died 1908)
- 1829 – Chester A. Arthur, American general, lawyer, and politician, 21st President of the United States (died 1886)
- 1841 – Philipp Mainländer, German philosopher (died 1876)
- 1844 – Francis William Reitz, South African lawyer and politician, 5th State President of the Orange Free State (died 1934)
- 1848 – Guido von List, Austrian-German journalist and poet (died 1919)
- 1850 – Sergey Muromtsev, Russian lawyer and politician (died 1910)
- 1856 – Peadar Toner Mac Fhionnlaoich, Irish author and playwright (died 1942)
- 1858 – Helen Churchill Candee, American journalist and author (died 1949)
- 1864 – Louis Lumière, French director and producer (died 1948)
- 1873 – Lucien Mérignac, French fencer (died 1941)
- 1877 – Mike O'Neill, Irish-American baseball player and manager (died 1959)
- 1878 – Louise Dresser, American actress (died 1965)
- 1879 – Francis Peyton Rous, American pathologist and virologist, Nobel Prize laureate (died 1970)
- 1882 – Robert H. Goddard, American physicist, engineer, and academic (died 1945)
- 1883 – Ernst Pittschau, German actor (died 1951)
- 1885 – Arunachalam Mahadeva, Sri Lankan politician and diplomat (died 1969)
- 1887 – René Cassin, French judge and academic, Nobel Prize laureate (died 1976)
- 1887 – Manny Ziener, German actress (died 1972)
- 1888 – Mary Fuller, American actress and screenwriter (died 1973)
- 1889 – Teresa de la Parra, French-Venezuelan author and educator (died 1936)
- 1892 – Remington Kellogg, American zoologist and paleontologist (died 1969)
- 1894 – Bevil Rudd, South African runner and journalist (died 1948)
- 1895 – Walter Bedell Smith, U.S. Army general (WWII) and head of CIA (died 1961)
- 1898 – Nachum Gutman, Moldovan-Israeli painter and sculptor (died 1980)
- 1899 – Elda Anderson, American physicist and health researcher (died 1961)

=== 1901–present ===
- 1901 – John Alton, Austrian-American director and cinematographer (died 1996)
- 1902 – Larry Fine, American comedian (died 1975)
- 1902 – Ray Kroc, American businessman and philanthropist (died 1984)
- 1903 – M. King Hubbert, American geophysicist and academic (died 1989)
- 1905 – John Hoyt, American actor (died 1991)
- 1905 – Harriet E. MacGibbon, American actress (died 1987)
- 1907 – Ragnar Nurkse, Estonian-American economist and academic (died 1959)
- 1908 – Mehmet Ali Aybar, Turkish lawyer and politician (died 1995)
- 1908 – Joshua Logan, American director and screenwriter (died 1988)
- 1911 – Pierre Dansereau, Canadian ecologist and academic (died 2011)
- 1911 – Brian O'Nolan, Irish author and playwright (died 1966)
- 1912 – Fritz Fischer, German physician and convicted war criminal (died 2003)
- 1914 – Zhang Zhen, Chinese general and politician (died 2015)
- 1916 – Stetson Kennedy, American author and activist (died 2011)
- 1917 – Magda Szabó, Hungarian author and poet (died 2007)
- 1919 – Donald Pleasence, English actor (died 1995)
- 1922 – José Froilán González, Argentinian racing driver (died 2013)
- 1922 – Bil Keane, American cartoonist (died 2011)
- 1922 – Jock Stein, Scottish footballer and manager (died 1985)
- 1923 – Stig Dagerman, Swedish journalist and author (died 1954)
- 1923 – Albert Guðmundsson, Icelandic footballer and politician (died 1994)
- 1923 – Glynis Johns, British actress and singer (died 2024)
- 1923 – Kailashpati Mishra, Indian lawyer and politician, 18th Governor of Gujarat (died 2012)
- 1924 – Bill Dana, American actor, producer, and screenwriter (died 2017)
- 1924 – José Donoso, Chilean author (died 1996)
- 1924 – Barbara Kelly, Canadian actress and screenwriter (died 2007)
- 1925 – Gail Davis, American actress (died 1997)
- 1925 – Herbert Kretzmer, South African-English journalist and songwriter (died 2020)
- 1926 – Avraham Adan, Israeli general (died 2012)
- 1928 – Louise Fitzhugh, American author and illustrator (died 1974)
- 1928 – Marjorie Finlay, American opera singer and television personality (died 2003)
- 1929 – Richard F. Gordon Jr., American captain, pilot, and astronaut (died 2017)
- 1930 – Pavel Popovich, Ukrainian general, pilot, and cosmonaut (died 2009)
- 1930 – Reinhard Selten, German economist and mathematician, Nobel Prize laureate (died 2016)
- 1931 – Rosalie Gower, Canadian nurse and politician (died 2013)
- 1932 – Neal Ascherson, Scottish journalist and author
- 1934 – Kenneth D. Taylor, Canadian businessman and diplomat (died 2015)
- 1934 – Angelo Buono, American serial killer and rapist (died 2002)
- 1936 – Václav Havel, Czech poet, playwright, and politician, 1st President of the Czech Republic (died 2011)
- 1936 – Adrian Smith, American basketball player (died 2026)
- 1937 – Barry Switzer, American football player and coach
- 1938 – Teresa Heinz, Mozambican-American businesswoman and philanthropist
- 1939 – Marie-Claire Blais, Canadian author and playwright (died 2021)
- 1939 – A. R. Penck, German painter and sculptor (died 2017)
- 1939 – Consuelo Ynares-Santiago, Filipino lawyer and jurist
- 1940 – Bob Cowper, Australian cricketer
- 1940 – Terry Trotter, American jazz pianist
- 1941 – Stephanie Cole, English actress (died 2026)
- 1941 – Eduardo Duhalde, Argentinian lawyer and politician, 50th President of Argentina
- 1941 – Frank Stagg, Irish republican died on hunger strike (died 1976)
- 1943 – Ben Cardin, American lawyer and politician
- 1943 – Steve Miller, American singer-songwriter and guitarist
- 1943 – Michael Morpurgo, English author, poet, and playwright
- 1943 – Etela Farkašová, Slovak philosopher and writer
- 1945 – Brian Connolly, Scottish singer-songwriter (died 1997)
- 1946 – Zahida Hina, Pakistani journalist and author
- 1946 – Robin Lane Fox, English historian and author
- 1946 – Jean Perron, Canadian ice hockey player, coach, and sportscaster
- 1946 – David Watson, English footballer
- 1947 – Brian Johnson, English singer and songwriter
- 1947 – Michèle Pierre-Louis, Haitian politician, 14th Prime Minister of Haiti
- 1949 – Michael Gaughan, Irish Republican died on hunger strike (died 1974)
- 1949 – Ralph Goodale, Canadian lawyer and politician, 36th Canadian Minister of Finance
- 1949 – Yashiki Takajin, Japanese singer and television host (died 2014)
- 1950 – Jeff Conaway, American actor and singer (died 2011)
- 1950 – James Rizzi, American painter and illustrator (died 2011)
- 1951 – Karen Allen, American actress
- 1951 – Bob Geldof, Irish singer-songwriter and actor
- 1952 – Clive Barker, English author, director, producer, and screenwriter
- 1952 – Harold Faltermeyer, German keyboard player, composer, and producer
- 1952 – Imran Khan, Pakistani cricketer and politician, 22nd Prime Minister of Pakistan
- 1955 – John Alexander, English footballer
- 1955 – Jean-Jacques Lafon, French singer-songwriter
- 1955 – Adair Turner, Baron Turner of Ecchinswell, English academic and businessman
- 1957 – Bernie Mac, American actor, comedian, producer, and screenwriter (died 2008)
- 1957 – Lee Thompson, English singer-songwriter and saxophonist
- 1958 – André Kuipers, Dutch physician and astronaut
- 1958 – Neil Peart, Australian footballer
- 1958 – Neil deGrasse Tyson, American astrophysicist, cosmologist, and author
- 1959 – Kenan İpek, Turkish lawyer and judge
- 1959 – Maya Lin, American architect and sculptor, designed the Vietnam Veterans Memorial and Civil Rights Memorial
- 1959 – Kelly Joe Phelps, American singer-songwriter and guitarist (died 2022)
- 1960 – Daniel Baldwin, American actor, director, and producer
- 1960 – Careca, Brazilian footballer
- 1960 – David Kirk, New Zealand rugby player and coach
- 1962 – Michael Andretti, American race car driver
- 1962 – Thomas Herbst, German footballer and manager
- 1962 – Caron Keating, British television host (died 2004)
- 1963 – Laura Davies, English golfer and sportscaster
- 1963 – Tony Dodemaide, Australian cricketer
- 1963 – Michael Hadschieff, Austrian speed skater
- 1964 – Korina Sanchez, Filipino journalist
- 1965 – Mario Lemieux, Canadian ice hockey player
- 1965 – Patrick Roy, Canadian ice hockey player and coach
- 1966 – Dennis Byrd, American football player (died 2016)
- 1966 – Sean M. Carroll, American physicist, cosmologist, and academic
- 1966 – Fredrik Olausson, Swedish ice hockey player
- 1966 – Jan Verhaas, Dutch snooker player and referee
- 1967 – Rex Chapman, American basketball player and sportscaster
- 1967 – Guy Pearce, English-Australian actor
- 1970 – Josie Bissett, American actress
- 1970 – Matthew Knights, Australian footballer and coach
- 1970 – Tord Gustavsen, Norwegian pianist and composer
- 1970 – Cal Wilson, New Zealand comedian, actress, and screenwriter (died 2023)
- 1971 – Tonia Antoniazzi, British politician
- 1971 – Mauricio Pellegrino, Argentinian footballer and manager
- 1972 – Annely Akkermann, Estonian banker and politician
- 1972 – Aaron Guiel, Canadian baseball player
- 1972 – Grant Hill, American basketball player and actor
- 1972 – Thomas Roberts, American journalist and actor
- 1973 – Cédric Villani, French mathematician and academic
- 1974 – Rich Franklin, American mixed martial artist and actor
- 1974 – Heather Headley, Trinidadian-American singer, songwriter, and actress
- 1974 – Colin Meloy, American indie rock singer (The Decemberists)
- 1974 – Anousjka van Exel, Dutch tennis player
- 1975 – Bobo Baldé, French-Guinean footballer
- 1975 – Carson Ellis, American painter and illustrator
- 1975 – Hutch Harris, American songwriter and musician
- 1975 – Parminder Nagra, English actress
- 1975 – Monica Rial, American voice actress, director, and screenwriter
- 1975 – Scott Weinger, American actor
- 1975 – Kate Winslet, English actress
- 1976 – Ramzan Kadyrov, Russian-Chechen general and politician, 3rd President of the Chechen Republic
- 1976 – Royston Tan, Singaporean director, producer, and screenwriter
- 1976 – J. J. Yeley, American race car driver
- 1977 – Hugleikur Dagsson, Icelandic author, illustrator, and critic
- 1977 – Vinnie Paz, Italian-American rapper and producer
- 1977 – Konstantin Zyryanov, Russian footballer
- 1978 – Steinar Nickelsen, Norwegian organist and composer
- 1978 – Jesse Palmer, Canadian football player and sportscaster
- 1978 – Shane Ryan, Irish footballer and hurler
- 1978 – James Valentine, American musician and songwriter
- 1978 – Morgan Webb, Canadian-American television host and producer
- 1979 – Vince Grella, Australian footballer
- 1979 – Curtis Sanford, Canadian ice hockey player
- 1980 – Yuta Tabuse, Japanese basketball player
- 1980 – Paul Thomas, American bass player
- 1980 – James Toseland, English motorcycle racer
- 1980 – Joakim Brodén, Swedish-Czech musician and lead vocalist of the power metal band Sabaton
- 1981 – Jeanette Antolin, American gymnast
- 1981 – Joel Lindpere, Estonian footballer
- 1981 – Andy Nägelein, German footballer
- 1982 – Michael Roos, Estonian-American football player
- 1982 – Steve Williams, Australian-German rugby player
- 1983 – Jesse Eisenberg, American actor and writer
- 1983 – Nicky Hilton, American socialite, fashion designer, and model
- 1983 – Florian Mayer, German tennis player
- 1983 – Mashrafe Mortaza, Bangladeshi cricketer
- 1984 – Naima Adedapo, American singer and dancer
- 1984 – Kenwyne Jones, Trinidadian footballer
- 1984 – Nathalie Kelley, Peruvian-Australian actress
- 1984 – Nate Thompson, American ice hockey player
- 1984 – Angel Perkins, American sprinter
- 1985 – Nicola Roberts, English singer-songwriter
- 1985 – Brooke Valentine, American singer and songwriter
- 1986 – Mladen Bartulović, Croatian footballer
- 1986 – Tanner Roark, American baseball player
- 1987 – Dillon Francis, American DJ and record producer
- 1987 – Michael Grabner, Austrian ice hockey player
- 1987 – Jesse Joensuu, Finnish ice hockey player
- 1987 – Kevin Mirallas, Belgian footballer
- 1987 – Tim Ream, American soccer player
- 1987 – Park So-yeon, South Korean singer, dancer, and actress
- 1987 – Luigi Vitale, Italian footballer
- 1987 – Brandan Wright, American basketball player
- 1988 – Benny Howell, English cricketer
- 1988 – Bahar Kızıl, German singer-songwriter
- 1988 – Maja Salvador, Filipino actress, dancer, singer, and host
- 1989 – Kelsey Adrian, Canadian basketball player
- 1989 – Marcel Baude, German footballer
- 1989 – Ify Ibekwe, American basketball player
- 1989 – Travis Kelce, American football player
- 1990 – Nathan Peats, Australian rugby league player
- 1991 – Pär Lindholm, Swedish ice hockey player
- 1991 – Tornike Shengelia, Georgian basketball player
- 1992 – Kevin Magnussen, Danish racing driver
- 1992 – Cody Zeller, American basketball player
- 1993 – Jewell Loyd, American basketball player
- 1993 – Wakamotoharu Minato, Japanese sumo wrestler
- 1997 – Michael Hoecht, Canadian American football player
- 1998 – Exequiel Palacios, Argentine footballer
- 1999 – Washington Sundar, Indian cricketer
- 2006 – Jacob Tremblay, Canadian actor

== Deaths ==
=== Pre-1600 ===
- 659 BC – Pradyota, King of Avanti and Magadha
- 578 – Justin II, Byzantine emperor (born 520)
- 610 – Phocas, Byzantine emperor
- 989 – Henry III, duke of Bavaria (born 940)
- 1056 – Henry III, Holy Roman Emperor (born 1016)
- 1111 – Robert II, count of Flanders (born 1065)
- 1112 – Sigebert of Gembloux, French monk, historian, and author (born 1030)
- 1214 – Alfonso VIII, king of Castile and Toledo (born 1155)
- 1225 – Al-Nasir, Abbasid caliph (born 1158)
- 1285 – Philip III, king of France (born 1245)
- 1354 – Giovanni Visconti, Italian cardinal (born 1290)
- 1398 – Blanche of Navarre, queen of France (born 1330)
- 1399 – Raymond of Capua, Italian priest and Master General (born c. 1330)
- 1524 – Joachim Patinir, Flemish landscape painter (born c. 1480)
- 1528 – Richard Foxe, English bishop and academic (born 1448)
- 1540 – Helius Eobanus Hessus, German poet and educator (born 1488)
- 1564 – Pierre de Manchicourt, Flemish composer and educator (born 1510)
- 1565 – Lodovico Ferrari, Italian mathematician and academic (born 1522)

=== 1601–1900 ===
- 1606 – Philippe Desportes, French poet and author (born 1546)
- 1629 – Heribert Rosweyde, Jesuit hagiographer (born 1569)
- 1714 – Kaibara Ekken, Japanese botanist and philosopher (born 1630)
- 1740 – Jean-Philippe Baratier, German astronomer and scholar (born 1721)
- 1777 – Johann Andreas Segner, Slovak-German mathematician, physicist, and physician (born 1704)
- 1802 – Sanité Bélair, Haitian freedom fighter (born 1781)
- 1805 – Charles Cornwallis, 1st Marquess Cornwallis, English general and politician, Lord Lieutenant of Ireland (born 1738)
- 1813 – Tecumseh, American tribal leader (born 1768)
- 1827 – William Mullins, 2nd Baron Ventry, Anglo-Irish politician and peer (born 1761)
- 1848 – Joseph Hormayr, Baron zu Hortenburg, Austrian-German historian and politician (born 1781)
- 1861 – Antoni Melchior Fijałkowski, Polish archbishop (born 1778)
- 1880 – Jacques Offenbach, German-French cellist and composer (born 1819)
- 1885 – Thomas C. Durant, American railroad tycoon (born 1820)
- 1895 – Ralph Tollemache, English priest (born 1826)

=== 1901–present ===
- 1913 – Hans von Bartels, German painter and educator (born 1856)
- 1914 – Albert Solomon, Australian politician, 23rd Premier of Tasmania (born 1876)
- 1918 – Roland Garros, French soldier and pilot (born 1888)
- 1921 – John Storey, Australian politician, 20th Premier of New South Wales (born 1869)
- 1927 – Sam Warner, Polish-American director, producer, and screenwriter, co-founded Warner Bros. (born 1887)
- 1929 – Varghese Payyappilly Palakkappilly, Indian priest, founded the Sisters of the Destitute (born 1876)
- 1930 – Christopher Thomson, 1st Baron Thomson, Indian-English soldier and politician, Secretary of State for Air (born 1875)
- 1933 – Renée Adorée, French-American actress (born 1898)
- 1933 – Nikolai Yudenich, Russian general (born 1862)
- 1936 – J. Slauerhoff, Dutch poet and author (born 1898)
- 1938 – Faustina Kowalska, Polish nun and saint (born 1905)
- 1938 – Albert Ranft, Swedish actor and director (born 1858)
- 1940 – Ballington Booth, English-American activist, co-founded the Volunteers of America (born 1857)
- 1940 – Lincoln Loy McCandless, American rancher and politician (born 1859)
- 1940 – Silvestre Revueltas, Mexican violinist, composer, and conductor (born 1889)
- 1941 – Louis Brandeis, American lawyer and jurist (born 1856)
- 1942 – Dorothea Klumpke, American astronomer (born 1861)
- 1943 – Leon Roppolo, American clarinet player and composer (born 1902)
- 1950 – Frederic Lewy, German-American neurologist and academic (born 1885)
- 1952 – Joe Jagersberger, Austrian racing driver (born 1884)
- 1967 – Clifton Williams, American astronaut (born 1932)
- 1976 – Barbara Nichols, American actress (born 1928)
- 1976 – Lars Onsager, Norwegian-American chemist and physicist, Nobel Prize laureate (born 1903)
- 1981 – Gloria Grahame, American actress (born 1923)
- 1983 – Humberto Mauro, Brazilian director and screenwriter (born 1897)
- 1983 – Earl Tupper, American inventor and businessman, founded the Tupperware Corporation (born 1907)
- 1985 – Karl Menger, Austrian-American mathematician from the Vienna Circle (born 1902)
- 1986 – Mike Burgmann, Australian racing driver and accountant (born 1947)
- 1986 – Hal B. Wallis, American film producer (born 1898)
- 1986 – James H. Wilkinson, English mathematician and computer scientist (born 1919)
- 1992 – Eddie Kendricks, American singer-songwriter (born 1939)
- 1996 – Seymour Cray, American engineer and businessman, founded CRAY Inc (born 1925)
- 1997 – Brian Pillman, American football player and wrestler (born 1962)
- 2000 – Johanna Döbereiner, Brazilian agronomist (born 1924)
- 2000 – Cătălin Hîldan, Romanian footballer (born 1976)
- 2001 – Mike Mansfield, American soldier, politician, and diplomat, 22nd United States Ambassador to Japan (born 1903)
- 2002 – Chuck Rayner, Canadian ice hockey player (born 1920)
- 2003 – Dan Snyder, Canadian-American ice hockey player (born 1978)
- 2003 – Timothy Treadwell, American environmentalist, director, and producer (born 1957)
- 2004 – Rodney Dangerfield, American comedian, actor, producer, and screenwriter (born 1921)
- 2004 – William H. Dobelle, American biologist and academic (born 1941)
- 2004 – Maurice Wilkins, New Zealand-English physicist and biologist, Nobel Prize laureate (born 1916)
- 2006 – Antonio Peña, Mexican wrestling promoter, founded Lucha Libre AAA World Wide (born 1953)
- 2010 – Bernard Clavel, French journalist and author (born 1923)
- 2010 – Mary Leona Gage, American model and actress, Miss USA 1957 (born 1939)
- 2010 – Steve Lee, Swiss singer-songwriter (born 1963)
- 2011 – Derrick Bell, American academic and scholar (born 1930)
- 2011 – Bert Jansch, Scottish singer-songwriter and guitarist (born 1943)
- 2011 – Steve Jobs, American businessman, co-founder of Apple Inc. (born 1955)
- 2011 – Charles Napier, American actor and singer (born 1936)
- 2011 – Fred Shuttlesworth, American activist, co-founded the Southern Christian Leadership Conference (born 1922)
- 2011 – Gökşin Sipahioğlu, Turkish photographer and journalist (born 1926)
- 2012 – Keith Campbell, English biologist and academic (born 1954)
- 2012 – Vojin Dimitrijević, Croatian-Serbian lawyer and activist (born 1932)
- 2012 – James W. Holley III, American dentist and politician (born 1926)
- 2012 – Edvard Mirzoyan, Georgian-Armenian composer and educator (born 1921)
- 2012 – Claude Pinoteau, French director and screenwriter (born 1925)
- 2013 – Ruth R. Benerito, American chemist and academic (born 1916)
- 2013 – Carlo Lizzani, Italian actor, director, producer, and screenwriter (born 1922)
- 2013 – Yakkun Sakurazuka, Japanese voice actress and singer (born 1976)
- 2014 – David Chavchavadze, English-American CIA officer and author (born 1924)
- 2014 – Andrea de Cesaris, Italian racing driver (born 1959)
- 2014 – Geoffrey Holder, Trinidadian-American actor, singer, dancer, and choreographer (born 1930)
- 2014 – Yuri Lyubimov, Russian actor and director (born 1917)
- 2015 – Chantal Akerman, Belgian-French actress, director, and producer (born 1950)
- 2015 – Joker Arroyo, Filipino lawyer and politician (born 1927)
- 2015 – Grace Lee Boggs, American philosopher, author, and activist (born 1915)
- 2015 – Henning Mankell, Swedish author and playwright (born 1948)
- 2016 – Brock Yates, American journalist and author (born 1933)
- 2017 – Eberhard van der Laan, Dutch politician, mayor of Amsterdam (born 1955)
- 2024 – Robert Coover, American novelist (born 1932)
- 2026 – Jeffrey Archer, English novelist and politician (born 1940)

== Holidays and observances ==
- World Space Week (October 4–10)
- Armed Forces Day (Indonesia)
- Christian feast day:
  - Anna Schäffer
  - Charitina of Amisus
  - Faustina Kowalska
  - Flora of Beaulieu
  - Bartolo Longo
  - Hor and Susia (Coptic Orthodox Church of Alexandria)
  - Placid and Maurus
  - Placidus (martyr)
  - Blessed William Hartley
  - October 5 (Eastern Orthodox liturgics)
- Constitution Day (Vanuatu)
- Engineer's Day (Bolivia)
- International Day of No Prostitution
- Republic Day (Portugal)
- Teachers' Day (Pakistan)
- Teachers' Day (Russia)
- World Teachers' Day
