= September 4 (Eastern Orthodox liturgics) =

Day in the Eastern Orthodox liturgical calendar

Eastern Orthodox liturgical calendar
September 3	September 4	September 5
September 4 O.S. ≍ September 17 N.S. September 4 N.S ≍ August 22 O.S.

An Eastern Orthodox cross

September 4 in Eastern Orthodox liturgical calendars is a feast day and a day of commemoration of saints and martyrs. Although some Orthodox churches use the Revised Julian Calendar and others use the traditional Julian calendar, the fixed commemorations for their respective September 4 are broadly the same, no matter which calendar is used. (Note: Despite the dates being the same, the days to which they refer typically differ by 13 days. The notation Old Style or O.S. is sometimes used to indicate a date in the traditional Julian Calendar (the "Old Calendar"). The notation New Style or N.S. indicates a date in the Revised Julian calendar (the "New Calendar").)

== Saints ==
- Holy Prophet and God-seer Moses, on Mount Nebo (c. 1450 B.C.) (Note: According to the Orthodox Menaion, September 4 was the day that Moses saw the Land of Promise. The Orthodox Church also commemorates him on the Sunday of the Forefathers, two Sundays before the Nativity. In Constantinople, the Prophets Moses, Aaron and Elisha were also commemorated on July 20, together with the Prophet Elijah the Thesbite (cf. Delahaye: Syn. Cp. p. 832).) (Note: The glorious Prophet and God-seer Moses ((in Hebrew): מֹשֶׁה Mōsheh, Mōsheh ben Amram; (in Greek): Mωϋσῆς, Mōÿsēs in both the Septuagint and the New Testament; (in Arabic): موسىٰ, Mūsā), meaning one who draws forth, is drawn out, or is saved from the water, ca.1570 BC - ca.1450 BC, was the deliverer, prophet, legislator, judge, and leader of the Israelites from the period of The Exodus of the Israelites from slavery in Egypt, to their arrival on the doorstep of Canaan near the Jordan River. He is best known for leading the Israelites out of Egypt, bringing the Ten Commandments (Decalogue) down from Mount Sinai, establishing the Mosaic Covenant and founding the religious community known as Israel. His life is narrated in the Septuagint from Exodus 2 through to Deuteronomy 34:10-12. Considered something more than a prophet, for God spoke face-to-face with Moses (Exodus 33:11), he was a true servant of the Lord in every sense of the word and is the supremely wise Lawgiver ((in Greek): Ο Νομοθέτης), the most ancient historian of all to whom the authorship of the Pentateuch is traditionally attributed (c. 1491-1451 BC), and through whom the Seven Old Testament Feasts of Lord were instituted by God's command as described in Leviticus Chapter 23. For forty years, Moses lived at the court of the Pharaoh (his Egyptian training); for the next forty years, he lived as a shepherd in contemplation of God and the world (his exile in Arabia); and for his remaining forty years, he led the people through the wilderness to the Promised Land (his government of the Israelite nation). He beheld the Promised Land, but was not allowed to enter it, for he had once sinned against God (Numbers 20:12). Thus Moses reposed at the age of 120. As a miracle-worker, he was a prefiguration of Christ, according to St. Basil the Great.) (Note: The following dates are given as the birth dates of Moses: 1391 BC -- Rabbinical Judaism calculated a lifespan of Moses corresponding to 1391–1271 BC (Seder Olam Rabbah (2nd c. AD Hebrew language chronology)).; 1550 BC -- Given in the Prologue from Ohrid, compiled by St. Nikolaj Velimirović (1928).; 1569 BC -- The Great Synaxaristes in the Greek, gives 1569 BC for the birth of Moses.; 1571 BC -- The 17th-century Ussher chronology calculates 1571 BC (Annals of the World, 1658).; 1571 BC -- According to Dr. Floyd Nolen Jones, in: The Chronology of the Old Testament (2009).; 1592 BC -- Jerome's Chronicon (c. 380 AD) gives 1592 BC for the birth of Moses.) (see also: July 20; Bright Wednesday - Synaxis of All Saints of Mt. Sinai)
- Martyrs Thathuil and Bebaia of Edessa (c. 116) (Note: They were siblings from Edessa, and lived in the years of Emperor Hadrian (or Trajan according to others), c. 116. Thathuil was a sorcerer (demonic priest) and became Christian due to the efforts of the blessed bishop Barsimaeus. Because of his conversion, he was severely whipped by the local governor Augurus, and was eventually blinded. Later, they hung him from one hand, opened his abdomen and burned his sides with fire. Finally they beheaded him and he received the crown of martyrdom.) (see also: January 29)
- Martyr Sarbellus (Sarvillos, Zarvilos), by stoning.
- Martyr Hermione of Ephesus, daughter of Apostle Philip the Deacon (c. 117) (Note: Name days celebrated today include: Hermione (Ἐρμιόνη).)
- Saints Theotimos and Theodoulos the Executioners, who believed in Christ through St. Hermione, died peacefully (c. 117)
- Saint Petronius, likely the disciple of St. John the Theologian, who met St. Hermione in Ephesus (2nd century)
- Martyrs Christodoula and her sons Urban, Prilidian, and Epolonios (251)
- Hieromartyr Babylas of Antioch, Bishop of Antioch, and three students, Ammonius, Donatos and Faustus (c. 251 or c. 284)
- The 3608 (or 3628) Martyrs of Nicomedia (c. 290) (see also: September 2)
- Martyr Babylas of Nicomedia, and with him 84 children (3rd-4th century)
- Martyrs Theodore, Ammianus, Julian, Oceanus, Centurionus, of Nicomedia (288) (Note: "Also, the holy martyrs Theodore, Oceanus, Ammian, and Julian, who had their feet cut off, and consummated their martyrdom by being thrown into the fire, in the time of the emperor Maximian.")
- Martyrs Kegourus, Secundinus, Secundus and their mother Jerusalem, in Veria.
- Martyr Charitina of Amisus (c. 304) (see also: October 5, January 15)
- Saint Petronius of Egypt, disciple of St. Pachomius the Great (346)

== Pre-Schism Western saints ==
- Saint Candida the Elder (c. 78) (Note: An aged woman who welcomed the Apostle Peter in Naples and was miraculously healed by him. In her turn she converted St Aspren who became the first Bishop of Naples.) (Note: "At Naples, in Campania, the birthday of St. Candida, who was the first to meet St. Peter when he came to that city, and being baptized by him, afterwards ended her holy life in peace.")
- Saint Marcellus, a priest in Lyons, buried up to his waist on the banks of the Saône, where he survived for three days before he died (c. 178) (Note: "At Chalons, in France, St. Marcellus, martyr, under the emperor Antoninus. Being invited to a profane banquet by the governor Priscus, and abhorring the meats that were served, he reproved with great freedom all persons present for worshipping the idols. For this, by an unheard-of kind of cruelty, the same governor had him buried alive up to the waist. After persevering for three days in praising God, he yielded up his undefiled soul.")
- Saint Marinus, hermit, founder of a chapel and monastery, from where the world's oldest surviving republic, San Marino, grew (4th century) (Note: He was born on an island off the coast of Dalmatia and became a stonemason. Ordained deacon by Gaudentius, Bishop of Rimini, he reposed as a hermit in the region now called after him, (the Republic of) San Marino.) (Note: "Rimini, St. Marinus, deacon.")
- Saint Marcellus, Bishop of Trier in Germany. (Note: "At Treves, St. Marcellus, bishop and martyr.")
- Saint Salvinus, third Bishop of Verdun in the north of France (c. 420)
- Saint Boniface I, a priest who was elected Pope of Rome in 418 (422)
- Saint Monessa, a holy woman converted by St Patrick in Ireland (456) (Note: S. MONESSA, the beautiful daughter of an Irish chief, though not a Christian, refused all the offers made for her hand. When she heard S. Patrick preach the Faith of the Virgin-born, she believed with all her heart and was baptized, and straightway as she came out of the regenerating wave, for joy of heart, her spirit broke its bonds, and entered into celestial joy.".)
- Saint Caletricus, Bishop of Chartres (c. 580) (Note: See: (in French) Calétric de Chartres. Wikipédia. (French Wikipedia).)
- Saint Ultan of Ardbraccan, Bishop of Ardbraccan in Ireland (7th century) (Note: St Ultan was noted for his love for children and for the writings of St Brigid.)
- Saint Rhuddlad, patron of Llanrhyddlad at the foot of Moel Rhyddlad in Anglesey in Wales (7th century)
- Saint Ida of Herzfeld (c. 813) (Note: Happily married, she was widowed when she was still very young. She founded the convent of Herzfeld in Westphalia in Germany and devoted herself to good works.) (Note: This saint came of a family as illustrious in the annals of profane history as in those of the Church. She was the granddaughter of Count Bernard, son of Charles Martel, and Gundlindis, daughter of Adelbert, Duke of the Alemanni, whose sister was S. Odilia. Her parents were Theodoric, Duke of the Ripuarii, and Theodrada, afterwards Abbess of Soissons. Charles Martel her great-grandfather was son of Pepin, son of S. Bega and nephew of S. Gertrude, and grandson of the Blessed Pepin of Landen and of S. Itta or Iduberga, his wife. S. Ida was married to Ecbert, Duke of the Saxons who inhabited the region between the Rhine and the Weser. After his death, she spent her widowhood in works of charity and daily devotion. She had a stone coffin made for herself, and filled it daily to the brim with food for the poor. She was buried at Herzfeld.".)
- Saint Sulpicius of Bayeux (Sulpice), Bishop of Bayeux in France from c 838 to 843, martyred by the Vikings in Livry (843)

== Post-Schism Orthodox saints ==
- Saint Symeon, Abbot and Wonderworker of Gareji (1773)
- Venerable Anthimus the Blind, the New Ascetic, of Cephalonia, patron saint of Astypalaia (1782)
- New Hieromartyr Parthenius, abbot, of Kiziltash Monastery in the Crimea (1867)

=== New martyrs and confessors ===
- New Hieromartyr Gregory (Lebedev), Bishop of Schlüsselburg (1937) (Note: See: (in Russian) Григорий (Лебедев). Википедии. (Russian Wikipedia).)
- New Hieromartyr Sergius (Druzhinin), Bishop of Narva (1937) (Note: See: (in Russian) Сергий (Дружинин). Википедии. (Russian Wikipedia).)
- New Hieromartyr Stephen (Kuskov), Hieromonk, of Nikolskoye, Tver (1937)
- New Hieromartyrs Paul Vasilievsky, John Vasilevsky, Nicholas Lebedev, Nicholas Sretensky, John Romashkin, Nicholas Voshtev, Alexander Nikolsky, Peter Lebedinsky, Michael Bogorodsky, Elias Izmailov, Priests (1937)
- Martyrs Basil Yezhov, Peter Lonskov, Stephen Mityushkin and Alexander Blokhin (1937)
- New Hieromartyr Peter (Zimonjić), Metropolitan of Dabro-Bosnia (1941) (Note: See: (in Serbian) Петар Зимоњић. Википедију. (Serbian Wikipedia).)
- Virgin-Martyr Elena Chernova (1942)

== Other commemorations ==
- Icon of the Most Holy Theotokos "The Unburnt Bush" (1680) (see also: March 25)
- Translation of the relics of St. Birinus (649), Bishop of Dorchester-on-Thames and Enlightener of Wessex.
- Translation of the relics (995) of St. Cuthbert (687), Bishop of Lindisfarne. (Note: "Bede relates, in the life of S. Cuthbert, that the saint charged his disciples before his death, that rather than ever fall under the yoke of schismatics or infidels, they should, when threatened with such a calamity, take with them his mortal remains, and choose some other dwelling. In the year 875 the province of Northumberland was so cruelly infested by Danish pirates, and Lindisfarne was so much exposed to their continual ravages, that Eardulf the bishop, Eadred the abbot, and the community of the monks, left that place, and carrying with them that sacred treasure, wandered to and fro for seven years. In 882 they rested with it at Concester (Chester-le-Street), a few miles from the Roman wall, where the bishop's see continued one hundred and thirteen years, as Camden remarks. Both King Alfred and the Danish leader granted peace for a month to all persons that fled to the saint's shrine, and Alfred gave to this church all the land that lies between the Tyne and the Tees. In 995, in the fresh inroads of the Danes, Bishop Aldune retired with the saint's body to Ripon, and four months after to Durham, a place strong by its natural situation, but not habitable, till the people of the country, on this occasion, cut down the wood, and raised a small church, and cells for the monks.".)
- Uncovering of the relics (1911) of St. Ioasaph, Bishop of Belgorod (1754).
- Uncovering of the relics (1967) of St. Theodore Hatzis, the New Martyr of Mytilene (1784) (Note: His feast day is one January 30.)
- Second uncovering of the relics (1989) of St. Metrophanes (Macarius in schema), Bishop of Voronezh (1703).
- Synaxis of the Saints of Voronezh.

== Icon gallery ==
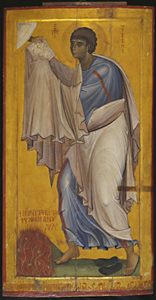
Moses receiving the Law.

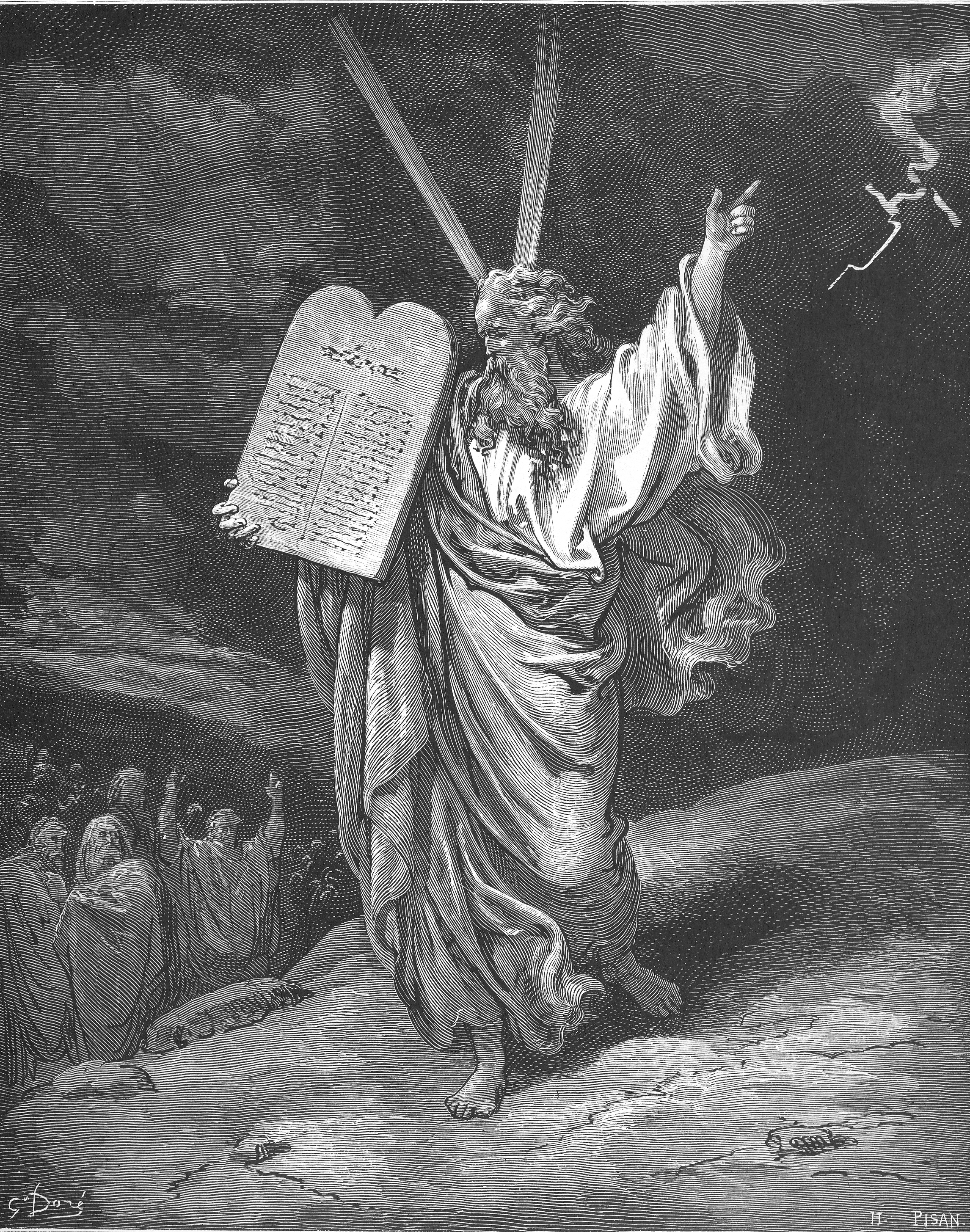
Moses Comes Down from Mount Sinai (Ex. 19:25,20:1-17). (Gustave Doré).

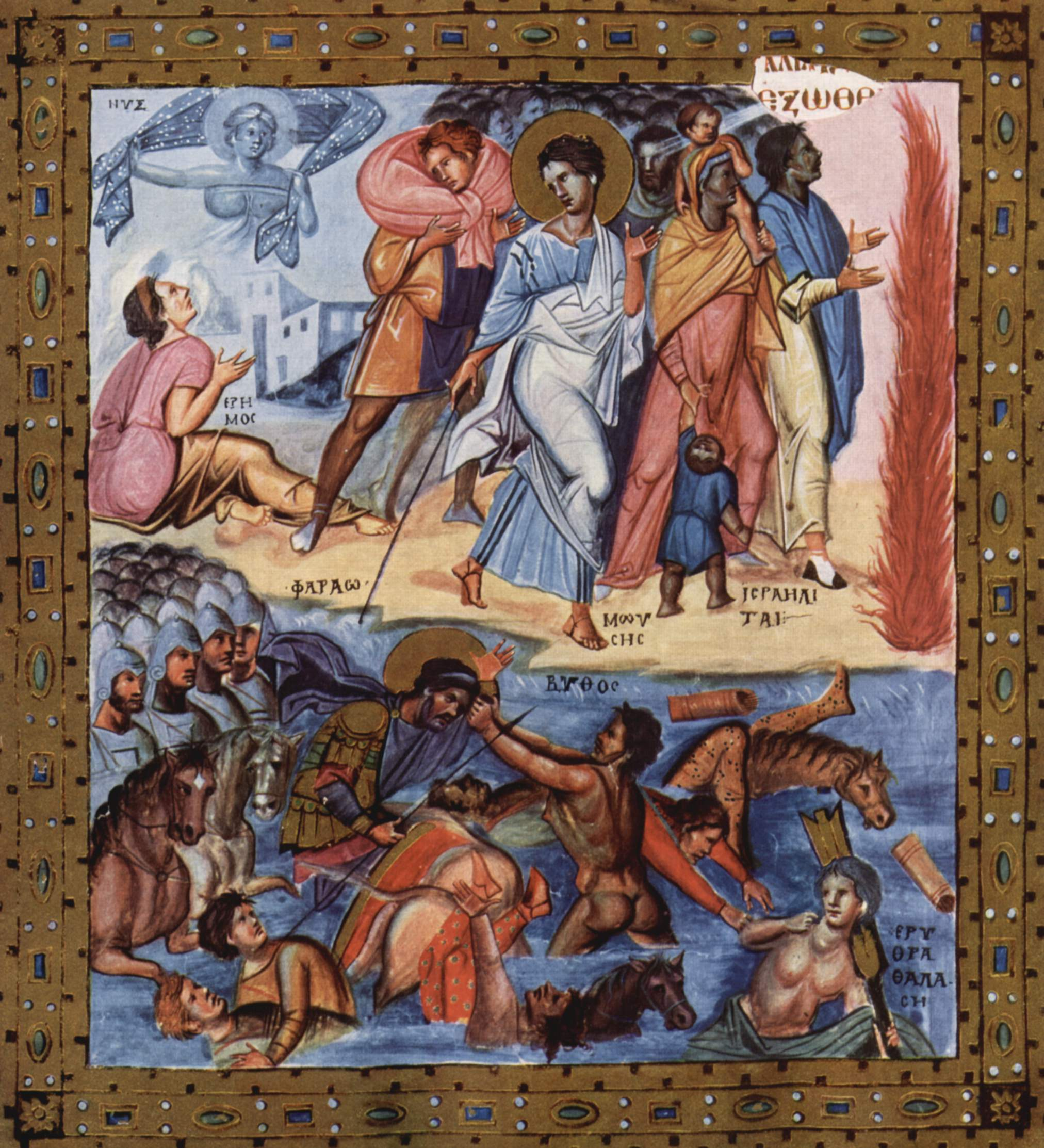
Moses and the Israelites pass through the Red Sea and the army of Pharaoh is drowned. (Paris Psalter, mid-10th c.)

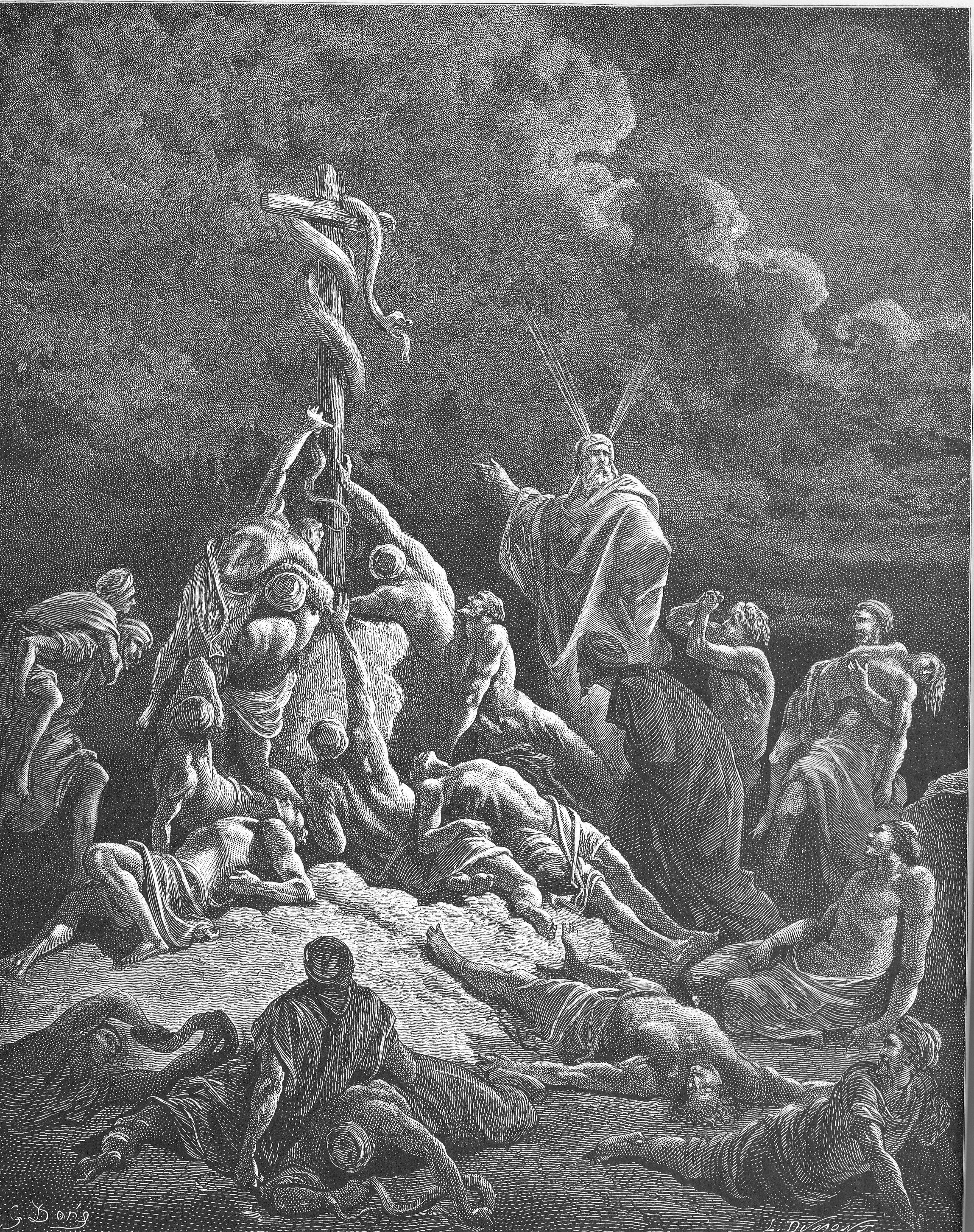
Moses erects the Bronze Serpent (Num. 21:4-9). (Gustave Doré).

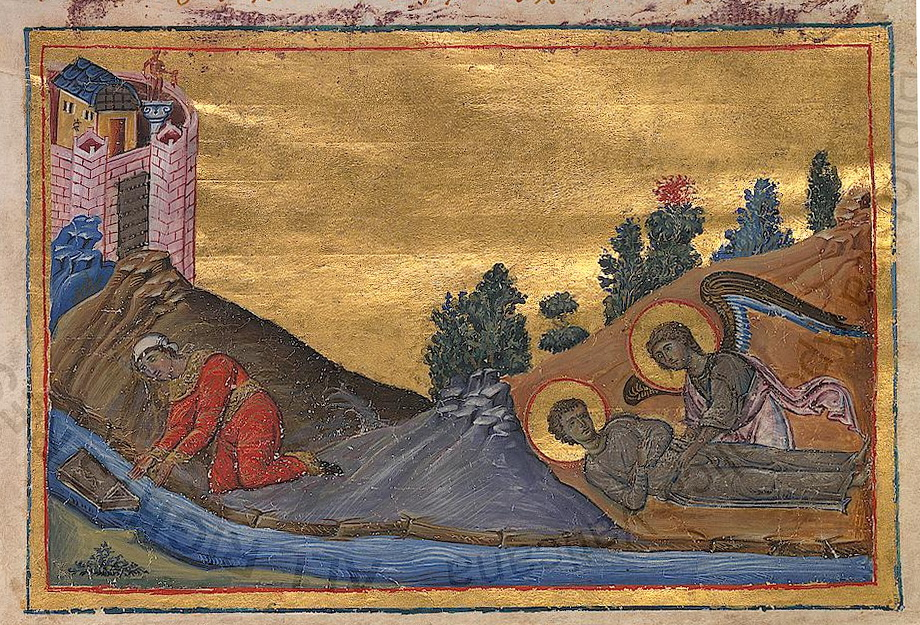
A conflation of events from Moses' life:
Left: the basket is taken from the Nile River by the daughter of Pharaoh;
Right: the death of Moses on Mt. Nebo overlooking the Jordan River.
(Menologion of Basil II, 10th century).

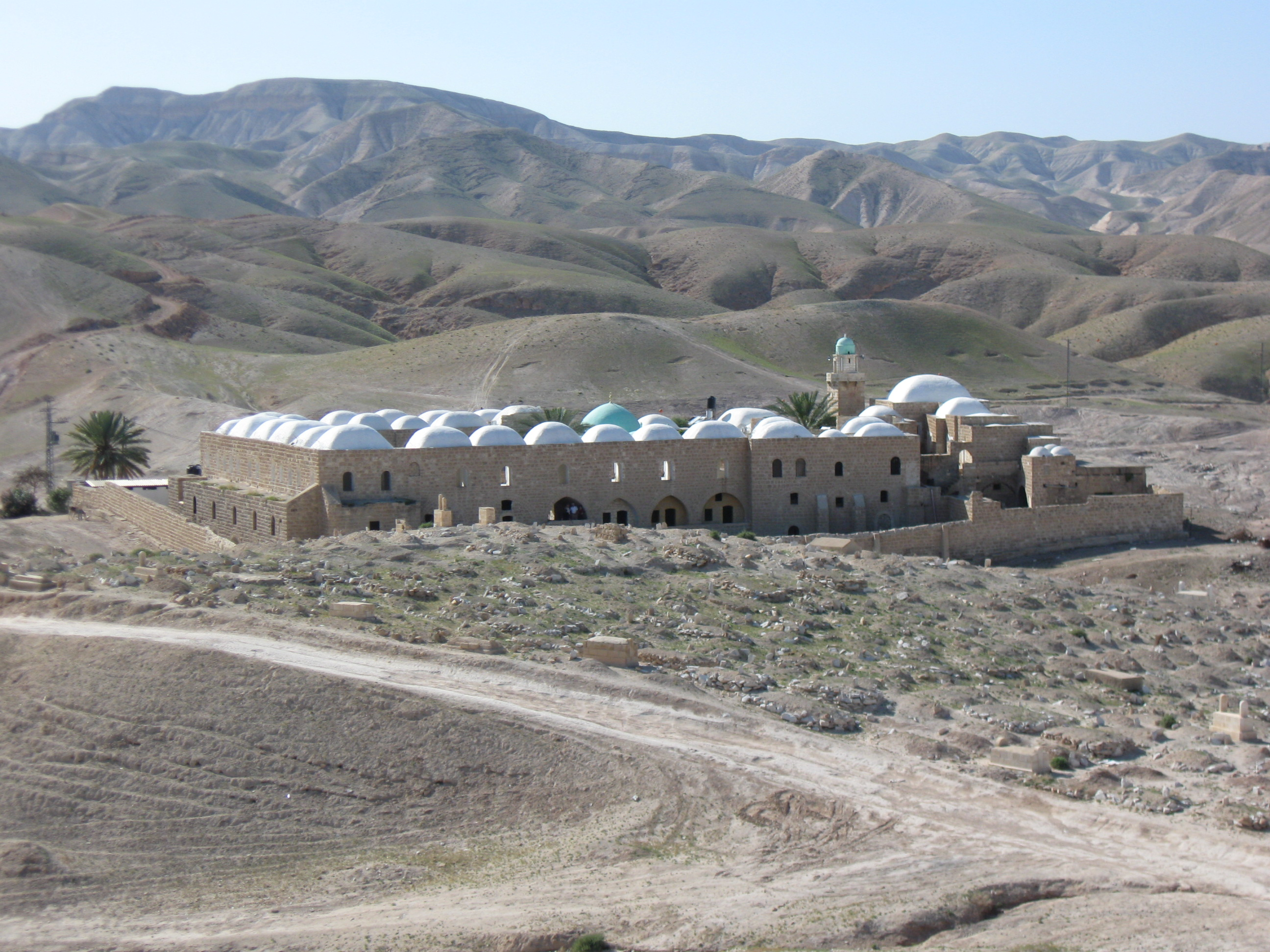
Nabi Musa, the traditional site of Moses' Tomb in the Judaean Desert.

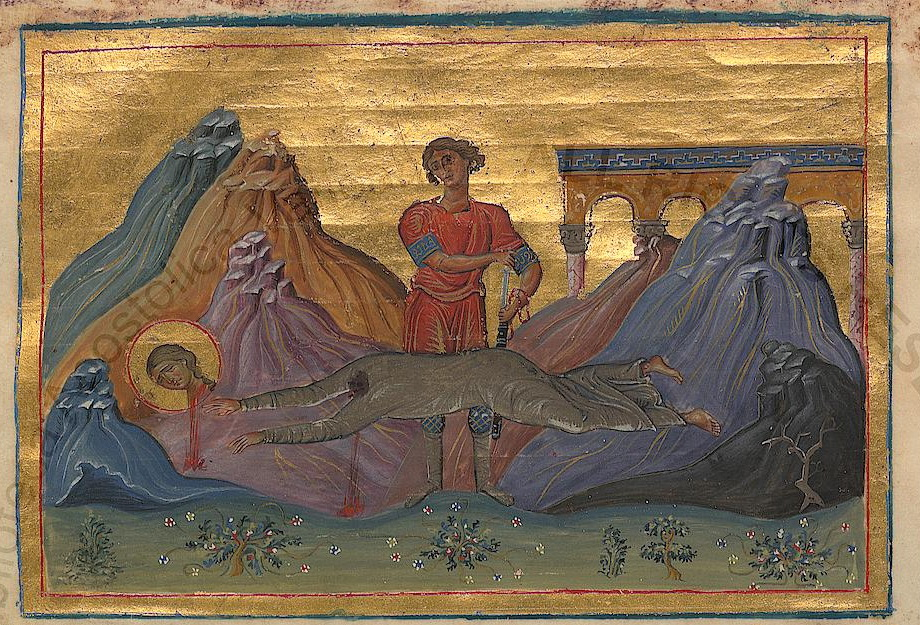
Martyr Hermione of Ephesus, daughter of Apostle Philip the Deacon.
(Menologion of Basil II, 10th century).

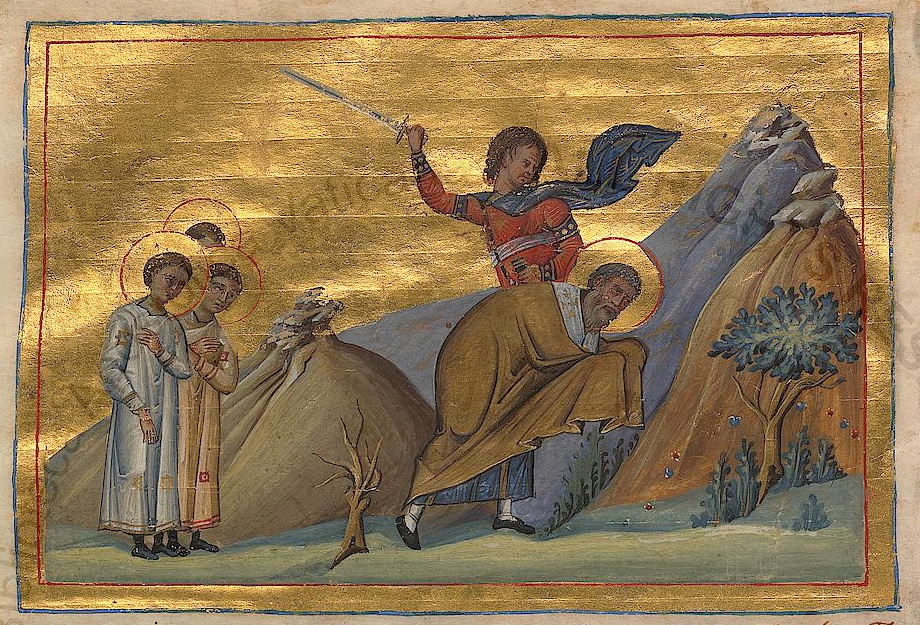
Hieromartyr Babylas of Antioch.
(Menologion of Basil II, 10th century).

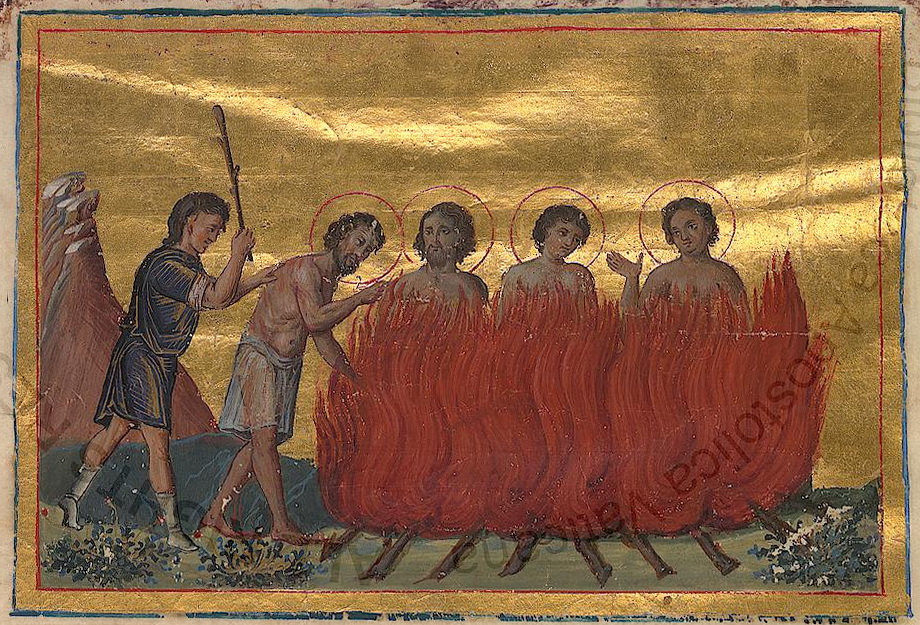
Martyrs Theodore, Ammianus, Julian, Oceanus, Centurionus, of Nicomedia.
(Menologion of Basil II, 10th century).

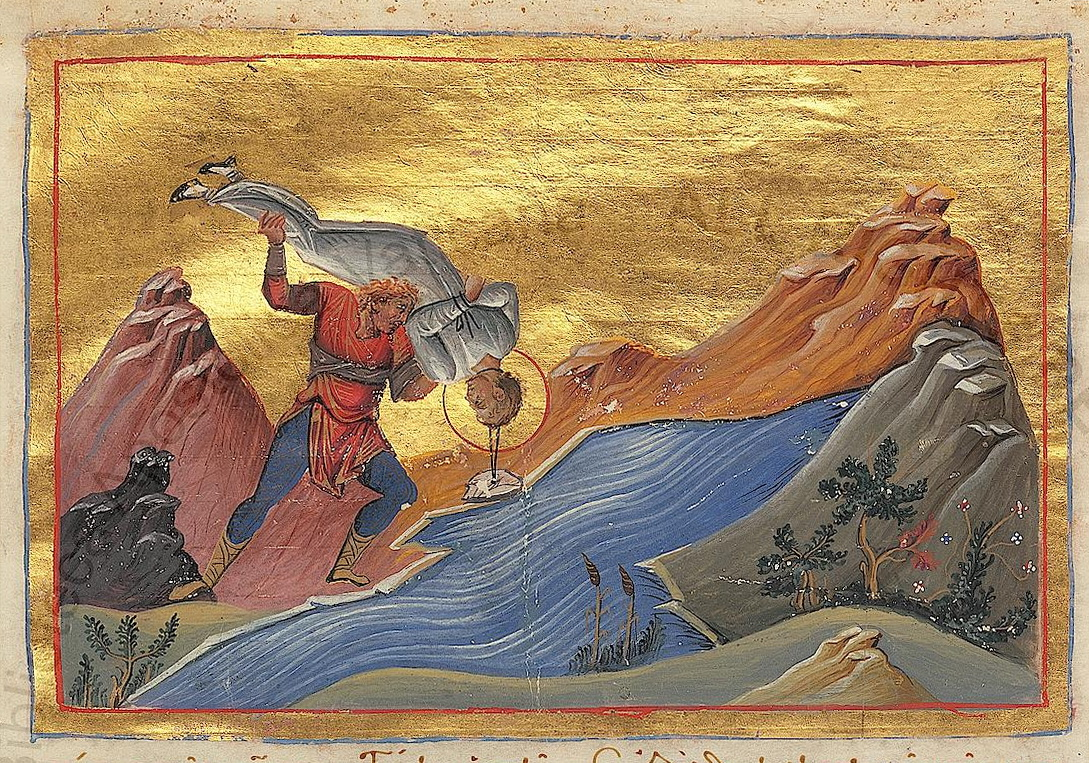
Martyr Charitina of Amisus.
(Menologion of Basil II, 10th century).

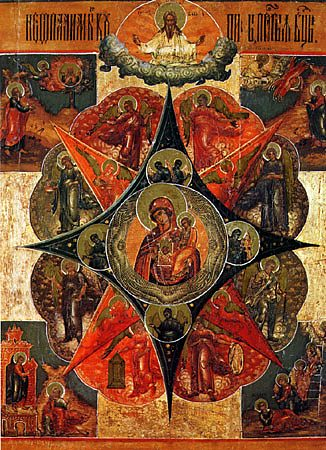
Icon of Our Lady of the Burning Bush (Neopalimaya Kupina).

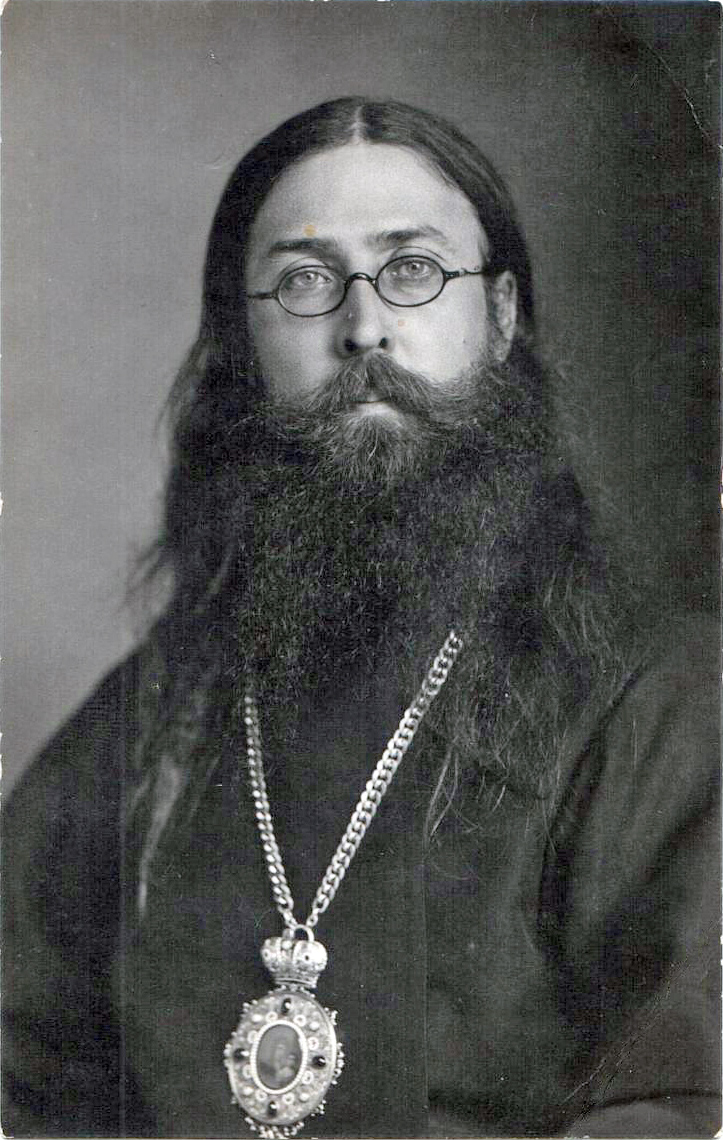
New Hieromartyr Gregory (Lebedev), Bishop of Schlüsselburg.

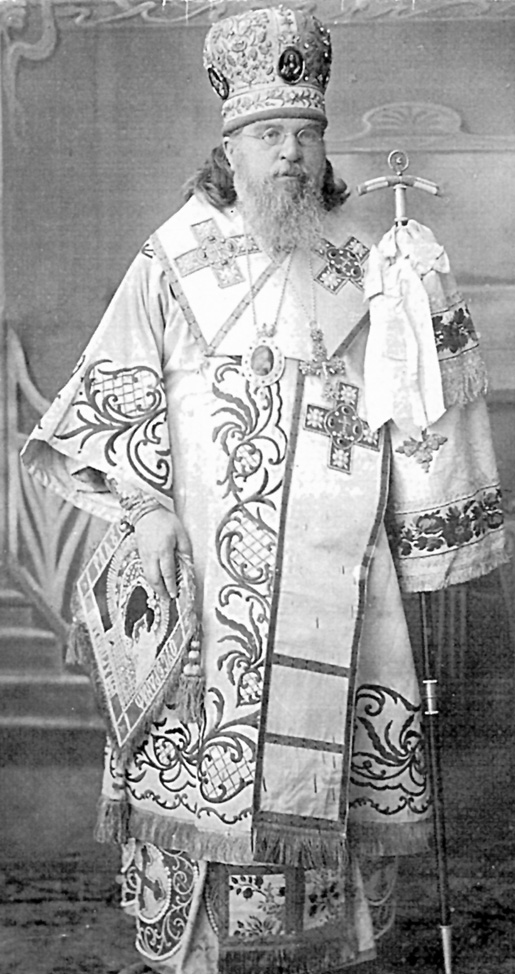
New Hieromartyr Sergius (Druzhinin), Bishop of Narva.

== Sources ==
- September 4/September 17. Orthodox Calendar (PRAVOSLAVIE.RU).
- September 17 / September 4. HOLY TRINITY RUSSIAN ORTHODOX CHURCH (A parish of the Patriarchate of Moscow).
- September 4. OCA - The Lives of the Saints.
- The Autonomous Orthodox Metropolia of Western Europe and the Americas (ROCOR). St. Hilarion Calendar of Saints for the year of our Lord 2004. St. Hilarion Press (Austin, TX). p. 66.
- The Fourth Day of the Month of September. Orthodoxy in China.
- September 4. Latin Saints of the Orthodox Patriarchate of Rome.
- The Roman Martyrology. Transl. by the Archbishop of Baltimore. Last Edition, According to the Copy Printed at Rome in 1914. Revised Edition, with the Imprimatur of His Eminence Cardinal Gibbons. Baltimore: John Murphy Company, 1916. pp. 270–271.
- Rev. Richard Stanton. A Menology of England and Wales, or, Brief Memorials of the Ancient British and English Saints Arranged According to the Calendar, Together with the Martyrs of the 16th and 17th Centuries. London: Burns & Oates, 1892. pp. 435–436.

Greek Sources

- Great Synaxaristes: (in Greek) 4 ΣΕΠΤΕΜΒΡΙΟΥ. ΜΕΓΑΣ ΣΥΝΑΞΑΡΙΣΤΗΣ.
- (in Greek) Συναξαριστής. 4 Σεπτεμβρίου. ECCLESIA.GR. (H ΕΚΚΛΗΣΙΑ ΤΗΣ ΕΛΛΑΔΟΣ).
- (in Greek) 04/09/2026. Ορθόδοξος Συναξαριστής.

Russian Sources

- (in Russian) 17 сентября (4 сентября). Православная Энциклопедия под редакцией Патриарха Московского и всея Руси Кирилла (электронная версия). (Orthodox Encyclopedia - Pravenc.ru).
- (in Russian) 4 сентября по старому стилю / 17 сентября по новому стилю. Русская Православная Церковь - Православный церковный календарь на 2026 год.
