= October 5 (Eastern Orthodox liturgics) =

Day in the Eastern Orthodox liturgical calendar

Eastern Orthodox liturgical calendar
October 4	October 5	October 6
October 5 O.S. ≍ October 18 N.S. October 5 N.S ≍ September 22 O.S.

An Eastern Orthodox cross

October 5 in Eastern Orthodox liturgical calendars is a feast day and a day of commemoration of saints and martyrs. Although some Orthodox churches use the Revised Julian Calendar and others use the traditional Julian calendar, the fixed commemorations for their respective October 5 are broadly the same, no matter which calendar is used. (Note: Despite the dates being the same, the days to which they refer typically differ by 13 days. The notation Old Style or O.S. is sometimes used to indicate a date in the traditional Julian Calendar (the "Old Calendar"). The notation New Style or N.S. indicates a date in the Revised Julian calendar (the "New Calendar").)

== Saints ==
- Hieromartyrs Dionysius of Alexandria, Bishop of Alexandria, and the Deacons Gaius and Faustus (Note: See also: October 4.) (264-265)
- Virgin Martyr Charitina of Amisus (304) (Note: Name days celebrated today include: Charitini, Haritine, Haritini, Tina, Hara (Χαριτίνη).) (Note: "The same day, under the emperor Diocletian and the ex-consul Domitius, St. Charitina, a virgin, who was exposed to the fire and thrown into the sea; but escaping uninjured, she had her hands and feet cut off, her teeth plucked out, and finally she yielded her spirit in prayer.") (see also: September 4, January 15)
- Hieromartyr Hermogenes the Wonderworker, Bishop of Samos, whose relics are in Cyprus. (Note: He is not recorded in the Synaxarion. However he is known as a local saint of Cyprus. Fragments of his relics are kept at Proussos Monastery in Evrytania, and at Kykkos Monastery in Cyprus.)
- Martyr Mamelta (Mamelchtha) of Persia (344)
- Saint Gregory (Grigol), Archimandrite of Khandzta in the Klarjeti desert, Georgia (861)
- St. Cosmas, Abbot, in Bithynia (10th century)

== Pre-Schism Western saints ==
- Saint Palmatius and Companions, martyrs in Trier in Germany under Maximian Herculeus (c. 287) (Note: "At Treves, the holy martyrs Palmatius and his companions, who suffered martyrdom in the persecution of Diocletian, under the governor Rictiovarus.")
- Saint Boniface, one of the martyrs with St Palmatius and Companions in Trier in Germany (c. 287)
- Saint Alexander, one of the 'innumerable multitude' martyred in Trier in Germany under Diocletian (3rd century)
- Saint Marcellinus of Ravenna, the second or third Bishop of Ravenna in Italy (3rd century) (Note: "At Ravenna, St. Marcellinus, bishop and confessor.")
- Saints Firmatus, a Deacon, and Flaviana, a virgin, venerated as martyrs in Auxerre in France. (Note: "At Auxerre, the departure from this life of the saintly deacon Firmatus and the virgin Flaviana, his sister.")
- Saint Apollinaris of Valence (Aiplonay), Bishop of Valence (c. 520) (Note: "At Valence, in France, St. Apollinaris, a bishop, who was renowned in life for virtues, and in death for miracles and prodigies.")
- Saint Galla of Rome, a lady in Rome who, as a widow, led the life of an anchoress on the Vatican Hill, where she died of breast cancer (c. 550) (Note: "At Rome, St. Galla, widow, daughter of the consul Symmachus, who, after the death of her husband, remained many years near the church of St. Peter, applying to prayer, almsgiving, fasting, and other pious works. Her most happy death has been described by pope St. Gregory.")
- Saint Magdalveus (Madalveus, Mauvé), a monk at St Vannes and later (c 736) Bishop of Verdun (776)
- Saint Meinulph, founder of the monastery of Böddeken in Westphalia in Germany (c. 859)
- Saint Aymard of Cluny, Abbot of Cluny in France (965) (Note: He succeeded St Odo as Abbot of Cluny in France in 942. However, after about ten years he became blind and resigned his office to St Majolus, setting for all an example of resignation for the rest of his life.)
- Saint Attilanus, a Spanish Benedictine and Bishop of Zamora, he was prior of Moreruela Abbey (1009) (Note: Born in Tarazona near Saragossa in Spain, he became a monk at Moreruela with St Froilan. The two dioceses of Leon and Zamora vacant, Froilan was appointed to the former and Attilanus to the latter and they were consecrated together at Pentecost 990.)

== Post-Schism Orthodox saints ==
- Saints Damian the Healer (1071), (Note: See: (in Russian) Дамиан Целебник. Википедии. (Russian Wikipedia).) and Saints Jeremiah (c. 1070) (Note: See: (in Russian) Иеремия Печерский. Википедии. (Russian Wikipedia).) and Matthew (c. 1085), (Note: See: (in Russian) Матфей Прозорливый. Википедии. (Russian Wikipedia).) clairvoyants, of the Kiev Caves.
- Saint John (Mavropos), Metropolitan of Euchaita (1100)
- Saint Charitina, Princess of Lithuania (1281)
- Saint Sabbas the Fool-for-Christ, of Vatopedi monastery, Mount Athos (1350) (see also: June 15 )
- Saint Varlaam, desert-dweller of Chikoysk (1846)
- Venerable Methodia, recluse, of Kimolos (1908)
- Saint Seraphim (Amelin), schema-archimandrite of Glinsk Hermitage (1958)

=== New Martys and Confessors ===
- New Hiero-confessor Gabriel (Igoshkin), Archimandrite, of Melekess (Saratov), Confessor (1959)

== Other commemorations ==
- Synaxis of the Venerable Fathers and Mothers of the Klarjeti Wilderness, holy fellow-strugglers of St. Gregory of Khandzta (9th century)
- Synaxis of the Hierarchs of Moscow:

- Saints Peter (1326), Theognostus (1353), Alexis (1378),Cyprian (1406), Photius (1431), Jonah (1461), Gerontius (1489), Ioasaph (1555), Macarius (1563), Philip (1569), Job (1607), Hermogenes (1612), Philaret (1867), Innocent (Veniaminov) (1879), Tikhon (1925), Macarius II (1926), and Peter (Polyansky) (1937), Hierarchs of Moscow.

- Synaxis of All Saints Who Shone Forth in the Iberian Peninsula (established 2018) — (On the Sunday before October 12 — between October 5-11 )
- Uncovering of the relics (1841) of Venerable Eudocimus the Unknown, monk of Vatopedi monastery, Mount Athos.
- Uncovering of the relics (1985) of New Hiero-confessor Basil (Preobrazhensky), Bishop of Kineshma (1945)
- Repose of Nun Agnia (Countess Anna Orlova-Chesmenskaya) of Novgorod (1848)
- Repose of Hieroschemamonk Paisius (Olaru) of Sihastria, Romania (1990) (Note: See: (in Romanian) Paisie Olaru. Wikipedia. (Romanian Wikipedia).)

== Icon gallery ==
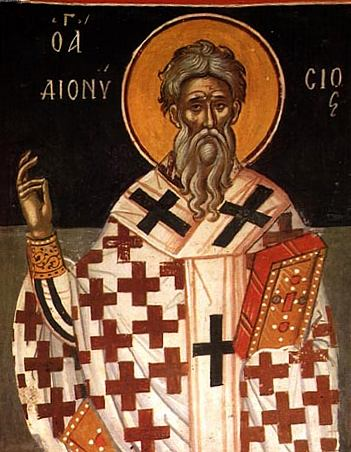
Hieromartyr Dionysius of Alexandria, Patriarch of Alexandria.

Virgin martyr Charitina of Amisus, tortured with burning coals.
(Menologion of Basil II, 10th century).

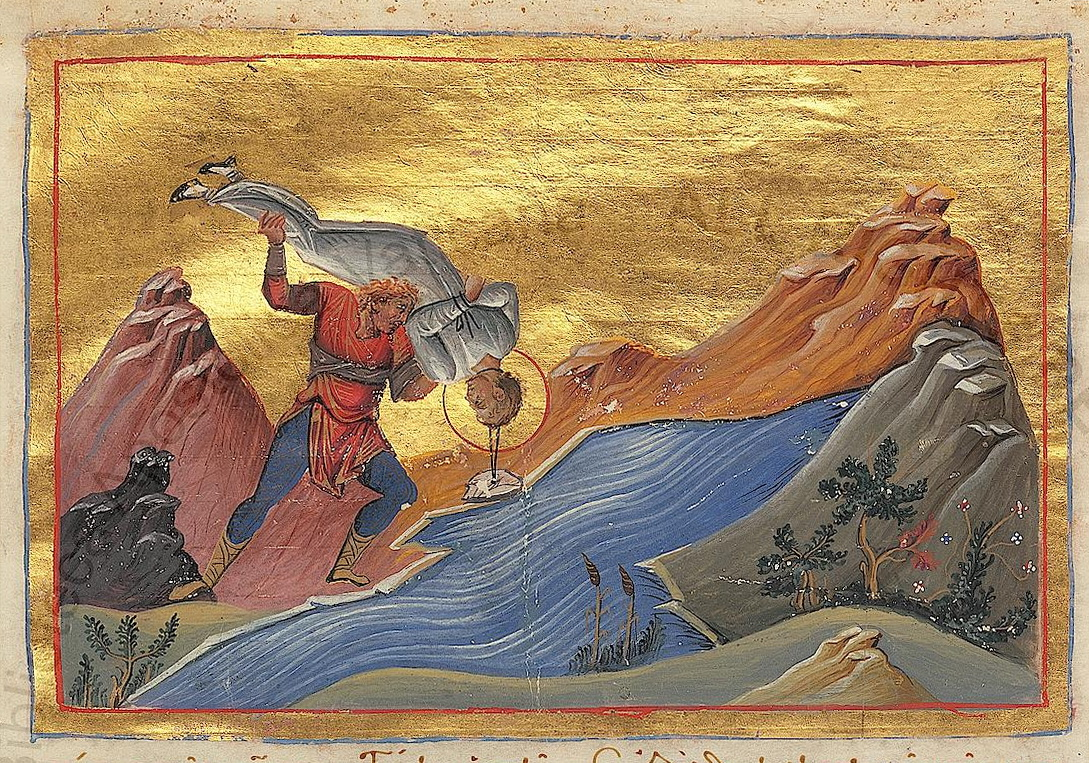
Virgin martyr Charitina of Amisus, thrown into the sea.
(Menologion of Basil II, 10th century).

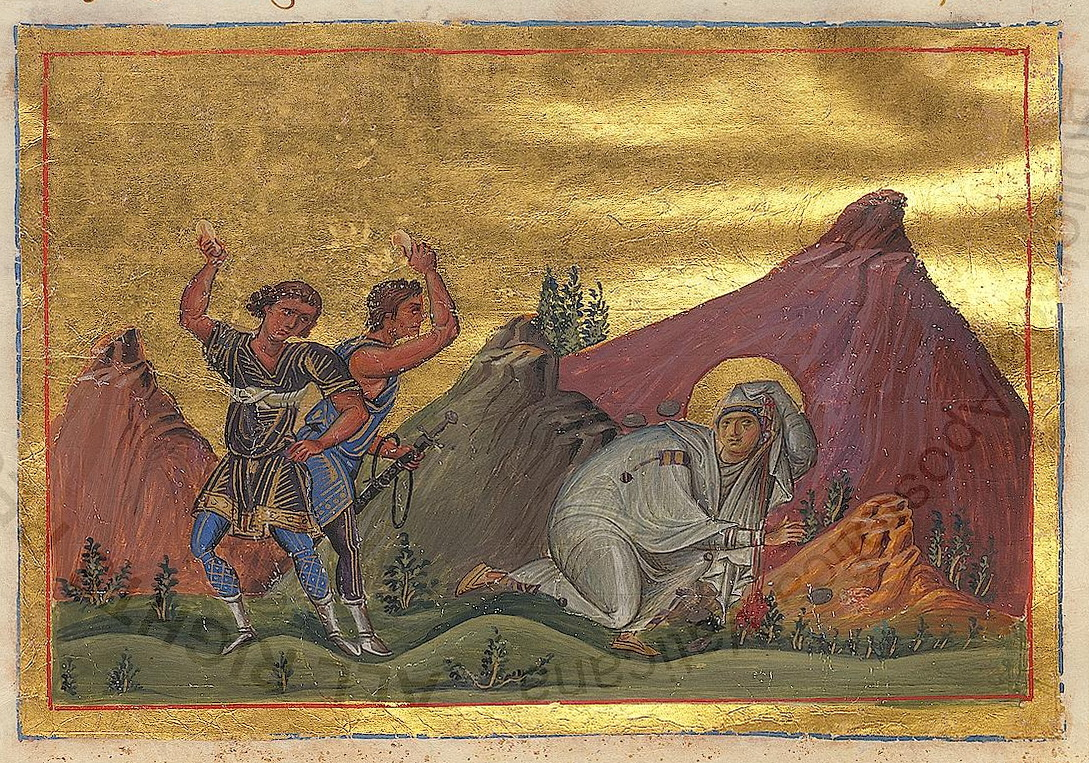
Martyr Mamelta (Mamelchtha) of Persia.
(Menologion of Basil II, 10th century).

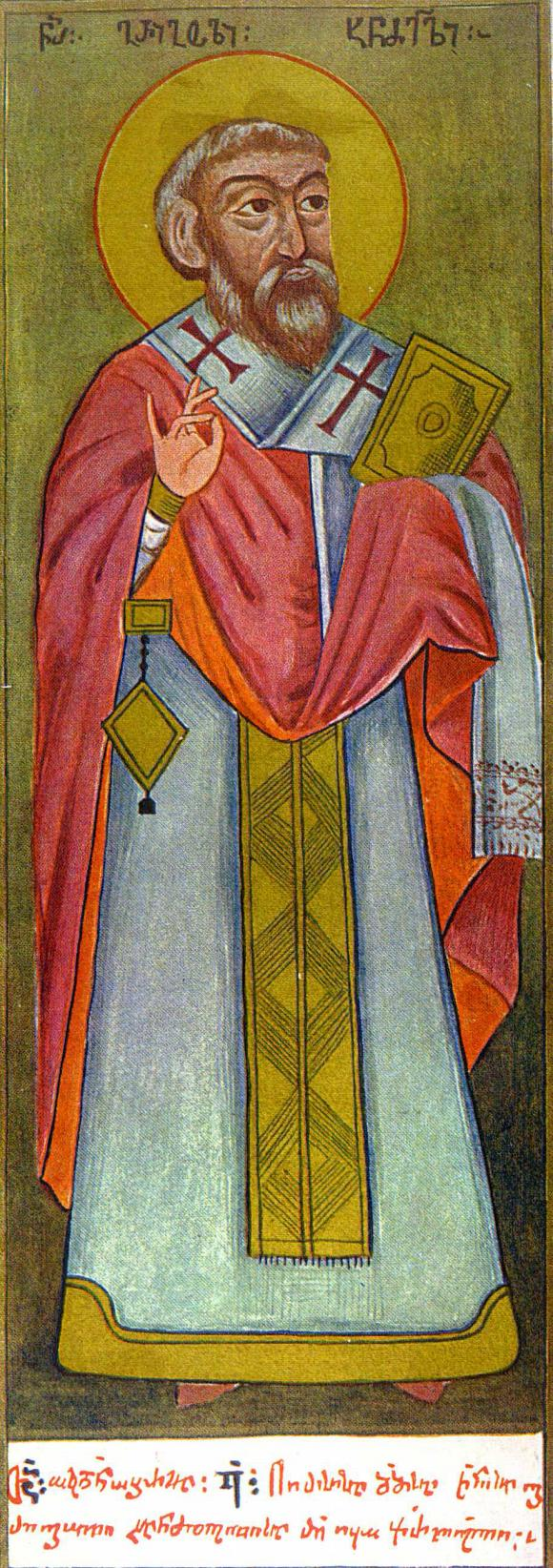
St. Gregory of Khandzta.

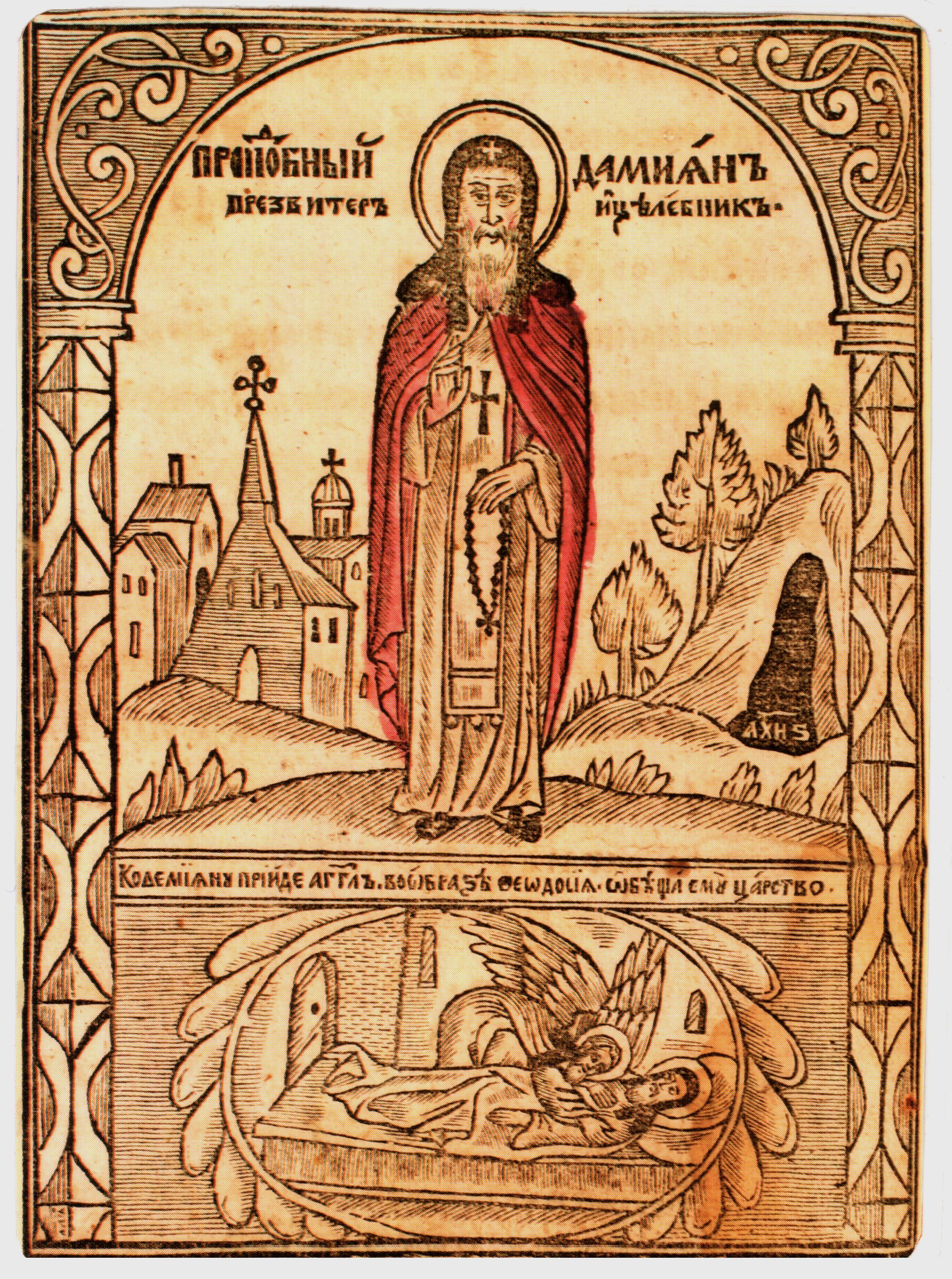
St. Damian the Healer of the Kiev Caves.

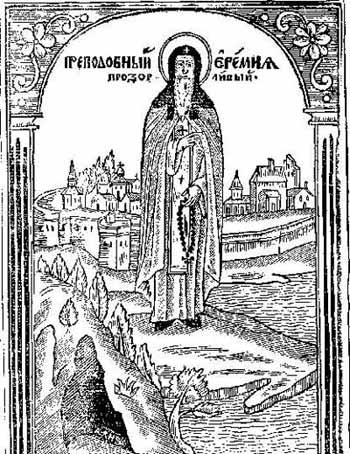
St. Jeremiah of the Kiev Caves.

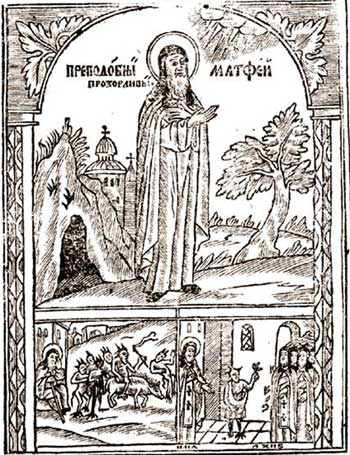
St. Matthew of the Kiev Caves.

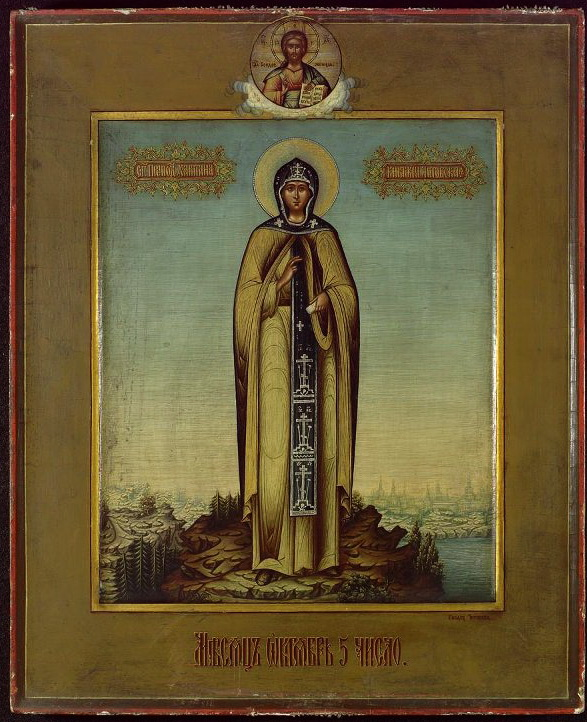
St. Charitina, Princess of Lithuania.

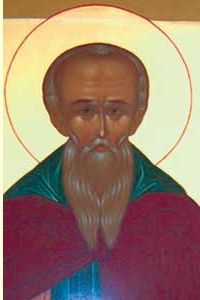
St. Varlaam, desert-dweller of Chikoysk.

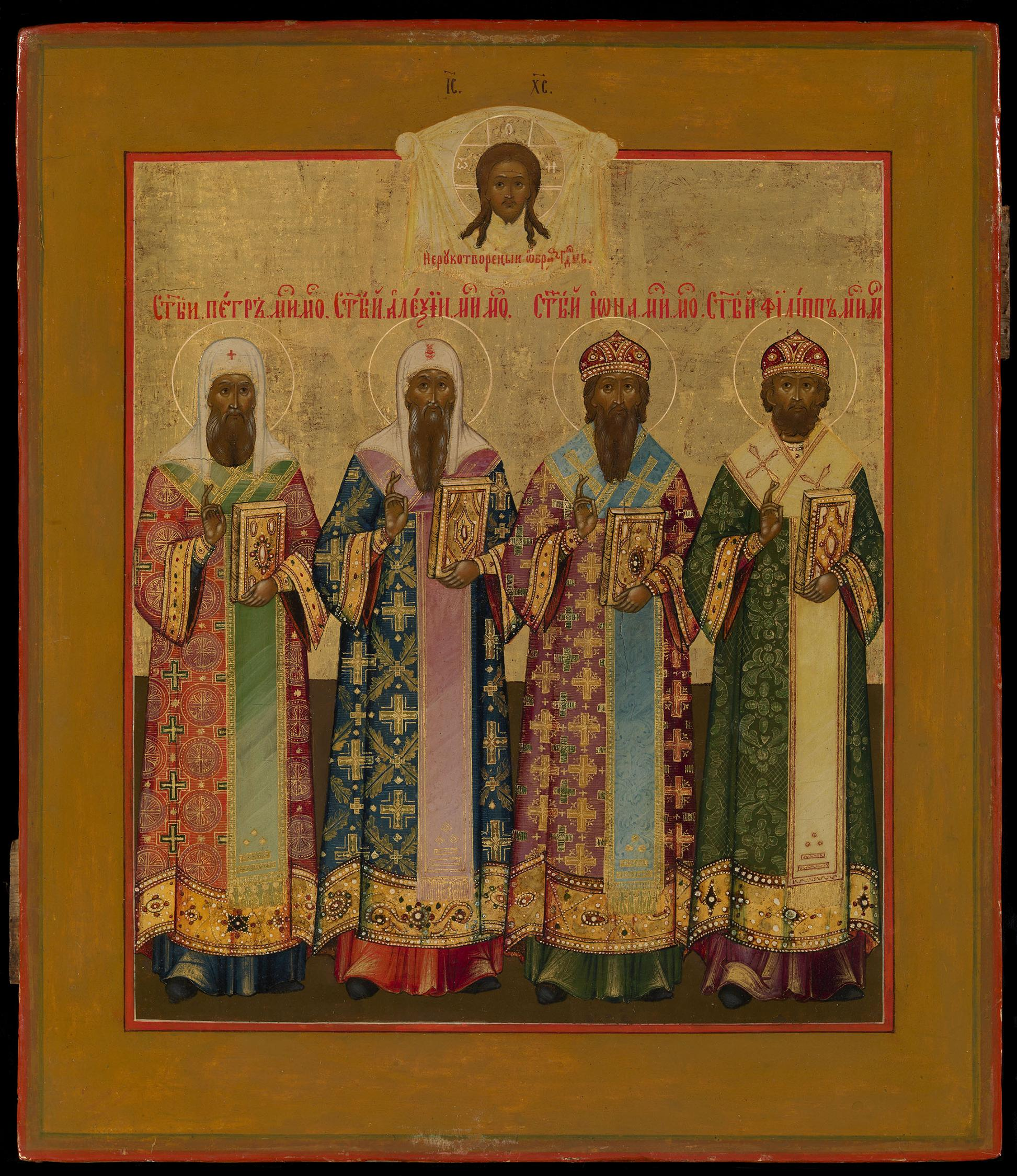
Metropolitans Peter, Alexis, Jonah and Philip, Hierarchs of Moscow.

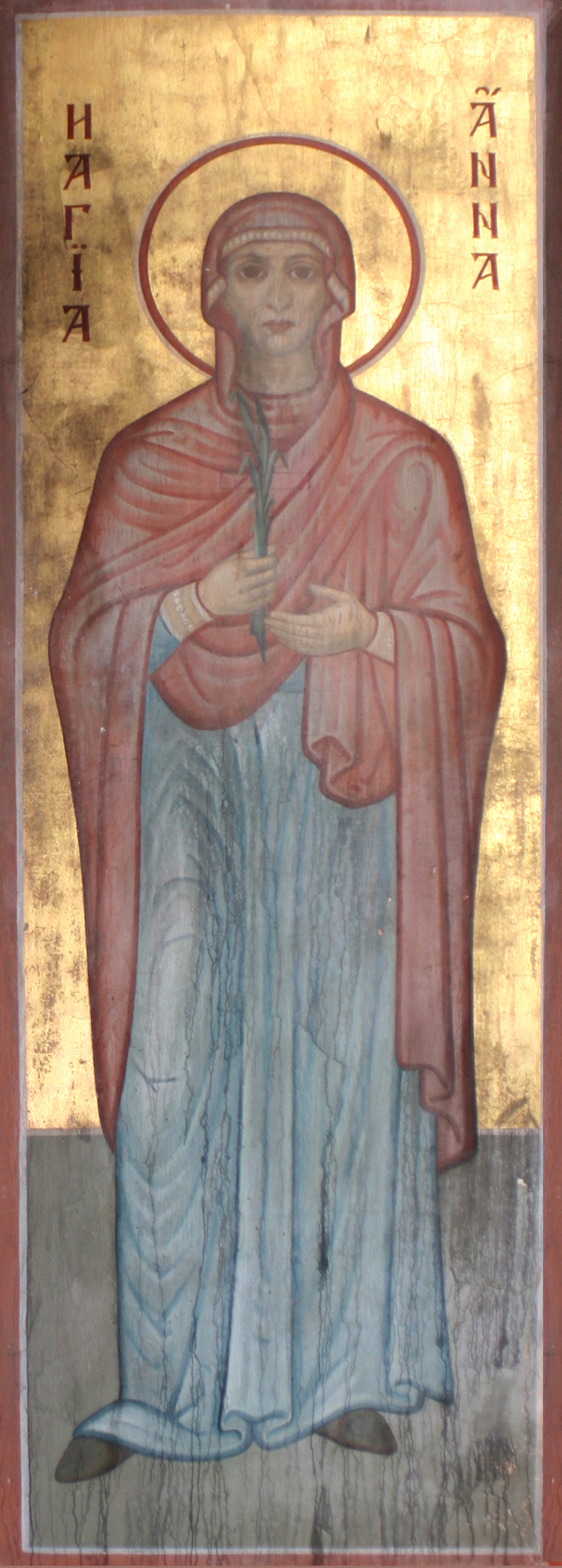
Nun Agnia (Countess Anna Orlova-Chesmenskaya) of Novgorod.

== Sources ==
- October 5/18. Orthodox Calendar (PRAVOSLAVIE.RU).
- October 18 / October 5. HOLY TRINITY RUSSIAN ORTHODOX CHURCH (A parish of the Patriarchate of Moscow).
- October 5. OCA - The Lives of the Saints.
- The Autonomous Orthodox Metropolia of Western Europe and the Americas (ROCOR). St. Hilarion Calendar of Saints for the year of our Lord 2004. St. Hilarion Press (Austin, TX). p. 74.
- The Fifth Day of the Month of October. Orthodoxy in China.
- October 5. Latin Saints of the Orthodox Patriarchate of Rome.
- The Roman Martyrology. Transl. by the Archbishop of Baltimore. Last Edition, According to the Copy Printed at Rome in 1914. Revised Edition, with the Imprimatur of His Eminence Cardinal Gibbons. Baltimore: John Murphy Company, 1916. pp. 307–308.
- Rev. Richard Stanton. A Menology of England and Wales, or, Brief Memorials of the Ancient British and English Saints Arranged According to the Calendar, Together with the Martyrs of the 16th and 17th Centuries. London: Burns & Oates, 1892. pp. 475–476.

Greek Sources

- Great Synaxaristes: (in Greek) 5 ΟΚΤΩΒΡΙΟΥ. ΜΕΓΑΣ ΣΥΝΑΞΑΡΙΣΤΗΣ.
- (in Greek) Συναξαριστής. 5 Οκτωβρίου. ECCLESIA.GR. (H ΕΚΚΛΗΣΙΑ ΤΗΣ ΕΛΛΑΔΟΣ).
- (in Greek) 05/10/2016. Ορθόδοξος Συναξαριστής.

Russian Sources

- (in Russian) 18 октября (5 октября). Православная Энциклопедия под редакцией Патриарха Московского и всея Руси Кирилла (электронная версия). (Orthodox Encyclopedia - Pravenc.ru).
- (in Russian) 5 октября по старому стилю / 18 октября по новому стилю. Русская Православная Церковь - Православный церковный календарь на 2016 год.
