= John Calybite =

Greek monk (died c. 450)

Saint John Calybite
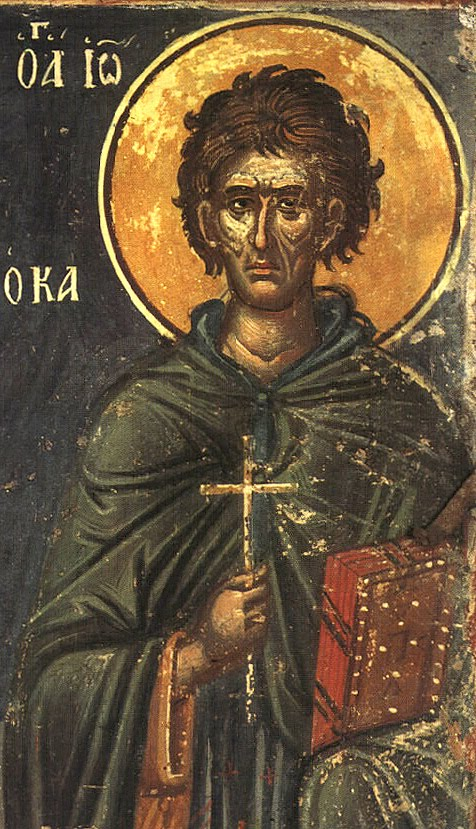
- Athonite Fresco of Saint John Calabytes
- Born: 5th century Constantinople (modern-day Istanbul, Turkey)
- Died: c. 450; Constantinople
- Venerated in: Eastern Orthodox Church; Roman Catholic Church
- Feast: 15 January
- Attributes: Beggar with a Gospel in his hand

John Calybite (Note: The name "Calybite" is from the Greek calybe, a small hut, the place where he spent the last years of his life.) (or John Calabites, Calibita, Chalybita, Calabytes, Kalabytes, Kalybites, Kalyvitis (Greek: Ἰωάννης ὁ Καλυβίτης); died c. 450) was a Greek monk and hermit who is venerated as a saint by the Eastern Orthodox Church and Roman Catholic Church. He left home at a young age and for several years was a monk in Jerusalem. He returned home disguised as a beggar, and his parents did not recognize him, but gave him a hut to live in. He revealed himself to his mother when on his deathbed. His feast day is celebrated on 15 January.

== Sources ==
=== Monks of Ramsgate account ===
The monks of St Augustine's Abbey, Ramsgate, wrote in their Book of Saints (1921),

John Chalybita (St.) Hermit (Jan. 15)
(5th cent.) Born in Constantinople of noble and wealthy parents, when about twelve years old he secretly left his home to become a monk near Jerusalem. After serving God manfully in his monastery for about six years his Abbot gave him permission to revisit his home. On his way he disguised himself as a beggar, and his mother, not knowing him, drove him from her door. He thenceforth subsisted on the charity of his parents in a little hut in the neighbourhood, spending his time in prayer and good works. After three years, Our Lord visited him and told him that his trial was over. John then sent for his mother, and showing her the Book of the Gospels she had given him in childhood, died in her arms. This happened about the middle of the fifth century. Some authors transfer to Rome the scenes of the closing years of this Saint.

=== Roman Martyrology ===
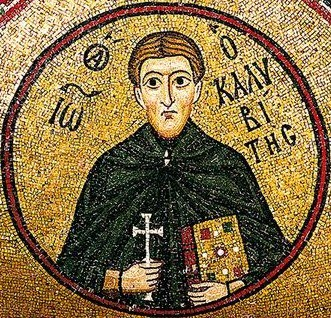
Mosaic of Saint John Calabytes from Hosios Loukas.

The Roman Martyrology includes:

January 23 ... In Rome, Saint John Calybite, who lived for some time unknown in a corner of his father's house, then in a cottage near it, in the isle of Tiber. His parents only recognized him at his death, in 469. Having then become celebrated by several miracles, he was interred in the same places, where a church was afterwards built in his honor.

=== Butler's account ===
The hagiographer Alban Butler (1710–1773) wrote in his Lives of the Primitive Fathers, Martyrs, and Other Principal Saints, under January 15,

St. John Calybite, Recluse He was the son of Eutropius, a rich nobleman in Constantinople. He secretly left home to become a monk among the Acæmetes. (Note: Papebroch supposes St. John Calybite to have made a long voyage at sea; but this circumstance seems to have no other foundation, than the mistake of those who place his birth at Rome, forgetting that Constantinople was then called New Rome. No mention is made of any long voyage in his genuine Greek acts, nor in the interpolated Latin. He sailed only three-score furlongs from Constantinople to the place called [Greek], and from the peaceful abode of the Acæmetes’ monks, ([Greek], or dwelling of peace,) opposite to Sosthenium on the Thracian shore, where the monastery of the Acæmetes stood. See Gyllius, and Jos. Assemani, in Calend. Univ. T. 6. p. 77.) After six years he returned disguised in the rags of a beggar, and subsisted by the charity of his parents, as a stranger, in a little hut near their house; hence he was called the Calybite. He sanctified his soul by wonderful patience, meekness, humility, mortification, and prayer. He discovered himself to his mother, in his agony, in the year 450, and, according to his request, was buried under his hut; but his parents built over his tomb a stately church, as the author of his life mentions. Cedrenus, who says it stood in the western quarter of the city, calls it the church of poor John; Zonaras, the church of St. John Calybite. An old church, standing near the bridge of the isle of the Tiber in Rome, which bore his name, according to an inscription there, was built by Pope Formosus, (who died in 896,) together with an hospital. From which circumstance Du Cange 5 infers, that the body of our saint, which is preserved in this church, was conveyed from Constantinople to Rome, before the broaching of the Iconoclast heresy under Leo the Isarian, in 706: but his head remained at Constantinople till after that city fell into the hands of the Latins, in 1204; soon after which it was brought to Besanzon in Burgundy, where it is kept in St. Stephen’s church, with a Greek inscription round the case. The church which bears the name of Saint John Calybite, at Rome, with the hospital, is now in the hands of religious men of the order of St. John of God. According to a MS. life, commended by Baronius, St. John Calybite flourished under Theodosius the Younger, who died in 450: Nicephorus says, under Leo, who was proclaimed emperor in 457; so that both accounts may be true. On his genuine Greek acts, see Lambecius, Bibl. Vind. t. 8. p. 228. 395; Bollandus, p. 1035, gives his Latin acts the same which we find in Greek at St. Germain-des-Prez. See Montfaucon, Bibl. Coislianæ, p. 196. Bollandus adds other Latin acts, to which he gives the preference. See also Papebroch, Comm. ad Januarium Græcum metricum, t. 1. Maij. Jos. Assemani, in Calendaria Univ. ad 15 Jan. t. 6. p. 76. Chatelain, p. 283, &c.

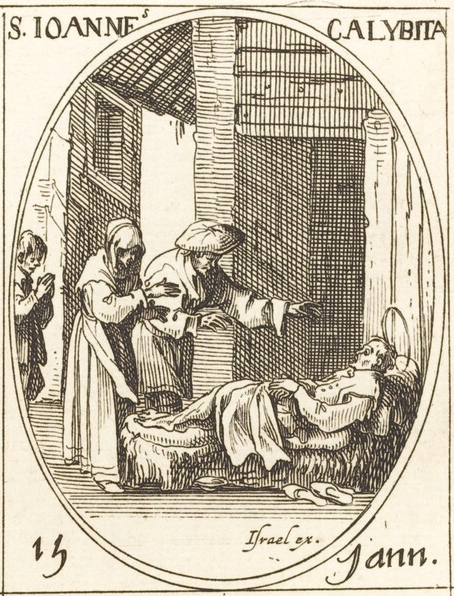
S. Jean Calybite (St. John Calabyte), January 15th, from Les Images De Tous Les Saincts et Saintes de L'Année - 1636.

== Veneration ==
In the Eastern Orthodox Church, he is commemorated on January 15. He is given the title "the Hut-Dweller", so his name is often rendered Saint John the Hut-Dweller in this tradition.

== Sources ==
- Butler, Alban (1868), The Lives of the Fathers, Martyrs, and Other Principal Saints, J. Duffy This article incorporates text from this source, which is in the public domain.
- "Saint John Calabytes", CatholicSaints.info, 14 January 2013
- St. Augustine's Abbey, Ramsgate (1921), The Book of saints : a dictionary of servants of God canonized by the Catholic Church, London: A. & C. Black, ltd. This article incorporates text from this source, which is in the public domain.
- The Roman and British Martyrology: Now First Translated, Literally, from the Latin Ed, O'Neill and Duggan, 1846 This article incorporates text from this source, which is in the public domain.
