= Charitina of Amisus =

Christian martyr

Saint Charitina of Amisus
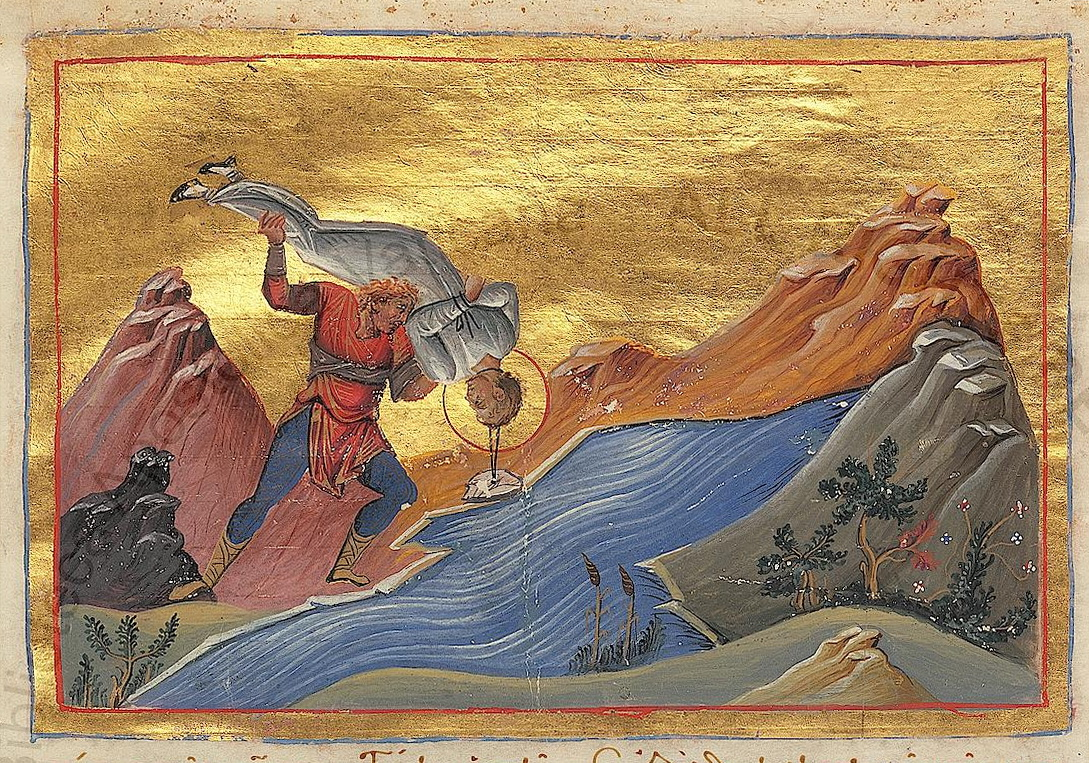
- Miniature from the Menologion of Basil II

Virgin and martyr
- Born: on or around 287 AD
- Died: 304 AD; Amisus on The Black Sea (modern-day Samsun, Turkey)
- Venerated in: Orthodox churches; Roman Catholic Church
- Feast: October 5

St. Charitina of Amisus (also known as Charitina of Rome) was a virgin martyr from Asia Minor, distinguished by strict chastity and piety. Charitina spent her life in fasting, prayer and study. By her example she converted many to Christianity during the reign of Emperor Diocletian and was seized in the city of Amisus in Pontus. After torture and death, her body was thrown into the sea in the year 304.

== Life ==
Charitina was born in Amisus around 287. Orphaned young, she was the servant of an eminent Christian man called Claudius the pious, who brought her up as his own daughter. The young woman was very pretty, sensible, and kind. She imparted her love for Christ to others, and by her example converted many. Charitina was meek, humble, obedient and silent. Although not as yet baptized, she was a Christian at heart. She studied the law of God and vowed to live in perpetual virginity as a bride of Christ.

The Emperor Diocletian's governor, Dometius, heard of her and sent soldiers to take her from her foster-father for trial. The judge asked her: "Is it true, little girl, that you are a Christian, and that you delude others by bringing them to this dishonourable faith?" Charitina courageously replied: "It is true that I am a Christian, and a lie that I delude others. I lead those in error to the way of truth, bringing them to my Christ."

The judge ordered that her hair be cut off and live coals put on her head, but the maiden was preserved by God's power. They threw her into the sea, but she clambered out saying, "This is my baptism." God delivered her from it. She was bound to a wheel, which began to turn, but an angel of God stopped the wheel and Charitina remained unharmed. Then the judge sent some dissolute youths to rape her. Fearing this dishonour, St Charitina prayed to God to receive her soul before these dissolute men could assault her and so, while she was kneeling in prayer, her soul left her body. St. Charitina died a martyr's death in the year 304.

The Martyrologium Romanum states that her martyrdom took place in Corycus in Cilicia Trachaea in Anatolia.

== Kontakion of St Charitina ==
Thou didst arm thy soul with faith and knowledge and put the enemy to open shame.
Thou didst stand before Christ in a robe dyed with thy blood and art now rejoicing with the Angels.
Pray for us, Martyr Charitina.

== Iconography ==
Charitina is represented with an angel extinguishing a funeral pyre.
