= September 22 =

September 22 this year in various calendars
- Tuesday, 22 September 2026
Akan	Nkyibene
Armenian	4 Sahmi 1476
Aztec	Tititl 15, 9 Calli
Babylonian	9 Ululu, 2337 SE
Balinese pawukon	Menga, Kajeng, Sri, Paing, Urukung, Anggara of Bala, Sri, Erangan, Suka
Bengali	7 Ashshin, BS 1433
Chinese	Yin Earth Pig・Tail Mansion; Fire Horse Year, Month 8, Day 12 (Bailu, 1 day until Qiufen)
Common Era	22 September 2026 CE
Coptic	12 Thout, AM 1743
Egyptian	9 Mechir, 2775 NE
Ethiopian	12 Maskaram, 2019 Amätä Məhrät
French Republican	La Fête de la Révolution de l'Année 234 de la République
Gregorian	22 September, AD 2026
Hebrew	11 Tishrei, AM 5787
Hindu	Uttarāṣāḍha・Atigaṇḍa; Solar: 6 Āśvina, 1948 SE; Lunisolar: Ekādaśī, Śukla pakṣa of Bhādrapada, 2083 VE; Rāudra・5127 KY・1,872,840
Icelandic	Þriðjudagur, 29 Tvímánuður 2026
Islamic	9 Rabi' al-thani, AH 1448 (using tabular method)
ISO week date	2026-W39-2
Japanese	12 Hazuki, Reiwa 8 (Hakuro, 1 day until Shūbun)
Julian	9 September, AD 2026 (AM 7534)
Julian day	2461306
Korean	12 Dakdal, 4359 DE
Maya	13.0.13.17.3; 16 Chen, 9 Akbal
Roman	ante diem V Idus Septembres, MMDCCLXXIX AUC
Solar Hijri	31 Shahrivar, SH 1405
Tibetan	11 khrums, me pho rta 2153 or 1772 or 1000

<<	September					>>
Su	Mo	Tu	We	Th	Fr	Sa
		1	2	3	4	5
6	7	8	9	10	11	12
13	14	15	16	17	18	19
20	21	22	23	24	25	26
27	28	29	30
2026

September 22 in recent years
2026 (Tuesday)
2025 (Monday)
2024 (Sunday)
2023 (Friday)
2022 (Thursday)
2021 (Wednesday)
2020 (Tuesday)
2019 (Sunday)
2018 (Saturday)
2017 (Friday)

September 22 is the 265th day of the year (266th in leap years) in the Gregorian calendar; 100 days remain until the end of the year.

== Events ==
=== Pre-1600 ===
- 904 – The warlord Zhu Quanzhong kills Emperor Zhaozong, the penultimate emperor of the Tang dynasty, after seizing control of the imperial government.
- 1236 – The Samogitians defeat the Livonian Brothers of the Sword in the Battle of Saule.
- 1359 – An Aragonese cavalry force defeats a superior Castilian cavalry force in the Battle of Araviana during the War of the Two Peters.
- 1499 – The Treaty of Basel concludes the Swabian War.
- 1586 – Eighty Years' War: A Spanish force led by the Marquis del Vasto successfully fights its way past a joint English/Dutch ambush in the Battle of Zutphen.

=== 1601–1900 ===
- 1692 – Martha Corey, Mary Eastey, Alice Parker, Mary Parker, Ann Pudeator, Wilmot Redd, Margaret Scott, and Samuel Wardwell are hanged, the last of those to be executed in the Salem witch trials.
- 1711 – The first attacks of the Tuscarora War begin in present-day North Carolina.
- 1726 – Bach leads the first performance of his cantata Wer Dank opfert, der preiset mich, BWV 17, in Leipzig.
- 1761 – George III and Charlotte of Mecklenburg-Strelitz are crowned King and Queen, respectively, of the Kingdom of Great Britain.
- 1776 – Nathan Hale is hanged for spying during the American Revolution.
- 1789 – The office of United States Postmaster General is established.
- 1789 – Battle of Rymnik: Alexander Suvorov's Russian and allied army defeats superior Ottoman Empire forces.
- 1792 – Primidi Vendémiaire of year one of the French Republican Calendar as the French First Republic comes into being.
- 1823 – Joseph Smith claims to have found the golden plates after being directed by God through the Angel Moroni to the place where they were buried.
- 1857 – The Russian warship Lefort capsizes and sinks during a storm in the Gulf of Finland, killing all 826 aboard.
- 1862 – A preliminary version of the Emancipation Proclamation is released by Abraham Lincoln.
- 1866 – The Battle of Curupayty is Paraguay's only significant victory in the Paraguayan War.
- 1885 – Lord Randolph Churchill makes a speech in Ulster in opposition to the Irish Home Rule movement.
- 1891 – The first hydropower plant of Finland is commissioned along the Tammerkoski rapids in Tampere, Pirkanmaa.
- 1892 – A locomotive shunting falls into a hole in the ground, leading to the burial of the locomotive.
- 1896 – Queen Victoria surpasses her grandfather King George III as the longest reigning monarch in British history (later surpassed by her great-great-granddaughter Elizabeth II on 9 September 2015).

=== 1901–present ===
- 1910 – The Duke of York's Picture House opens in Brighton, now the oldest continually operating cinema in Britain.
- 1914 – A German submarine sinks three British cruisers over a seventy-minute period, killing almost 1,500 sailors.
- 1919 – The steel strike of 1919, led by the Amalgamated Association of Iron and Steel Workers, begins in Pennsylvania before spreading across the United States.
- 1934 – The Gresford disaster in Wales kills 266 miners and rescuers.
- 1939 – World War II: A joint German–Soviet military parade in Brest-Litovsk is held to celebrate the successful invasion of Poland.
- 1941 – The Holocaust in Ukraine: On the Jewish New Year Day, the German SS murders 6,000 Jews in Vinnytsia, Ukraine. Those are the survivors of the previous killings that took place a few days earlier in which about 24,000 Jews were executed.
- 1948 – Gail Halvorsen officially starts parachuting candy to children as part of the Berlin Airlift.
- 1948 – Israeli-Palestine conflict: The All-Palestine Government is established by the Arab League.
- 1953 – The Four Level Interchange, first stack interchange in the world opened in Los Angeles.
- 1957 – In Haiti, François Duvalier is elected president.
- 1960 – The Sudanese Republic is renamed Mali after the withdrawal of Senegal from the Mali Federation.
- 1965 – The Indo-Pakistani War of 1965 between India and Pakistan over Kashmir ends after the United Nations calls for a ceasefire and after a last engagement near Dograi.
- 1966 – Twenty-four people are killed when Ansett-ANA Flight 149 crashes in Winton, Queensland, Australia.
- 1975 – Sara Jane Moore tries to assassinate U.S. President Gerald Ford, but is foiled by the Secret Service.
- 1976 – Red Dye No. 4 is banned by the US Food and Drug Administration after it is discovered that it causes tumors in the bladders of dogs.
- 1979 – A bright flash, resembling the detonation of a nuclear weapon, is observed near the Prince Edward Islands. Its cause is never determined.
- 1980 – Iraq invades Iran, sparking the nearly eight year Iran–Iraq War.
- 1981 – During a military exercise, a Turkish Air Force Northrop F-5 crashes in Babaeski as a result of pilot error, killing one crew member and also 65 soldiers on the ground.
- 1991 – The Dead Sea Scrolls are made available to the public for the first time.
- 1993 – A barge strikes a railroad bridge near Mobile, Alabama, causing the deadliest train wreck in Amtrak history. Forty-seven passengers are killed.
- 1993 – A Transair Georgian Airlines Tu-154 is shot down by a missile in Sukhumi, Georgia.
- 1995 – An E-3B AWACS crashes outside Elmendorf Air Force Base, Alaska after multiple bird strikes to two of the four engines soon after takeoff; all 24 on board are killed.
- 1995 – The Nagerkovil school bombing is carried out by the Sri Lanka Air Force in which at least 34 die, most of them ethnic Tamil schoolchildren.
- 2006 – Twenty-three people were killed in a maglev train collision in Lathen, Germany.
- 2013 – At least 75 people are killed in a suicide bombing at a Christian church in Peshawar, Pakistan.
- 2024 – Anura Kumara Dissanayake is elected as the 9th President Of Sri Lanka.

== Births ==
=== Pre-1600 ===
- 1013 – Richeza of Poland, Queen of Hungary (died 1075)
- 1211 – Ibn Khallikan, Iraqi scholar and judge (died 1282)
- 1373 – Thomas le Despenser, 1st Earl of Gloucester (died 1400)
- 1480 – Tenali Rama, poet in the court of Krishnadevaraya of the Vijayanagara Empire (died 1528)
- 1515 – Anne of Cleves, Queen consort of England (died 1557)
- 1547 – Philipp Nicodemus Frischlin, German philologist, mathematician, astronomer, and poet (died 1590)
- 1593 – Matthäus Merian, Swiss-German engraver and cartographer (died 1650)

=== 1601–1900 ===
- 1601 – Anne of Austria, Queen and regent of France (died 1666)
- 1606 – Li Zicheng, Chinese emperor (died 1645)
- 1680 – Barthold Heinrich Brockes, German poet (died 1747)
- 1694 – Philip Stanhope, 4th Earl of Chesterfield, English politician, Lord Lieutenant of Ireland (died 1773)
- 1715 – Jean-Étienne Guettard, French mineralogist and botanist (died 1786)
- 1741 – Peter Simon Pallas, German zoologist and botanist (died 1811)
- 1743 – Quintin Craufurd, Scottish author (died 1819)
- 1762 – Elizabeth Simcoe, English-Canadian painter and author (died 1850)
- 1765 – Paolo Ruffini, Italian mathematician and philosopher (died 1822)
- 1788 – Theodore Hook, English composer and educator (died 1841)
- 1791 – Michael Faraday, English physicist and chemist (died 1867)
- 1806 – Bernardino António Gomes, Portuguese physician and naturalist (died 1877)
- 1819 – Wilhelm Wattenbach, German historian and academic (died 1897)
- 1829 – Tự Đức, Vietnamese emperor (died 1883)
- 1833 – John Quincy Adams II, American politician and grandson of President John Quincy Adams (died 1894)
- 1833 – Stephen D. Lee, American general and academic (died 1908)
- 1835 – Alexander Potebnja, Ukrainian linguist and philosopher (died 1891)
- 1841 – Andrejs Pumpurs, Latvian soldier and poet (died 1902)
- 1862 – Anastasios Charalambis, Greek lieutenant and politician, Prime Minister of Greece (died 1949)
- 1868 – Louise McKinney, Canadian educator and politician (died 1931)
- 1870 – Charlotte Cooper, English-Scottish tennis player (died 1966)
- 1870 – Arthur Pryor, American trombonist, composer, and bandleader (died 1942)
- 1875 – Mikalojus Konstantinas Čiurlionis, Lithuanian painter and composer (died 1911)
- 1876 – André Tardieu, French journalist and politician, 67th Prime Minister of France (died 1945)
- 1878 – Shigeru Yoshida, Japanese politician and diplomat, 51st Prime Minister of Japan (died 1967)
- 1880 – Christabel Pankhurst, English activist, co-founded the Women's Social and Political Union (died 1958)
- 1882 – Wilhelm Keitel, German field marshal, head of the German armed forces (OKW), and convicted Nuremberg war criminal (died 1946)
- 1883 – Ferenc Oslay, Hungarian-Slovene historian and author (died 1932)
- 1883 – Frank George Woollard, English engineer (died 1957)
- 1885 – Gunnar Asplund, Swedish architect and academic, designed the Stockholm Public Library (died 1940)
- 1885 – Ben Chifley, Australian engineer and politician, 16th Prime Minister of Australia (died 1951)
- 1885 – Erich von Stroheim, Austrian-American actor, director, and screenwriter (died 1957)
- 1887 – Bhaurao Patil, Indian educator and activist (died 1959)
- 1889 – Hooks Dauss, American baseball player (died 1963)
- 1891 – Alma Thomas, American painter and educator (died 1978)
- 1892 – Billy West, American actor, director, and producer (died 1975)
- 1894 – Elisabeth Rethberg, German soprano (died 1976)
- 1895 – Paul Muni, Ukrainian-born American actor (died 1967)
- 1896 – Uri Zvi Greenberg, Ukrainian-Israeli poet and journalist (died 1981)
- 1896 – Henry Segrave, American-English race car driver (died 1930)
- 1897 – Frank O'Connor, American actor, rancher, and painter (died 1979)
- 1899 – Elsie Allen, Native American Pomo basket weaver (died 1990)
- 1900 – Paul Hugh Emmett, American chemist and engineer (died 1985)
- 1900 – William Spratling, American-Mexican silversmith and educator (died 1967)

=== 1901–present ===
- 1901 – Nadezhda Alliluyeva, second wife of Joseph Stalin (died 1932)
- 1901 – Charles Brenton Huggins, Canadian-American physician and physiologist, Nobel Prize laureate (died 1997)
- 1902 – John Houseman, Romanian-American actor and producer (died 1988)
- 1905 – Haakon Lie, Norwegian lawyer and politician (died 2009)
- 1905 – Eugen Sänger, Czech-Austrian engineer (died 1964)
- 1906 – Ilse Koch, German war criminal (died 1967)
- 1907 – Maurice Blanchot, French philosopher and author (died 2003)
- 1907 – Philip Fotheringham-Parker, English race car driver (died 1981)
- 1907 – Hermann Schlichting, German engineer and academic (died 1982)
- 1908 – Esphyr Slobodkina, Russian-American author and illustrator (died 2002)
- 1909 – John Engstead, American photographer and journalist (died 1983)
- 1909 – Allan Lane, American actor (died 1973)
- 1910 – György Faludy, Hungarian poet and author (died 2006)
- 1912 – Herbert Mataré, German physicist and academic (died 2011)
- 1912 – Martha Scott, American actress (died 2003)
- 1913 – Lillian Chestney, American painter and illustrator (died 2000)
- 1915 – Grigory Frid, Russian pianist and composer (died 2012)
- 1918 – Hans Scholl, German activist and co-founder of the anti-Nazi resistance group White Rose (died 1943)
- 1918 – Henryk Szeryng, Mexican violinist and educator (died 1988)
- 1920 – Eric Baker, English activist, co-founded Amnesty International (died 1976)
- 1920 – Anders Lassen, Danish-English soldier, Victoria Cross recipient (died 1945)
- 1920 – Bob Lemon, American baseball player and manager (died 2000)
- 1920 – William H. Riker, American political scientist and academic (died 1993)
- 1921 – Will Elder, American illustrator (died 2008)
- 1922 – David Sive, American environmentalist and lawyer (died 2014)
- 1923 – Dannie Abse, Welsh physician, poet, and author (died 2014)
- 1924 – Bernard Gauthier, French cyclist (died 2018)
- 1924 – Charles Keeping, English author and illustrator (died 1988)
- 1924 – Rosamunde Pilcher, English author (died 2019)
- 1924 – Charles Waterhouse, American painter, sculptor, and illustrator (died 2013)
- 1924 – J. William Middendorf, American soldier and politician, 14th United States Secretary of the Navy (died 2025)
- 1924 – Ray Wetzel, American trumpet player and composer (died 1951)
- 1925 – Virginia Capers, American actress and singer (died 2004)
- 1925 – Leila Hadley, American author (died 2009)
- 1926 – Bill Smith, American clarinet player and composer (died 2020)
- 1927 – Gordon Astall, English footballer and coach (died 2020)
- 1927 – Tommy Lasorda, American baseball player, coach, and manager (died 2021)
- 1928 – Eric Broadley, English engineer and businessman, founded Lola Cars (died 2017)
- 1928 – James Lawson, American activist, author, and academic (died 2024)
- 1928 – Eugene Roche, American actor (died 2004)
- 1928 – Johnny Valentine, American wrestler (died 2001)
- 1928 – Vitthalrao Gadgil, Indian politician (died 2001)
- 1929 – Serge Garant, Canadian composer and conductor (died 1986)
- 1929 – Carlo Ubbiali, Italian motorcycle racer (died 2020)
- 1930 – Joni James, American singer (died 2022)
- 1930 – T. S. Sinnathuray, Judge of the High Court of Singapore (died 2016)
- 1931 – Fay Weldon, English author and playwright (died 2023)
- 1931 – George Younger, 4th Viscount Younger of Leckie, Scottish banker and politician, Secretary of State for Defence (died 2003)
- 1932 – Algirdas Brazauskas, Lithuanian politician, 2nd President of Lithuania (died 2010)
- 1932 – Ingemar Johansson, Swedish boxer (died 2009)
- 1933 – Leonardo Balada, Spanish-American composer and educator
- 1933 – T. Cullen Davis, American businessman
- 1933 – Carmelo Simeone, Italian-Argentinian footballer (died 2014)
- 1933 – Jesco von Puttkamer, German-American engineer (died 2012)
- 1934 – Jack McGregor, American captain, lawyer, and politician
- 1934 – Lute Olson, American basketball player and coach (died 2020)
- 1934 – T. Somasekaram, Sri Lankan geographer and politician, 37th Surveyor General of Sri Lanka (died 2010)
- 1936 – Maurice Evans, English footballer and manager (died 2000)
- 1936 – Robin Gammell, Canadian actor
- 1937 – Don Rutherford, English rugby player (died 2016)
- 1938 – Gene Mingo, American football player
- 1939 – Bogdan Baltazar, Romanian economist and engineer (died 2012)
- 1939 – Deborah Lavin, South African-English historian and academic
- 1939 – Gilbert E. Patterson, American bishop (died 2007)
- 1939 – Marlena Shaw, American jazz singer (died 2024)
- 1939 – Junko Tabei, Japanese mountaineer (died 2016)
- 1939 – Tim Wirth, American politician (representing Colorado 1975-87), President of United Nations Foundation
- 1940 – Anna Karina, Danish-French actress, director, and screenwriter (died 2019)
- 1941 – Jeremiah Wright, American pastor and theologian
- 1942 – Ole Anderson, American wrestler (died 2024)
- 1942 – Candida Lycett Green, Anglo-Irish journalist and author (died 2014)
- 1942 – Rubén Salazar Gómez, Colombian cardinal
- 1942 – David Stern, American lawyer and businessman, 4th Commissioner of the NBA (died 2020)
- 1943 – Toni Basil, American singer-songwriter, dancer, and actress
- 1943 – Barry Cable, Australian footballer and coach
- 1943 – Paul Hoffert, American keyboard player, composer, and academic
- 1944 – Brian Gibson, English director, producer, and screenwriter (died 2004)
- 1945 – Paul Le Mat, American actor
- 1946 – King Sunny Adé, Nigerian singer-songwriter and guitarist
- 1946 – Larry Dierker, American baseball player and manager
- 1947 – Jo Beverley, English-Canadian author (died 2016)
- 1947 – David Drewry, English glaciologist and geophysicist
- 1947 – Norma McCorvey, American activist (died 2017)
- 1947 – Robert Morace, American author and academic
- 1948 – Denis Burke, Australian soldier and politician, 6th Chief Minister of the Northern Territory
- 1948 – Mark Phillips, English equestrian, trainer, and journalist
- 1949 – Harold Carmichael, American football player
- 1949 – James Cartwright, American general
- 1949 – Jim McGinty, Australian lawyer and politician, Attorney-General of Western Australia
- 1950 – Kirka, Finnish musician (died 2007)
- 1951 – David Coverdale, English singer-songwriter
- 1951 – Mike Graham, American wrestler and promoter (died 2012)
- 1951 – Doug Somers, American wrestler (died 2017)
- 1952 – Bob Goodlatte, American lawyer and politician
- 1952 – Oliver Mtukudzi, Zimbabwean Afro-Jazz and 'tuku' singer-songwriter and guitarist (died 2019)
- 1952 – Sukhumbhand Paribatra, Thai political scientist and politician, 15th Governor of Bangkok
- 1952 – Américo Rocca, Mexican wrestler
- 1953 – Richard Fairbrass, English singer-songwriter, musician and producer
- 1953 – Ségolène Royal, French politician
- 1955 – John O. Brennan, Director of the Central Intelligence Agency (2013-2017) under President Barack Obama
- 1955 – Jeffrey Leonard, American baseball player and coach
- 1956 – Debby Boone, American singer, actress, and author
- 1956 – Doug Wimbish, American singer-songwriter and bass player
- 1956 – Ibrahim Shema, Nigerian lawyer, politician
- 1957 – Steve Carney, English footballer (died 2013)
- 1957 – Nick Cave, Australian singer-songwriter, author, and actor
- 1957 – Mark Johnson, American ice hockey player and coach
- 1957 – Johnette Napolitano, American singer-songwriter and bass player
- 1957 – Giuseppe Saronni, Italian cyclist and manager
- 1958 – Andrea Bocelli, Italian singer-songwriter and producer
- 1958 – Beth Catlin, American autistic savant
- 1958 – Neil Cavuto, American journalist and author
- 1958 – Joan Jett, American singer-songwriter, guitarist, producer, and actress
- 1959 – Tai Babilonia, American figure skater and talk show host
- 1959 – Wally Backman, American baseball player
- 1959 – Saul Perlmutter, American astrophysicist, astronomer, and academic, Nobel Prize Laureate
- 1960 – Scott Baio, American actor
- 1961 – Vince Coleman, American baseball player
- 1961 – Liam Fox, Scottish physician and politician, Secretary of State for Defence
- 1961 – Bonnie Hunt, American actress, producer, and talk show host
- 1961 – Diane Lemieux, Canadian lawyer and politician
- 1961 – Catherine Oxenberg, American actress
- 1961 – Michael Torke, American composer
- 1962 – Martin Crowe, New Zealand cricketer and sportscaster (died 2016)
- 1964 – Juha Turunen, Finnish lawyer and politician
- 1964 – Ken Vandermark, American saxophonist and composer
- 1965 – Dan Bucatinsky, American actor, director, producer, and screenwriter
- 1965 – Andrii Deshchytsia, Ukrainian politician and diplomat, Ukrainian Minister of Foreign Affairs
- 1965 – Mark Guthrie, American baseball player
- 1965 – Robert Satcher, American physician, engineer, and astronaut
- 1966 – Ruth Jones, Welsh actress, producer, and screenwriter
- 1966 – Mike Richter, American ice hockey player
- 1966 – Michael Shank, American racing team owner
- 1967 – Matt Besser, American actor, director, producer, and screenwriter
- 1967 – Super Delfin, Japanese wrestler
- 1967 – Brian Keene, American novelist
- 1967 – Ian Mortimer, English historian and novelist
- 1967 – Rickard Rydell, Swedish race car driver
- 1967 – Félix Savón, Cuban boxer
- 1969 – Nicole Bradtke, Australian tennis player and sportscaster
- 1969 – Tuomas Kantelinen, Finnish composer and conductor
- 1969 – Sue Perkins, English comedian, actress, and radio host
- 1969 – Matt Sharp, American singer-songwriter and bass player
- 1970 – Gladys Berejiklian, Australian politician, 45th Premier of New South Wales
- 1970 – Mike Matheny, American baseball player and manager
- 1970 – Mystikal, American rapper and actor
- 1970 – Hitro Okesene, New Zealand rugby player and coach
- 1970 – Rupert Penry-Jones, English actor
- 1970 – Emmanuel Petit, French footballer
- 1971 – Elizabeth Bear, American author and poet
- 1971 – Toomas Krõm, Estonian footballer
- 1971 – Luther Reigns, American actor and wrestler
- 1973 – Yoo Chae-yeong, South Korean singer-songwriter and actress (died 2014)
- 1973 – Stéfan Louw, South African tenor and producer
- 1973 – Bob Sapp, American wrestler, kickboxer, mixed martial artist, and actor
- 1974 – Jenn Colella, American actress and singer
- 1974 – Kostas Kaiafas, Cypriot footballer and manager
- 1975 – Mireille Enos, American actress
- 1975 – Ethan Moreau, Canadian ice hockey player and scout
- 1976 – David Berkeley, American singer-songwriter and guitarist
- 1976 – Mo Collins, American football player and coach (died 2014)
- 1977 – Antti-Jussi Niemi, Finnish ice hockey player
- 1978 – Daniella Alonso, American actress and model
- 1978 – Harry Kewell, Australian footballer and coach
- 1979 – Emilie Autumn, American singer-songwriter, violinist, and poet
- 1979 – Swin Cash, American basketball player and executive
- 1979 – Michael Graziadei, American actor
- 1979 – Phil Waugh, Australian rugby player
- 1981 – Ashley Eckstein, American actress
- 1981 – Janne Niskala, Finnish ice hockey player
- 1981 – Alexei Ramírez, Cuban baseball player
- 1981 – Subaru Shibutani, Japanese singer-songwriter
- 1981 – Ingrid Vetlesen, Norwegian soprano
- 1982 – Katie Lowes, American actress
- 1982 – Billie Piper, English actress and singer
- 1982 – Maarten Stekelenburg, Dutch footballer
- 1983 – Glenn Loovens, Dutch professional footballer
- 1984 – Thiago Silva, Brazilian footballer
- 1985 – Jerma985, American internet personality
- 1985 – Faris Haroun, Belgian footballer
- 1985 – Jamie Mackie, Scottish footballer
- 1985 – Tatiana Maslany, Canadian actress
- 1985 – Ibragim Todashev, Russian-American mixed martial artist (died 2013)
- 1987 – Derick Brassard, Canadian ice hockey player
- 1987 – Stefan Denifl, Austrian cyclist
- 1987 – Tom Felton, English actor
- 1987 – Zdravko Kuzmanović, Serbian footballer
- 1987 – Teyonah Parris, American actress
- 1988 – Sana Saeed, Indian actress and model
- 1989 – Jon Bass, American actor
- 1989 – Kim Hyo-yeon, South Korean singer, dancer, and actress
- 1989 – Sabine Lisicki, German tennis player
- 1990 – Denard Robinson, American football player
- 1991 – Kenny Bromwich, New Zealand rugby league player
- 1992 – Philip Hindes, English track cyclist
- 1994 – Carlos Correa, Puerto Rican-American baseball player
- 1994 – Jinyoung, South Korean singer, actor, songwriter
- 1994 – Haason Reddick, American football player
- 1994 – Alexander Wennberg, Swedish ice hockey player
- 1995 – Nayeon, South Korean singer
- 1999 – Curry Barker, American filmmaker and actor
- 1999 – Kim Yo-han, South Korean singer and actor
- 1999 – Kim You-jung, South Korean actress
- 2000 – Louise Christie, British rhythm gymnast
- 2000 – Stephen Crichton, Samoan rugby league footballer
- 2000 – Seungmin, South Korean singer
- 2004 – Jessie Murph, American singer and songwriter
- 2009 – Coco Yoshizawa, Japanese skateboarder

== Deaths ==
=== Pre-1600 ===
- 189 – He Jin, Chinese general and regent (born 135)
- 530 – Pope Felix IV
- 904 – Zhao Zong, emperor of the Tang Dynasty (born 867)
- 967 – Wichmann II, Frankish nobleman
- 1072 – Ouyang Xiu, Chinese historian, poet, and politician (born 1007)
- 1158 – Otto of Freising, German bishop and chronicler (born c. 1114)
- 1174 – Uchtred, Lord of Galloway (born c. 1120)
- 1253 – Dōgen, Japanese monk and philosopher (born 1200)
- 1345 – Henry, 3rd Earl of Lancaster, English politician, Lord High Steward (born 1281)
- 1399 – Thomas de Mowbray, 1st Duke of Norfolk, English politician, Earl Marshal of The United Kingdom (born 1366)
- 1408 – John VII Palaiologos, Byzantine Emperor (born 1370)
- 1457 – Peter II, Duke of Brittany (born 1418)
- 1482 – Philibert I, Duke of Savoy (born 1465)
- 1520 – Selim I, Ottoman sultan (born 1465)
- 1531 – Louise of Savoy, French regent (born 1476)
- 1539 – Guru Nanak, Sikh religious leader, founded Sikhism (born 1469)
- 1554 – Francisco Vázquez de Coronado, Spanish explorer (born 1510)
- 1566 – Johannes Agricola, German theologian and academic (born 1494)
- 1576 – Walter Devereux, 1st Earl of Essex (born 1541)
- 1598 – Gabriel Spenser, English actor (born c. 1578)

=== 1601–1900 ===
- 1607 – Alessandro Allori, Italian painter and educator (born 1535)
- 1662 – John Biddle, English minister and theologian (born 1615)
- 1692 – Martha Corey, American woman accused of witchcraft (born 1620)
- 1703 – Vincenzo Viviani, Italian mathematician and physicist (born 1622)
- 1711 – William Bartram, English-born politician and settler (born 1674)
- 1756 – Abu l-Hasan Ali I, ruler of Tunisia (born 1688)
- 1774 – Pope Clement XIV (born 1705)
- 1776 – Nathan Hale, American soldier (born 1755)
- 1777 – John Bartram, American botanist and explorer (born 1699)
- 1852 – William Tierney Clark, English engineer, designed Hammersmith Bridge (born 1783)
- 1862 – Frederick Townsend Ward, American sailor and mercenary (born 1831)
- 1872 – Vladimir Dal, Russian lexicographer and linguist (born 1801)
- 1873 – Friedrich Frey-Herosé, Swiss lawyer and politician (born 1801)
- 1881 – Solomon L. Spink, American lawyer and politician (born 1831)

=== 1901–present ===
- 1914 – Alain-Fournier, French soldier and author (born 1886)
- 1917 – John Henry Knight, English engineer (born 1847)
- 1919 – Alajos Gáspár, Hungarian-Slovene author and poet (born 1848)
- 1933 – Sime Silverman, American journalist and newspaper publisher (born 1873)
- 1934 – Cecil Chubb, English barrister and last private owner of Stonehenge (born 1876)
- 1935 – Elliott Lewis, Australian politician, 19th Premier of Tasmania (born 1858)
- 1952 – Kaarlo Juho Ståhlberg, Finnish lawyer, judge, and politician, 1st President of Finland (born 1865)
- 1956 – Frederick Soddy, English chemist and economist, Nobel Prize laureate (born 1877)
- 1957 – Soemu Toyoda, Japanese admiral (born 1885)
- 1961 – Marion Davies, American actress and comedian (born 1897)
- 1969 – Adolfo López Mateos, Mexican politician, 48th President of Mexico (born 1909)
- 1973 – Paul van Zeeland, Belgian lawyer, economist, and politician, 38th Prime Minister of Belgium (born 1893)
- 1979 – Abul A'la Maududi, Pakistani theologian, Islamic scholar and jurist (born 1903)
- 1981 – Harry Warren, American composer and songwriter (born 1893)
- 1987 – Hákun Djurhuus, Faroese educator and politician, 4th Prime Minister of the Faroe Islands (born 1908)
- 1987 – Dan Rowan, American actor, comedian, and producer (born 1922)
- 1988 – Rais Amrohvi, Pakistani psychoanalyst, scholar, and poet (born 1914)
- 1989 – Ambrose Folorunsho Alli, Nigerian academic and politician (born 1929)
- 1989 – Irving Berlin, Russian-born American composer and songwriter (born 1888)
- 1992 – Aurelio López, Mexican baseball player (born 1948)
- 1993 – Maurice Abravanel, Greek-American pianist and conductor (born 1903)
- 1994 – Leonard Feather, English-American pianist, composer, producer, and journalist (born 1914)
- 1996 – Ludmilla Chiriaeff, Latvian-Canadian ballerina, choreographer, and director (born 1924)
- 1996 – Dorothy Lamour, American actress and singer (born 1914)
- 1999 – George C. Scott, American actor, director, and producer (born 1927)
- 2000 – Saburō Sakai, Japanese lieutenant and pilot (born 1916)
- 2001 – Isaac Stern, Polish-Ukrainian violinist and conductor (born 1920)
- 2002 – Jan de Hartog, Dutch-American author and playwright (born 1914)
- 2003 – Gordon Jump, American actor (born 1932)
- 2003 – Hugo Young, English journalist and author (born 1938)
- 2004 – Pete Schoening, American mountaineer (born 1927)
- 2004 – Ray Traylor Jr., American professional wrestler better-known as the Big Boss Man (born 1963)
- 2006 – Edward Albert, American actor (born 1951)
- 2006 – Carla Benschop, Dutch basketball player and educator (born 1950)
- 2007 – ʻAlí-Muhammad Varqá, last Hand of the Cause of God in the Baháʼí Faith (born 1911)
- 2007 – Marcel Marceau, French mime and actor (born 1923)
- 2008 – Thomas Dörflein, German zookeeper (born 1963)
- 2008 – Petrus Schaesberg, German painter, historian, and educator (born 1967)
- 2009 – Edward Delaney, Irish sculptor (born 1930)
- 2010 – Jackie Burroughs, British-born Canadian actress (born 1939)
- 2010 – Eddie Fisher, American singer (born 1928)
- 2010 – Vyacheslav Tsaryov, Russian footballer (born 1971)
- 2011 – Knut Steen, Norwegian sculptor (born 1924)
- 2012 – Hector Abhayavardhana, Sri Lankan theorist and academic (born 1919)
- 2012 – Irving Adler, American mathematician, author, and academic (born 1913)
- 2012 – Juan H. Cintrón García, Puerto Rican businessman and politician, 126th Mayor of Ponce (born 1919)
- 2012 – Grigory Frid, Russian pianist and composer (born 1915)
- 2012 – Jan Hendrik van den Berg, Dutch psychiatrist and academic (born 1914)
- 2013 – Gary Brandner, American author and screenwriter (born 1930)
- 2013 – Jane Connell, American actress and singer (born 1925)
- 2013 – David H. Hubel, Canadian-American neurophysiologist and academic, Nobel Prize laureate (born 1926)
- 2013 – Álvaro Mutis, Colombian-Mexican author and poet (born 1923)
- 2013 – Hans Erich Slany, German industrial designer, founded TEAMS Design (born 1926)
- 2013 – Luciano Vincenzoni, Italian screenwriter (born 1926)
- 2014 – Fernando Cabrita, Portuguese footballer and manager (born 1923)
- 2014 – Sahana Pradhan, Nepalese politician, Nepalese Minister of Foreign Affairs (born 1927)
- 2014 – Erik van der Wurff, Dutch pianist, composer, and conductor (born 1945)
- 2014 – Hans E. Wallman, Swedish director, producer, and composer (born 1936)
- 2015 – Yogi Berra, American baseball player, coach, and manager (born 1925)
- 2016 – Delphine Medjo, Cameroonian politician (born 1941)
- 2018 – Chas Hodges, English musician and singer (born 1943)
- 2018 – Edna Molewa, South African politician (born 1957)
- 2020 – Neil Brannon, American politician (born 1940)
- 2022 – Carlos Balá, Argentine actor and comedian (born 1925)
- 2022 – Hilary Mantel, British author (born 1952)
- 2022 – Pal Singh Purewal, Punjabi engineer, author, scholar, and teacher (born 1931/1932)
- 2023 – Altemio Sanchez, Puerto Rican serial killer and rapist (born 1958)
- 2024 – Roy Clay, American computer scientist (born 1929)
- 2024 – Fredric Jameson, American academic and literary critic (born 1934)

== Holidays and observances ==
- American Business Women's Day (United States)
- Baltic Unity Day (Lithuania, Latvia)
- Christian feast days:
  - Digna and Emerita
  - Emmeram of Regensburg
  - Felix and Constantia
  - Ignatius of Santhià (Lorenzo Maurizio Belvisotti)
  - Laud of Coutances
  - Paul Chong Hasang (one of The Korean Martyrs)
  - Phocas (the Gardener, or of Sinope)
  - Phocas, Bishop of Sinope
  - Sadalberga
  - Septimius of Iesi (this date since 1623)
  - Theban Legion, including:
    - Candidus
    - Maurice (Western Christianity)
  - Philander Chase (Episcopal Church)
  - September 22 (Eastern Orthodox liturgics)
- Earliest date for the autumnal equinox in the Northern Hemisphere and the vernal equinox in the Southern Hemisphere:
  - Autumnal Equinox Day (Japan)
  - Mabon in the Northern Hemisphere, Ostara in the Southern Hemisphere. (Neopagan Wheel of the Year)
  - The first day of Miķeļi (Latvia)
- Independence Day, celebrates the independence of Bulgaria from the Ottoman Empire in 1908.
- Independence Day, celebrates the independence of Mali from France in 1960.
- Resistance Fighting Day (Estonia)
