= Cosmas of Alexandria =

Cosmas of Alexandria may refer to:

- Pope Cosmas I of Alexandria, ruled in 729–730
- Patriarch Cosmas I of Alexandria, Greek Patriarch of Alexandria in 727–768
- Patriarch Cosmas II of Alexandria, Greek Patriarch of Alexandria in 1723–1736
- Patriarch Cosmas III of Alexandria, Greek Patriarch of Alexandria in 1737–1746
