= Patriarch Cosmas =

Patriarch Cosmas may refer to:

- Cosmas I of Alexandria, Greek Patriarch of Alexandria in 727–768
- Cosmas I of Constantinople, Ecumenical Patriarch in 1075–1081
- Cosmas II of Constantinople, Ecumenical Patriarch in 1146–1147
- Cosmas II of Alexandria, Greek Patriarch of Alexandria in 1723–1736
- Cosmas III of Constantinople, Ecumenical Patriarch in 1714–1716
- Cosmas III of Alexandria, Greek Patriarch of Alexandria in 1737–1746
