= Patriarch Cosmas III =

Patriarch Cosmas III may refer to:

- Cosmas III of Constantinople, Ecumenical Patriarch in 1714–1716
- Cosmas III of Alexandria, Greek Patriarch of Alexandria in 1737–1746
