= Cosmas III =

Cosmas III may refer to:

- Pope Cosmas III of Alexandria, ruled in 920–932
- Cosmas III of Constantinople, Ecumenical Patriarch in 1714–1716
- Cosmas III of Alexandria, Greek Patriarch of Alexandria in 1737–1746
