= September 21 (Eastern Orthodox liturgics) =

Day in the Eastern Orthodox liturgical calendar

Eastern Orthodox liturgical calendar
September 20	September 21	September 22
September 21 O.S. ≍ October 4 N.S. September 21 N.S ≍ September 8 O.S.

An Eastern Orthodox cross

September 21 in Eastern Orthodox liturgical calendars is a feast day and a day of commemoration of saints and martyrs. Although some Orthodox churches use the Revised Julian Calendar and others use the traditional Julian calendar, the fixed commemorations for their respective September 21 are broadly the same, no matter which calendar is used. (Note: Despite the dates being the same, the days to which they refer typically differ by 13 days. The notation Old Style or O.S. is sometimes used to indicate a date in the traditional Julian Calendar (the "Old Calendar"). The notation New Style or N.S. indicates a date in the Revised Julian calendar (the "New Calendar").)

== Feasts ==
- Apodosis of the Exaltation of the Cross.

== Saints ==
- Prophet Jonah (8th century BC) (Note: "In the land of Saar, the holy prophet Jonas, who was buried in Geth.") (see also: September 22)
- Apostle Quadratus of the Seventy, Apologist (c. 130)
- Martyr Eusebius of Phoenicia (2nd century) (Note: "In Phoenicia, St. Eusebius, martyr, who, of his own accord, went to the prefect, and declaring himself a Christian, was subjected by him to many torments, and finally beheaded.")
- Holy Six Martyrs, by the sword (298)
- Martyr Priscus of Phrygia.
- Martyrs Eusebius, Nestabus, Zeno, brothers, with Nestor and Busiris, of Gaza (360-363)
- Martyr Bassa of Tyre. (Note: Her memory is recorded in the Synaxarion of Sirmond, with the phrase: (in Greek) «Τῇ αὕτῃ ἥμερᾳ τῆς ἁγίας μάρτυρος Βάσσης τῆς Τυρίας». (It is unclear if "Tyria" refers to either "Tyre, Lebanon", or to "Tyros, Greece").)
- Hieromartyr Hypatius, Bishop of Ephesus, and his Presbyter Andrew (730) (see also: September 20)
- Venerable Jonah the Sabbaite, the Presbiter (9th century), father of Sts. Theophanes the Hymnographer and Theodore Graptus (see also: September 22 )
- Venerables Isaacius (Akakios) and Meletius, Bishops of Sitis (Σίτης) in Cyprus. (Note: "In Cyprus, St. Isacius, bishop and martyr. In the same place, St. Meletius, bishop and confessor." Venerable Meletius is also listed on September 20.)

== Pre-Schism Western saints ==
- Saint Alexander, a bishop in the neighbourhood of Rome (2nd century) (Note: His miracles attracted the attention of the people and he was arrested and martyred on the Claudian Way, some twenty miles from Rome. His relics were enshrined in Rome.) (Note: "At twenty miles from Rome, on the Claudian way, the martyrdom of St. Alexander, bishop, in the time of the emperor Antoninus. For the faith of Christ he was loaded with fetters scourged, tortured, burned with torches, torn with iron hooks, exposed to the beasts and cast into the flames, but having overcome all these torments, he was finally beheaded, and so attained the glory of eternal life. His body was afterwards carried into the city by the blessed pope Damasus, on the 26th of November, on which day his feast is to be celebrated by order of the same Pontiff.")
- Saint Pamphilus, a martyr in Rome.
- Saint Mabyn (Mabena), a Cornish saint (6th century) (Note: Born either in Wales or else in Cornwall, preached Christ with St Teilo.)
- Saint Gerulfus (Gerulph), a saint of Flanders (c. 746) (Note: Born in Flanders in Belgium, he was heir to a vast estate, but was treacherously murdered by a relative who hoped to succeed to his inheritance. He died with words of forgiveness on his lips.)
- Saint Maura, a holy virgin in Troyes, she reposed at the age of twenty-three after a life of prayer and good works (850)

== Post-Schism Orthodox saints ==
- Venerable Daniel, founder of Shuzhgorsk Monastery, Belozersk (16th century)
- Saint Joseph, founder of Zaonikiev Monastery, Vologda (1612) (Note: See: (in Russian) Иосиф Заоникиевский. Википедии. (Russian Wikipedia).)

=== New martyrs and confessors ===
- New Hieromartyrs Alexander Fedoseyev, Alexis Stabnikov, Constantine Shirokinsky, and John Flerov, Priests (1918)
- New Hieromartyr Archimandrite Platon (Aivazidis), Protosyncellus of Metropolitan Germanos Karavangelis of Amasya (1921) (Note: On October 3, 2019, the Holy Synod of the Patriarchate of Constantinople resolved to glorify seven New Martyrs of Kastoria, including New Hieromartyr Archimandrite Platon (Aivazidis). See: (in Greek) Πλάτων Αϊβαζίδης. Βικιπαίδεια. (Greek Wikipedia).) (Note: He was glorified at the proposal of Metropolitan Seraphim (Papakostas) of Kastoria, along with other martyrs of Kastoria. The resolution of the Holy Synod of the Ecumenical Patriarchate on October 3, 2019, was as follows: (in Greek) α) Ἀπεφασίσθη, τῇ εἰσηγήσει τῆς Κανονικῆς Ἐπιτροπῆς, κατόπιν θεωρήσεως τοῦ ἁρμοδίως διαβιβασθέντος τῇ Μητρί Ἐκκλησίᾳ σχετικοῦ αἰτήματος τοῦ Σεβ. Μητροπολίτου Καστορίας κ. Σεραφείμ, ἡ ἀναγραφή εἰς τό Ἁγιολόγιον τῆς Ὀρθοδόξου Ἐκκλησίας τῶν μαρτυρικῶς τελειωθέντων ὑπέρ τῆς ἀμωμήτου ἡμῶν πίστεως: α) Μάρκου Πέτρου Μαρκούλη ἐκ Κλεισούρας, β) Νούλτζου ἐκ Καστορίας, καί τῶν σύν αὐτῷ ἀθλησάντων, γ) Γεωργίου τοῦ ἐκ Καστορίας, δ) ἱερέως Βασιλείου Καλαπαλίκη, ἐφημερίου Χιλιοδεντρίου Καστορίας καί ε) Ἀρχιμανδρίτου Πλάτωνος Ἀϊβαζίδη.)
- New Hieromartyr Theophan (Tuliakov), Metropolitan of Lipetsk and Belorussia (1937) (Note: See: (in Russian) Феофан (Туляков). Википедии. (Russian Wikipedia).)
- New Hieromartyr Maurice (Poletaev), Archimandrite, of Yuriev-Polsky, and with him Martyr Basil Kondratiev (1937)
- New Hieromartyrs Valentine Nikolsky, Alexander Belyakov, John Lazarev, Andrew Benedictov, Peter Sakharovsky, and John Nikolsky, Priests (1937)
- New Hieromartyr John Bystrov, Priest (1938)
- New Hieromartyr Basil Krymkin, Priest (1942)

== Other commemorations ==
- Uncovering of the relics (1752) of St. Demetrius, Metropolitan of Rostov (1709)
- Repose of Arseny (Chagovstsov), Archbishop of Winnipeg (1945) (Note: During its October 2004 holy synod meeting, bishops of the OCA established a glorification commission to inquire into the possibility for adding Abp. Arseny to the calendar of saints.)
- Repose of Priest Dumitru Staniloae of Romania (1993)
- Synaxis of the Saints of Uglich.
- Synaxis of the Church of "Panagia Giatrissa" ("The Healer"), on Therasia in the Greek Cyclades (1950s)

== Icon gallery ==
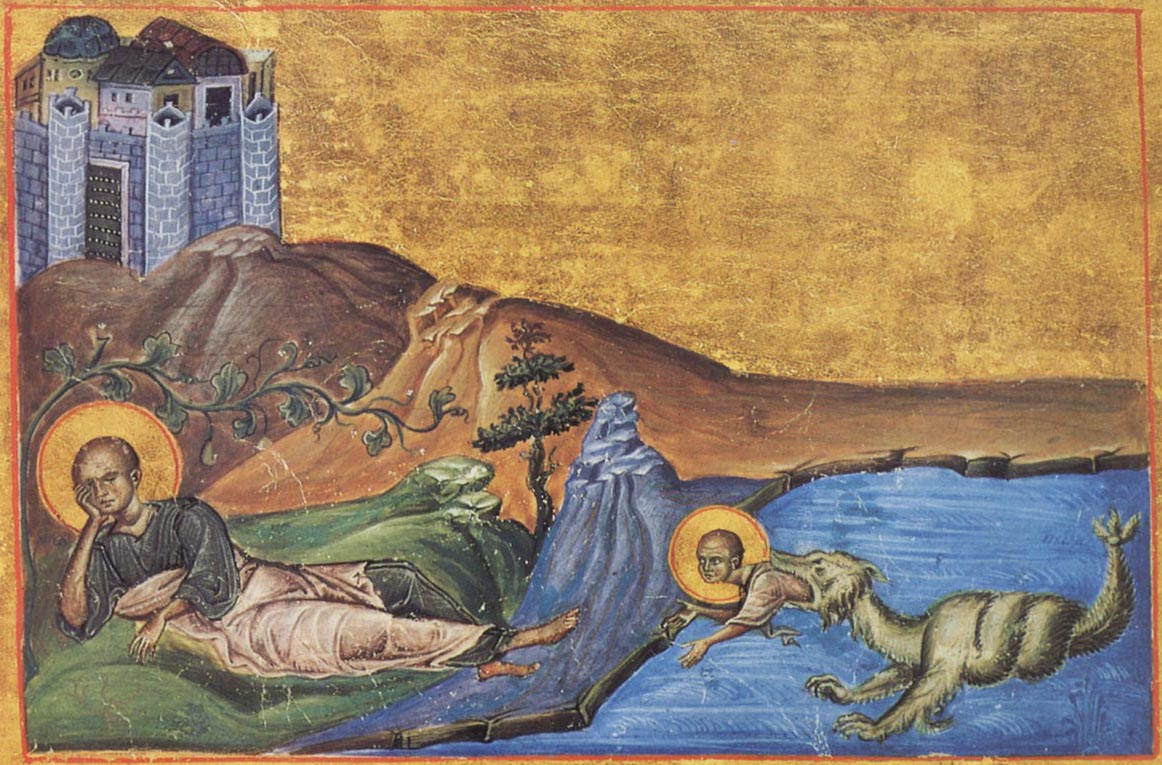
Prophet Jonah.
(Menologion of Basil II, 10th century).

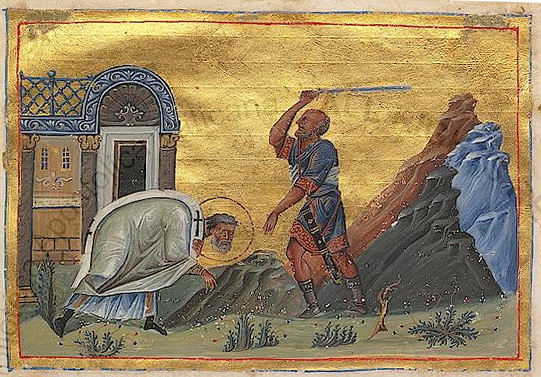
Apostle Quadratus of the Seventy.
(Menologion of Basil II, 10th century).

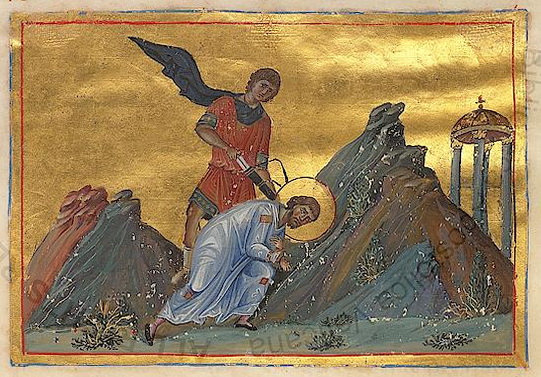
Martyr Priscus of Phrygia.
(Menologion of Basil II, 10th century).

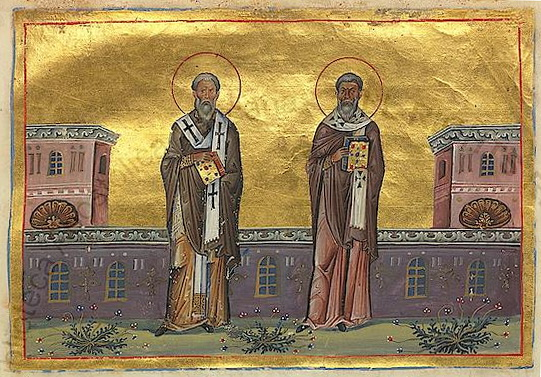
Venerables Isaac and Meletius of Cyprus.
(Menologion of Basil II, 10th century).

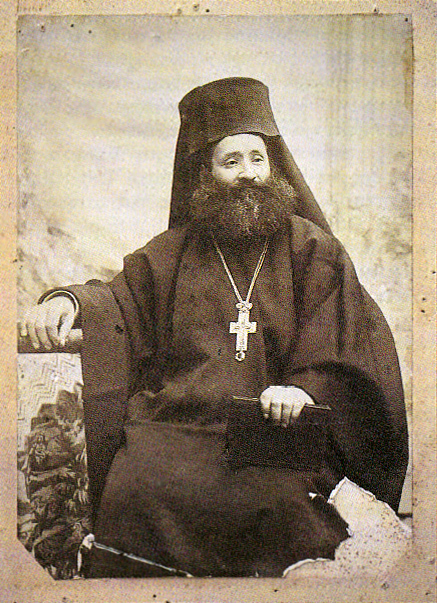
New Hieromartyr Platon (Aivazidis) of Amasya.

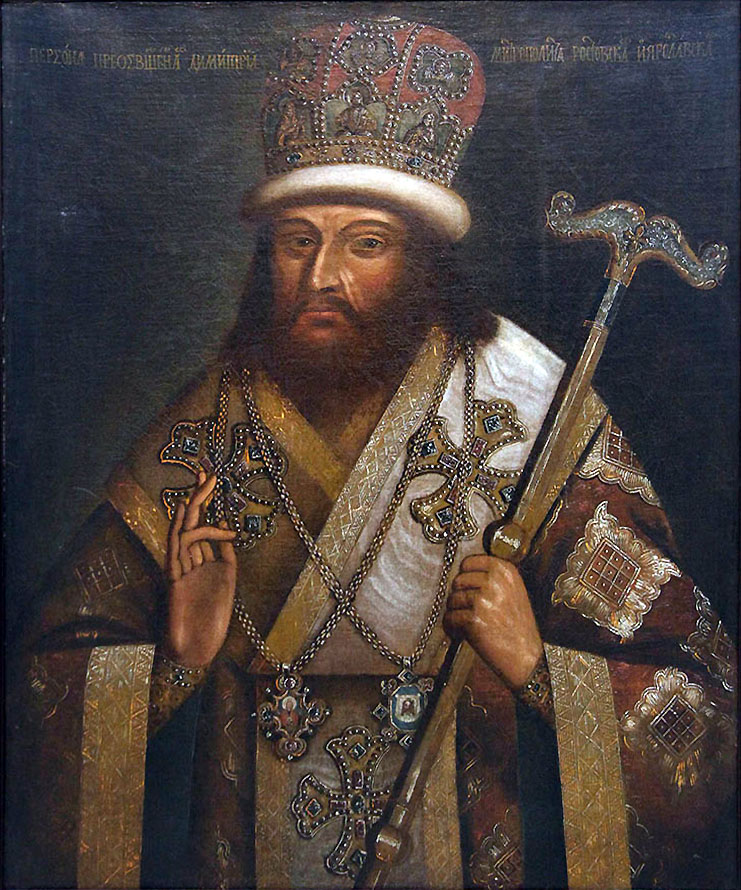
St. Demetrius of Rostov.

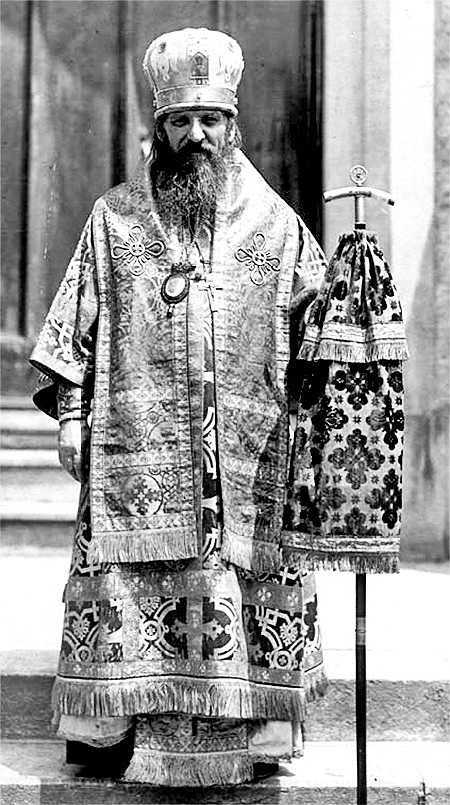
Abp. Arseny (Chagovstsov) of Winnipeg.

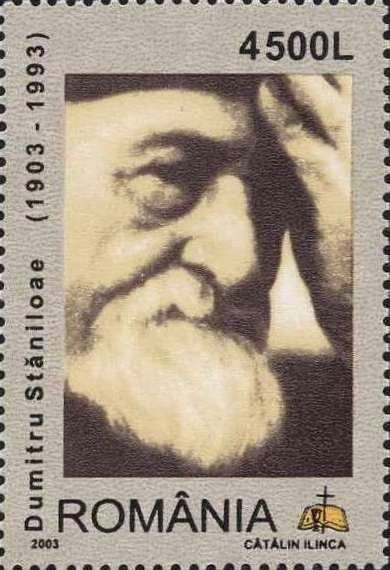
Priest Dumitru Staniloae.

== Sources ==
- September 21/October 4. Orthodox Calendar (PRAVOSLAVIE.RU).
- October 4 / September 21. HOLY TRINITY RUSSIAN ORTHODOX CHURCH (A parish of the Patriarchate of Moscow).
- September 21. OCA - The Lives of the Saints.
- The Autonomous Orthodox Metropolia of Western Europe and the Americas (ROCOR). St. Hilarion Calendar of Saints for the year of our Lord 2004. St. Hilarion Press (Austin, TX). pp. 70–71.
- The Twenty-First Day of the Month of September. Orthodoxy in China.
- September 21. Latin Saints of the Orthodox Patriarchate of Rome.
- The Roman Martyrology. Transl. by the Archbishop of Baltimore. Last Edition, According to the Copy Printed at Rome in 1914. Revised Edition, with the Imprimatur of His Eminence Cardinal Gibbons. Baltimore: John Murphy Company, 1916. pp. 291–292.
- Rev. Richard Stanton. A Menology of England and Wales, or, Brief Memorials of the Ancient British and English Saints Arranged According to the Calendar, Together with the Martyrs of the 16th and 17th Centuries. London: Burns & Oates, 1892. pp. 454–455.

Greek Sources

- Great Synaxaristes: (in Greek) 21 ΣΕΠΤΕΜΒΡΙΟΥ. ΜΕΓΑΣ ΣΥΝΑΞΑΡΙΣΤΗΣ.
- (in Greek) Συναξαριστής. 21 Σεπτεμβρίου. ECCLESIA.GR. (H ΕΚΚΛΗΣΙΑ ΤΗΣ ΕΛΛΑΔΟΣ).
- (in Greek) 21/09/2016. Ορθόδοξος Συναξαριστής.

Russian Sources

- (in Russian) 4 октября (21 сентября). Православная Энциклопедия под редакцией Патриарха Московского и всея Руси Кирилла (электронная версия). (Orthodox Encyclopedia - Pravenc.ru).
- (in Russian) 21 сентября по старому стилю / 4 октября по новому стилю. Русская Православная Церковь - Православный церковный календарь на 2016 год.
