= Phocas (disambiguation) =

Phocas or Phokas (from Greek: Φωκάς) may refer to:

- Saint Phocas, Bishop of Sinope
- Saint Phocas, a 4th-century Christian martyr
- Flavius Phocas, Byzantine emperor from 602–610
- John Phokas, 12th-century pilgrim and writer
- Phokas (Byzantine family), Byzantine nobles including:
  - Nikephoros Phokas the Elder, general
  - Leo Phokas the Elder, son of Nikephoros, general
  - Bardas Phokas the Elder, son of Nikephoros, general
  - Nikephoros II Phokas, son of Bardas, Byzantine emperor from 963–969
  - Leo Phokas the Younger, son of Bardas, general and curopalates
  - Bardas Phokas the Younger, son of Leo, general and rebel against Basil II
