= Patriarch Cosmas II =

Patriarch Cosmas II may refer to:

- Cosmas II of Constantinople, Ecumenical Patriarch in 1146–1147
- Cosmas II of Alexandria, Greek Patriarch of Alexandria in 1723–1736
