= January 16 (Eastern Orthodox liturgics) =

Day in the Eastern Orthodox liturgical calendar

Eastern Orthodox liturgical calendar
January 15	January 16	January 17
January 16 O.S. ≍ January 29 N.S. January 16 N.S ≍ January 3 O.S.

An Eastern Orthodox cross

January 16 in Eastern Orthodox liturgical calendars is a feast day and a day of commemoration of saints and martyrs. Although some Orthodox churches use the Revised Julian Calendar and others use the traditional Julian calendar, the fixed commemorations for their respective January 16 are broadly the same, no matter which calendar is used. (Note: Despite the dates being the same, the days to which they refer typically differ by 13 days. The notation Old Style or O.S. is sometimes used to indicate a date in the traditional Julian Calendar (the "Old Calendar"). The notation New Style or N.S, indicates a date in the Revised Julian calendar (the "New Calendar").)

== Saints ==
- Veneration of the Precious Chains of the holy and all-glorious Apostle Peter (Liberation of Saint Peter). (Note: Acts 12:1-11; John 21:15-25.)
- Martyrs Speusippus, Eleusippus, and Melapsippus, Cappadocian triplets, and their grandmother Leonilla, and with them Neon, Turbo, and Jonilla (Jovilla), in Cappadocia (c. 161-180)
- Martyr Danax the Reader of Avlona, Illyria (2nd century) (see also: January 15)

== Pre-Schism Western saints ==
- Saint Priscilla, of the Roman Glabrio family, who hosted Saint Peter c. AD 42 (1st century) (Note: The wife of Manius Acilius Glabrio and mother of the Senator Pudens. The tradition is that she was the hostess in Rome of the Apostle Peter. His headquarters were at her villa near the Roman catacombs which to this day bear her name - Catacomb of Priscilla.)
- Pope Marcellus I, Pope of Rome from 308 to 309, suffered for confessing the faith (309) (see also: June 7, in the East)
- Venerable Honoratus, Archbishop of Arles and Founder of Lerins Monastery (429) (Note: Probably born in Lorraine of a Roman consular family, he renounced paganism in his youth and went to the East to learn from monasticism. Returning to France, he founded a monastery on the Mediterranean island of Lérins. In 426 he was forced to become Archbishop of Arles, but reposed three years later.)
- Saint James, first Bishop of Tarentaise (429) (Note: A Syrian by origin, he became a monk with St. Honoratus at Lérins and was venerated at Chambéry as an Apostle of Savoy in France and the first Bishop of Tarentaise.)
- Saint Valerius, Bishop of Sorrento (c. 453) (Note: A hermit taken from his solitude by the people of Sorrento in Italy, who made him their bishop.)
- Saint Liberata, sister of Saint Epiphanius of Pavia, Italy and Saint Honorata of Pavia (5th century)
- Saint Honoratus of Fondi, founder of the monastery of Fondi in Italy (6th century)
- Saint Triverius (Trevor), hermit (550) (Note: Born in Neustria, he showed spiritual sensitivity from childhood. He lived as a hermit near the monastery of Thérouanne until he moved to Dombes. The village of Saint Trivier in France commemorates his name.)
- Saint Tozzo (Tazzo, Thosso), Bishop of Augsburg (661)
- Saint Fulgentius, Bishop of Cartagena and Ecija (Astigi), Hispania (633) (Note: Brother of Sts Isidore and Leander of Seville in Spain and of St. Florentina. He was Bishop of Ecija in Andalusia and one of the leaders of the Spanish Church of that time.)
- Martyr Sigeberht of East Anglia, King of the East Angles (635) (see also: January 25)
- Saint Fursey, Irish missionary monk of Burgh Castle (East Anglia), Lagny, and Peronne (Gaul) (650) (Note: Having founded a monastery at Rathmat in Ireland, he went to England and founded another at Burgh Castle in Suffolk. He finally moved to France and founded a monastery at Lagny near Paris. He was buried in Picardy. His life is famous for his remarkable visions of the afterlife.) (Note: "St. Fursey was favoured with various heavenly visions, in which the eternal truths of religion were indelibly impressed on his soul.")
- Saint Titian of Oderzo, for thirty years a Bishop near Venice in Italy (650)
- Saint Ferréol (Ferreolus, Fergéol), Bishop of Grenoble (c. 670)
- Saint Dunchaid O'Braoin (Dúnchad ua Bráein), Abbot of Clonmacnoise (988) (Note: Born in Westmeath in Ireland, he lived as a hermit near the monastery of Clonmacnoise until the year 969, when he became abbot there.)

== Post-Schism Orthodox saints ==
- Venerable Romilus the Sinaite, the Hesychast of Mount Athos and Ravanica Monastery, Serbia, disciple of Saint Gregory of Sinai, and with him Saints Nestor, Martinius, Daniel, Sisoes, Zosimas, and Gregory (1375)
- Blessed Maximus the Fool for Christ and Wonderworker of Totma, Vologda Oblast (1650) (Note: See: (in Russian) Максим Тотемский. Википедии. (Russian Wikipedia).)
- Saint Gerasimos II Palladas, Patriarch of Alexandria (1714)
- Saint Jacob (Pospelov), Archimandrite, of the Kirillo-Belozersky Monastery (1896) (see also: September 22 - Synaxis of the Saints of Tula)
- Saint Demetrios Gagastathis (Papa-Demetrios Gagastathis), "Man-of-God", of the St. Nicholas Church in Platanos, Trikala (gr), Greece (1975) (Note: He was formally glorified by the Ecumenical Patriarchate on August 31, 2025. The official communiqué of the Ecumenical Patriarchate was as follows: (in Greek) "Τό ἑσπέρας τοῦ Σαββάτου, ὑπεγράφη ὑπό τῆς Α. Θ. Παναγιότητος, τοῦ Οἰκουμενικοῦ Πατριάρχου κ. κ. Βαρθολομαίου καί τῶν ἁγίων Συνοδικῶν Ἀρχιερέων, εἰς εἰδικήν πρός τοῦτο Ἱεράν Ἀκολουθίαν, ἐν τῷ Πανσέπτῳ Πατριαρχικῶ Ναῷ τοῦ Ἁγίου Μεγαλομάρτυρος Γεωργίου τοῦ Τροπαιοφόρου, ἡ ἐν τῷ Ἱερῷ Κώδικι τῆς Ἁγίας τοῦ Χριστοῦ Μεγάλης Ἐκκλησίας καταστρωθεῖσα Πατριαρχική καί Συνοδική Πρᾶξις Ἁγιοκατάξεως τοῦ μακαρίου Πρεσβυτέρου Δημητρίου Γκαγκαστάθη.") (Note: He was eulogized in 1975 by Abbot Emilianos (Vafidis) of the Holy Monastery of Simonos Petras, as a simple married priest who, he said, "walked among us but his 'association was in the heavens'" [Philippians 3:20].) (Note: See: (in Greek) Άγιος Δημήτριος Γκαγκαστάθης. Βικιπαίδεια. (Greek Wikipedia).) (see also: January 29 - N.S.)

=== New martyrs and confessors ===
- New Hieromartyr Damascene of Gabrovo, Bulgaria, Hieromonk of Hilandar, Mount Athos, at Svishtovo, Bulgaria (1771)
- New Hieromartyr Nicholas, Priest of Mytilene (1777)
- New Hieromartyr John Pettaya, Priest (1919)

== Other commemorations ==
- Repose of Elder Theodore of Irkutsk (1923)

== Icon gallery ==
Veneration of the Precious Chains of the holy and all-glorious Apostle Peter.
(Menologion of Basil II, 10th century).

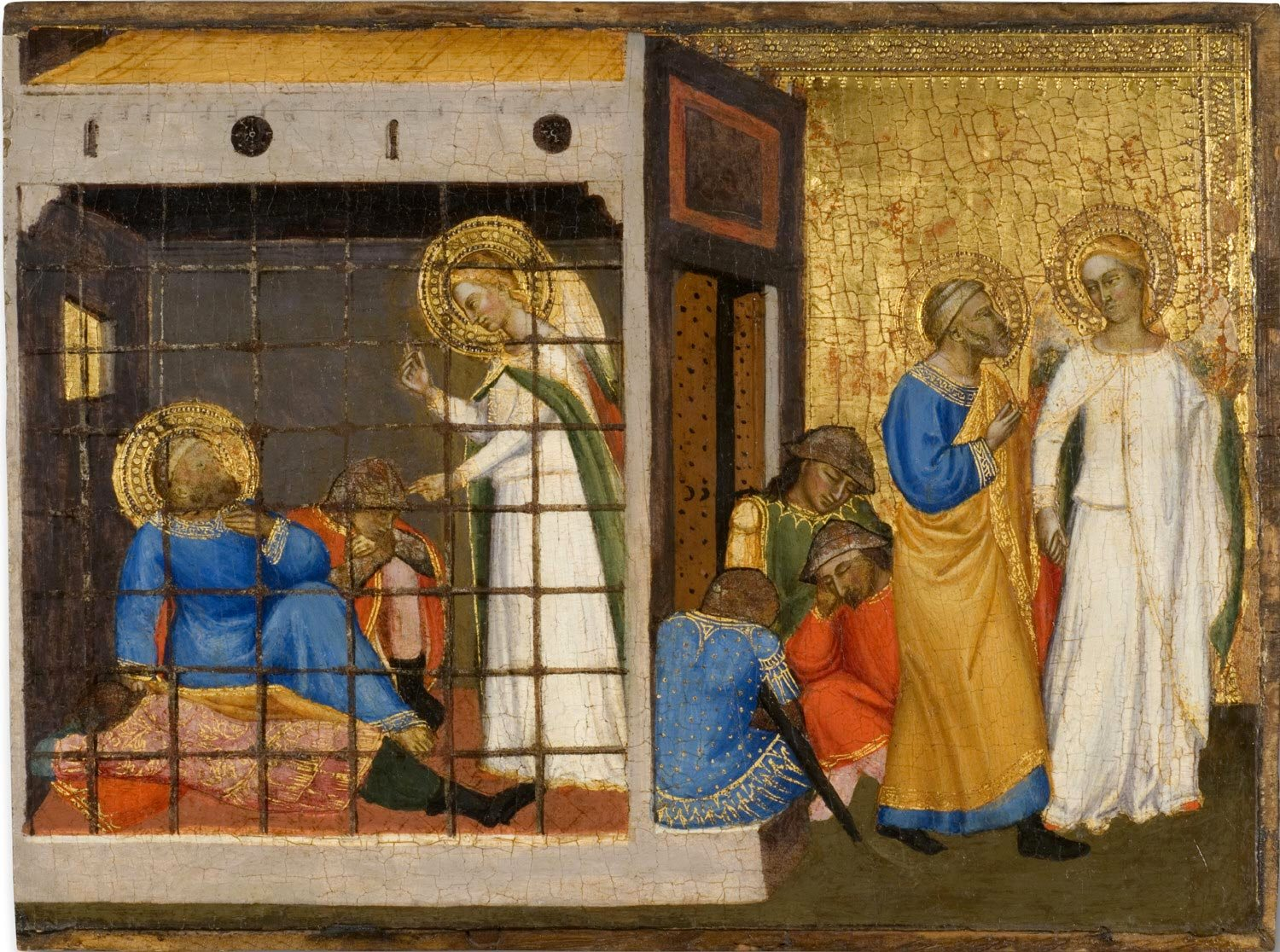
Liberation of Saint Peter.
(Jacopo di Cione, 1370–1371).

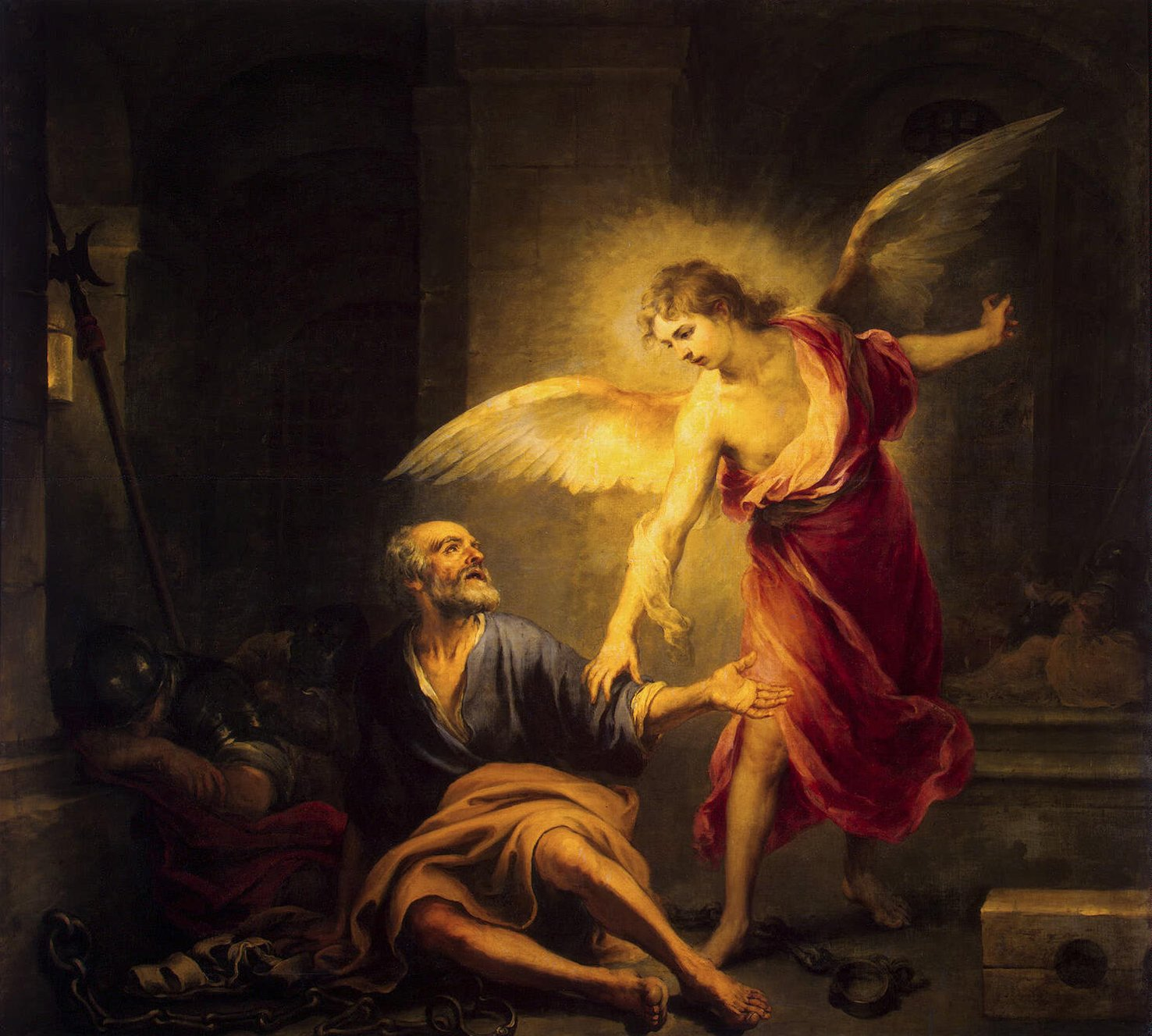
Liberation of St. Peter
(Bartolomé Esteban Murillo, 1667).

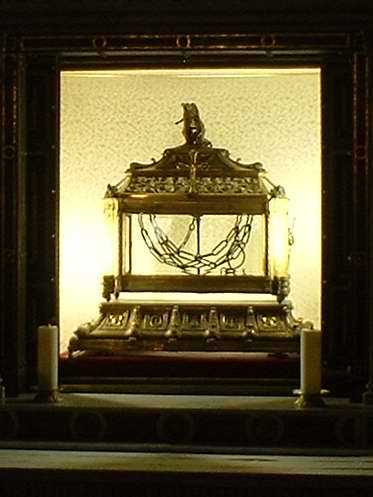
Chains of the Apostle Peter.
(Church of San Pietro in Vincoli, Rome).

Martyrs Speusippus, Eleusippus, and Melapsippus, Cappadocian triplets, and those with them.
(Menologion of Basil II, 10th century).

Martyr Danax the Reader, of Avlona, Illyria.
(Menologion of Basil II, 10th century).

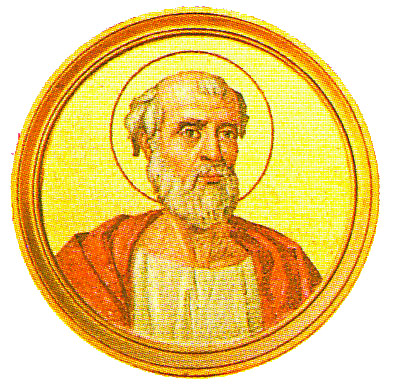
Pope Marcellus I.

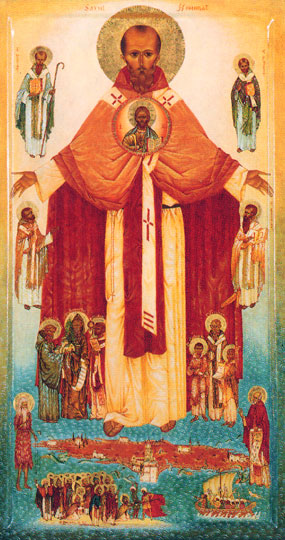
Icon of Saint Honoratus of Arles, founder of Lérins Monastery.

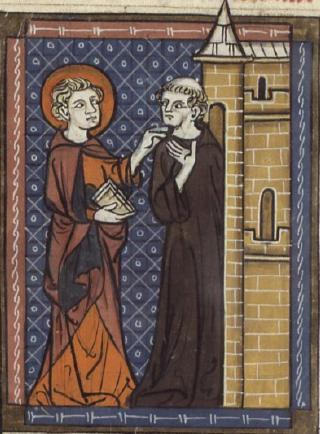
Saint Fursey and the monk.
(14th century).

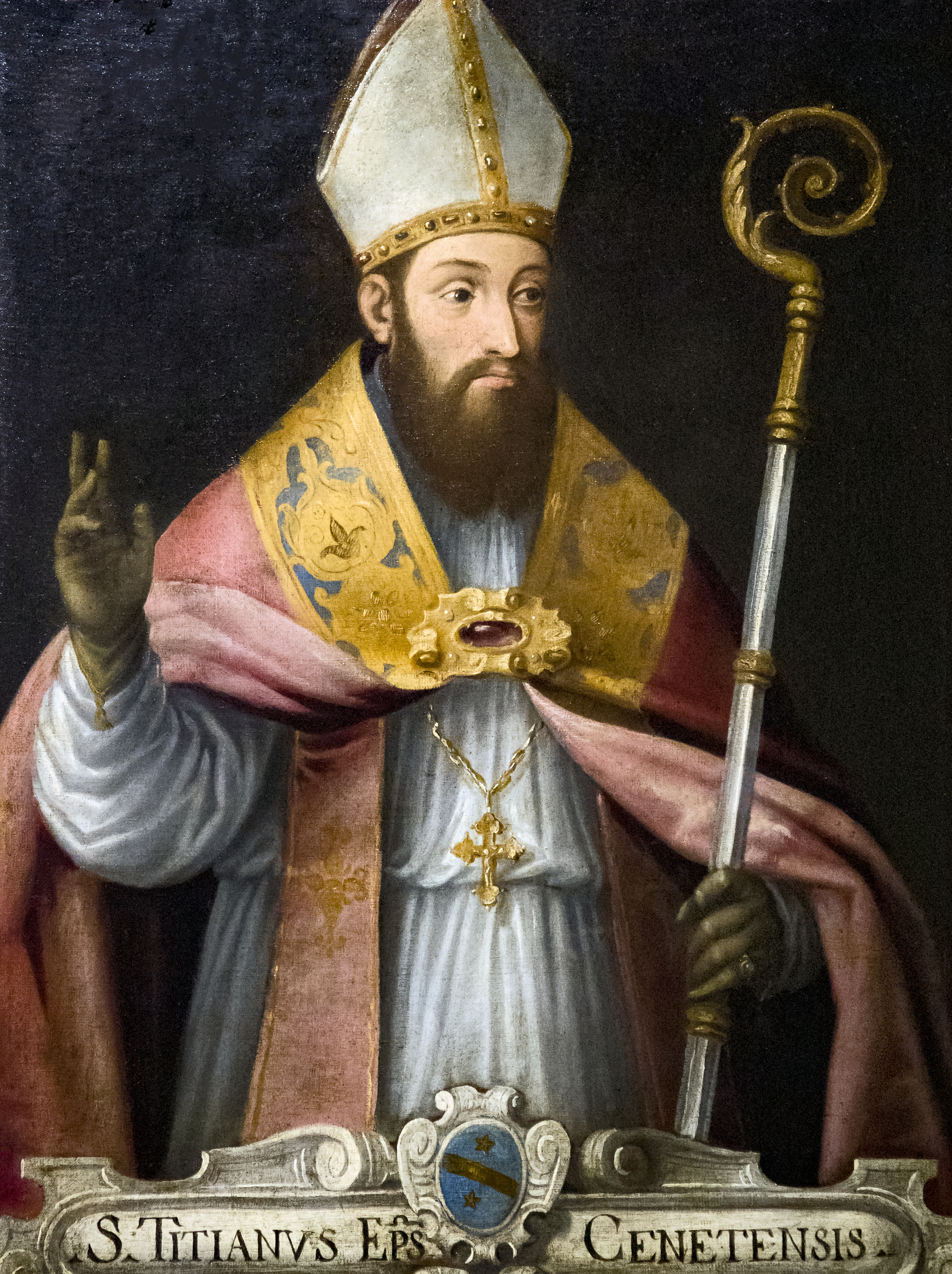
Saint Titian of Oderzo.

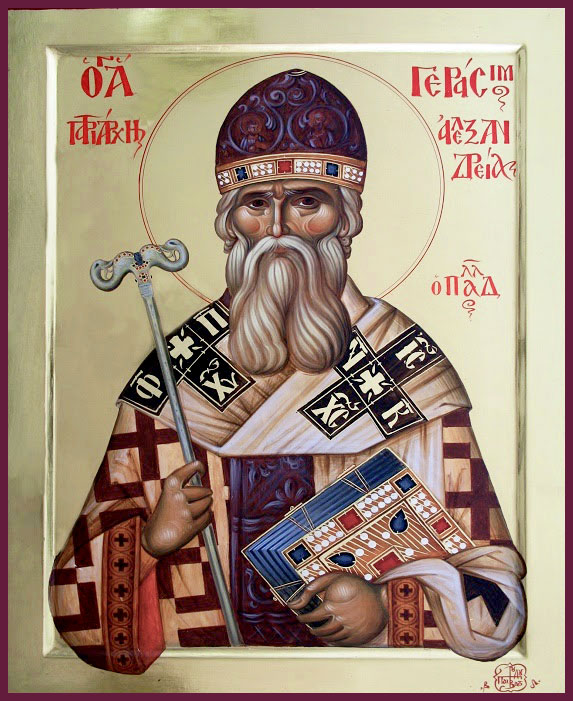
Saint Gerasimos II Palladas, Patriarch of Alexandria.

== Sources ==
- January 16/January 29. Orthodox Calendar (PRAVOSLAVIE.RU).
- January 29 / January 16. HOLY TRINITY RUSSIAN ORTHODOX CHURCH (A parish of the Patriarchate of Moscow).
- January 16. OCA - The Lives of the Saints.
- The Autonomous Orthodox Metropolia of Western Europe and the Americas (ROCOR). St. Hilarion Calendar of Saints for the year of our Lord 2004. St. Hilarion Press (Austin, TX). p. 8.
- January 16. Latin Saints of the Orthodox Patriarchate of Rome.
- The Roman Martyrology. Transl. by the Archbishop of Baltimore. Last Edition, According to the Copy Printed at Rome in 1914. Revised Edition, with the Imprimatur of His Eminence Cardinal Gibbons. Baltimore: John Murphy Company, 1916. pp. 16–17.

Greek Sources

- Great Synaxaristes: (in Greek) 16 ΙΑΝΟΥΑΡΙΟΥ. ΜΕΓΑΣ ΣΥΝΑΞΑΡΙΣΤΗΣ.
- (in Greek) Συναξαριστής. 16 Ιανουαρίου. ECCLESIA.GR. (H ΕΚΚΛΗΣΙΑ ΤΗΣ ΕΛΛΑΔΟΣ).

Russian Sources

- (in Russian) 29 января (16 января). Православная Энциклопедия под редакцией Патриарха Московского и всея Руси Кирилла (электронная версия). (Orthodox Encyclopedia - Pravenc.ru).
- (in Russian) 16 января (ст.ст.) 29 января 2014 (нов. ст.). Русская Православная Церковь Отдел внешних церковных связей. (DECR).
