= Patriarch Cosmas of Constantinople =

Patriarch Cosmas of Constantinople may refer to:

- Cosmas I of Constantinople, Ecumenical Patriarch in 1075–1081
- Cosmas II of Constantinople, Ecumenical Patriarch in 1146–1147
- Cosmas III of Constantinople, Ecumenical Patriarch in 1714–1716
