= Samuel of Alexandria =

Greek Patriarch of Alexandria from 1710 to 1712 and 1714 to 1723

Samuel served as Greek Orthodox Patriarch of Alexandria in 1710–1712 and in 1714–1723.

Pope Clement XI sent the Franciscan Lorenzo Cozza (later Cardinal) to Samuel in 1703 with the hope that the Patriarch might conclude union with Rome. He in fact signed a declaration of his renunciation of Orthodoxy, and his embrace of Catholicism ten years later was conveyed to the Pope in consistory on 28 April 1713. Samuel was immediately attacked by his former co-religionists, leading Clement XI to try to enlist the protection of European leaders for the Patriarch, including that of Louis XIV, the King of France. Documents indicate, however, that the Roman church's grip on Samuel was more tenuous than Clement XI had hoped: he was the subject of a call to fidelity to the Roman church and the Propaganda declined to send financial subventions to the Egyptian churches until the union had been completely effected.

Preceded by Gerasimus II	Greek Orthodox Patriarch of Alexandria; 1710–1712	Succeeded by Cosmas II
Preceded by Cosmas II	Greek Orthodox Patriarch of Alexandria; 1714–1723	Succeeded by Cosmas II
