= Gerasimos Palladas =

Greek Orthodox Patriarch of Alexandria between 1688 and 1710

Saint Gerasimos II
- Patriarch of Alexandria
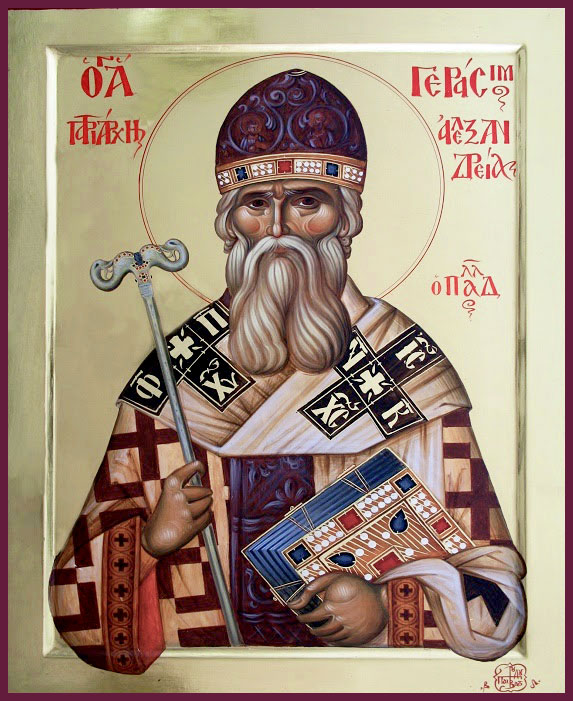
- Native name: Γεράσιμος Παλλαδάς
- Church: Greek Orthodox Patriarchate of Alexandria
- In office: 1688 – 20 Jan 1710
- Predecessor: Parthenius I
- Successor: Samuel
- Previous post: Metropolitan of Kastoria

Personal details
- Born: unknown
- Died: 15 January 1714 Vatopedi Monastery, Mount Athos, Greece
- Denomination: Greek Orthodox Patriarchate of Alexandria

Sainthood
- Feast day: 16 January
- Venerated in: Eastern Orthodox Church
- Title as Saint: Patriarch, Holy Hierarch
- Canonized: 2003; Alexandria by Greek Orthodox Patriarchate of Alexandria

Gerasimos II Palladas (Greek: Γεράσιμος Β' Παλλαδάς) served as Greek Orthodox Patriarch of Alexandria between 1688 and 1710. He is honoured as a saint of the Eastern Orthodox Church and is commemorated annually on 16 January.

== Sources ==
- "Gerasimos II Paladas (1688–1710)". Official web site of the Greek Orthodox Patriarchate of Alexandria and All Africa.
- Great Synaxaristes: (in Greek) Ὁ Ἅγιος Γεράσιμος ὁ Παλλαδὰς Πατριάρχης Ἀλεξανδρείας. 16 Ιανουαρίου. ΜΕΓΑΣ ΣΥΝΑΞΑΡΙΣΤΗΣ.

Preceded by Parthenius I	Greek Orthodox Patriarch of Alexandria; 1688–1710	Succeeded by Samuel

== story ==
Saint Gerasimos Palladas, born in 1633 in the village of Skillous in Pediados, Crete, hailed from noble and devout parents. His father, Theodoros, served as the Protopriest and Preacher in Handaka, and one of his sermons delivered in 1633 in honor of the Ten Holy Martyrs of Crete is still extant. Gerasimos received his initial education from his father and later pursued further studies in Kerkyra and Venice, becoming proficient in Greek, Latin, and Hebrew.

Upon returning to Greece, Gerasimos was unable to access Crete, which had come under Turkish rule. As a result, he engaged in teaching and preaching in various regions, including the Peloponnese, Ioannina, Arta, and Paramythia. His elevation to Metropolitan of Kastoria remains undocumented, but during this period, he became known for his wisdom and holiness as a teacher. In May 1686, he was appointed Metropolitan of Adrianople, where he gained recognition for his intellect and leadership.

On July 25, 1688, Gerasimos was elected as the Patriarch of Alexandria, succeeding Patriarch Parthenios (1678-1688), who had perished in an earthquake in Smyrna. His primary focus as Patriarch was the dissemination of the divine word, and many of his written homilies continue to survive. Facing significant debts within the Patriarchate, he traveled to Romania and Russia to raise funds, where he was received with honor and presented with generous gifts, leading to the establishment of Dependencies of the Patriarchate in those regions.
