= September 20 (Eastern Orthodox liturgics) =

Day in the Eastern Orthodox liturgical calendar

Eastern Orthodox liturgical calendar
September 19	September 20	September 21
September 20 O.S. ≍ October 3 N.S. September 20 N.S ≍ September 7 O.S.

An Eastern Orthodox cross

September 20 in Eastern Orthodox liturgical calendars is a feast day and a day of commemoration of saints and martyrs. Although some Orthodox churches use the Revised Julian Calendar and others use the traditional Julian calendar, the fixed commemorations for their respective September 20 are broadly the same, no matter which calendar is used. (Note: Despite the dates being the same, the days to which they refer typically differ by 13 days. The notation Old Style or O.S. is sometimes used to indicate a date in the traditional Julian Calendar (the "Old Calendar"). The notation New Style or N.S. indicates a date in the Revised Julian calendar (the "New Calendar").)

== Feasts ==
- Afterfeast of the Exaltation of the Cross.

== Saints ==
- Great-martyr Eustathius Placidas, his wife Martyr Theopistes, and their sons Martyrs Agapius and Theopistus, of Rome (118) (Note: Name days celebrated today include: Eustathios, Stathis (Εὐστάθιος); Eustathia (Εὐσταθία).) (Note: Eustace was an officer, Theopistes, his wife, and Agapitus and Theopistus, their two sons, were martyred in Rome under Hadrian. Eustace owed his conversion to a vision of a stag with a cross between its antlers, seen by him while hunting.) (Note: "At Rome, the holy martyrs Eustachius, and Theopistes, his wife, with their two sons, Agapitus and Theopistus. Under the emperor Adrian, they were condemned to be cast to the beasts, but through the power of God, being uninjured by them, they were shut up in a burning brazen ox, and thus terminated their martyrdom.")
- Martyrs Artemidorus and Thallos, by the sword.
- Martyr John the Confessor, of Egypt, beheaded in Palestine, and with him 40 martyrs (295 or 310)
- Saints Theodore and Euprepius, and two men named Anastasius (7th century), confessors and disciples of Saint Maximos the Confessor.
- Hieromartyrs Hypatius, Bishop of Ephesus and Andrew the Presbyter, Confessors of the Holy Icons, under Leo III the Isaurian (8th century) (see also: September 21)
- Venerable John the Godbearer, of Crete, monk (1031)
- Venerable Meletius of Cyprus, Bishop. (see also: September 21)

== Pre-Schism Western saints ==
- Saint Candida, a virgin-martyr in Carthage in North Africa under Maximian Herculeus (c. 300) (Note: "At Carthage, St. Candida, virgin and martyr; who, having all her body lacerated with whips, was crowned with martyrdom, under the emperor Maximian.")
- Saint Glycerius, Archbishop of Milan, Confessor (438) (Note: "At Milan, St. Clicerius, bishop and confessor.")
- Saint Agapitus I, Pope of Rome (536) (Note: Born in Rome, he was elected Pope of Rome in May 535 and reposed in Constantinople on April 22 536. As Pope he showed great strength of character in opposing Monophysitism. His relics were brought back to Rome on Sept 20, when he was commemorated a second time.) (Note: "The same day, pope St. Agapitus, whose sanctity is attested by blessed Gregory the Great.") (see also: April 17 - East)
- Saint Vincent Madelgarius, Benedictine monk (677) (Note: Madelgarus was the husband of St Waldetrudis. They had four children, all saints: Landericus, Dentin, Madalberta and Aldegtrudis. About the year 653 she became a nun and Madelgarus became a monk with the name of Vincent in Haumont in Belgium which he had founded. Later he founded another monastery in Soignies, also in Belgium.)
- Saint Eusebia of Saint-Cyr, Benedictine Abbess of a convent in Marseilles in France, martyred with some forty nuns by the Saracens at Saint-Cyr (c. 731) (Note: Her tomb is to be found in the Abbey of St. Victor, Marseille.)

== Post-Schism Orthodox saints ==
- Saint Eustathius of Thessalonica, Archbishop of Thessalonica (1197)
- Holy Martyrs Blessed Prince Michael of Chernigov, and his counsellor Theodore of Chernigov, Wonderworkers (1245)
- Saint Oleg Romanovich, Prince of Bryansk (1285) (Note: See: (in Russian) Олег Романович. Википедии. (Russian Wikipedia).)
- Right-believing Prince John of Putyvl, Ukraine (14th century)
- New Monk-martyr Hilarion the Cretan, of St. Anne’s Skete, Mt. Athos, at Constantinople (1804)

=== New martyrs and confessors ===
- New Hieromartyr Anatole (Kamensky), Archbishop of Irkutsk (1925) (Note: See: (in Russian) Анатолий (Каменский). Википедии. (Russian Wikipedia).)
- New Hieromartyrs Theoctistus Smelnitsky (Note: See: (in Russian) Смельницкий, Феоктист Елисеевич. Википедии. (Russian Wikipedia).) and Alexander Tetiuyev, Priests (1937)

== Other commemorations ==
- Synaxis of the icon of Panagia Voulkaniotissa, in Messinia (1755)
- Synaxis of the Saints of Bryansk. (Note: See: (in Russian) Собор Брянских святых. Википедии. (Russian Wikipedia).)

== Icon gallery ==
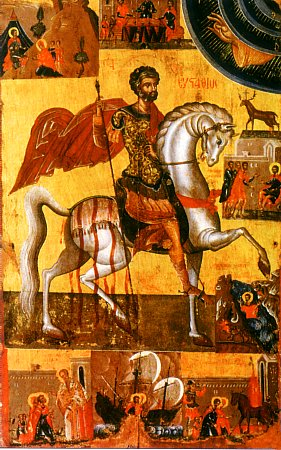
St. Eustathios Placidas.

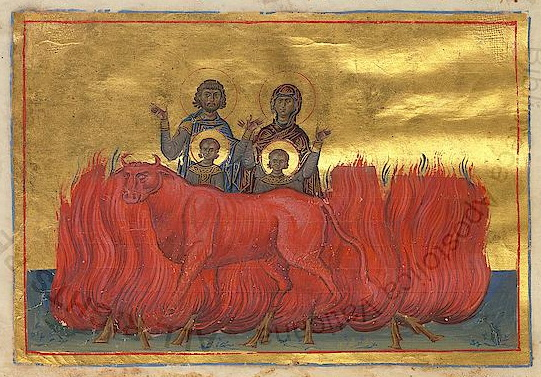
Martyrdom of St. Eustathios Placidas and family.
(Menologion of Basil II, 10th century).

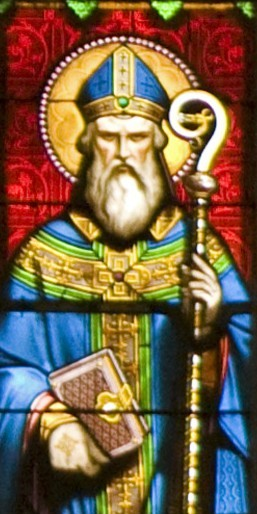
St. Agapitus I, Pope of Rome.

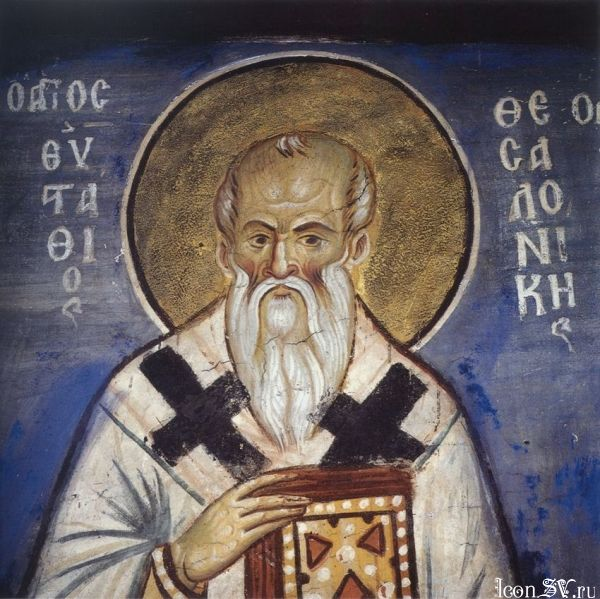
Eustathios of Thessaloniki, Archbishop (c.1175 - c.1195/6).

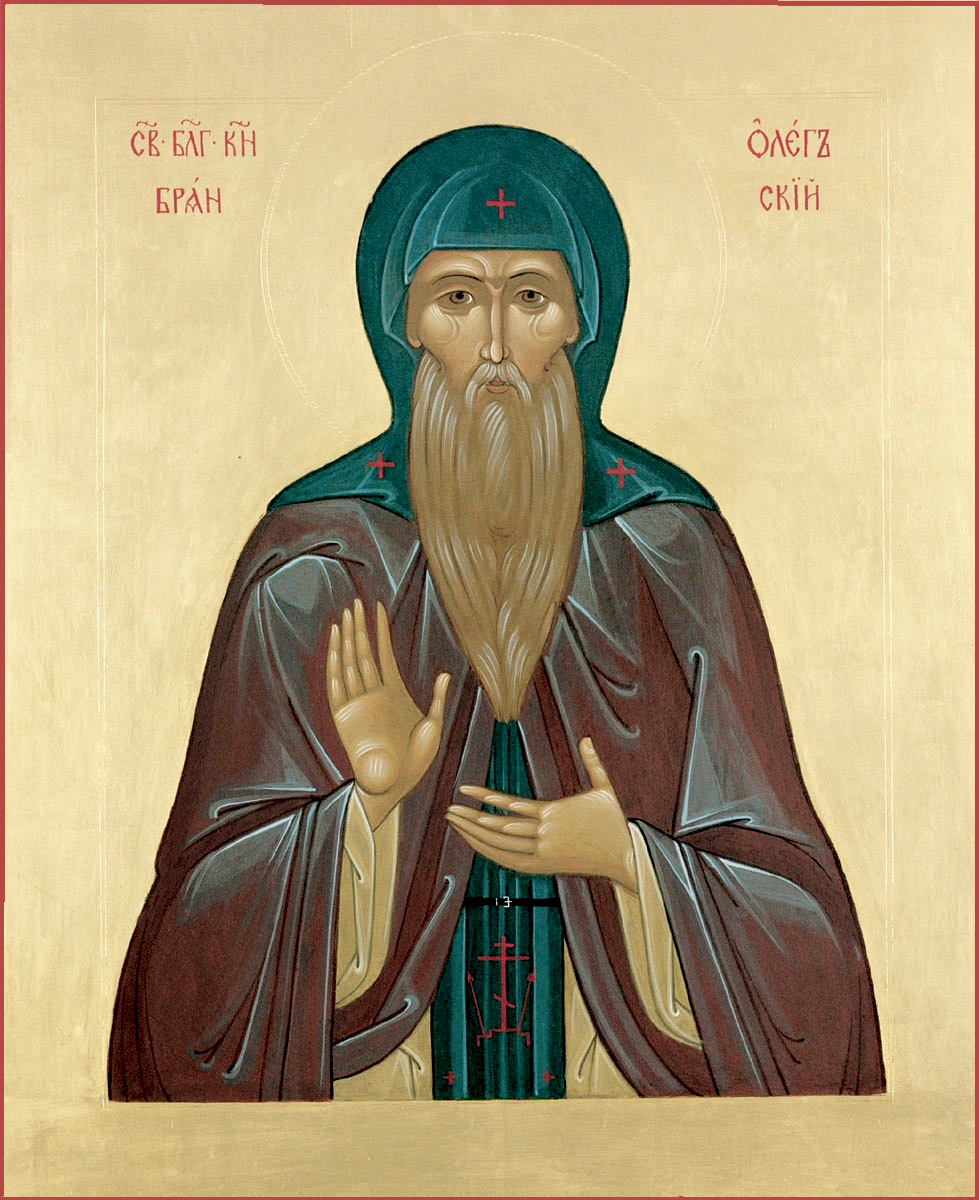
Saint Oleg Romanovich, Prince of Bryansk (1285).

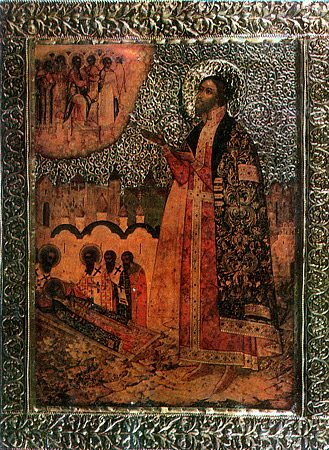
Holy Martyr Blessed Prince Michael of Chernigov.

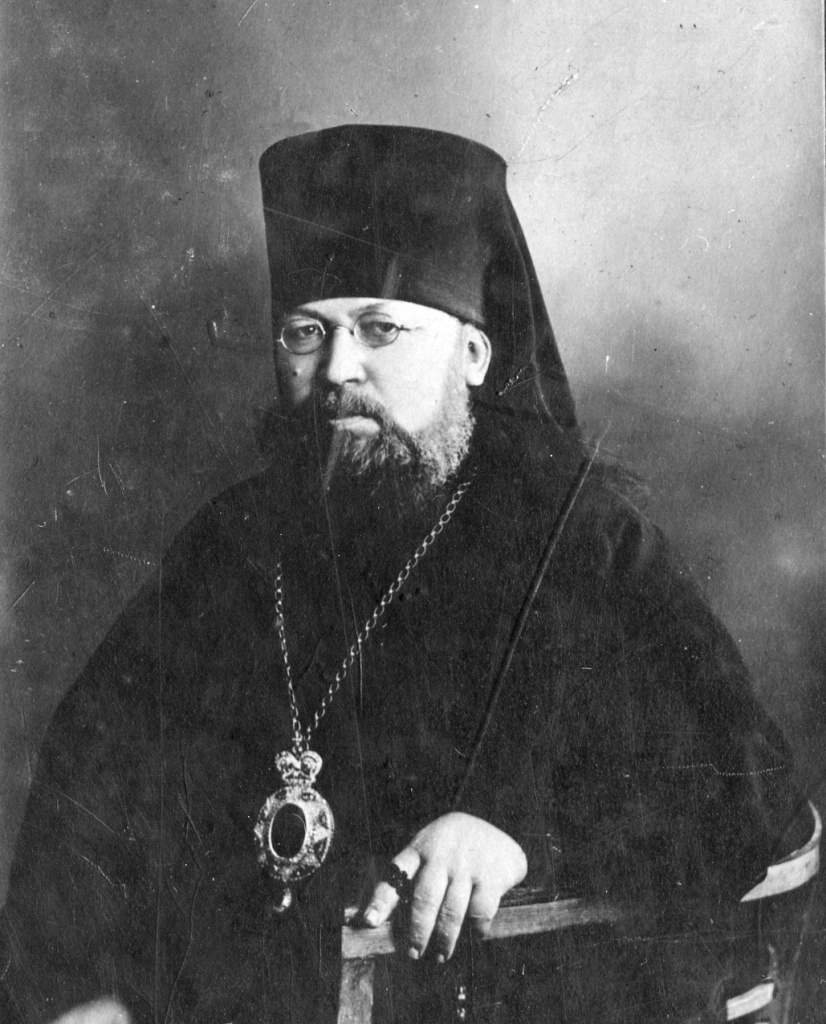
New Hieromartyr Anatole (Kamensky).

== Sources ==
- September 20/October 3. Orthodox Calendar (PRAVOSLAVIE.RU).
- October 3 / September 20. HOLY TRINITY RUSSIAN ORTHODOX CHURCH (A parish of the Patriarchate of Moscow).
- September 20. OCA - The Lives of the Saints.
- The Autonomous Orthodox Metropolia of Western Europe and the Americas (ROCOR). St. Hilarion Calendar of Saints for the year of our Lord 2004. St. Hilarion Press (Austin, TX). p. 70.
- The Twentieth Day of the Month of September. Orthodoxy in China.
- September 20. Latin Saints of the Orthodox Patriarchate of Rome.
- The Roman Martyrology. Transl. by the Archbishop of Baltimore. Last Edition, According to the Copy Printed at Rome in 1914. Revised Edition, with the Imprimatur of His Eminence Cardinal Gibbons. Baltimore: John Murphy Company, 1916. pp. 290–291.
- Rev. Richard Stanton. A Menology of England and Wales, or, Brief Memorials of the Ancient British and English Saints Arranged According to the Calendar, Together with the Martyrs of the 16th and 17th Centuries. London: Burns & Oates, 1892. p. 454.

Greek Sources

- Great Synaxaristes: (in Greek) 20 ΣΕΠΤΕΜΒΡΙΟΥ. ΜΕΓΑΣ ΣΥΝΑΞΑΡΙΣΤΗΣ.
- (in Greek) Συναξαριστής. 20 Σεπτεμβρίου. ECCLESIA.GR. (H ΕΚΚΛΗΣΙΑ ΤΗΣ ΕΛΛΑΔΟΣ).
- (in Greek) 20/09/2016. Ορθόδοξος Συναξαριστής.

Russian Sources

- (in Russian) 3 октября (20 сентября). Православная Энциклопедия под редакцией Патриарха Московского и всея Руси Кирилла (электронная версия). (Orthodox Encyclopedia - Pravenc.ru).
- (in Russian) 20 сентября по старому стилю / 3 октября по новому стилю. Русская Православная Церковь - Православный церковный календарь на 2016 год.
