= Arseny of Winnipeg =

Russian Orthodox bishop in Canada (1866–1945)

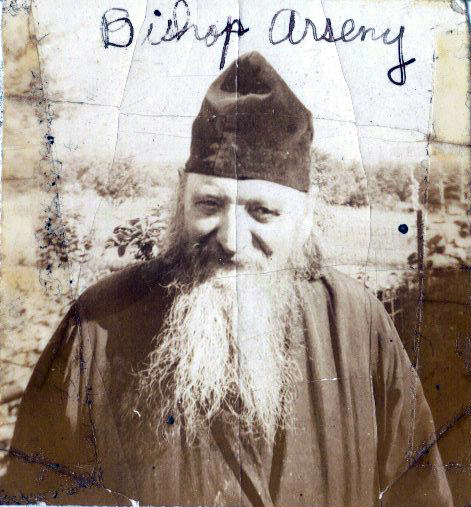

Arseny of Winnipeg, known to be the most reverend archbishop (secular name Andrew Lvovich Chagovtsov, Russian: Андрей Львович Чаговцов; 10 March 1866 – 4 October 1945) and as the "Canadian Chrysostom" was a bishop of the Russian Orthodox Greek Catholic Church in America.

He came to the United States as a monk in the early twentieth century and was instrumental in the founding of St Tikhon's Monastery in South Canaan, Pennsylvania. He was administrator of the Canadian parishes under Abp. Platon (Rozhdestvensky) before returning in 1910 to Russia where he stayed until after the Russian Civil War. In 1926, he was elected Bishop of Winnipeg. He retired to St. Tikhon's Monastery where he established the Pastoral School.

== Life ==
Andrew Lvovich Chagovstov was born on March 10, 1866, into the family of a village church reader in the Kharkov Eparchy. As a young boy he tended his father's sheep, but his intelligence and love for school did not go unnoticed. When his father died, leaving him as the eldest of five children, he was sent to a school for clergy children for eleven years. From there he was admitted to the Kharkov Theological Seminary from which he graduated with distinction in 1887. The same year he was ordained a deacon and then priest.

His years in the seminary and thereafter are only vaguely known. He apparently married while in the seminary and was assigned as a priest to a village church in Kharkov. There is a question as to whether he had a son, but soon his wife died, probably about 1890, of an unknown cause. At some point later he was tonsured a monk with the name Arseny, in honor of St. Arsenius of Konevits. But, his journey from his wife's death to his tonsure was a time of great anguish as he related in his elevation speech as Bishop of Winnipeg. In 1900, he was appointed Igumen (Abbot) of Kuriansk Monastery. Two years later he joined Bp. Tikhon in America as he was a natural preacher with fluency in many Russian dialects, and thus, well suited to the American missionary scene. He was active among those returning from the Unia and served many communities after his arrival, including Troy, New York, and Mayfield and Simpson, Pennsylvania.

While he was active among the people, a dream of his came true when with the blessing of the then Abp. Tikhon, Hieromonk Arseny founded the St. Tikhon's Monastery and orphanage in the rural countryside near Carbondale and Mayfield, Pennsylvania at South Canaan. The Wagner farm was purchased for $2,580 during the summer of 1905. On the day of its dedication, July 31, 1905, a crowd on foot formed a pilgrimage walk of the ten miles through the mountains from Mayfield to the site of the new monastery. On the following May 30, 1906, at the dedication of the chapel at the partially finished monastery building with Abp. Tikhon present, Bp. Raphael spoke of the hard work by Fr. Igumen Arseny for the realization of the monastery. When Fr. Arseny was named the superior of the monastery, the crowd answered loudly, "He is worthy." The anniversary of this dedication has become an annual Memorial Day pilgrimage to the monastery.

Then, in 1908, Fr. Arseny was appointed by then Abp. Platon to the position of dean and administrator of the Canadian parishes. With his knowledge of the many dialects of the Carpatho-Russian/Galician area and his ability to preach in them, the Canadian faithful (who mainly hailed from those areas) had a positive view of him. He was fairly successful with receiving back Uniats as well as welcoming many Galicians and Bukovinians who were arriving in Canada. He was given the affectionate title "The Canadian Chrysostom." After only two years, however, he returned to Russia in 1910.

Little is known for certain of why he returned to Russia or his activities while there. In his request to the Synod, he wrote:

In January of this year, I completed seven years of service in the American Orthodox Mission. I worked, by the mercy of God, as I could, attempting not to be lazy, to carry on the high calling of a missionary, to make a steady effort, not operating solely from rationality/intellect. In the last two years of my service, heavy afflictions and laborious work in the Canadian wilds had taken their toll on my health, and material lack have repeatedly brought my spirit to full despondency. In the last while I have been fully invalided with a terrible hernia, which from the constant journeying creates horrible pain; doctors are trying to force me towards a surgery, but I am afraid to lie beneath a knife, lest I die in this foreign land.

Upon his return to Russia, there are some reports are that he was involved in the training of missionary-priests and that he headed a monastery in the Crimea. After the October Revolution, he served with the White Army to comfort the soldiers. In 1920, he was able to get to Yugoslavia and entered a monastery. Some of his old Canadian flock learned that he was still alive and petitioned Metropolitan Platon to return him to Canada as a bishop.

Thus, the holy synod under Platon elected him Bishop of Winnipeg and requested his consecration, which took place on June 6, 1926, in Yugoslavia. Bishop Arseny traveled to New York to meet with the metropolitan, visit his beloved St Tikhon's Monastery, and then continue on to his new cathedral. It was, however, a different place from that which he left sixteen years before. The seeds of violence from the Red Revolution, Ukrainian nationalism, and the Living Church made his task difficult, even to the point of being injured by gun fire. In 1936, he was assigned briefly to Detroit and Cleveland before retiring to St Tikhon's Monastery where he was appointed archbishop.

Yet, in retirement he did not cease his service. In 1937, he applied to the holy synod of the Metropolia for blessing to establish a Pastoral School at the monastery in South Canaan. With the blessing of the synod, the approval of the Sixth All-American Sobor, and great effort on his part, Abp. Arseny opened on October 24, 1938, the first classes of the St Tikhon's Pastoral School, later to become St. Tikhon's Orthodox Theological Seminary.

He continued actively visiting the local parishes and traveling for special occasions. Then at the age of 79, illness overcame him and Abp. Arseny died on October 4, 1945, in Scranton, Pennsylvania. His funeral and interment at St. Tikhon's Monastery took place on October 9, 1945, attended by many hierarchs, priests, and faithful.

== Glorification inquiry ==
During its October 2004 holy synod meeting, bishops of the OCA established a glorification commission to inquire into the possibility for adding Abp. Arseny to the calendar of saints. Abp. Arseny already enjoys veneration from some in the OCA's Archdiocese of Canada.

== Sources ==
- Orthodox America 1794-1976 Development of the Orthodox Church in America, C. J. Tarasar, Gen. Ed. 1975, The Orthodox Church in America, Syosett, New York
