= Gerulfus =

Roman Catholic Saint

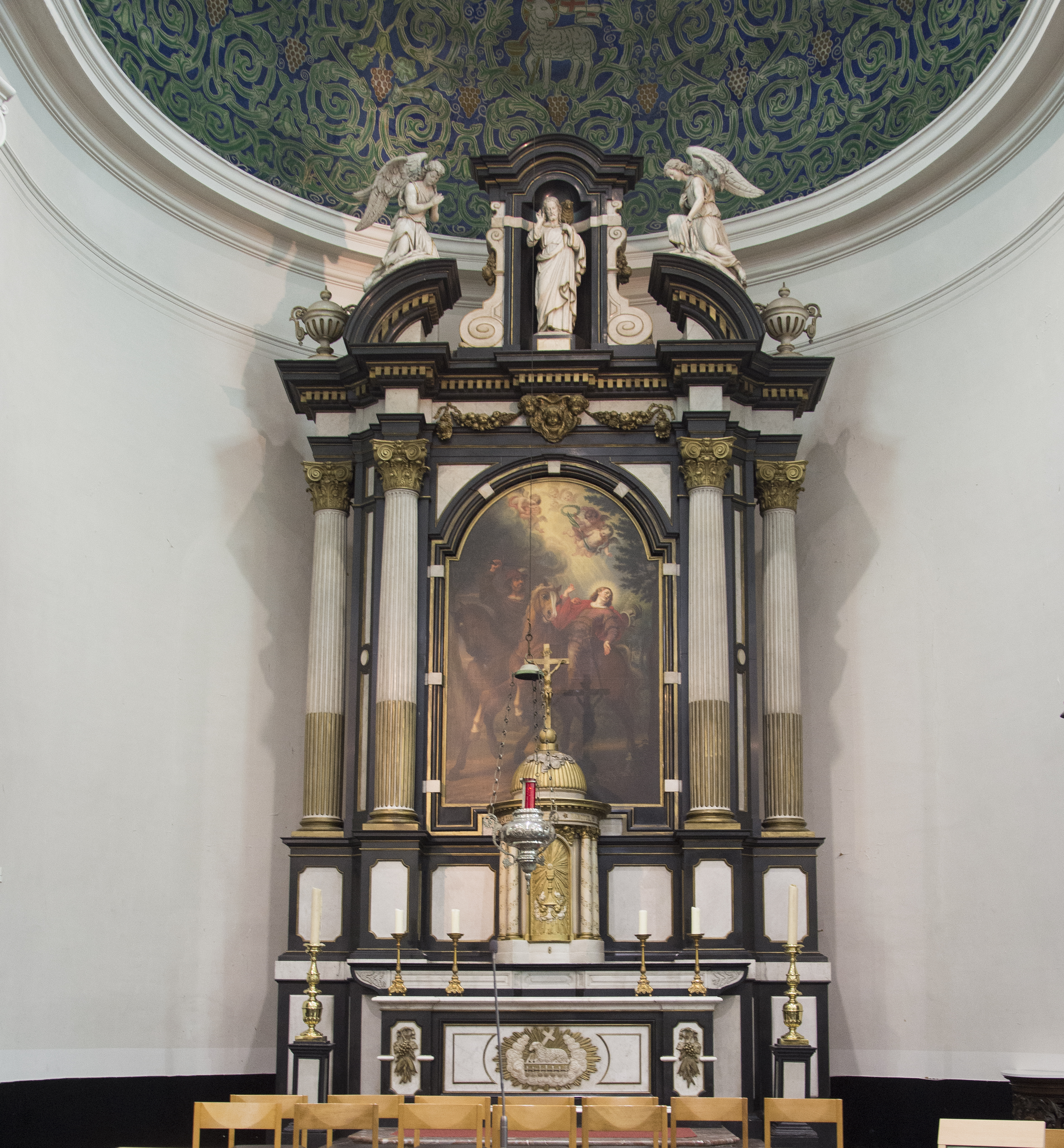

Gerulfus (also known as Gerolf; Merendree 740–748) is a Roman Catholic Saint of Flanders. His relics are kept in Drongen, after they were removed from his grave in Merendree around 915 or 930. He is the patron saint of young people.
