= September 22 (Eastern Orthodox liturgics) =

Day in the Eastern Orthodox liturgical calendar

Eastern Orthodox liturgical calendar
| September 21 | September 22 | September 23 |
September 22 O.S. ≍ October 5 N.S. September 22 N.S ≍ September 9 O.S.

An Eastern Orthodox cross

September 22 in Eastern Orthodox liturgical calendars is a feast day and a day of commemoration of saints and martyrs. Although some Orthodox churches use the Revised Julian Calendar and others use the traditional Julian calendar, the fixed commemorations for their respective September 22 are broadly the same, no matter which calendar is used. (Note: Despite the dates being the same, the days to which they refer typically differ by 13 days. The notation Old Style or O.S. is sometimes used to indicate a date in the traditional Julian Calendar (the "Old Calendar"). The notation New Style or N.S. indicates a date in the Revised Julian calendar (the "New Calendar").)

== Saints ==
- Prophet Jonah (8th century B.C.) (see also: September 21)
- Hieromartyr Phocas, Bishop of Sinope, Wonderworker (117) (Note: Name days celebrated today include: Phocas (Φωκᾶς).)
- Martyr Phocas the Gardener, of Sinope (320)
- Martyrs Isaac and Martin, by the sword. (Note: Some Synaxaria add the name of a certain Saint Nicholas together with martyrs Isaac and Martin.)
- Saint Peter of Constantinople, tax collector in Africa (6th century)
- Venerable Jonah the Sabbaite, the Presbyter (9th century), father of Sts. Theophanes the Hymnographer and Theodore Graptus. (see also: September 21 )

== Pre-Schism Western saints ==
- Saints Digna and Emerita, Virgin-martyrs in Rome under Valerian (c. 259) (Note: They died while standing before their judges in prayer. Their relics are enshrined in the church of St Marcellus in Rome.) (Note: "At Rome, the martyrdom of the holy virgins and martyrs Digna and Emerita, under Valerian and Gallienus. Their relics are kept in the church of St. Marcellus.")
- Martyrs Maurice and the Theban Legion, including the officers Candidus and Exuperius, at Agaunum, Gaul (c. 287) (Note: "At St. Maurice, near Sion, in Switzerland, the birthday of the holy Theban martyrs Maurice, Exuperius, Candidus, Victor, Innocent, and Vitalis, with their companions of the same legion, whose martyrdom for the faith, in the time of Maximian, filled the world with the glory of their sufferings.") (Note: The army of Maximinian Herculeus included a legion (6,600 men) of Christians recruited in Upper Egypt. When the Emperor marched his army across the Alps to suppress a revolt in Gaul, he camped near Agaunum in Switzerland and prepared for battle with public sacrifices. The Christian legion refused to take part and were as a result consequence decimated twice. When they still persevered in their refusal they were massacred. Among those who suffered were Maurice, Exuperius, Candidus, Vitalis, two Victors, Alexander (in Bergamo) and Gereon (in Cologne). A basilica was built in Agaunum, now St-Maurice-en-Valais to enshrine the relics of the martyrs.)
- Saint Jonas (Yon), a companion or disciple of St Dionysius of Paris in France, he was martyred there (3rd century) (Note: "At Arpajon, near Paris, St. Jonas, priest and martyr, who went to France with St. Denis, and after being scourged by order of the prefect Julian, ended his martyrdom by the sword.")
- Saint Sanctinus, by tradition the first Bishop of Meaux and a disciple of St Denis of Paris (c. 300) (Note: "At Meaux, blessed Sanctinus, bishop, disciple of St. Denis, the Areopagite, who, being consecrated by him bishop of that city, was the first to preach the Gospel there.")
- Saint Florentius, founder of the monastery of Saint-Florent-le-Vieux (5th century) (Note: Born in Bavaria in Germany, he was a disciple of St Martin of Tours, by whom he was ordained priest and sent to preach in Poitou in France. He eventually went to live as a hermit at Mt Glonne in Anjou, where he gained numerous disciples. He built a monastery for them later known as Saint-Florent-le-Vieux. He reposed there in extreme old age.)
- Saint Felix III, Pope of Rome (530) (Note: As Pope of Rome he is remembered for building the church of Sts Cosmas and Damian. He was greatly loved in Rome for his simplicity and generosity to the poor.)
- Saint Laud of Coutances (Lauto, Laudus, Lô), Bishop of Coutances in France for forty years (528-568)
- Hieromartyr Emmeram of Regensburg (Emmeramus, Haimhramm), Bishop in Gaul, at Regensburg, Bavaria (652) (Note: "At Ratisbon, in Bavaria, St. Emmeramus, bishop and martyr, who, to deliver others, endured patiently a most cruel death for the sake of our Lord.") (Note: Born in Poitiers in France, he moved to Bavaria in Germany where he became abbot of a monastery in Regensburg and then bishop there. He was later attacked by assassins and died from his wounds. His relics were enshrined in the monastery dedicated to him in Regensburg where he was venerated as a martyr.)
- Saint Sadalberga, foundress of the convent of St. John the Baptist at Laon (c. 665) (Note: As a child she was healed of blindness by St Eustace of Lisieux in France. She married very young but her husband died after only two months. Her second husband was St Blandinus and she had five children, two of whom are venerated as saints. In later years husband and wife took up the monastic life, Salaberga in Poulangey. Later she founded the convent of St John the Baptist in Laon where she reposed.)
- Saint Silvanus, a saint venerated from ancient times in Levroux near Bourges in France.

== Post-Schism Orthodox saints ==
- Venerable 26 Martyrs of Zographou Monastery, Mount Athos, martyred by the Latins (1284) (Note: (in Greek) "Τὰ ὀνόματά τους εἶναι: Θωμὰς ἡγούμενος, Βαρσανούφιος, Κύριλλος, Μιχαῖος (ἢ Μιχαίας), Σίμων, Ἰλαρίων, Ἰάκωβος, ἕτερος Ἰάκωβος, Ἰώβ, Κυπριανός, Σάββας, Μαρτινιανός, Κοσμᾶς, Σέργιος, Μηνᾶς, Ἰωάσαφ, Ἰωαννίκιος, Παῦλος, Ἀντώνιος, Εὐθύμιος, Δομέτιος, Παρθένιος καὶ τέσσερα ἀκόμα ἄτομα ποὺ τὰ ὀνόματά τους εἶναι ἄγνωστα".) (see also: October 10 )
- Venerable Cosmas, Desert-dweller of Zographou, Mt. Athos (1323)
- Saint Jonah, founder of the Yashezersk Annunciation Monastery, Karelia (1589-1592)
- Saint Macarius, founder of Zhabyn Monastery, Belev (1623)
- Hieromartyr Theodosius of Brazi Monastery, Metropolitan of Moldavia (1694)
- Blessed Parasceva ("Pasha of Sarov"), Fool-for-Christ, of Diveyevo Monastery (1915) (Note: Blessed Schema-Nun Paraskeva reposed at the age of 120 years.)

=== New martyrs and confessors ===
- New Hieromartyr Benjamin (Voskresensky), Bishop of Romanov (1932) (Note: See: (in Russian) Вениамин (Воскресенский). Википедии. (Russian Wikipedia).)

== Other commemorations ==
- Icon of the Most Holy Theotokos "She Who Is Quick to Hear" (14th century)
- Synaxis of the Saints of Tula. (Note: See: (in Russian) Собор Тульских святых. Википедии. (Russian Wikipedia).)
- Repose of Abbot Innocent of Valaam Monastery (1828)

== Icon gallery ==
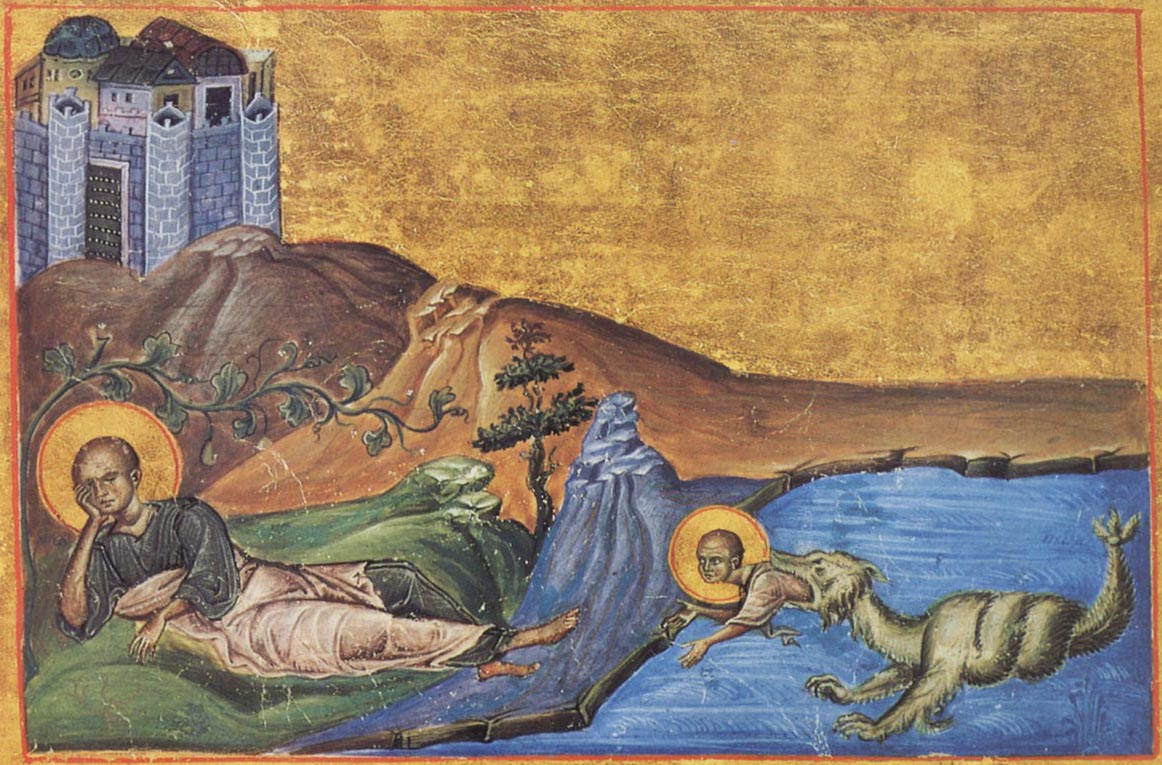
Prophet Jonah.
(Menologion of Basil II, 10th century).

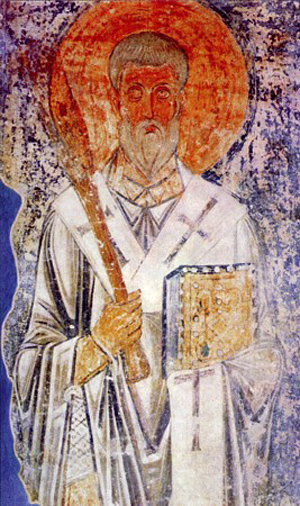
Hieromartyr Phocas, Bishop of Sinope, Wonderworker.

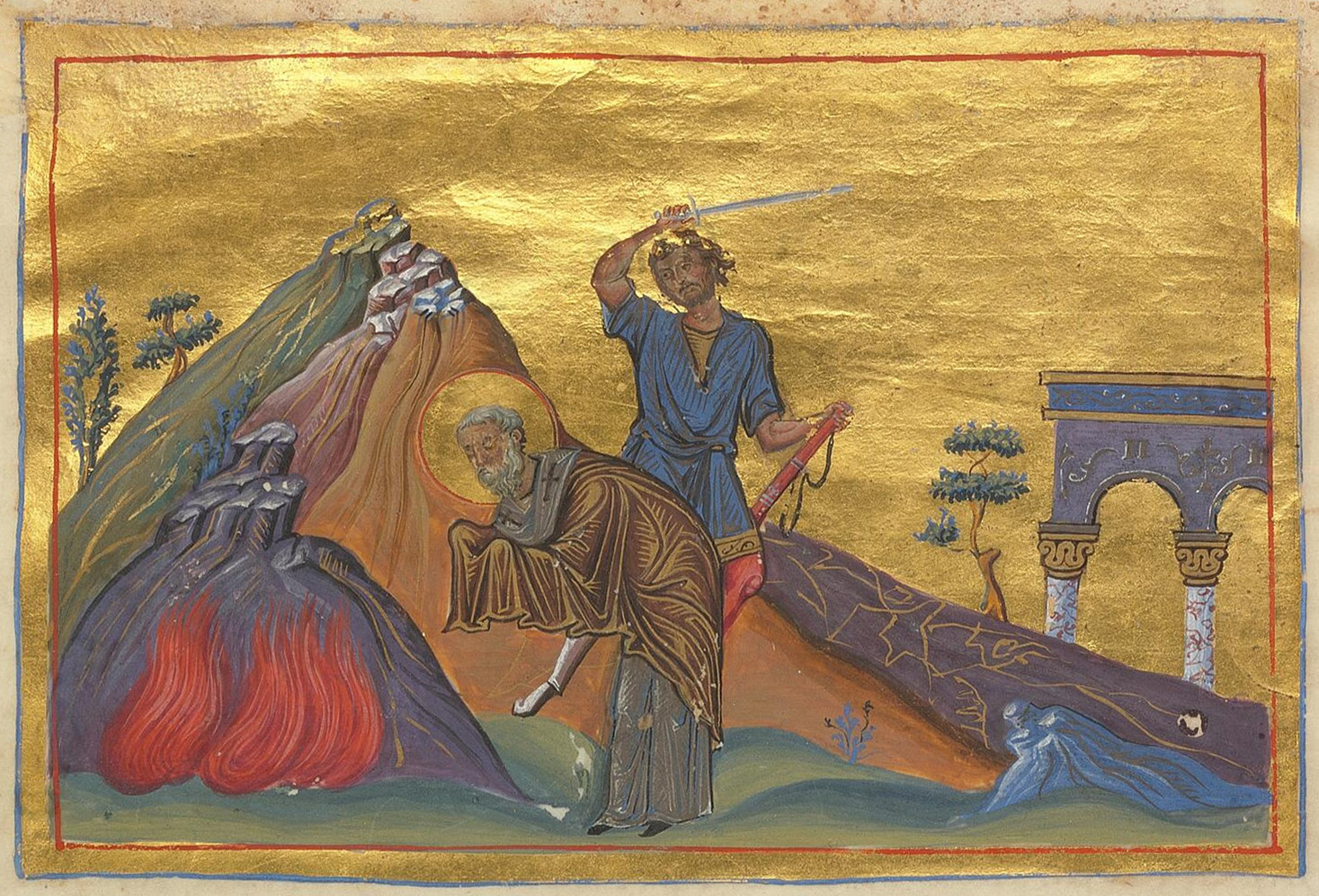
Martyr Phocas the Gardener, of Sinope.
(Menologion of Basil II, 10th century).

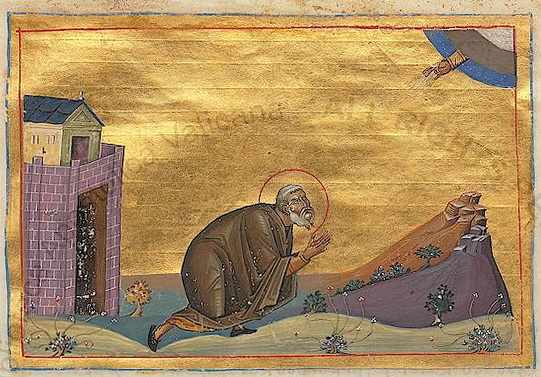
Venerable Jonah the Sabbaite, the Presbyter.
(Menologion of Basil II, 10th century).

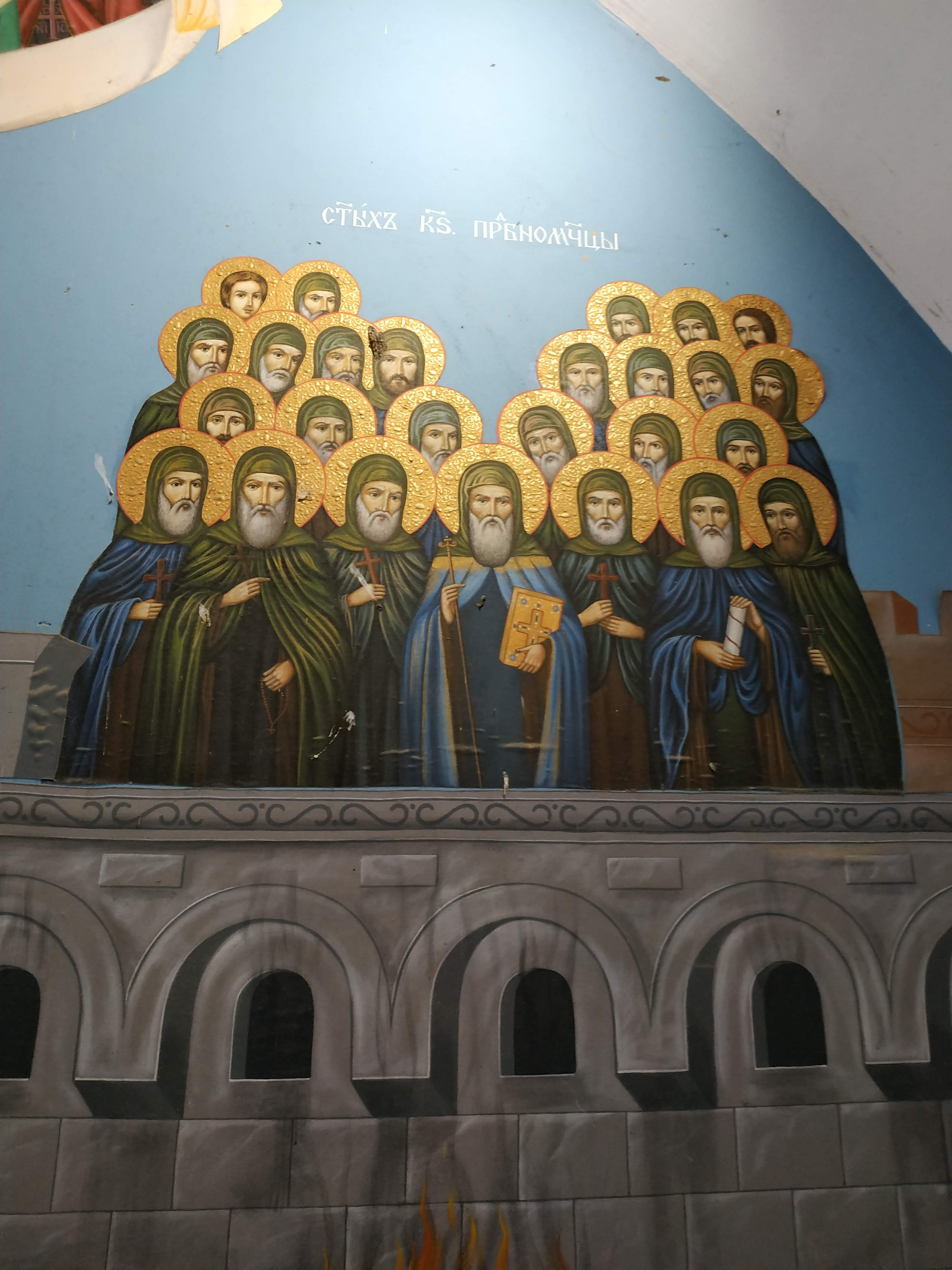
Venerable 26 Martyrs of Zographou Monastery, Mount Athos.

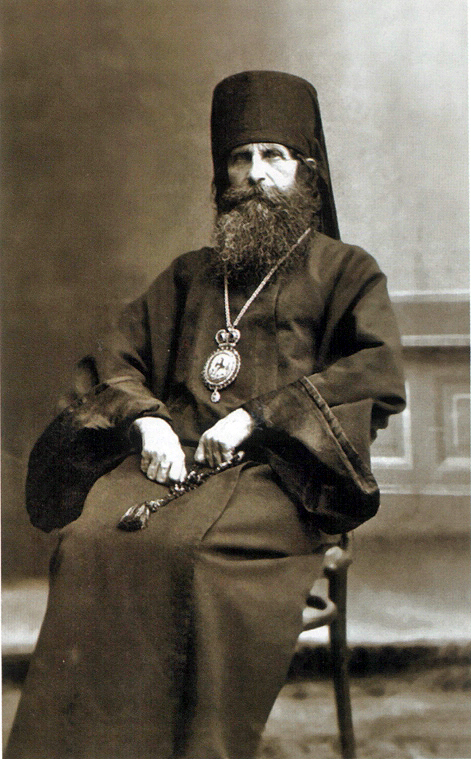
New Hieromartyr Benjamin (Voskresensky), Bishop of Romanov.

== Sources ==
- September 22/October 5. Orthodox Calendar (PRAVOSLAVIE.RU).
- October 5 / September 22. HOLY TRINITY RUSSIAN ORTHODOX CHURCH (A parish of the Patriarchate of Moscow).
- September 22. OCA - The Lives of the Saints.
- The Autonomous Orthodox Metropolia of Western Europe and the Americas (ROCOR). St. Hilarion Calendar of Saints for the year of our Lord 2004. St. Hilarion Press (Austin, TX). p. 71.
- The Twenty-Second Day of the Month of September. Orthodoxy in China.
- September 22. Latin Saints of the Orthodox Patriarchate of Rome.
- The Roman Martyrology. Transl. by the Archbishop of Baltimore. Last Edition, According to the Copy Printed at Rome in 1914. Revised Edition, with the Imprimatur of His Eminence Cardinal Gibbons. Baltimore: John Murphy Company, 1916. pp. 292–293.
- Rev. Richard Stanton. A Menology of England and Wales, or, Brief Memorials of the Ancient British and English Saints Arranged According to the Calendar, Together with the Martyrs of the 16th and 17th Centuries. London: Burns & Oates, 1892. p. 455.

Greek Sources

- Great Synaxaristes: (in Greek) 22 ΣΕΠΤΕΜΒΡΙΟΥ. ΜΕΓΑΣ ΣΥΝΑΞΑΡΙΣΤΗΣ.
- (in Greek) Συναξαριστής. 22 Σεπτεμβρίου. ECCLESIA.GR. (H ΕΚΚΛΗΣΙΑ ΤΗΣ ΕΛΛΑΔΟΣ).
- (in Greek) 22/09/2016. Ορθόδοξος Συναξαριστής.

Russian Sources

- (in Russian) 5 октября (22 сентября). Православная Энциклопедия под редакцией Патриарха Московского и всея Руси Кирилла (электронная версия). (Orthodox Encyclopedia - Pravenc.ru).
- (in Russian) 22 сентября по старому стилю / 5 октября по новому стилю. Русская Православная Церковь - Православный церковный календарь на 2016 год.
