= Phocas, Bishop of Sinope =

Bishop of Sinope (died 102)

Saint Phocas
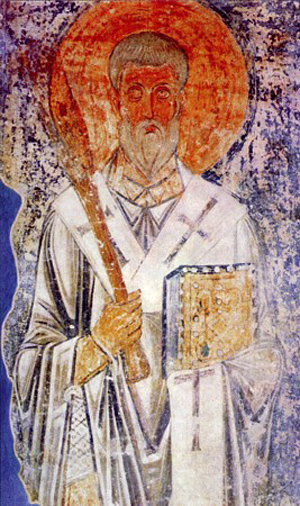
- Saint Phocas of Sinope, traditionally shown with a book and a paddle.

Martyr and Bishop of Sinope
- Died: 102; Sinope, Bithynia and Pontus, Roman Empire (modern-day Sinop, Turkey)
- Venerated in: Roman Catholic Church, Eastern Orthodox Church, Armenian Apostolic Church
- Feast: 22 September; Monday after the fourth Sunday of the Exaltation of the Cross (Armenian Apostolic Church)
- Patronage: Against fires, and help of those drowning.

Hieromartyr Phocas (Greek: Φωκάς) was born in the city of Sinope in northern Anatolia. His life and legend may have been a fusion of three men with the same name: a Phocas of Antioch, Phocas, Bishop of Sinope, and Phocas the Gardener. Only the last seems authentic.

His parents, Pamphilus and Maria, were pious Christians. During his adult years he became Bishop of Sinope. At the time of persecution against Christians under the emperor Trajan (98–117), the governor demanded that the saint renounce Christ. After fierce torture they enclosed St Phocas in a hot bath, where he died a martyr's death in the year 117.

A homily in his honour was composed by Saint John Chrysostom on the occasion of the translation of his relics to Constantinople. The translation of his holy relics from Pontus to Constantinople about the year 404 A.D. is celebrated on July 23. His primary feast is on September 22, and he is called a wonderworker.

The Hieromartyr Phocas is especially venerated as a defender against fires, and also as a helper of the drowning.
