= Saint Phocas =

Catholic and Eastern Orthodox Church saint

Saint Phocas the Gardener
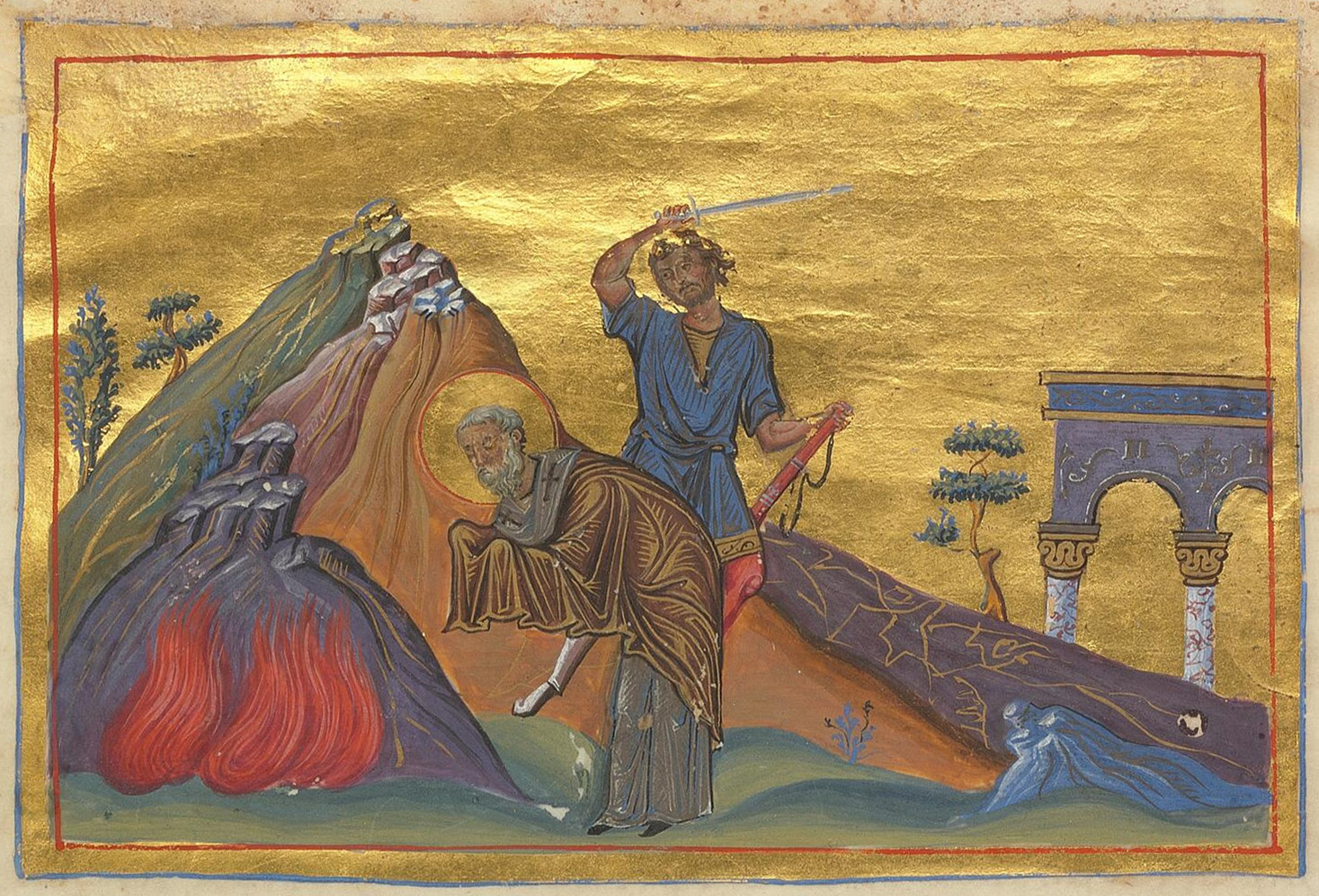
- The execution of Phocas, illustrated in the 11th century Menologion of Basil II
- Died: ~303 AD?
- Venerated in: Roman Catholic Church and Eastern Orthodox Church
- Major shrine: Relics were claimed by Vienne and Antioch
- Feast: March 5, July 3, September 22
- Attributes: Gospel book, paddle or scythe
- Patronage: gardeners; market-gardeners; hospitality; agricultural workers; farmers; fieldhands; husbandmen; sailors; mariners; watermen

Phocas, sometimes called Phocas the Gardener (Greek: Φωκᾶς), is venerated as a martyr and saint by the Catholic and Eastern Orthodox Churches. His life and legend may have been a fusion of three men with the same name: a Phocas of Antioch, a Phocas the Gardener and Phocas, Bishop of Sinope.

== Life ==
Catholic tradition states that he was a gardener who lived at Sinope, on the Black Sea, who used his crops to feed the poor and aided persecuted Christians. During the persecutions of Diocletian, he provided hospitality to the soldiers who were sent to execute him. The soldiers, not knowing that their host was their intended victim, agreed to his hospitality. Phocas also offered to help them find the person they were seeking.

As the soldiers slept, Phocas dug his own grave and prayed. He made arrangements for all his possessions to be distributed to the poor after his death. In the morning, when the soldiers awoke, Phocas revealed his identity.

The soldiers hesitated and offered to report to their commander that their search had been fruitless. Phocas refused this offer and bared his neck. He was then decapitated and buried in the grave that he had dug for himself.

== Veneration ==
He is mentioned by Asterius of Amasia (ca. 400). The name Phocas seems to derive from the Greek word for "seal" (phoke/φώκη), which may explain his patronage of sailors and mariners. A sailors' custom was to serve Phocas a portion of every meal; this was called "the portion of St. Phocas." This portion was bought by one of the voyagers and the price was deposited in the hands of the captain. When the ship came into port, the money was distributed among the poor, in thanksgiving to their benefactor for their successful voyage. He is mentioned in the work by Laurentius Surius. This tradition may be connected to a similar practice among sailors in the Baltic Sea of giving food offerings to an invisible sprite known as the Klabautermann.

Phocas is mentioned in W. H. Auden's poem Horae Canonicae, Sext I, verse 6, 2nd line.

== Other gardener saints ==
- Conon the Gardener (or of Pamphylia, Palestine, or Magydos)
- Serenus
- Fiacre
