= Cosmas III of Alexandria =

Greek Patriarch of Alexandria from 1737 to 1746

Saint Cosmas III

Greek Patriarch of Alexandria
- Died: Probably 1746; Alexandria
- Honored in: Eastern Orthodox Church

Cosmas III served as Greek Patriarch of Alexandria between 1737 and 1746. A highly educated cleric, he served as Metropolitan of Pisidia, before being elected to the role of Patriarch of Alexandria.

Preceded by Cosmas II	Greek Patriarch of Alexandria; 1737–1746	Succeeded by Matthew
