= Cosmas III of Constantinople =

Ecumenical Patriarch of Constantinople from 1714 to 1716

- Ecumenical Patriarch of Constantinople
- Church: Church of Constantinople
- In office: 28 February 1714 – 23 March 1716
- Predecessor: Cyprianus of Constantinople
- Successor: Jeremias III of Constantinople

Personal details
- Died: 1736
- Denomination: Eastern Orthodoxy

Cosmas III of Constantinople (Greek: Κοσμᾶς; died 1736) was the Ecumenical Patriarch of Constantinople from 28 February 1714 to 23 March 1716.

== Notes and references ==
Eastern Orthodox Church titles
Preceded by Cyprianus (2)	Ecumenical Patriarch of Constantinople; 1714 – 1716	Succeeded by Jeremias III

Preceded by Samuel	Greek Patriarch of Alexandria; 1712–1714	Succeeded by Samuel

Preceded by Samuel	Greek Patriarch of Alexandria; 1723–1736	Succeeded by Cosmas III
