= September 19 =

September 19 this year in various calendars
- Saturday, 19 September 2026
| Akan | Monomemene |
| Armenian | 1 Sahmi 1476 |
| Aztec | Tititl 12, 6 Xōchitl |
| Babylonian | 6 Ululu, 2337 SE |
| Balinese pawukon | Luang, Pepet, Kajeng, Laba, Wage, Maulu, Saniscara of Parangbakat, Brahma, Gigis, Duka |
| Bengali | 4 Ashshin, BS 1433 |
| Chinese | Yang Fire Monkey・Root Mansion; Fire Horse Year, Month 8, Day 9 (Bailu, 4 days until Qiufen) |
| Common Era | 19 September 2026 CE |
| Coptic | 9 Thout, AM 1743 |
| Egyptian | 6 Mechir, 2775 NE |
| Ethiopian | 9 Maskaram, 2019 Amätä Məhrät |
| French Republican | La Fête du Travail de l'Année 234 de la République |
| Gregorian | 19 September, AD 2026 |
| Hebrew | 8 Tishrei, AM 5787 |
| Hindu | Mūla・Ayuṣmān; Solar: 3 Āśvina, 1948 SE; Lunisolar: Aṣṭamī, Śukla pakṣa of Bhādrapada, 2083 VE; Rāudra・5127 KY・1,872,837 |
| Icelandic | Laugardagur, 26 Tvímánuður 2026 |
| Islamic | 6 Rabi' al-thani, AH 1448 (using tabular method) |
| ISO week date | 2026-W38-6 |
| Japanese | 9 Hazuki, Reiwa 8 (Hakuro, 4 days until Shūbun) |
| Julian | 6 September, AD 2026 (AM 7534) |
| Julian day | 2461303 |
| Korean | 9 Dakdal, 4359 DE |
| Maya | 13.0.13.17.0; 13 Chen, 6 Ahau |
| Roman | ante diem VIII Idus Septembres, MMDCCLXXIX AUC |
| Solar Hijri | 28 Shahrivar, SH 1405 |
| Tibetan | 8 khrums, me pho rta 2153 or 1772 or 1000 |

| << | September | | | | | >> |
| Su | Mo | Tu | We | Th | Fr | Sa |
| | | 1 | 2 | 3 | 4 | 5 |
| 6 | 7 | 8 | 9 | 10 | 11 | 12 |
| 13 | 14 | 15 | 16 | 17 | 18 | 19 |
| 20 | 21 | 22 | 23 | 24 | 25 | 26 |
| 27 | 28 | 29 | 30 |
2026

September 19 in recent years
2026 (Saturday)
2025 (Friday)
2024 (Thursday)
2023 (Tuesday)
2022 (Monday)
2021 (Sunday)
2020 (Saturday)
2019 (Thursday)
2018 (Wednesday)
2017 (Tuesday)

September 19 is the 262nd day of the year (263rd in leap years) in the Gregorian calendar; 103 days remain until the end of the year.

== Events ==
=== Pre-1600 ===
- 96 – Nerva, suspected of complicity of the death of Domitian, is declared emperor by Senate. The Senate then annuls laws passed by Domitian and orders his statues to be destroyed.
- 634 – Siege of Damascus: The Rashidun Arabs under Khalid ibn al-Walid capture Damascus from the Byzantine Empire.
- 1356 – Battle of Poitiers: An English army under the command of Edward the Black Prince defeats a French army and captures King John II.
- 1410 – End of the Siege of Marienburg: The State of the Teutonic Order repulses the joint Polish—Lithuanian forces.

=== 1601–1900 ===
- 1622 – Imperial-Spanish forces under the count of Tilly and Gonzalo Fernández de Córdoba capture Heidelberg, the capital of the Palatinate during the Thirty Years' War.
- 1676 – Jamestown is burned to the ground by the forces of Nathaniel Bacon during Bacon's Rebellion.
- 1777 – American Revolutionary War: British forces win a tactically expensive victory over the Continental Army in the First Battle of Saratoga.
- 1778 – The Continental Congress passes the first United States federal budget.
- 1796 – George Washington's Farewell Address is printed across America as an open letter to the public.
- 1799 – French Revolutionary Wars: French-Dutch victory against the Russians and British in the Battle of Bergen.
- 1846 – Two French shepherd children, Mélanie Calvat and Maximin Giraud, experience a Marian apparition on a mountaintop near La Salette, France, now known as Our Lady of La Salette.
- 1852 – Annibale de Gasparis discovers the asteroid Massalia from the north dome of the Astronomical Observatory of Capodimonte.
- 1862 – American Civil War: Union troops under William Rosecrans defeat a Confederate force commanded by Sterling Price.
- 1863 – American Civil War: The first day of the Battle of Chickamauga, in northwestern Georgia, the bloodiest two-day battle of the conflict, and the only significant Confederate victory in the war's Western Theater.
- 1864 – American Civil War: Union troops under Philip Sheridan defeat a Confederate force commanded by Jubal Early. With over 50,000 troops engaged, it was the largest battle fought in the Shenandoah Valley.
- 1868 – La Gloriosa begins in Spain.
- 1870 – Franco-Prussian War: The siege of Paris begins. The city held out for over four months before surrendering.
- 1893 – In New Zealand, the Electoral Act of 1893 is consented to by the governor, giving all women in New Zealand the right to vote.

=== 1901–present ===
- 1902 – A stampede at Shiloh Baptist Church in Birmingham, Alabama, leads to the death of 115 attendees.
- 1916 – World War I: During the East African Campaign, colonial forces of the Belgian Congo (Force Publique) under the command of Charles Tombeur capture the town of Tabora after heavy fighting.
- 1918 – The battle of Megiddo begins in which British forces attack the right flank of the Ottoman army during World War I.
- 1926 – Football stadium San Siro is inaugurated in Milan, Italy
- 1939 – World War II: The Battle of Kępa Oksywska concludes, with Polish losses reaching roughly 14% of all the forces engaged.
- 1940 – World War II: Witold Pilecki is voluntarily captured and sent to Auschwitz concentration camp to gather and smuggle out information for the resistance movement.
- 1944 – World War II: The Battle of Hürtgen Forest begins. It will become the second-longest individual battle that the U.S. Army has ever fought.
- 1944 – World War II: The Moscow Armistice between Finland and the Soviet Union is signed, which officially ended the Continuation War.
- 1946 – The Council of Europe is founded following a speech by Winston Churchill at the University of Zurich.
- 1950 – Korean War: An attack by North Korean forces was repelled at the Battle of Nam River.
- 1960 – Indian Prime Minister Jawaharlal Nehru and Pakistani President Ayub Khan sign the Indus Waters Treaty for the control and management of the Indus, Chenab, Jhelum, Ravi, Sutlej and Beas rivers.
- 1970 – Michael Eavis hosts the first Glastonbury Festival.
- 1970 – Kostas Georgakis, a Greek student of geology, sets himself ablaze in Matteotti Square in Genoa, Italy, as a protest against the dictatorial regime of Georgios Papadopoulos.
- 1976 – Turkish Airlines Flight 452 hits the Taurus Mountains, outskirt of Karatepe, Turkey, killing all 154 passengers and crew.
- 1976 – Two Imperial Iranian Air Force F-4 Phantom II jets fly out to investigate an unidentified flying object.
- 1978 – The Solomon Islands join the United Nations.
- 1982 – Scott Fahlman posts the first documented emoticons :-) and :-( on the Carnegie Mellon University bulletin board system.
- 1983 – Saint Kitts and Nevis gains its independence.
- 1985 – A strong earthquake kills thousands and destroys about 400 buildings in Mexico City.
- 1985 – Tipper Gore and other political wives form the Parents Music Resource Center as Frank Zappa, John Denver, and other musicians testify at U.S. Congressional hearings on obscenity in rock music.
- 1989 – A bomb destroys UTA Flight 772 in mid-air above the Tùnùrù Desert, Niger, killing all 170 passengers and crew.
- 1991 – Ötzi the Iceman is discovered in the Alps on the border between Italy and Austria.
- 1995 – The Washington Post and The New York Times publish the Unabomber Manifesto.
- 1997 – The Guelb El-Kebir massacre in Algeria kills 53 people.
- 2006 – The Thai army stages a coup. The Constitution is revoked and martial law is declared.
- 2008 – A Learjet 60 carrying musicians Travis Barker and Adam "DJ AM" Goldstein crashes during a rejected takeoff from Colombia Metropolitan Airport in West Columbia, South Carolina, killing four of the six people on board. Barker and Goldstein both survive.
- 2010 – The leaking oil well in the Deepwater Horizon oil spill is sealed.
- 2011 – Mariano Rivera of the New York Yankees surpasses Trevor Hoffman to become Major League Baseball's all-time career saves leader with 602.
- 2016 – In the wake of a manhunt, the suspect in a series of bombings in New York and New Jersey is apprehended after a shootout with police.
- 2017 – The 2017 Puebla earthquake strikes Mexico, causing 370 deaths and over 6,000 injuries, as well as extensive damage.
- 2021 – The Cumbre Vieja volcano, on the island of La Palma in the Canary Islands, erupts. The eruption lasts for almost three months, ending on December 13.
- 2022 – The state funeral of Queen Elizabeth II of the United Kingdom is held at Westminster Abbey, London.
- 2022 – A strong earthquake kills 2 and injures over 30 in Mexico's state of Michoacán.
- 2023 – Azerbaijan launches a military offensive against the Republic of Artsakh in the Nagorno-Karabakh region; this leads to the flight of the Armenian population.

== Births ==
=== Pre-1600 ===
- AD 86 – Antoninus Pius, Roman emperor (died 161)
- 866 – Leo VI the Wise, Byzantine emperor (died 912)
- 931 – Mu Zong, emperor of the Liao Dynasty (died 969)
- 1377 – Albert IV, Duke of Austria (died 1404)
- 1426 – Marie of Cleves, Duchess of Orléans, French noble (died 1487)
- 1477 – Ferrante d'Este, Ferrarese nobleman and condottiero (died 1540)
- 1551 – Henry III of France (died 1589)
- 1560 – Thomas Cavendish, English naval explorer, led the third expedition to circumnavigate the globe (died 1592)

=== 1601–1900 ===
- 1608 – Alfonso Litta, Roman Catholic cardinal and archbishop (died 1679)
- 1638 – Isaac Milles, English minister (died 1720)
- 1662 – Jean-Paul Bignon, French priest and man of letters (died 1743)
- 1721 – William Robertson, Scottish historian (died 1793)
- 1749 – Jean Baptiste Joseph Delambre, French mathematician and astronomer (died 1822)
- 1754 – John Ross Key, American lieutenant, lawyer, and judge (died 1821)
- 1759 – William Kirby, English priest and entomologist (died 1850)
- 1778 – Henry Brougham, 1st Baron Brougham and Vaux, Scottish lawyer and politician, Lord Chancellor of Great Britain (died 1868)
- 1796 – Hartley Coleridge, English poet and author (died 1849)
- 1802 – Lajos Kossuth, Hungarian journalist, lawyer, and politician, Governor-President of Hungary (died 1894)
- 1803 – Maria Anna of Savoy (died 1884)
- 1811 – Orson Pratt, American mathematician and religious leader (died 1881)
- 1824 – William Sellers, American engineer, inventor, and businessperson (died 1905)
- 1828 – Fridolin Anderwert, Swiss judge and politician, President of the Swiss National Council (died 1880)
- 1856 – Arthur Morgan, Australian politician, 16th Premier of Queensland (died 1916)
- 1865 – Frank Eugene, American-German photographer (died 1936)
- 1867 – Arthur Rackham, English illustrator (died 1939)
- 1869 – Ben Turpin, American comedian and actor (died 1940)
- 1871 – Frederick Ruple, Swiss-American painter (died 1938)
- 1882 – Christopher Stone, English radio host (died 1965)
- 1883 – Mabel Vernon, American educator and activist (died 1975)
- 1887 – Lovie Austin, American pianist, composer, and bandleader (died 1972)
- 1887 – Lynne Overman, American actor and singer (died 1943)
- 1888 – James Waddell Alexander II, American mathematician and topologist (died 1971)
- 1888 – Porter Hall, American actor (died 1953)
- 1889 – Sarah Louise Delany, American physician and author (died 1999)
- 1894 – Rachel Field, American author and poet (died 1942)
- 1898 – Giuseppe Saragat, Italian lawyer and politician, 5th President of Italy (died 1988)
- 1900 – Ricardo Cortez, American actor (died 1977)

=== 1901–present ===
- 1905 – Judith Auer, German World War II resistance fighter (died 1944)
- 1905 – Leon Jaworski, American Watergate scandal special prosecutor (died 1982)
- 1908 – Paul Bénichou, French historian, author, and critic (died 2001)
- 1908 – Robert Lecourt, French lawyer, judge, and politician, Lord Chancellor of France (died 2004)
- 1908 – Tatsuo Shimabuku, Japanese martial artist, founded Isshin-ryū (died 1975)
- 1910 – Margaret Lindsay, American actress (died 1981)
- 1910 – Arturo M. Tolentino, Filipino diplomat and politician (died 2004)
- 1912 – Reuben David, Indian veterinarian and zoo founder (died 1989)
- 1912 – Kurt Sanderling, Polish-German conductor (died 2011)
- 1913 – Frances Farmer, American actress (died 1970)
- 1913 – Helen Ward, American singer (died 1998)
- 1915 – Germán Valdés, Mexican actor, singer, and producer (died 1973)
- 1918 – Pablita Velarde, Santa Clara Pueblo (Native American) painter (died 2006)
- 1919 – Roger Grenier, French journalist and author (died 2017)
- 1919 – Amalia Hernández, Mexican choreographer and dancer (died 2000)
- 1919 – Earl R. Fox, U.S. Navy and Coast Guard veteran; last active U.S. servicemember to serve in World War II (died 2012)
- 1920 – Roger Angell, American journalist, author, and editor (died 2022)
- 1921 – Paulo Freire, Brazilian philosopher, theorist, and academic (died 1997)
- 1921 – Billy Ward, American R&B singer-songwriter (died 2002)
- 1922 – Damon Knight, American author and critic (died 2002)
- 1922 – Willie Pep, American boxer and referee (died 2006)
- 1922 – Emil Zátopek, Czech runner (died 2000)
- 1924 – Vern Benson, American baseball player, coach, and manager (died 2014)
- 1924 – Don Harron, Canadian actor and screenwriter (died 2015)
- 1925 – W. Reece Smith Jr., American lawyer and academic (died 2013)
- 1926 – Victoria Barbă, Moldovan animated film director (died 2020)
- 1926 – Masatoshi Koshiba, Japanese physicist and academic, Nobel Prize laureate (died 2020)
- 1926 – James Lipton, American actor, producer, and screenwriter (died 2020)
- 1926 – Duke Snider, American baseball player and sportscaster (died 2011)
- 1926 – Margarita Andrey, Spanish actress (died 2026)
- 1927 – Helen Carter, American singer (died 1998)
- 1927 – Rosemary Harris, English actress
- 1927 – William Hickey, American actor (died 1997)
- 1927 – Nick Massi, American singer and bass player (died 2000)
- 1929 – Marge Roukema, American educator and politician (died 2014)
- 1930 – Muhal Richard Abrams, American pianist, composer, and educator (died 2017)
- 1930 – Bettye Lane, American photographer and journalist (died 2012)
- 1930 – Antonio Margheriti, Italian director, producer, and screenwriter (died 2002)
- 1931 – Brook Benton, American pop/R&B/rock & roll singer-songwriter (died 1988)
- 1931 – Derek Gardner, English engineer (died 2011)
- 1932 – Mike Royko, American journalist and author (died 1997)
- 1932 – Stefanie Zweig, German journalist and author (died 2014)
- 1933 – Gilles Archambault, Canadian journalist and author
- 1934 – Brian Epstein, English businessman, The Beatles manager (died 1967)
- 1934 – Austin Mitchell, English journalist, academic and politician (died 2021)
- 1935 – Benjamin Thurman Hacker, American admiral (died 2003)
- 1936 – Martin Fay, Irish fiddler (died 2012)
- 1936 – Milan Marcetta, Canadian ice hockey player (died 2014)
- 1936 – Al Oerter, American discus thrower (died 2007)
- 1937 – Abner Haynes, American football player (died 2024)
- 1939 – Carl Schultz, Hungarian-Australian director, producer, and screenwriter
- 1940 – Zandra Rhodes, English fashion designer, founded the Fashion and Textile Museum
- 1940 – Sylvia Tyson, Canadian singer-songwriter (Ian & Sylvia, Quartette)
- 1941 – Umberto Bossi, Italian politician (died 2026)
- 1941 – Cass Elliot, American singer-songwriter, actress, comedian, and television personality (died 1974)
- 1941 – Jim Fox, English pentathlete (died 2023)
- 1941 – Mariangela Melato, Italian actress (died 2013)
- 1943 – André Boudrias, Canadian ice hockey player and coach (died 2019)
- 1943 – Joe Morgan, American baseball player (died 2020)
- 1944 – Anders Björck, Swedish politician, 25th Swedish Minister of Defence
- 1944 – Edmund Joensen, Faroese politician, 9th Prime Minister of the Faroe Islands
- 1944 – İsmet Özel, Turkish poet and scholar
- 1945 – Kate Adie, English journalist and author
- 1945 – David Bromberg, American bluegrass-folk-rock-jazz singer, songwriter, and musician
- 1947 – Henry Bromell, American novelist and screenwriter (died 2013)
- 1947 – Tanith Lee, English author (died 2015)
- 1948 – Jim Ard, American basketball player
- 1948 – Mykhaylo Fomenko, Ukrainian footballer and manager (died 2024)
- 1948 – Jeremy Irons, English actor, winner of multiple accolades (Oscar, Tony, Emmy, Golden Globe)
- 1949 – Ringo Mendoza, Mexican wrestler
- 1949 – Barry Scheck, American lawyer, co-founded the Innocence Project
- 1949 – Sidney Wicks, American basketball player
- 1950 – Joan Lunden, American journalist and news host
- 1950 – Michael Proctor, English physicist, mathematician, and academic
- 1951 – Daniel Lanois, Canadian singer-songwriter, guitarist, and producer
- 1952 – Rhys Chatham, American trumpet player, guitarist, and composer
- 1952 – Henry Kaiser, American guitarist and composer
- 1952 – George Warrington, American businessman (died 2007)
- 1953 – Wayne Clark, Australian cricketer
- 1953 – Sarana VerLin, American singer-songwriter and violinist
- 1954 – Adam Phillips, Welsh psychotherapist and author
- 1954 – Eleni Vitali, Greek singer-songwriter
- 1955 – Richard Burmer, American composer and engineer (died 2006)
- 1957 – Dan Hampton, American football player
- 1957 – Chris Roupas, American basketball player
- 1960 – Loïc Bigois, French aerodynamicist and engineer
- 1960 – Yolanda Saldívar, American convicted murderer
- 1961 – Artur Ekert, Polish-British physicist and academic
- 1962 – Randy Myers, American baseball player
- 1962 – Ken Rosenthal, American sportscaster
- 1963 – Jarvis Cocker, English singer-songwriter and guitarist
- 1963 – David Seaman, English footballer
- 1963 – Urmas Tartes, Estonian biologist and photographer
- 1964 – Patrick Marber, English actor, director, and screenwriter
- 1964 – Trisha Yearwood, American country singer
- 1965 – Andrew Leeds, Australian rugby player and coach
- 1966 – Soledad O'Brien, American journalist
- 1966 – Yoshihiro Takayama, Japanese wrestler and mixed martial artist
- 1967 – Jim Abbott, American baseball player
- 1967 – Aleksandr Karelin, Russian wrestler and politician
- 1969 – Candy Dulfer, Dutch saxophonist
- 1969 – Jacek Frąckiewicz, Polish footballer
- 1969 – Alkinoos Ioannidis, Cypriot singer-songwriter and guitarist
- 1969 – Kostya Tszyu, Russian-Australian boxer
- 1969 – Tapio Wilska, Finnish singer-songwriter
- 1970 – Gilbert Dionne, Canadian ice hockey player
- 1970 – Antoine Hey, German footballer and manager
- 1971 – Mike Sadlo, German footballer and manager
- 1972 – Ryan Girdler, Australian rugby league player
- 1972 – N. K. Jemisin, American science fiction and fantasy writer
- 1972 – Ashot Nadanian, Armenian chess player and coach
- 1973 – Jacinta Allan, Australian politician, 49th Premier of Victoria
- 1973 – Nick Colgan, Irish footballer and coach
- 1973 – Cristiano da Matta, Brazilian racing driver
- 1973 – Javier Duarte, Mexican politician
- 1973 – David Zepeda, Mexican actor, model and singer
- 1974 – Jimmy Fallon, American comedian, television host, actor, singer, writer, and producer
- 1974 – Hidetaka Miyazaki, Japanese video game designer and executive
- 1975 – Marcus Dunstan, American director and screenwriter
- 1976 – Raja Bell, American basketball player
- 1976 – Jan Hlaváč, Czech ice hockey player
- 1976 – Sergey Tsinkevich, Belarusian footballer and referee
- 1977 – Poon Yiu Cheuk, Hong Kong footballer and coach
- 1977 – Aakash Chopra, Indian cricketer
- 1977 – Ryan Dusick, American musician and record producer
- 1977 – Tommaso Rocchi, Italian footballer
- 1977 – Mike Smith, American baseball player
- 1977 – Emil Sutovsky, Israeli chess player
- 1978 – Nick Johnson, American baseball player
- 1978 – Brett Keisel, American football player
- 1978 – Jorge López Montaña, Spanish footballer
- 1979 – Mikael Tellqvist, Swedish ice hockey player
- 1980 – J. R. Bremer, American-Bosnian basketball player
- 1980 – James Ellison, English motorcycle racer
- 1980 – Twin sisters Tegan and Sara Quin, Canadian indie pop duo
- 1980 – Dimitri Yachvili, French rugby player
- 1981 – Damiano Cunego, Italian cyclist
- 1982 – Eduardo Carvalho, Portuguese footballer
- 1982 – Eleni Daniilidou, Greek tennis player
- 1983 – Katharina Kucharowits, Austrian politician
- 1983 – Carl Landry, American basketball player
- 1983 – Joni Pitkänen, Finnish ice hockey player
- 1984 – Eva Marie, American wrestler
- 1984 – Ángel Reyna, Mexican footballer
- 1985 – Alun Wyn Jones, Welsh rugby player
- 1985 – Song Joong-ki, South Korean actor
- 1985 – Nathanael Liminski, German politician
- 1985 – Renee Paquette, Canadian-American television personality
- 1986 – Leon Best, English footballer
- 1986 – Sally Pearson, Australian athlete and hurdler
- 1987 – Carlos Quintero, Colombian footballer
- 1989 – George Springer, American baseball player
- 1990 – Saki Fukuda, Japanese actress and singer
- 1990 – Savvas Gentsoglou, Greek footballer
- 1990 – Stephon Gilmore, American football player
- 1990 – Kieran Trippier, English footballer
- 1991 – CJ McCollum, American basketball player
- 1992 – Jiro Kuroshio, Japanese wrestler
- 1992 – Palmer Luckey, American entrepreneur
- 1992 – Diego Antonio Reyes, Mexican footballer
- 1993 – Pi'erre Bourne, American record producer and rapper
- 1995 – Brent Faiyaz, American singer
- 1995 – Rachel Sennott, American actress
- 1996 – Brandon Clarke, Canadian-American basketball player (died 2026)
- 1996 – Dejounte Murray, American basketball player
- 1996 – Chris Silva, Gabonese basketball player
- 1998 – Nolan Patrick, Canadian ice hockey player
- 1998 – Trae Young, American basketball player
- 1999 – Precious Achiuwa, Nigerian basketball player

== Deaths ==
=== Pre-1600 ===
- 643 – Goeric of Metz, Frankish bishop and saint
- 690 – Theodore of Tarsus, English archbishop and saint (born 602)
- 961 – Helena Lekapene, Byzantine empress
- 979 – Gotofredo I, archbishop of Milan
- 1123 – Emperor Taizu of Jin (born 1068)
- 1147 – Igor II of Kiev
- 1339 – Emperor Go-Daigo of Japan (born 1288)
- 1356 – Peter I, Duke of Bourbon (born 1311)
- 1356 – Walter VI, Count of Brienne (born 1304)
- 1580 – Catherine Brandon, Duchess of Suffolk, English noblewoman (born 1519)
- 1589 – Jean-Antoine de Baïf, French poet (born 1532)

=== 1601–1900 ===
- 1605 – Edward Lewknor, English politician (born 1542)
- 1668 – William Waller, English general and politician (born 1597)
- 1692 – Giles Corey, American farmer and accused wizard (born c. 1612)
- 1710 – Ole Rømer, Danish astronomer and instrument maker (born 1644)
- 1812 – Mayer Amschel Rothschild, German banker (born 1744)
- 1843 – Gaspard-Gustave de Coriolis, French mathematician, physicist, and engineer (born 1792)
- 1863 – Hans Christian Heg, Norwegian-American colonel and politician (born 1829)
- 1868 – William Sprague, American minister and politician (born 1809)
- 1873 – Robert Mackenzie, Scottish-Australian politician, 3rd Premier of Queensland (born 1811)
- 1881 – James A. Garfield, American general, lawyer, and politician, and the 20th President of the United States (born 1831)
- 1893 – Alexander Tilloch Galt, English-Canadian politician, 1st Canadian Minister of Finance (born 1817)

=== 1901–present ===
- 1902 – Masaoka Shiki, Japanese poet, author, and critic (born 1867)
- 1905 – Thomas John Barnardo, Irish-English philanthropist (born 1845)
- 1906 – Maria Georgina Grey, English educator, founded the Girls' Day School Trust (born 1816)
- 1924 – Alick Bannerman, Australian cricketer and coach (born 1854)
- 1927 – Michael Ancher, Danish painter (born 1849)
- 1935 – Konstantin Tsiolkovsky, Russian scientist and engineer (born 1857)
- 1936 – Vishnu Narayan Bhatkhande, Indian singer and musicologist (born 1860)
- 1942 – Condé Montrose Nast, American publisher, founded Condé Nast Publications (born 1873)
- 1944 – Guy Gibson, British commander, Victoria Cross recipient (born 1918)
- 1949 – George Shiels, Irish-Canadian playwright (born 1886)
- 1949 – Nikos Skalkottas, Greek violinist and composer (born 1901)
- 1955 – John D. Dingell Sr., American journalist and politician (born 1894)
- 1965 – Lionel Terray, French mountaineer (born 1921)
- 1967 – Zinaida Serebriakova, Russian-French painter (born 1884)
- 1968 – Chester Carlson, American physicist and lawyer (born 1906)
- 1968 – Red Foley, American singer-songwriter and actor (born 1910)
- 1972 – Robert Casadesus, French pianist and composer (born 1899)
- 1973 – Gram Parsons, American singer-songwriter and guitarist (born 1946)
- 1975 – Pamela Brown, English actress (born 1917)
- 1978 – Étienne Gilson, French historian and philosopher (born 1884)
- 1983 – Ángel Labruna, Argentine footballer and manager (born 1918)
- 1985 – Italo Calvino, Italian novelist, short story writer, and journalist (born 1923)
- 1987 – Einar Gerhardsen, Norwegian civil servant and politician, 1st Prime Minister of Norway (born 1897)
- 1989 – Willie Steele, American long jumper (born 1923)
- 1990 – Hermes Pan, American dancer and choreographer (born 1910)
- 1992 – Jacques Pic, French chef (born 1932)
- 1995 – Orville Redenbacher, American businessman, founded his own eponymous brand (born 1907)
- 1998 – Patricia Hayes, English actress (born 1909)
- 2000 – Ann Doran, American actress (born 1911)
- 2001 – Rhys Jones, Welsh-Australian archaeologist and academic (born 1941)
- 2002 – Robert Guéï, Ivorian politician, 3rd President of Côte d'Ivoire (born 1941)
- 2003 – Slim Dusty, Australian singer-songwriter, guitarist, and producer (born 1927)
- 2004 – Eddie Adams, American photographer and journalist (born 1933)
- 2004 – Skeeter Davis, American singer-songwriter (born 1931)
- 2004 – Damayanti Joshi, Indian dancer and choreographer (born 1928)
- 2004 – Ellis Marsalis Sr., American businessman and activist (born 1908)
- 2006 – Elizabeth Allen, American actress (born 1929)
- 2006 – Danny Flores, American singer-songwriter and saxophonist (born 1929)
- 2006 – Martha Holmes, American photographer and journalist (born 1923)
- 2006 – Roy Schuiten, Dutch cyclist and manager (born 1950)
- 2008 – Earl Palmer, American rhythm and blues drummer (born 1924)
- 2009 – Milton Meltzer, American historian and author (born 1915)
- 2009 – Eduard Zimmermann, German journalist (born 1929)
- 2011 – Thomas Capano, American lawyer and politician, and convicted murderer (born 1949)
- 2011 – Dolores Hope, American singer (born 1909)
- 2011 – George Cadle Price, 1st Prime Minister of Belize (born 1919)
- 2012 – Rino Ferrario, Italian footballer (born 1926)
- 2012 – Itamar Singer, Romanian-Israeli historian and author (born 1946)
- 2012 – Earl R. Fox, U.S. Navy and Coast Guard veteran; last active U.S. servicemember to serve in World War II (born 1919)
- 2013 – Robert Barnard, English author and critic (born 1936)
- 2013 – John Reger, American football player (born 1931)
- 2013 – William Ungar, Polish-American author and philanthropist, founded the National Envelope Corporation (born 1913)
- 2013 – John D. Vanderhoof, American banker and politician, 37th Governor of Colorado (born 1922)
- 2013 – Hiroshi Yamauchi, Japanese businessman (born 1927)
- 2014 – Audrey Long, American actress (born 1922)
- 2015 – Jackie Collins, English novelist (born 1937)
- 2015 – Todd Ewen, Canadian ice hockey player and coach (born 1966)
- 2015 – Masajuro Shiokawa, Japanese economist and politician, 63rd Japanese Minister of Finance (born 1921)
- 2017 – Leonid Kharitonov, Russian bass-baritone (born 1933)
- 2018 – Arthur Mitchell, American ballet dancer & choreographer (born 1934)
- 2018 – Bernard "Bunny" Carr, Irish TV presenter (born 1927)
- 2019 – Zine El Abidine Ben Ali, Tunisian soldier, politician, 2nd President of Tunisia (born 1936)
- 2020 – John Turner, Canadian politician, 17th Prime Minister of Canada (born 1929)
- 2021 – John Challis, English actor (born 1942)
- 2021 – Jimmy Greaves, English footballer (born 1940)
- 2021 – Dinky Soliman, Filipino politician, 23rd Secretary of Social Welfare and Development (born 1953)
- 2026 – Sandro Mazzola, Italian footballer and sportscaster (born 1942)
- 2026 – Nathaniel Waena, Solomon Islands diplomat, 5th Governor-General of Solomon Islands (born 1945)

== Holidays and observances ==
- Christian feast day:
  - Alonso de Orozco Mena
  - Emilie de Rodat
  - Blessed Francisca Cualladó Baixauli
  - Goeric of Metz
  - Januarius (Western Christianity)
    - Feast of San Gennaro
  - Maria de Cervelló
  - Our Lady of La Salette
  - Theodore of Tarsus (Anglican Communion, Roman Catholic Church, Eastern Orthodox Church)
  - Trophimus, Sabbatius, and Dorymedon
  - September 19 (Eastern Orthodox liturgics)
- Armed Forces Day (Chile)
- Day of the First Public Appearance of the Slovak National Council
- Second day of Fiestas Patrias (Chile)
- Independence Day, celebrates the independence of Saint Kitts and Nevis from the United Kingdom in 1983.
- International Talk Like a Pirate Day
