= September 19 (Eastern Orthodox liturgics) =

Day in the Eastern Orthodox liturgical calendar

Eastern Orthodox liturgical calendar
September 18	September 19	September 20
September 19 O.S. ≍ October 2 N.S. September 19 N.S ≍ September 6 O.S.

An Eastern Orthodox cross

September 19 in Eastern Orthodox liturgical calendars is a feast day and a day of commemoration of saints and martyrs. Although some Orthodox churches use the Revised Julian Calendar and others use the traditional Julian calendar, the fixed commemorations for their respective September 19 are broadly the same, no matter which calendar is used. (Note: Despite the dates being the same, the days to which they refer typically differ by 13 days. The notation Old Style or O.S. is sometimes used to indicate a date in the traditional Julian Calendar (the "Old Calendar"). The notation New Style or N.S. indicates a date in the Revised Julian calendar (the "New Calendar").)

== Saints ==
- Martyrs Trophimus, Sabbatius, and Dorymedon of Synnada (276-282) (Note: "The same day, the holy martyrs Trophimus, Sabbatius, and Dorymedon, senator, under the emperor Probus. By command of the governor Atticus, at Antioch, Sabbatius was scourged until he expired. Trophimus was sent to the governor Perennius at Synnada, where he and the senator Dorymedon consummated their martyrdom by decapitation, after enduring many torments.") (see also: October 31)
- Martyr Zosimas, hermit of Cilicia (4th century)

== Pre-Schism Western saints ==
- Saint Felix and Constantia, martyrs under Nero in Nocera near Naples, in Italy (1st century) (Note: "At Nocera, the birthday of the holy martyrs Felix and Constantia, who suffered under Nero.")
- Hieromartyrs Januarius, Bishop of Benevento, and his companions, at Pozzuoli (305): (Note: Januarius, Bishop of Benevento in Italy, was beheaded, perhaps with others, at Pozzuoli under Diocletian. His relics were enshrined in Naples of which he became the patron-saint. The annual miracle of the liquefaction of his blood is famous.) (Note: "AT Puzzoli, in Campania, the holy martyrs Januarius, bishop of Benevento, Festus, his deacon, and Desiderius, lector, together with Sosius, deacon of the church of Misenum, Proculus, deacon of Puzzoli, Eutychius and Acutius, who were bound and imprisoned and then beheaded during the reign of Diocletian. The body of St. Januarius was brought to Naples, and buried in the church with due honors, where even now the blood of the blessed martyr is kept in a vial, and when placed close to his head, is seen to become liquid and, bubble up as if it were just taken from his veins.") (see also: April 21 - East)

- Festus, Proclus, and Sossius, Deacons;
- Martyrs Desiderius, Reader, and Gantiol, Eutychius, and Acutius.

- Saint Eustochius, successor of St Brice as Bishop of Tours in France (461)
- Saint Seguanos (Sequanus, Seine, Sigo), in the diocese of Langres in Gaul, Confessor (580)
- Saint Goeric (Abbo), successor of St Arnulf as Bishop of Metz in France (647)
- Saint Pomposa, a nun at Peñamelaria near Cordoba in Spain, beheaded by the Moors in Cordoba (853)
- Saint Theodore of Tarsus, Archbishop of Canterbury (690) (Note: A Greek who was educated in Tarsus in Cilicia, he spent some time at Athens and became a monk in Rome. He was aged sixty-six when Pope Vitalian appointed him to Canterbury at the suggestion of the African St Adrian in 666. They travelled to England together, Adrian becoming Abbot of Sts Peter and Paul in Canterbury. Theodore is rightly called the second founder of Canterbury. He visited all parts of the country, consolidated or re-established dioceses, promoted learning and held the first national Council in Hertford in 672. St Theodore is one of the greatest figures in English history.) (Note: "At Canterbury, the holy bishop Theodore, who was sent to England by pope Vitalian, and was renowned for learning and holiness.")

== Post-Schism Orthodox saints ==
- Blessed Igor (George), tonsured Gabriel, great prince of Chernigov and Kiev (1147)
- Blessed Prince Theodore of Smolensk and Yaroslavl (1299) and his children Saints David (1321) and Constantine (c. 1322)

=== New martyrs and confessors ===
- New Hieromartyr Constantine (Golubev), Priest, of Bogorodsk, and two martyrs with him (1918) (Note: See: (in Russian) Голубев, Константин Алексеевич. Википедии. (Russian Wikipedia).) (see also: November 7 - Uncovering)
- New Hieromartyr Nicholas Iskrovsky, Protopresbyter (1919)
- Venerable Alexis, Hiero-Schemamonk of Zosima Hermitage (1928)
- New Hieromartyr Constantine Bogoslovsky, Priest (1937)
- New Martyr Nilus Smirnov, Priest (1938)
- Virgin-martyr Mary (Mamontova-Shashin), at Bamlag (1938)

== Icon gallery ==
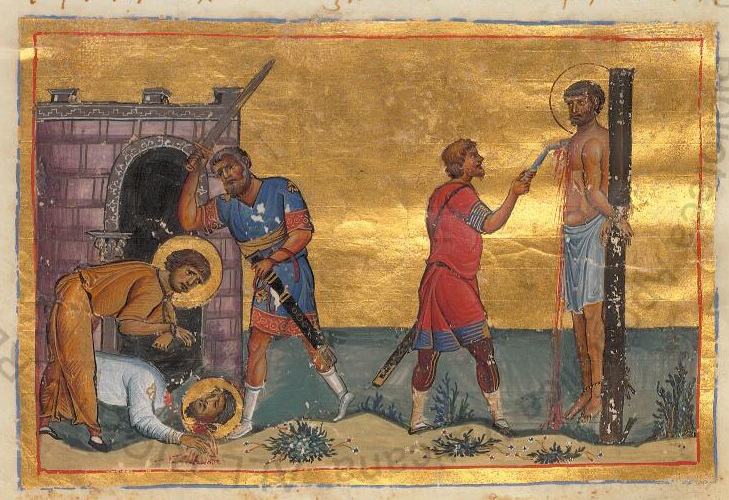
Martyrs Trophimus, Sabbatius, and Dorymedon of Synada.
(Menologion of Basil II, 10th century).

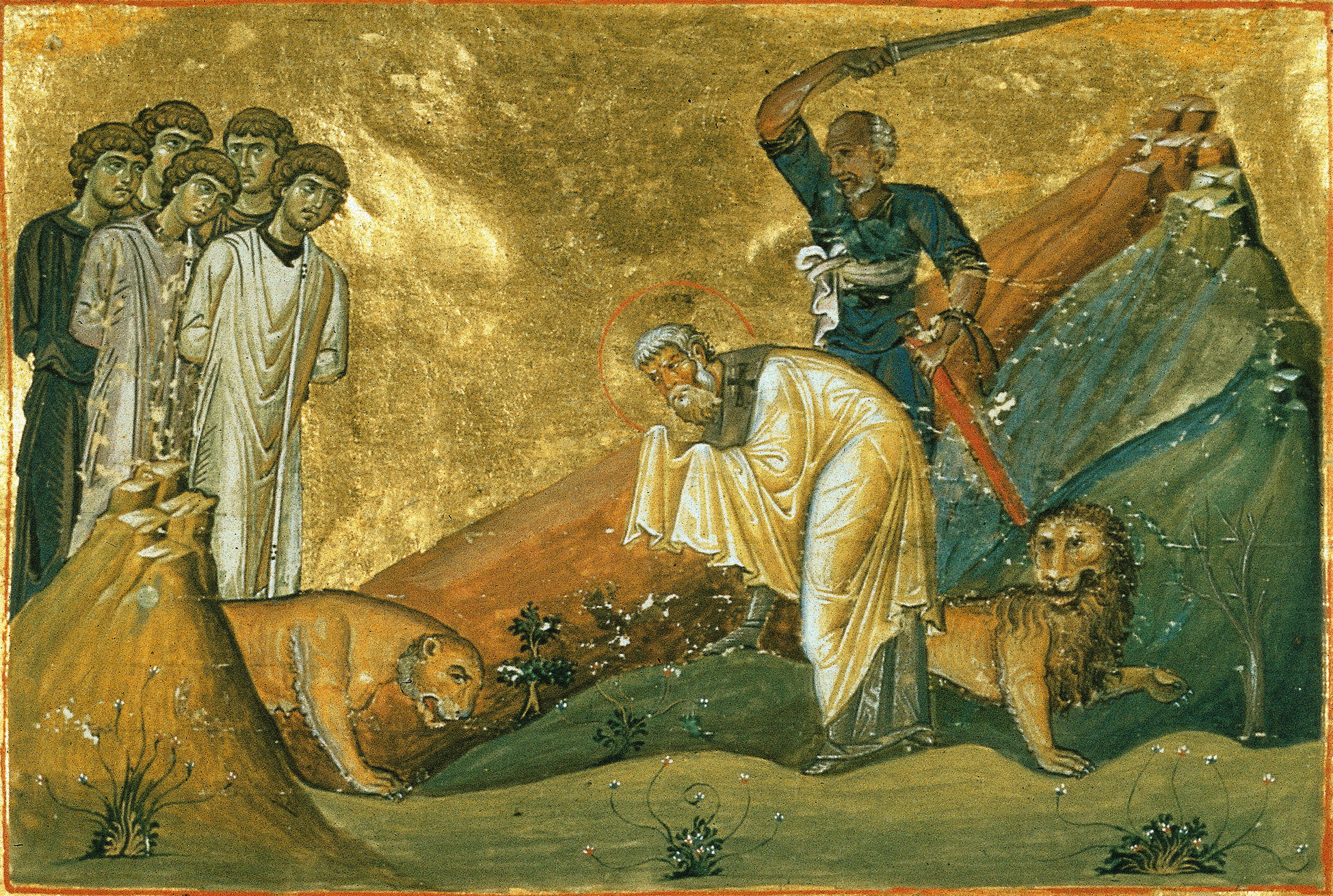
Hieromartyrs Januarius, Bishop of Benevento, and his companions, at Pozzuoli.
(Menologion of Basil II, 10th century).

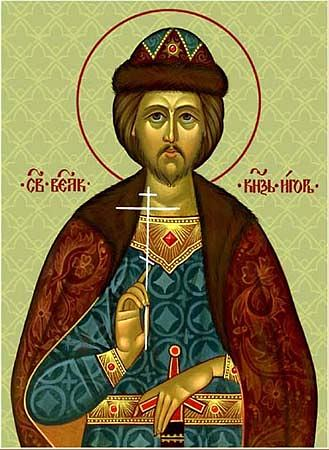
Blessed Igor (George), tonsured Gabriel, great prince of Chernigov.

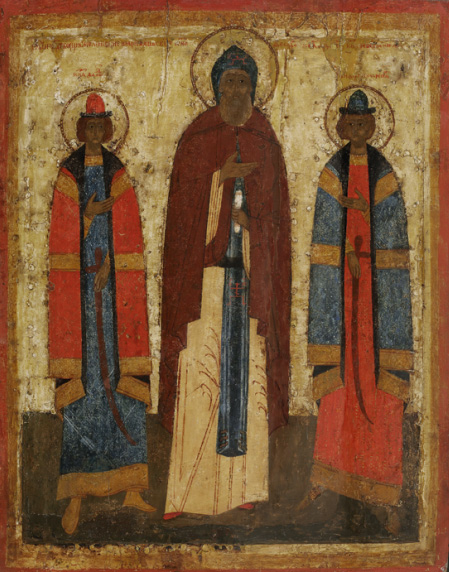
Sts. Prince Theodore of Smolensk and his children Saints David and Constantine.

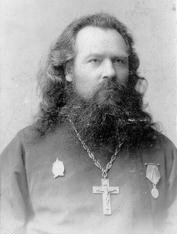
New Hieromartyr Constantine Golubev, Archpriest.

== Sources ==
- September 19/October 2. Orthodox Calendar (PRAVOSLAVIE.RU).
- October 2 / September 19. HOLY TRINITY RUSSIAN ORTHODOX CHURCH (A parish of the Patriarchate of Moscow).
- September 19. OCA - The Lives of the Saints.
- The Autonomous Orthodox Metropolia of Western Europe and the Americas (ROCOR). St. Hilarion Calendar of Saints for the year of our Lord 2004. St. Hilarion Press (Austin, TX). p. 70.
- The Nineteenth Day of the Month of September. Orthodoxy in China.
- September 19. Latin Saints of the Orthodox Patriarchate of Rome.
- The Roman Martyrology. Transl. by the Archbishop of Baltimore. Last Edition, According to the Copy Printed at Rome in 1914. Revised Edition, with the Imprimatur of His Eminence Cardinal Gibbons. Baltimore: John Murphy Company, 1916. pp. 289–290.
- Rev. Richard Stanton. A Menology of England and Wales, or, Brief Memorials of the Ancient British and English Saints Arranged According to the Calendar, Together with the Martyrs of the 16th and 17th Centuries. London: Burns & Oates, 1892. pp. 452–454.

Greek Sources

- Great Synaxaristes: (in Greek) 19 ΣΕΠΤΕΜΒΡΙΟΥ. ΜΕΓΑΣ ΣΥΝΑΞΑΡΙΣΤΗΣ.
- (in Greek) Συναξαριστής. 19 Σεπτεμβρίου. ECCLESIA.GR. (H ΕΚΚΛΗΣΙΑ ΤΗΣ ΕΛΛΑΔΟΣ).
- (in Greek) 19/09/2026. Ορθόδοξος Συναξαριστής.

Russian Sources

- (in Russian) 2 октября (19 сентября). Православная Энциклопедия под редакцией Патриарха Московского и всея Руси Кирилла (электронная версия). (Orthodox Encyclopedia - Pravenc.ru).
- (in Russian) 19 сентября по старому стилю / 2 октября по новому стилю. Русская Православная Церковь - Православный церковный календарь на 2026 год.
