= Weinviertel (National Council electoral district) =

Parliamentary electoral district in Austria

- Electoral District for the National Council
- Location of Weinviertel within Austria
- District: List: Hollabrunn; Korneuburg; Mistelbach
- State: Lower Austria
- Population: 222,614 (2024)
- Electorate: 172,337 (2019)
- Area: 2,964 km^{2} (2023)

Current Electoral District
- Created: 1994
- Seats: List: 5 (2017–present); 7 (2002–2017); 6 (1994–2002)
- Members: List: Eva-Maria Himmelbauer (ÖVP); Andreas Minnich (ÖVP)

Weinviertel, also known as Electoral District 3A (German: Wahlkreis 3A), is one of the 39 multi-member regional electoral districts of the National Council, the lower house of the Austrian Parliament, the national legislature of Austria. The electoral district was created in 1992 when electoral regulations were amended to add regional electoral districts to the existing state-wide electoral districts and came into being at the following legislative election in 1994. It consists of the districts of Hollabrunn, Korneuburg and Mistelbach in the state of Lower Austria. The electoral district currently elects five of the 183 members of the National Council using the open party-list proportional representation electoral system. At the 2019 legislative election the constituency had 172,337 registered electors.

== History ==
Weinviertel was one 43 regional electoral districts (regionalwahlkreise) established by the "National Council Electoral Regulations 1992" (Nationalrats-Wahlordnung 1992) passed by the National Council in 1992. It consisted of the districts of Gänserndorf, Hollabrunn, Korneuburg and Mistelbach in the state of Lower Austria. The district was initially allocated six seats in May 1993. Electoral regulations require the allocation of seats amongst the electoral districts to be recalculated following each national census and in September 2002 the number of seats allocated to Weinviertel was increased to seven based on the population as at the 2001 national census.

The Greater Vienna District, which was part of the Greater Vienna regional electoral district, was dissolved in January 2017 and the municipality of Gerasdorf bei Wien to the north-east of Vienna was transferred to Korneuburg District in Weinviertel whilst the entire Gänserndorf District was transferred from Weinviertel to the newly created Lower Austria East regional electoral district. As a result, the number of seats allocated to Weinviertel was reduced to five in February 2017.

== Electoral system ==
Weinviertel currently elects five of the 183 members of the National Council using the open party-list proportional representation electoral system. The allocation of seats is carried out in three stages. In the first stage, seats are allocated to parties (lists) at the regional level using a state-wide Hare quota (wahlzahl) (valid votes in the state divided by the number of seats in the state). In the second stage, seats are allocated to parties at the state/provincial level using the state-wide Hare quota (any seats won by the party at the regional stage are subtracted from the party's state seats). In the third and final stage, seats are allocated to parties at the federal/national level using the D'Hondt method (any seats won by the party at the regional and state stages are subtracted from the party's federal seats). Only parties that reach the 4% national threshold, or have won a seat at the regional stage, compete for seats at the state and federal stages.

Electors may cast one preferential vote for individual candidates at the regional, state and federal levels. Split-ticket voting (panachage), or voting for more than one candidate at each level, is not permitted and will result in the ballot paper being invalidated. At the regional level, candidates must receive preferential votes amounting to at least 14% of the valid votes cast for their party to over-ride the order of the party list (10% and 7% respectively for the state and federal levels). Prior to April 2013 electors could not cast preferential votes at the federal level and the thresholds candidates needed to over-ride the party list order were higher at the regional level (half the Hare quota or 1/6 of the party votes) and state level (Hare quota).

== Election results ==
=== Summary ===
Election	Communists KPÖ+ / KPÖ			Social Democrats SPÖ			Greens GRÜNE			NEOS NEOS / LiF			People's ÖVP			Freedom FPÖ		
Election	Votes	%	Seats	Votes	%	Seats	Votes	%	Seats	Votes	%	Seats	Votes	%	Seats	Votes	%	Seats
2019	661	0.48%	0	24,416	17.60%	0	14,642	10.55%	0	10,545	7.60%	0	64,232	46.30%	2	21,454	15.46%	0
2017	738	0.51%	0	31,774	21.82%	1	3,976	2.73%	0	6,676	4.59%	0	57,779	39.68%	1	36,566	25.11%	1
2013	1,295	0.68%	0	51,617	27.25%	1	15,984	8.44%	0	7,452	3.93%	0	62,417	32.95%	2	36,217	19.12%	1
2008	1,088	0.57%	0	58,080	30.17%	2	13,951	7.25%	0	3,184	1.65%	0	66,027	34.29%	2	35,371	18.37%	1
2006	1,331	0.72%	0	65,648	35.31%	2	14,711	7.91%	0				76,655	41.24%	2	17,990	9.68%	0
2002	800	0.43%	0	66,118	35.55%	2	11,667	6.27%	0	1,435	0.77%	0	93,294	50.17%	3	12,658	6.81%	0
1999	548	0.31%	0	55,500	31.69%	2	9,137	5.22%	0	4,468	2.55%	0	64,028	36.56%	2	38,662	22.07%	1
1995	378	0.21%	0	63,681	35.91%	2	5,842	3.29%	0	7,900	4.45%	0	68,108	38.40%	2	29,386	16.57%	1
1994	317	0.19%	0	54,932	32.23%	2	8,691	5.10%	0	8,759	5.14%	0	64,672	37.94%	2	31,169	18.29%	1

=== Detailed ===
==== 2010s ====
===== 2019 =====
Results of the 2019 legislative election held on 29 September 2019:

Party		Votes per district				Total votes	%	Seats
Party		Holla- brunn	Korneu- burg	Mistel- bach	Voting card	Total votes	%	Seats
Austrian People's Party	ÖVP	16,657	23,766	23,613	196	64,232	46.30%	2
Social Democratic Party of Austria	SPÖ	5,659	10,132	8,528	97	24,416	17.60%	0
Freedom Party of Austria	FPÖ	5,076	8,193	8,080	105	21,454	15.46%	0
The Greens	GRÜNE	2,710	7,210	4,546	176	14,642	10.55%	0
NEOS	NEOS	2,013	5,280	3,166	86	10,545	7.60%	0
JETZT	JETZT	444	1,027	704	29	2,204	1.59%	0
KPÖ Plus	KPÖ+	144	284	228	5	661	0.48%	0
Der Wandel	WANDL	133	236	198	7	574	0.41%	0
Valid Votes		32,836	56,128	49,063	701	138,728	100.00%	2
Rejected Votes		576	669	809	4	2,058	1.46%	
Total Polled		33,412	56,797	49,872	705	140,786	81.69%	
Registered Electors		41,431	69,958	60,948		172,337		
Turnout		80.64%	81.19%	81.83%		81.69%		

The following candidates were elected:

- Party mandates - Eva-Maria Himmelbauer (ÖVP), 7,294 votes; and Andreas Minnich (ÖVP), 3,285 votes.

===== 2017 =====
Results of the 2017 legislative election held on 15 October 2017:

Party		Votes per district				Total votes	%	Seats
Party		Holla- brunn	Korneu- burg	Mistel- bach	Voting card	Total votes	%	Seats
Austrian People's Party	ÖVP	15,124	21,109	21,324	222	57,779	39.68%	1
Freedom Party of Austria	FPÖ	8,606	14,339	13,447	174	36,566	25.11%	1
Social Democratic Party of Austria	SPÖ	6,962	13,746	10,878	188	31,774	21.82%	1
NEOS	NEOS	1,256	3,392	1,947	81	6,676	4.59%	0
Peter Pilz List	PILZ	1,169	3,063	1,808	77	6,117	4.20%	0
The Greens	GRÜNE	715	1,864	1,327	70	3,976	2.73%	0
My Vote Counts!	GILT	306	596	503	12	1,417	0.97%	0
Communist Party of Austria	KPÖ	163	325	237	13	738	0.51%	0
The Whites	WEIßE	47	119	91	0	257	0.18%	0
Free List Austria	FLÖ	102	86	112	0	300	0.21%	0
Valid Votes		34,450	58,639	51,674	837	145,600	100.00%	3
Rejected Votes		471	535	635	11	1,652	1.12%	
Total Polled		34,921	59,174	52,309	848	147,252	85.83%	
Registered Electors		41,362	69,396	60,813		171,571		
Turnout		84.43%	85.27%	86.02%		85.83%		

The following candidates were elected:

- Personal mandates - Eva-Maria Himmelbauer (ÖVP), 9,361 votes.
- Party mandates - Melanie Erasim (SPÖ), 2,175 votes; and Christian Lausch (FPÖ), 2,371 votes.

===== 2013 =====
Results of the 2013 legislative election held on 29 September 2013:

Party		Votes per district					Total votes	%	Seats
Party		Gän- sern- dorf	Holla- brunn	Korneu- burg	Mistel- bach	Voting card	Total votes	%	Seats
Austrian People's Party	ÖVP	15,372	14,016	14,279	18,579	171	62,417	32.95%	2
Social Democratic Party of Austria	SPÖ	19,241	8,110	11,785	12,314	167	51,617	27.25%	1
Freedom Party of Austria	FPÖ	13,300	5,231	8,731	8,801	154	36,217	19.12%	1
The Greens	GRÜNE	4,164	2,131	5,623	3,933	133	15,984	8.44%	0
Team Stronach	FRANK	2,860	1,469	2,200	2,046	28	8,603	4.54%	0
NEOS	NEOS	1,949	1,077	2,691	1,673	62	7,452	3.93%	0
Alliance for the Future of Austria	BZÖ	1,408	673	1,342	1,111	20	4,554	2.40%	0
Pirate Party of Austria	PIRAT	407	215	361	304	9	1,296	0.68%	0
Communist Party of Austria	KPÖ	426	169	341	348	11	1,295	0.68%	0
Valid Votes		59,127	33,091	47,353	49,109	755	189,435	100.00%	4
Rejected Votes		1,091	809	995	1,167	11	4,073	2.10%	
Total Polled		60,218	33,900	48,348	50,276	766	193,508	81.64%	
Registered Electors		75,714	41,153	59,609	60,542		237,018		
Turnout		79.53%	82.38%	81.11%	83.04%		81.64%		

The following candidates were elected:

- Personal mandates - Eva-Maria Himmelbauer (ÖVP), 11,461 votes; Barbara Rosenkranz (FPÖ), 5,458 votes; and Hermann Schultes (ÖVP), 10,138 votes.
- Party mandates - Rudolf Plessl (SPÖ), 5,256 votes.

==== 2000s ====
===== 2008 =====
Results of the 2008 legislative election held on 28 September 2008:

Party		Votes per district					Total votes	%	Seats
Party		Gän- sern- dorf	Holla- brunn	Korneu- burg	Mistel- bach	Voting card	Total votes	%	Seats
Austrian People's Party	ÖVP	16,364	14,269	15,163	19,713	518	66,027	34.29%	2
Social Democratic Party of Austria	SPÖ	21,267	9,254	13,236	13,759	564	58,080	30.17%	2
Freedom Party of Austria	FPÖ	12,754	5,080	8,365	8,785	387	35,371	18.37%	1
The Greens	GRÜNE	3,673	1,992	4,744	3,258	284	13,951	7.25%	0
Alliance for the Future of Austria	BZÖ	3,486	1,652	2,824	2,632	135	10,729	5.57%	0
Liberal Forum	LiF	909	379	1,168	676	52	3,184	1.65%	0
Fritz Dinkhauser List – Citizens' Forum Tyrol	FRITZ	561	344	521	498	35	1,959	1.02%	0
Independent Citizens' Initiative Save Austria	RETTÖ	451	232	369	351	31	1,434	0.74%	0
Communist Party of Austria	KPÖ	376	152	288	253	19	1,088	0.57%	0
The Christians	DC	166	151	166	213	14	710	0.37%	0
Valid Votes		60,007	33,505	46,844	50,138	2,039	192,533	100.00%	5
Rejected Votes		1,180	980	1,108	1,353	22	4,643	2.35%	
Total Polled		61,187	34,485	47,952	51,491	2,061	197,176	84.95%	
Registered Electors		73,548	40,959	57,709	59,904		232,120		
Turnout		83.19%	84.19%	83.09%	85.96%		84.95%		

The following candidates were elected:

- Party mandates - Heribert Donnerbauer (ÖVP), 5,246 votes; Hubert Kuzdas (SPÖ), 3,729 votes; Christian Lausch (FPÖ), 1,734 votes; Rudolf Plessl (SPÖ), 3,838 votes; and Hermann Schultes (ÖVP), 9,433 votes.

Substitutions:

- Heribert Donnerbauer (ÖVP) resigned on 4 July 2012 and was replaced by Eva-Maria Himmelbauer (ÖVP) on 5 July 2012.

===== 2006 =====
Results of the 2006 legislative election held on 1 October 2006:

Party		Votes per district					Total votes	%	Seats
Party		Gän- sern- dorf	Holla- brunn	Korneu- burg	Mistel- bach	Voting card	Total votes	%	Seats
Austrian People's Party	ÖVP	18,976	15,858	16,909	21,976	2,936	76,655	41.24%	2
Social Democratic Party of Austria	SPÖ	23,266	10,238	14,759	15,084	2,301	65,648	35.31%	2
Freedom Party of Austria	FPÖ	6,126	2,580	4,384	4,319	581	17,990	9.68%	0
The Greens	GRÜNE	3,813	1,974	4,704	3,095	1,125	14,711	7.91%	0
Hans-Peter Martin's List	MATIN	1,849	883	1,332	1,410	193	5,667	3.05%	0
Alliance for the Future of Austria	BZÖ	1,354	555	927	929	129	3,894	2.09%	0
Communist Party of Austria	KPÖ	434	201	341	290	65	1,331	0.72%	0
Valid Votes		55,818	32,289	43,356	47,103	7,330	185,896	100.00%	4
Rejected Votes		1,001	733	847	1,105	92	3,778	1.99%	
Total Polled		56,819	33,022	44,203	48,208	7,422	189,674	85.71%	
Registered Electors		69,828	39,455	54,736	57,266		221,285		
Turnout		81.37%	83.70%	80.76%	84.18%		85.71%		

The following candidates were elected:

- Party mandates - Heribert Donnerbauer (ÖVP), 8,614 votes; Hubert Kuzdas (SPÖ), 2,537 votes; Robert Rada (SPÖ), 2,346 votes; and Hermann Schultes (ÖVP), 9,038 votes. (Note: ÖVP: 1st placed candidate Werner Fasslabend was elected in Lower Austria.)

===== 2002 =====
Results of the 2002 legislative election held on 24 November 2002:

Party		Votes per district					Total votes	%	Seats
Party		Gän- sern- dorf	Holla- brunn	Korneu- burg	Mistel- bach	Voting card	Total votes	%	Seats
Austrian People's Party	ÖVP	24,068	18,624	21,040	26,854	2,708	93,294	50.17%	3
Social Democratic Party of Austria	SPÖ	24,053	10,195	15,205	14,866	1,799	66,118	35.55%	2
Freedom Party of Austria	FPÖ	4,155	2,096	3,039	3,050	318	12,658	6.81%	0
The Greens	GRÜNE	3,212	1,558	3,591	2,561	745	11,667	6.27%	0
Liberal Forum	LiF	462	194	431	308	40	1,435	0.77%	0
Communist Party of Austria	KPÖ	298	109	201	169	23	800	0.43%	0
Valid Votes		56,248	32,776	43,507	47,808	5,633	185,972	100.00%	5
Rejected Votes		854	644	716	900	38	3,152	1.67%	
Total Polled		57,102	33,420	44,223	48,708	5,671	189,124	89.42%	
Registered Electors		66,097	38,596	51,517	55,301		211,511		
Turnout		86.39%	86.59%	85.84%	88.08%		89.42%		

The following candidates were elected:

- Party mandates - Heribert Donnerbauer (ÖVP), 3,157 votes; Werner Fasslabend (ÖVP), 5,688 votes; Werner Kummerer (SPÖ), 1,444 votes; Robert Rada (SPÖ), 2,541 votes; and Hermann Schultes (ÖVP), 3,386 votes.

==== 1990s ====
===== 1999 =====
Results of the 1999 legislative election held on 3 October 1999:

Party		Votes per district					Total votes	%	Seats
Party		Gän- sern- dorf	Holla- brunn	Korneu- burg	Mistel- bach	Voting card	Total votes	%	Seats
Austrian People's Party	ÖVP	15,354	14,072	13,174	19,487	1,941	64,028	36.56%	2
Social Democratic Party of Austria	SPÖ	19,825	8,632	12,515	12,678	1,850	55,500	31.69%	2
Freedom Party of Austria	FPÖ	12,560	6,214	9,180	9,504	1,204	38,662	22.07%	1
The Greens	GRÜNE	2,427	1,281	2,706	2,185	538	9,137	5.22%	0
Liberal Forum	LiF	1,260	602	1,386	909	311	4,468	2.55%	0
The Independents	DU	668	354	548	438	48	2,056	1.17%	0
No to NATO and EU – Neutral Austria Citizens' Initiative	NEIN	214	118	178	205	28	743	0.42%	0
Communist Party of Austria	KPÖ	215	94	119	90	30	548	0.31%	0
Valid Votes		52,523	31,367	39,806	45,496	5,950	175,142	100.00%	5
Rejected Votes		927	744	689	981	52	3,393	1.90%	
Total Polled		53,450	32,111	40,495	46,477	6,002	178,535	86.35%	
Registered Electors		64,320	38,178	49,678	54,572		206,748		
Turnout		83.10%	84.11%	81.51%	85.17%		86.35%		

The following candidates were elected:

- Party mandates - Rosemarie Bauer (ÖVP), 2,670 votes; Werner Kummerer (SPÖ), 925 votes; Robert Rada (SPÖ), 1,817 votes; Rudolf Schwarzböck (ÖVP), 3,392 votes; and Robert Wenitsch (FPÖ), 1,684 votes.

Substitutions:

- Rudolf Schwarzböck (ÖVP) resigned on 18 September 2000 and was replaced by Hermann Schultes (ÖVP) on 19 September 2000.
- Rosemarie Bauer (ÖVP) resigned on 30 June 2001 and was replaced by Heribert Donnerbauer (ÖVP) on 2 July 2001.

===== 1995 =====
Results of the 1995 legislative election held on 17 December 1995:

Party		Votes per district					Total votes	%	Seats
Party		Gän- sern- dorf	Holla- brunn	Korneu- burg	Mistel- bach	Voting card	Total votes	%	Seats
Austrian People's Party	ÖVP	16,760	14,602	14,344	20,850	1,552	68,108	38.40%	2
Social Democratic Party of Austria	SPÖ	22,933	10,113	14,290	15,023	1,322	63,681	35.91%	2
Freedom Party of Austria	FPÖ	9,300	5,047	7,106	7,225	708	29,386	16.57%	1
Liberal Forum	LiF	2,450	1,136	2,331	1,594	389	7,900	4.45%	0
The Greens	GRÜNE	1,563	833	1,610	1,493	343	5,842	3.29%	0
No – Civic Action Group; Against the Sale of Austria	NEIN	627	329	458	607	40	2,061	1.16%	0
Communist Party of Austria	KPÖ	173	54	85	59	7	378	0.21%	0
Valid Votes		53,806	32,114	40,224	46,851	4,361	177,356	100.00%	5
Rejected Votes		1,257	819	885	1,152	40	4,153	2.29%	
Total Polled		55,063	32,933	41,109	48,003	4,401	181,509	89.61%	
Registered Electors		62,639	37,933	47,818	54,155		202,545		
Turnout		87.91%	86.82%	85.97%	88.64%		89.61%		

The following candidates were elected:

- Party mandates - Rosemarie Bauer (ÖVP), 2,066 votes; Werner Kummerer (SPÖ), 1,098 votes; Robert Rada (SPÖ), 1,864 votes; Rudolf Schwarzböck (ÖVP), 3,084 votes; and Robert Wenitsch (FPÖ), 861 votes.

===== 1994 =====
Results of the 1994 legislative election held on 9 October 1994:

Party		Votes per district					Total votes	%	Seats
Party		Gän- sern- dorf	Holla- brunn	Korneu- burg	Mistel- bach	Voting card	Total votes	%	Seats
Austrian People's Party	ÖVP	15,678	14,126	12,971	20,309	1,588	64,672	37.94%	2
Social Democratic Party of Austria	SPÖ	20,009	8,767	11,940	12,938	1,278	54,932	32.23%	2
Freedom Party of Austria	FPÖ	10,034	5,296	7,225	7,646	968	31,169	18.29%	1
Liberal Forum	LiF	2,628	1,312	2,606	1,857	356	8,759	5.14%	0
The Greens	GRÜNE	2,410	1,251	2,583	1,995	452	8,691	5.10%	0
No – Civic Action Group; Against the Sale of Austria	NEIN	507	300	352	438	36	1,633	0.96%	0
Communist Party of Austria	KPÖ	141	45	72	54	5	317	0.19%	0
United Greens Austria – List Adi Pinter	VGÖ	43	23	41	39	6	152	0.09%	0
Citizen Greens Austria – Free Democrats	BGÖ	33	22	26	39	3	123	0.07%	0
Valid Votes		51,483	31,142	37,816	45,315	4,692	170,448	100.00%	5
Rejected Votes		1,065	1,018	872	1,201	48	4,204	2.41%	
Total Polled		52,548	32,160	38,688	46,516	4,740	174,652	86.52%	
Registered Electors		62,422	37,846	47,464	54,142		201,874		
Turnout		84.18%	84.98%	81.51%	85.91%		86.52%		

The following candidates were elected:

- Party mandates - Rosemarie Bauer (ÖVP), 3,855 votes; Werner Kummerer (SPÖ), 1,093 votes; Robert Rada (SPÖ), 2,477 votes; Rudolf Schwarzböck (ÖVP), 4,357 votes; and Robert Wenitsch (FPÖ), 1,277 votes.
