= Andreas Minnich =

Austrian politician (born 1974)

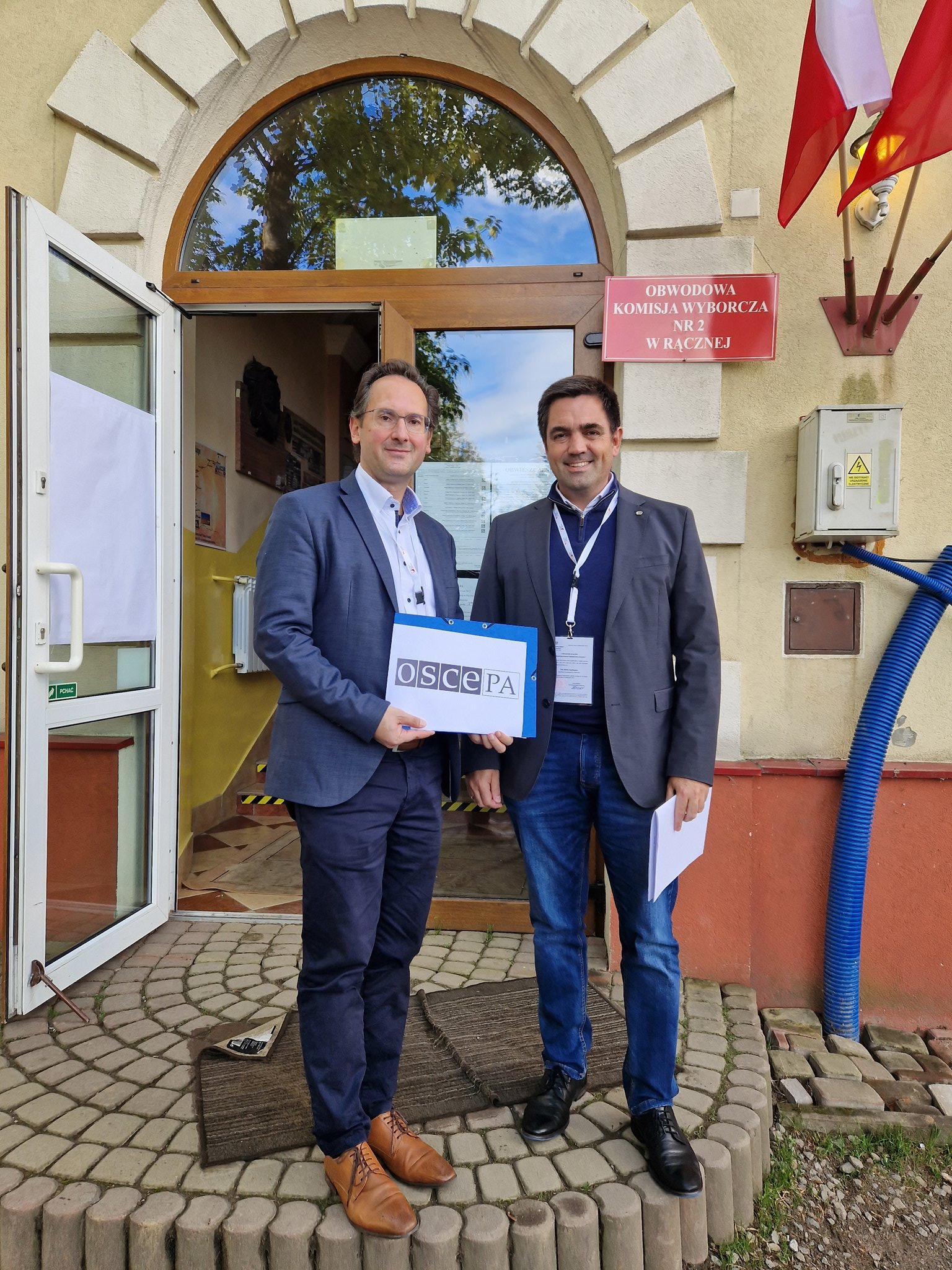
- Minnich in 2023

Member of the National Council
- Incumbent
- Assumed office 23 October 2019
- Constituency: Weinviertel

Personal details
- Born: 2 October 1974 (age 51)
- Party: People's Party

Andreas Minnich (born 2 October 1974) is an Austrian politician of the People's Party who has served as a member of the National Council since 2019. He has been a municipal councillor of Korneuburg since 2006.
