= Lower Austria East (National Council electoral district) =

Parliamentary electoral district in Austria

- Niederösterreich Ost
- Electoral District for the National Council
- Location of Lower Austria East within Austria
- District: List: Bruck an der Leitha; Gänserndorf
- State: Lower Austria
- Population: 218,152 (2024)
- Electorate: 151,346 (2019)
- Area: 1,975 km^{2} (2023)

Current Electoral District
- Created: 2017
- Seats: 4 (2017–present)
- Members: List: Angela Baumgartner (ÖVP); Katharina Kucharowits (SPÖ)
- Created from: List: Lower Austria South East; Weinviertel

Lower Austria East (German: Niederösterreich Ost), also known as Electoral District 3G (German: Wahlkreis 3G), is one of the 39 multi-member regional electoral districts of the National Council, the lower house of the Austrian Parliament, the national legislature of Austria. The electoral district was established in 2016 from parts of Lower Austria South East and Weinviertel following the re-organisation of the regional electoral districts in Lower Austria to reflect the new administrative district structure and came into being at the following legislative election in 2017. It consists of the districts of Bruck an der Leitha and Gänserndorf in the state of Lower Austria. The electoral district currently elects four of the 183 members of the National Council using the open party-list proportional representation electoral system. At the 2019 legislative election the constituency had 151,346 registered electors.

== History ==
Lower Austria East was established in 2016 from parts of Lower Austria South East and Weinviertel following the re-organisation of the regional electoral districts in Lower Austria to reflect the new administrative district structure. It consisted of the districts of Bruck an der Leitha and Gänserndorf in the state of Lower Austria. The district was initially allocated four seats in February 2017.

== Electoral system ==
Lower Austria East currently elects four of the 183 members of the National Council using the open party-list proportional representation electoral system. The allocation of seats is carried out in three stages. In the first stage, seats are allocated to parties (lists) at the regional level using a state-wide Hare quota (wahlzahl) (valid votes in the state divided by the number of seats in the state). In the second stage, seats are allocated to parties at the state/provincial level using the state-wide Hare quota (any seats won by the party at the regional stage are subtracted from the party's state seats). In the third and final stage, seats are allocated to parties at the federal/national level using the D'Hondt method (any seats won by the party at the regional and state stages are subtracted from the party's federal seats). Only parties that reach the 4% national threshold, or have won a seat at the regional stage, compete for seats at the state and federal stages.

Electors may cast one preferential vote for individual candidates at the regional, state and federal levels. Split-ticket voting (panachage), or voting for more than one candidate at each level, is not permitted and will result in the ballot paper being invalidated. At the regional level, candidates must receive preferential votes amounting to at least 14% of the valid votes cast for their party to over-ride the order of the party list (10% and 7% respectively for the state and federal levels).

== Election results ==
=== Summary ===
| Election | Communists KPÖ+ / KPÖ | | | Social Democrats SPÖ | | | Greens GRÜNE | | | NEOS NEOS / LiF | | | People's ÖVP | | | Freedom FPÖ | | |
| Election | Votes | % | Seats | Votes | % | Seats | Votes | % | Seats | Votes | % | Seats | Votes | % | Seats | Votes | % | Seats |
|---|---|---|---|---|---|---|---|---|---|---|---|---|---|---|---|---|---|---|
| 2019 | 630 | 0.54% | 0 | 27,942 | 23.94% | 1 | 10,542 | 9.03% | 0 | 7,593 | 6.51% | 0 | 45,141 | 38.68% | 1 | 22,201 | 19.02% | 0 |
| 2017 | 612 | 0.49% | 0 | 34,684 | 28.03% | 1 | 2,564 | 2.07% | 0 | 4,416 | 3.57% | 0 | 37,688 | 30.46% | 1 | 37,360 | 30.20% | 1 |

=== Detailed ===
==== 2019 ====
Results of the 2019 legislative election held on 29 September 2019:

| Party | | Votes per district | | | Total votes | % | Seats |
| Party | | Bruck an der Leitha | Gän- sern- dorf | Voting card | Total votes | % | Seats |
|---|---|---|---|---|---|---|---|
| Austrian People's Party | ÖVP | 20,492 | 24,484 | 165 | 45,141 | 38.68% | 1 |
| Social Democratic Party of Austria | SPÖ | 13,728 | 14,099 | 115 | 27,942 | 23.94% | 1 |
| Freedom Party of Austria | FPÖ | 10,395 | 11,679 | 127 | 22,201 | 19.02% | 0 |
| The Greens | GRÜNE | 5,621 | 4,821 | 100 | 10,542 | 9.03% | 0 |
| NEOS – The New Austria and Liberal Forum | NEOS | 3,837 | 3,700 | 56 | 7,593 | 6.51% | 0 |
| JETZT | JETZT | 1,069 | 1,049 | 26 | 2,144 | 1.84% | 0 |
| KPÖ Plus | KPÖ+ | 310 | 315 | 5 | 630 | 0.54% | 0 |
| Der Wandel | WANDL | 261 | 256 | 2 | 519 | 0.44% | 0 |
| Valid Votes | | 55,713 | 60,403 | 596 | 116,712 | 100.00% | 2 |
| Rejected Votes | | 747 | 761 | 7 | 1,515 | 1.28% | |
| Total Polled | | 56,460 | 61,164 | 603 | 118,227 | 78.12% | |
| Registered Electors | | 72,905 | 78,441 | | 151,346 | | |
| Turnout | | 77.44% | 77.97% | | 78.12% | | |

The following candidates were elected:

- Party mandates - Angela Baumgartner (ÖVP), 3,494 votes; and Katharina Kucharowits (SPÖ), 2,041 votes.

==== 2017 ====
Results of the 2017 legislative election held on 15 October 2017:

| Party | | Votes per district | | | Total votes | % | Seats |
| Party | | Bruck an der Leitha | Gän- sern- dorf | Voting card | Total votes | % | Seats |
|---|---|---|---|---|---|---|---|
| Austrian People's Party | ÖVP | 16,864 | 20,651 | 173 | 37,688 | 30.46% | 1 |
| Freedom Party of Austria | FPÖ | 17,759 | 19,415 | 186 | 37,360 | 30.20% | 1 |
| Social Democratic Party of Austria | SPÖ | 17,641 | 16,861 | 182 | 34,684 | 28.03% | 1 |
| Peter Pilz List | PILZ | 2,456 | 2,400 | 3 | 4,859 | 3.93% | 0 |
| NEOS – The New Austria and Liberal Forum | NEOS | 2,199 | 2,151 | 66 | 4,416 | 3.57% | 0 |
| The Greens | GRÜNE | 1,283 | 1,248 | 33 | 2,564 | 2.07% | 0 |
| My Vote Counts! | GILT | 572 | 562 | 53 | 1,187 | 0.96% | 0 |
| Communist Party of Austria | KPÖ | 331 | 281 | 0 | 612 | 0.49% | 0 |
| The Whites | WEIßE | 101 | 89 | 14 | 204 | 0.16% | 0 |
| Free List Austria | FLÖ | 70 | 75 | 4 | 149 | 0.12% | 0 |
| Valid Votes | | 59,276 | 63,733 | 714 | 123,723 | 100.00% | 3 |
| Rejected Votes | | 586 | 625 | 5 | 1,216 | 0.97% | |
| Total Polled | | 59,862 | 64,358 | 719 | 124,939 | 83.56% | |
| Registered Electors | | 72,142 | 77,376 | | 149,518 | | |
| Turnout | | 82.98% | 83.18% | | 83.56% | | |

The following candidates were elected:

- Party mandates - Angela Baumgartner (ÖVP), 4,902 votes; Werner Herbert (FPÖ), 2,416 votes; and Rudolf Plessl (SPÖ), 2,398 votes.
