= Angela Baumgartner =

Austrian politician (born 1969)

Member of the National Council
- Incumbent
- Assumed office 9 November 2017
- Constituency: Lower Austria East

Personal details
- Born: 20 May 1969 (age 56)
- Party: People's Party

Angela Baumgartner (born 20 May 1969) is an Austrian politician of the People's Party serving as a member of the National Council since 2017. She has served as mayor of Sulz im Weinviertel since 2014.
