= Novo-Peredelkino Church =

Church of the Holy Igor of Chernigov
- Церковь Святого Игоря Черниговского
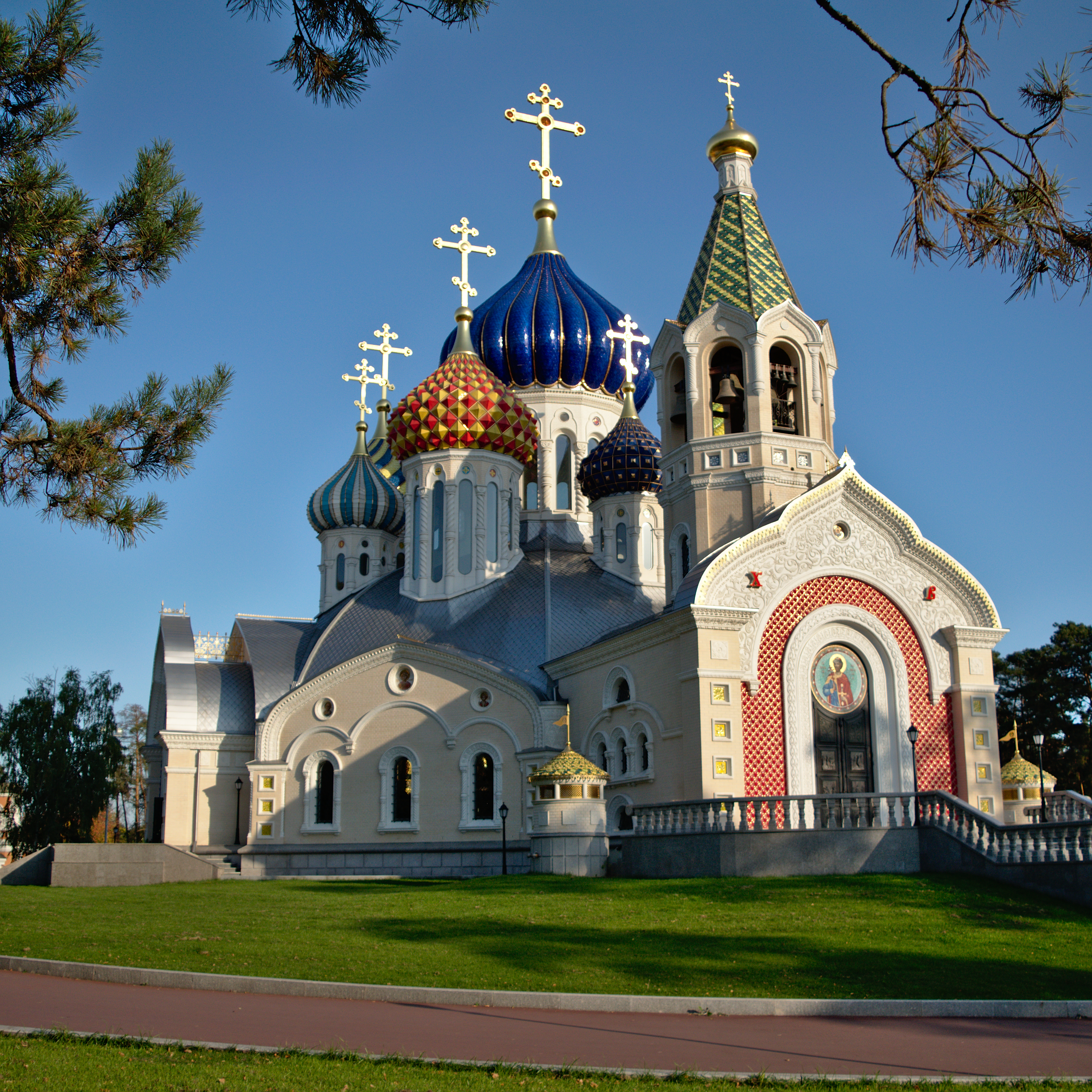
- Church of the Holy Igor of Chernigov
- 55°39′24″N 37°20′53″E
- Location: Moscow
- Country: Russia
- Denomination: Russian Orthodox
- Website: spas-pr.ru

History
- Consecrated: 17 June 2012

Architecture
- Style: Russian architecture
- Groundbreaking: 20 January 2010
- Completed: 2012

The Church of St. Igor of Chernigov (Russian: Церковь Святого Игоря Черниговского) is a Russian Orthodox church in the Novo-Peredelkino District of the Western Administrative Okrug in Moscow. It is dedicated to St. Igor of Chernigov and Kiev. It is located near the summer residence of the Patriarch of Moscow and All Russia in Novo-Peredelkino.

The idea of building a large church next to the Patriarch's residence belonged to Patriarch Alexy II. In 2005, he approved the project and approved the decision to consecrate a temple in honor of St. Grand Prince Igor of Chernigov and Kiev. Patriarch Alexy pointed out the place and blessed the start of construction of the temple, which is in the same year launched by a Closed Joint Stock Company 'Baltic Construction Company'. The building was designed by Alexandr Shipkov.

On January 20, 2010, Patriarch Kirill performed the rite of consecration of the foundation stone in the foundation of the temple of the Holy Prince Igor of Chernigov. On March 4, 2011, Patriarch Kirill of blessed the crosses and the bells of the church under construction. On June 17, 2012, Patriarch Kirill performed the rite of the great consecration of the cathedral church and served the first Divine Liturgy in the church.

The church is designed for 1,200 people. The domes have bright colors and patterns harking back to Saint Basil's Cathedral. The church is included in the Mikhailovsky deanery of the Moscow Diocese.
