= Junge Generation (SPÖ) =

Austrian youth organisation

Young Generation Junge Generation (JG)
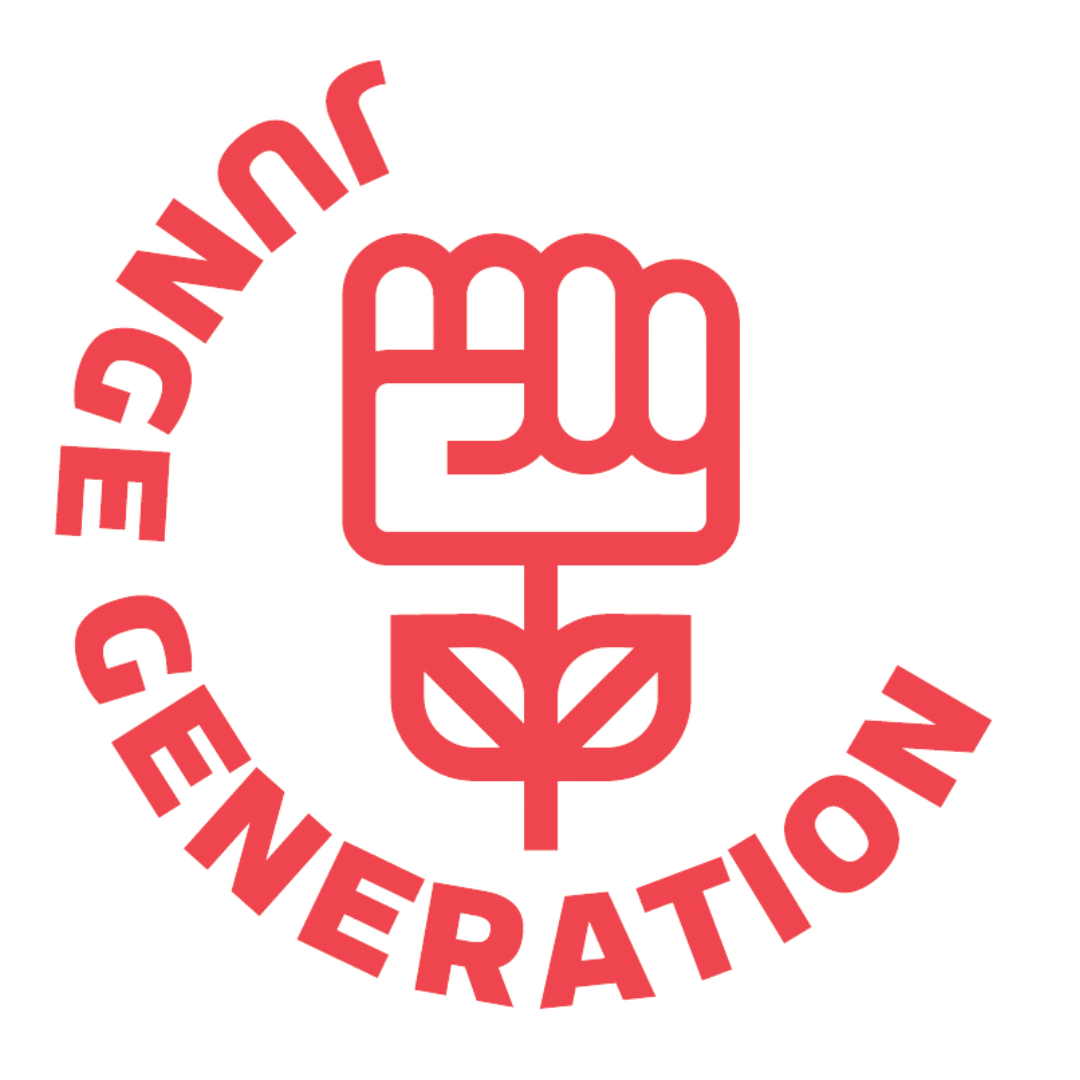
- Chairperson: Michael Kögl
- Founded: 22 January 1958; 67 years ago
- Headquarters: Löwelstraße 18, A-1010; Vienna, Austria
- Ideology: Social democracy Anti-fascism; Feminism; Internationalism; Pro-Europeanism
- Mother party: Social Democratic Party of Austria (SPÖ)
- Website: jg.spoe.at

The Young Generation (German: Junge Generation, JG) within the Social Democratic Party of Austria (SPÖ) is one of its three departments, alongside Education and Women. Acting as the political voice for SPÖ members aged 18 to 38, every individual within that age range is automatically considered a member of the JG.

== History ==
The Junge Generation (JG) first became active in 1956 and was later officially established on January 22, 1958, to better represent the interests of young people within the SPÖ. The founding of the JG was a direct response to the disappointing results of the SPÖ in the 1956 national elections, particularly among young voters, as well as to the increasingly strained relationship with the Sozialistische Jugend Österreich (SJÖ). The SJÖ had always been an independent youth organization, both politically and organizationally, which regularly led to tensions with the SPÖ.

Initially, the JG was created to serve as a bridge between the SJÖ and the SPÖ, aiming to establish a closer connection between young people and the party. Over time, however, the JG evolved into a more autonomous structure that was more closely aligned with the SPÖ's party line, representing the concerns of young people within the SPÖ as an internal organization.

At the party congress in 1963, the "Arbeitsgemeinschaft Junge Generation" was officially integrated as a department within the SPÖ. From the beginning, the JG focused on issues such as social justice, redistribution, and participation. Housing was also a significant concern, leading to the establishment of a housing association in the 1960s to support young people in starting their independent lives. Throughout its history, the JG has consistently advocated for improving the living conditions of young people and giving them a strong voice within the SPÖ.

Today, the JG is defined in the party statutes of the SPÖ as: "The 'Young Generation' (JG) is a working group in which young people act according to social democratic principles and in cooperation with the relevant party organizations".

On October 16, 1958, the first executive board was elected, with Bertl Rauscher serving as chairperson. Following the approval of the "Working Guidelines of the JG as a Department of the Party" by the Federal Party Executive in 1962 and the subsequent endorsement of a new statute, the association underwent a corresponding transformation. In 1963, the JG established an office in the premises of the Vienna Stadthalle, solidifying its position as a department within the SPÖ.

In the 1980s, calls from JG women for greater representation in the Youth Generation's committees led to discussions about possible structural reforms addressing this aspect. It was decided that in all JG committees, at least 30 percent of the delegates must be women. In 1984, Maria Berger became the first female federal chairperson of the JG, succeeded by Christian Cap in 1987. During these years, key issues included the presidential election campaign, during which the JG released a wall newspaper titled "The Waldheim Truth" and campaigned for Kurt Steyrer. Additionally, demands for tax reform, increased environmental protection competencies, and a reform of apprenticeship training were among the substantive priorities.

In the 1990s, the theme of "Integration and Coexistence" gained prominence. When Jörg Haider (FPÖ) addressed the "Austria First" referendum in 1993, the JG, in cooperation with SOS Mitmensch, opposed it. Nationwide, various materials were produced with the slogan "People in Need - Help Instead of Haider - No Referendum Against Human Rights", and a dedicated hotline was established.

In 1996, the JG lost its federal secretariat, its most important structure up to that point. Nonetheless, the JG managed to launch its "Man Is Not a Commodity" project and sell "jobless" individuals throughout Austria. After several years of intensive negotiations, an independent federal secretariat was re-established in 1998. In addition to campaign work, the Young Generation was also involved in the revision of the SPÖ basic program in 2000.

In the early 2000s, the focus was on "Work-Life Balance," the European Union, and the commemorative year "1945-2005". The introduction of tuition fees in 2002 was vehemently criticized by the JG, which also joined numerous protests against them. In the same year, a brochure on the topic of non-marital partnerships was printed, which remained popular for years. Key thematic areas included "Work-Life Balance" and the "European Union". In 2005, the focus was on the commemorative year "1945-2005". In collaboration with the Vienna AK (Chamber for Workers and Employees), the JG produced a traveling exhibition.

In November 2008, the 50th anniversary of the JG was celebrated.

== Tasks ==
The tasks of the JG are also regulated in the SPÖ statute and primarily involve familiarizing young people with politics and social democratic principles, representing their interests, and providing them with opportunities for active participation and engagement.

The JG has set thematic priorities for itself and implements them through working groups and committees.

Working Groups Currently, there are five permanent working groups:

- Europe
- Women
- Fundamental work
- Integration
- International Affairs

These working groups meet regularly to develop campaigns or positions on their respective topics.

== Structure ==
The Young Generation is divided into eight state groups, which are further divided into district and local working groups. The leadership is led by a federal chairman together with the federal board. Each state organization has its own chairman (and board), as do the district and local groups.

Federal Board The federal board and its leadership are elected every two years by delegates from the various states. During the 60th anniversary in 2018, Vienna district politician Claudia O'Brien was elected as the federal chairwoman of the Young Generation.

== JG Chairperson ==
- Hans Czettel (1958)
- Fritz Hofmann (1958)
- Bertl Rauscher (1958)
- Hans Czettel (1961–1963)
- Fritz Hofmann (1963–1967)
- Leopold Gratz (1967–1971)
- Karl Blecha (1971–1974)
- Albrecht K. Konecny (1974–1980)
- Fritz Edlinger (1980–1984)
- Maria Berger (1984–1988)
- Christian Cap (1988–1991)
- Hans Marcher (1991–1994)
- Franz Ramskogler (1994–1996)
- Erich Fenninger (1996–1997)
- Jörg Paller (1997–1998)
- Michael Grossmann (1998–2002)
- Jörg Leichtfried (2000–2002)
- Kerstin Suchan (2002–2003)
- Johannes Schwarz (2003–2004)
- Alexander Prischl (2004–2008)
- Tina Tauß (2008–2012)
- Katharina Kucharowits (2012–2018)
- Claudia O’Brien (2018–2022)
- Michael Kögl (2022-Present)

State Organizations and Their Chairpersons

Carinthia: Luca Burgstaller*

Lower Austria: Valentin Mähner

Upper Austria: Michael Mollner

Salzburg: Tobias Aigner*

Styria: Julian Stadler

Tyrol: Johannes Reinstadler

Vorarlberg: Elias Wehinger

Vienna: Alexander Ackerl

*In these states, the Socialist Youth and the Young Generation are merged.

== Secretariat ==
Similar to the organizational structure of the SPÖ, the JG also has organizational secretariats (1 federal secretariat, 6 state secretariats). These manage the affairs of the federal JG or the individual state organizations. The Managing Federal Secretary is Julian Krismer.

== Former Prominent JG Members ==
Several prominent politicians have a background in the JG, including:

Maria Berger - Former Minister of Justice and former Federal Chairwoman of the JG

Karl Blecha - Former Minister of the Interior and former President of the Austrian Pensioners' Association

Michael Häupl - Mayor of the City of Vienna

Harry Kopietz - President of the Vienna State Parliament and "founder" of the Donauinselfest

Andrea Kuntzl - Member of the National Council and leading candidate for Vienna in 2006

Jörg Leichtfried - Former Minister of Transport, Innovation and Technology

Gisela Wurm - Member of the National Council and former Chairwoman of the SPÖ Women's Association in Tyrol
