= Katharina Kucharowits =

Austrian politician (born 1983)

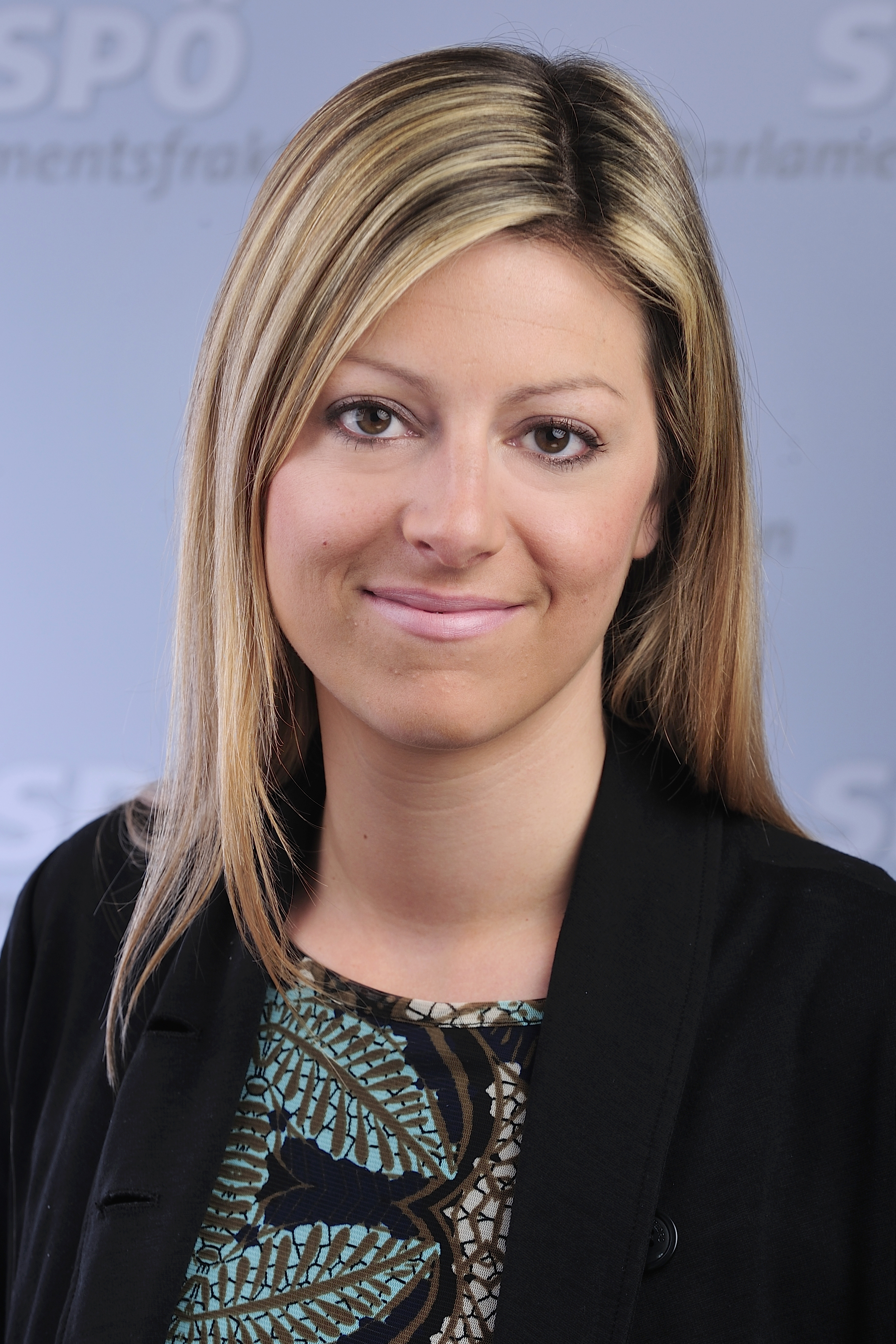
- Kucharowits in April 2014

Member of the National Council
- Incumbent
- Assumed office 23 October 2019
- Constituency: Lower Austria East
- In office 16 November 2018 – 22 October 2019
- Preceded by: Christian Kern
- Constituency: Federal List
- In office 29 October 2013 – 8 November 2017
- Constituency: Federal List

Personal details
- Born: 19 September 1983 (age 43) Mödling, Austria
- Party: Social Democratic Party
- Education: University of Vienna

Katharina Kucharowits (born 19 September 1983) is an Austrian politician and member of the National Council. A member of the Social Democratic Party, she has represented Lower Austria East since October 2019. She was a Federal List member of the National Council from October 2013 to November 2017 and from November 2018 to October 2019.

Kucharowits was born on 19 September 1983 in Mödling. She studied for a political science degree as well as a teaching degree in mathematics and psychology/philosophy at the University of Vienna. She was a parliamentary employee from 2006 to 2012 before taking a leave of absence to study between 2012 and 2013. She worked briefly for the Social Democratic Party (SPÖ) in 2013 and for the Government of Lower Austria in 2018.

Kucharowits has held various positions in the Schwechat, Bruck an der Leitha District and Lower Austrian branches of the SPÖ and its youth wing Young Generation since 2007. She was a member of the municipal council in Schwechat from April 2010 to August 2012. She was elected to the National Council at the 2013 legislative election. She was not re-elected at the 2017 legislative election but she was appointed to the National Council in November 2018 following the resignation of Christian Kern.

Electoral history of Katharina Kucharowits
Election	Electoral district	Party	Votes	%	Result
2013 legislative	Greater Vienna	Social Democratic Party	605	1.70%	Not elected
2013 legislative	Lower Austria	Social Democratic Party	84	0.03%	Not elected
2013 legislative	Federal List	Social Democratic Party	531	0.04%	Elected
2017 legislative	Lower Austria	Social Democratic Party	196	0.07%	Not elected
2017 legislative	Federal List	Social Democratic Party	746	0.05%	Not elected
2019 legislative	Lower Austria East	Social Democratic Party	2,041	7.30%	Elected
2019 legislative	Lower Austria	Social Democratic Party	192	0.09%	Not elected
