= Francisca Cualladó Baixauli =

Spanish Catholic seamstress

- Born: December 3, 1890, Valencia, Spain
- Died: September 19, 1936 (aged 45), Benifaió, Spain
- Means of martyrdom: Firing squad
- Beatified: March 11, 2001, by John Paul II
- Feast: September 19

Francisca Cualladó Baixauli (December 3, 1890 - September 19, 1936) was a Spanish Catholic seamstress born in Molino de San Isidro, ward of Ruzafa, Valencia, who was executed by firing squad at the Torre Espioca of Benifaió in 1936, during the Spanish Civil War. She was considered a martyr by the Catholic Church, and beatified by Pope John Paul II on 11 March 2001. Her feast day is celebrated on September 19.
