= Trophimus, Sabbatius, and Dorymedon =

3rd-century Christian martyrs

Saint Trophimus, Dorymedon, and Sabbatius
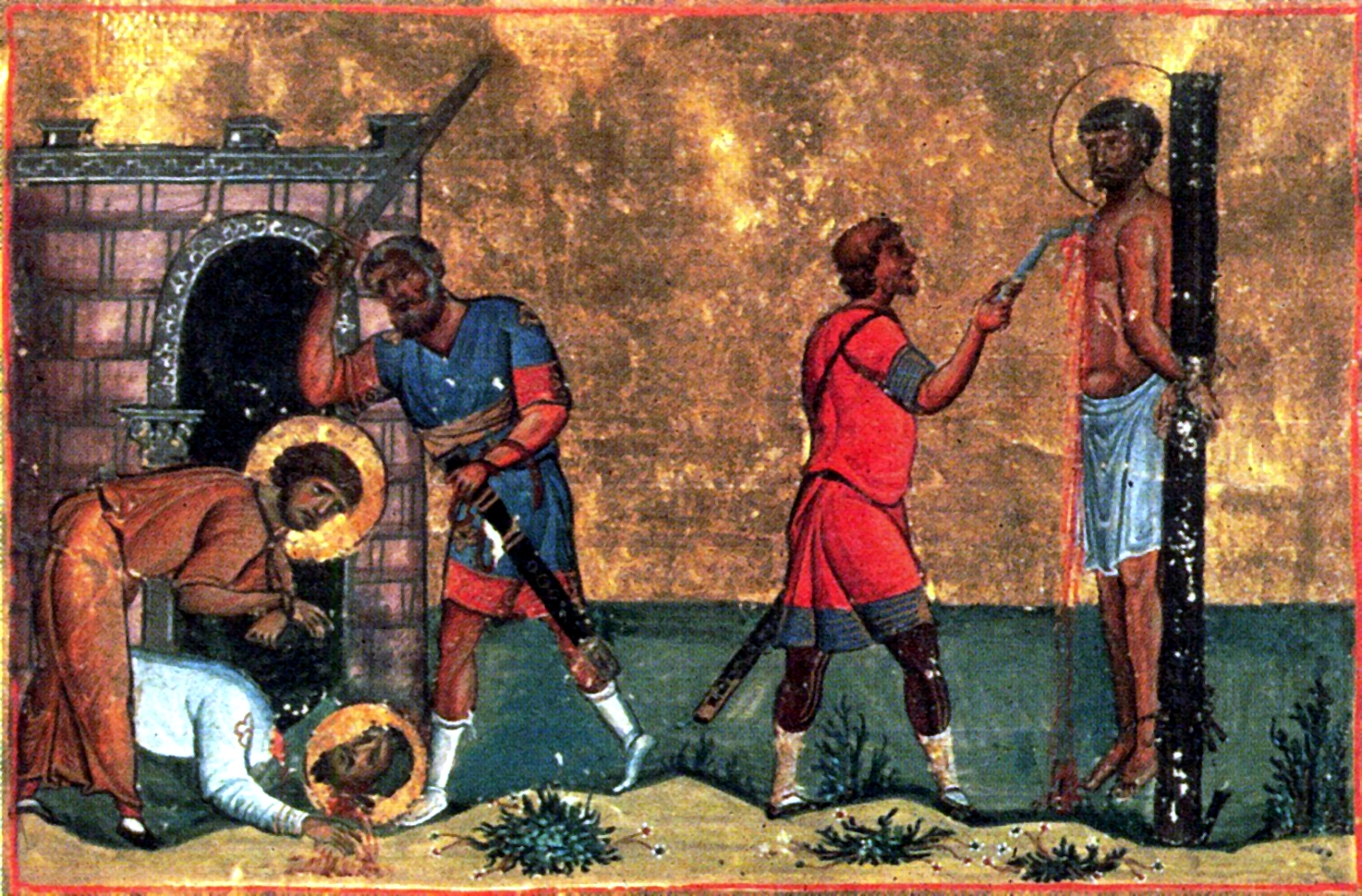
- Martyrdom of Sts. Trophimos, Sabbatios, and Dorymedon. From the Menologion of Basil II.

Martyrs
- Died: ~278 AD; Antioch (Sabbatius); Synnada (Dorymedon and Trophimus) (modern-day Antakya, Hatay and Şuhut, Afyonkarahisar, Turkey)
- Feast: September 19 (Roman Catholic Church); September 19 (Eastern Orthodox liturgics)

Saints Trophimus (Trophimos), Sabbatius (Sabbatios, Sabbaticus), and Dorymedon are venerated as Christian martyrs. The story of their martyrdom is enshrouded in myth, and though they share the same feast day, the saints were not martyred together or at the same time.

According to their Passion, Emperor Probus decreed that all Christians should sacrifice to the Roman gods. The Emperor sent two officials, Trophimus and Sabbatius, to Antioch. However, after Trophimus and Sabbatius arrived at the city, they were so shocked by the tortures inflicted upon the Christians there that the two men converted to Christianity. Trophimus and Sabbatius were arrested and tortured; Sabbatius died as a result of being tortured.

Trophimus was sent to Synnada in Asia Minor. Imprisoned at Synnada was a Christian senator named Dorymedon, and Trophimus visited the senator in prison. Officials in Synnada attempted to force Dorymedon and Trophimus to sacrifice to the gods Castor and Pollux. Dorymedon and Trophimus refused and were tortured and sentenced to be thrown to wild beasts in the arena. According to their Passion, the beasts refused to harm the two saints. The saints were then decapitated.

A reliquary in the form of a sarcophagus containing some of the bones of Trophimus was discovered at Schifout Kassaba (Synnada) in 1907, and transported to the museum at Bursa; this monument may date back to the third century.
