= Synnada =

Ancient town in Phrygia Prima Salutaris, in modern Turkey

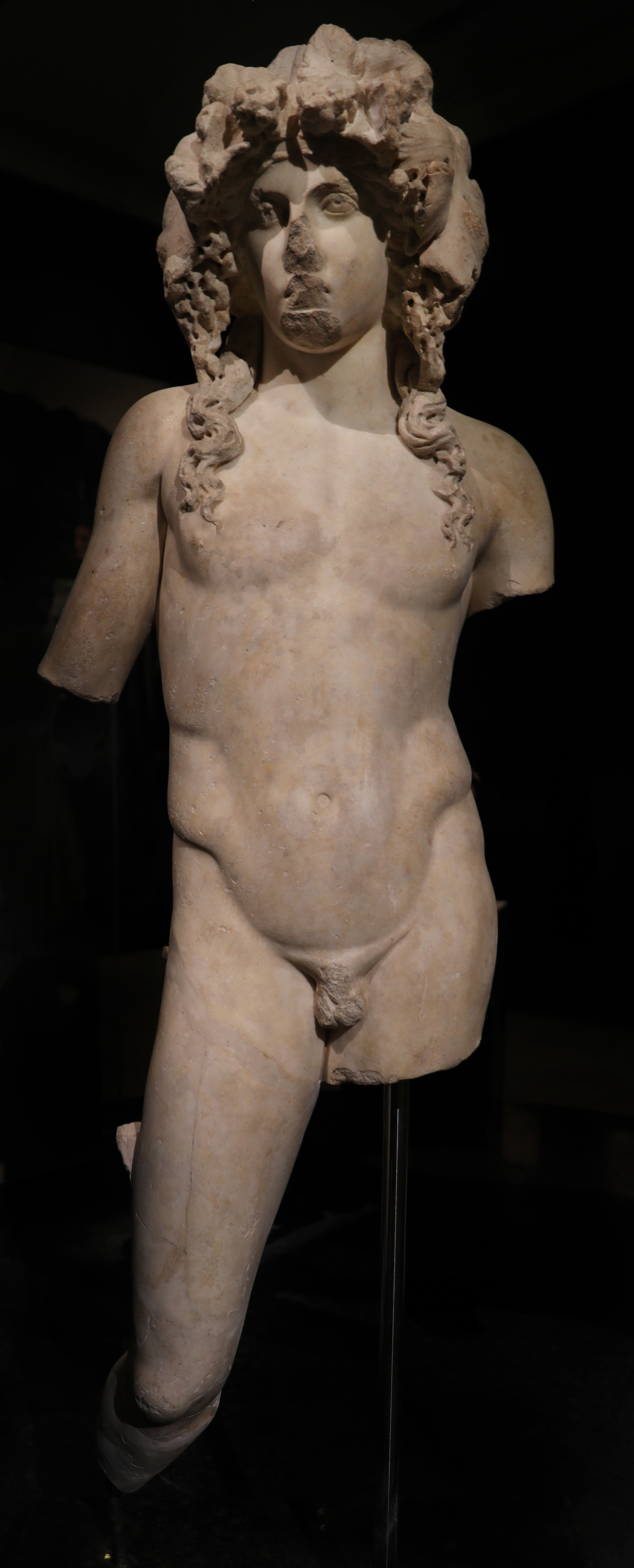
- 1st/2nd century AD Roman statue of Dionysus from Synnada

- Location within Turkey
- 38°32′N 30°33′E

Synnada (Greek: Σύνναδα) was an ancient town of Phrygia Salutaris in Asia Minor. Its site is now occupied by the modern Turkish town of Şuhut, in Afyonkarahisar Province.

== Situation ==
Synnada was situated in the south-eastern part of eastern Phrygia, or Parorea, thus named because it extended to the foot of the mountains of Pisidia, at the extremity of a plain about 60 stadia in length, and covered with opium plantations.

== History ==
Synnada is said to have been founded by Acamas who went to Phrygia after the Trojan War and took some Macedonian colonists.

=== Classical Age ===
It enters written history when the Roman consul Gnaeus Manlius Vulso passed through that city on his expeditions against the Galatians (189 BCE). It was assigned to the kingdom of the Attalids and when that kingdom passed to Rome in 133 BC, it became part of the province of Asia, except on two occasions during the last century of the Roman Republic when it was temporarily attached to Cilicia. In Strabo's time it was still a small town, but when Pliny wrote it was an important place, being the conventus juridicus for the whole of the surrounding country. Cicero mentions that he passed through Synnada on his way from Ephesus to Cilicia. The city was celebrated throughout the Roman Empire on account of the trade in a beautiful kind of marble, which came from nearby quarries and was commonly called Synnadic marble, though it came properly from a place in the neighborhood, Docimia, whence it was more correctly called Docimites lapis. This marble was of a light color, interspersed with purple spots and veins. On its coins, which disappear after the reign of Gallienus, its inhabitants call themselves Dorians and Ionians. Under Diocletian at the time of the creation of Phrygia Pacatiana, Synnada, at the intersection of two great roads, became the metropolis (capital). Under Ottoman rule it became the city of Schifout Kassaba in the vilayet of Bursa.

== Ecclesiastical history ==
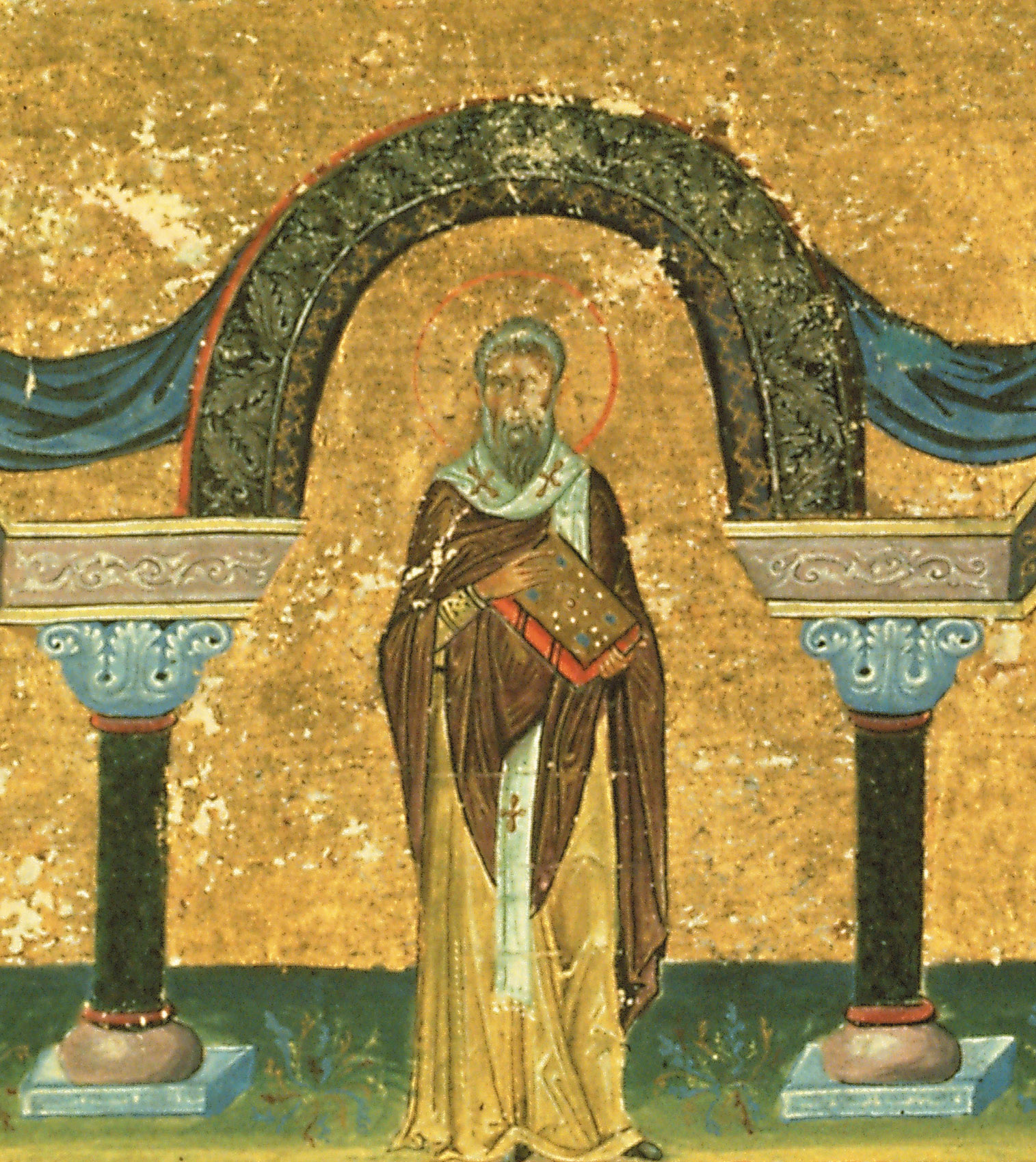
Agapitus the Confessor

Christianity was introduced at an early date into Synnada. The Martyrologium Hieronymianum mentions the martyrs Trophimus and Dorymedon. A reliquary of Tromphimus in the form of a sarcophagus with his bones was discovered here and transported to the Bursa museum; it may date to the 3rd century. Eusebius of Caesarea speaks of its pious bishop Atticus who entrusted to the layman Theodore the duty of instructing the Christians.

About 230-235 a council on the rebaptizing of heretics was held there. St. Agapitus, mentioned in the Roman Martyrology on 24 March as Bishop of Synnada, belonged to Synaus.

For a list of other bishops see Le Quien, Oriens christianus, I, 827. Mention must be made of:

- Procopius (321); Cyriacus, friend of St. John Chrysostom
- Theodosius and his competitor Agapetus, at first a Macedonian heretic
- Severus (431) Attended Council of Ephesus
- Marinianus (448-51)
- Theogenes (536)
- Severus (553)
- St. Pausicacus, during the reign of Emperor Maurice, honoured by the Greek Church on 13 May
- Cosmas, 680
- John, adversary of the iconoclasts in the time of Patriarch St. Germanus
- St. Michael, honoured by the Latin and Greek churches 23 May, died 23 May, 826, in exile for his zeal in defending the worship of images
- Peter under Patriarch Photius
- John under Photius
- Pantaleon under Leo the Wise
- Leo under Basil II
- Nicetas in 1082
- Georgios at the Council of St. Sophia, about 1450, if one can believe the apocryphal Acts of this council, which perhaps never occurred.

The last Bishop of Synnada spoken of in the documents, without mentioning his name, probably lived under John Cantacuzenus (see "Cantacuz. Hist.", III, 73) and probably never lived at Synnada on account of the Turkish conquest.

Saint Constantine, a converted Jew of Synnada, lived in the 10th century; he became a monk, and is honoured by the Greek Church 26 December.

In 1370, the see was assumed by the metropolitanate of Kotyaion, in 1385 by the metropolitanate of Philadelphia, and in 1394 by Philadelphia again.

The metropolitan see of Synnada continues to be included in the list of titular sees recognized by the Roman Catholic Church. In 1963, it was assigned to Marcel-François Lefebvre, who later became a traditionalist Catholic founding the Society of St. Pius X to preserve the Latin Mass. Since the Second Vatican Council no new appointments have been made to this eastern titular see.
