= Christian Lausch =

Austrian politician (born 1969)

Member of the National Council
- Incumbent
- Assumed office 28 October 2008
- Constituency: 3 Niederösterreich

Personal details
- Born: 2 December 1969 (age 56)
- Party: Freedom Party of Austria

Christian Lausch (born 2 December 1969) is an Austrian politician who has been a Member of the National Council for the Freedom Party of Austria (FPÖ) since 2008.
