= Earl R. Fox =

Last active American service member to have served in World War II

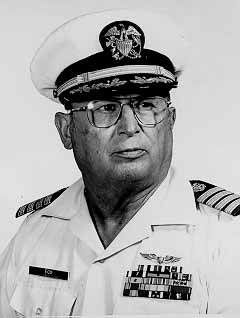
- Fox in 1989
- Born: September 19, 1919; Fort Eustis, Virginia, U.S.
- Died: September 19, 2012 (aged 93); St. Petersburg, Florida, U.S.
- Military career
- Allegiance: United States
- Branch: United States Navy; United States Public Health Service Commissioned Corps
- Service years: 1942–1944 (Navy); 1944–1974 (Navy reserves); 1974–1999 (US Public Health Service detailed to the Coast Guard)
- Conflicts: World War II
- Awards: Silver Star; Bronze Star (2x)

Earl Russell H. Fox (September 19, 1919 – September 19, 2012) was an American physician and commissioned officer who served in the Navy and later in the United States Public Health Service Commissioned Corps detailed to the Coast Guard. Upon his retirement in November 1999, he was the last active-duty member of a United States uniformed service who had served during the Second World War.

== Early life ==
Earl Fox was born on September 19, 1919 in Fort Eustis, Virginia to Nellie Sweet Fox and Earl Judson Fox. Believed to be stillborn, Fox was left for dead by doctors attending to his mother, who only returned after they had heard him crying from another room. At age 7, Fox's father died in a car accident, leaving his mother to have to raise him and his two brothers.

== Military career ==
Fox graduated from the University of Richmond in 1941 and served in the United States Navy during World War II, being tasked with working on several submarines in the South Pacific and in the South China Sea. Following the war, he joined the Navy Reserves and was granted an age waiver at 55 to join the Coast Guard as a US Public Health Service Commissioned Corps (USPHS) officer detailed to the Coast Guard. When detailed to the armed forces such as the Coast Guard, USPHS officers fall under the chain of command of that service and have military status and rank. During the following 25 years, he served in Coast Guard medical assignments including Air Station St. Petersburg, Training Center Cape May, Support Center Elizabeth City, Governors Island, Coast Guard Headquarters, and Coast Guard Personnel Command. For his efforts in World War II, he was awarded both the Silver Star and two Bronze Stars.

Fox retired in November 1999, having been notified earlier that year by then President Bill Clinton that he was the last servicemember that participated in World War II still in active duty.

== Personal life ==
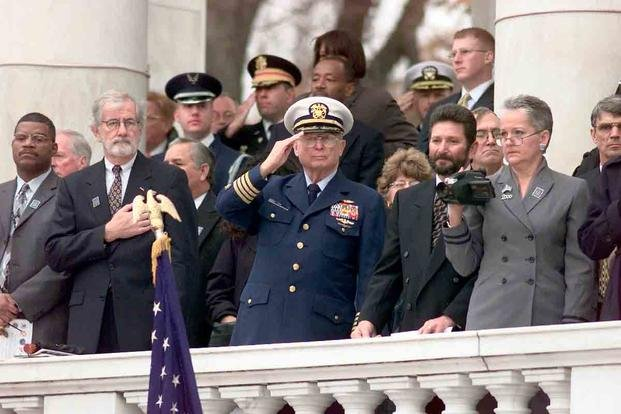
Fox at his retirement ceremony in 1999

Following his service in World War II, Fox studied medicine at the Medical College of Virginia, and moved with his family to St. Petersburg, Florida. As he had worked in both the Navy and in the medical field, the United States Coast Guard asked Fox to join, and he did so as a United States Public Health Service officer detailed to the Coast Guard at age fifty five, completing helicopter school and becoming a flight surgeon.

Fox died in 2012 on his 93rd birthday in St. Petersburg, Florida.
