= Igor II of Kiev =

Grand Prince of Kiev in 1146

Saint Igor of Kiev and Chernigov
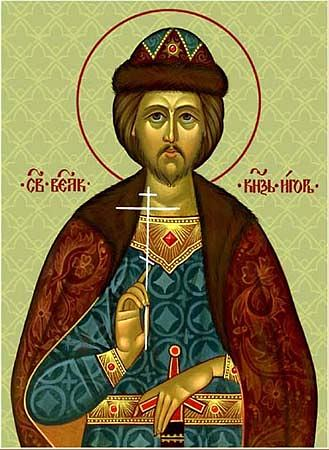

Right-Believing Martyr
- Died: 19 September, 1147
- Honored in: Eastern Orthodox Church
- Feast: 19 September

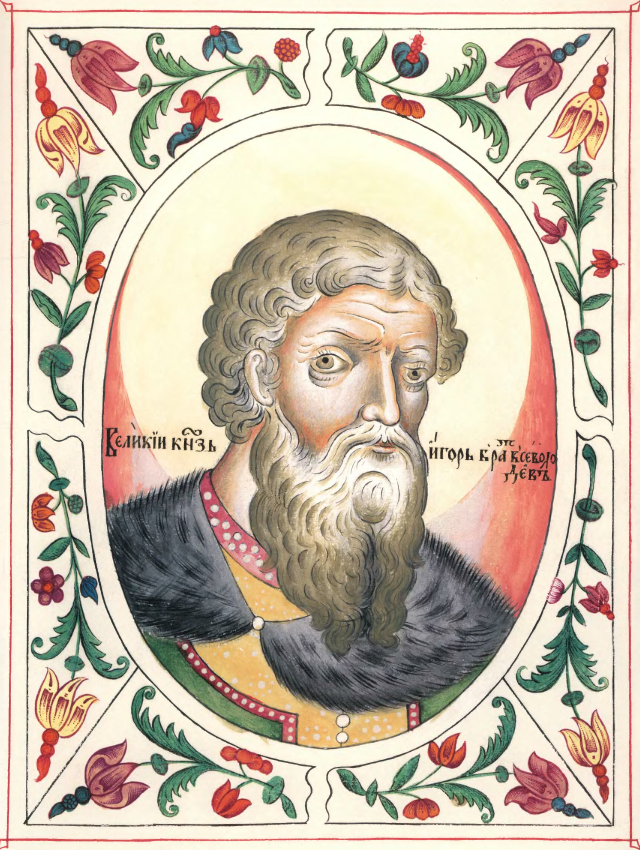
Portrait in the Tsarsky titulyarnik (1672)

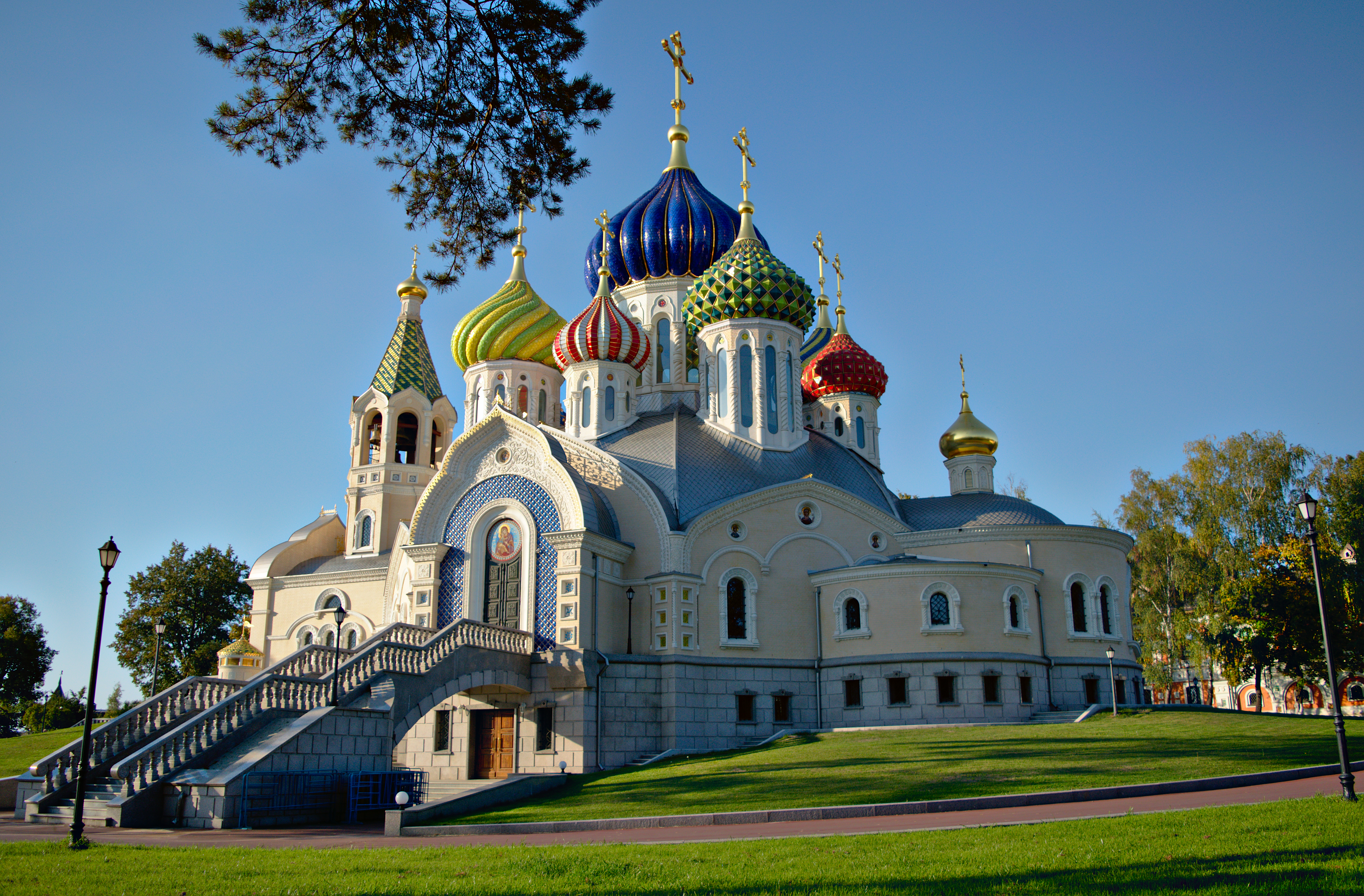
The Church of St. Igor of Chernigov in Moscow

Igor II Olgovich (Note: Russian: Игорь II Ольгович; Ukrainian: Ігор II Ольгович, romanized: Ihor II Olhovych) (died September 19, 1147) was Prince of Chernigov and Grand Prince of Kiev (1146). He was a son of Oleg I of Chernigov.

He was the chosen successor of his brother, Vsevolod II of Kiev. Though his brother had extracted promises of loyalty from his Kievan subjects, Igor and his family, the Olgovichi, were unpopular and there was resistance against his accession. The chroniclers accused Igor of being dishonest, greedy, scheming, and violent. He had reigned less than two weeks before the Kievans invited his cousin and rival, Iziaslav II, to be their prince. Reneging on a promise he had made not to seek power, Iziaslav attacked and defeated Igor and his brother Sviatoslav.

Sviatoslav escaped, but Igor got bogged down in some marshes and was unable to flee because of an infirmity in his legs. He was captured, and Iziaslav had him thrown into a pit. He languished in the pit until autumn 1146, when, desperately ill, he requested permission to become a monk. Iziaslav released him, but Igor was so weak he had to be carried from the pit and nearly died of illness. He became a monk at the monastery of St. Feodor in Kiev under the name Ignati.

In 1147, a mob attacked Igor under the mistaken impression that he intended to usurp Iziaslav's throne. Iziaslav's brother, Vladimir, tried to rescue Igor, but the mob tore down a balcony on which Igor had sought sanctuary, and thus killed him. His body was dragged behind a cart and exhibited in a market before it could be salvaged by Vladimir. Miracles were alleged to have occurred around Igor's body, and he was proclaimed a saint-martyr. Eventually his remains were sent to the Transfiguration Cathedral in Chernigov.

== Veneration ==
Igor is venerated as a saint in the Eastern Orthodox Church, with his feast day being on 19 September. He bears the saint titles of "Right-Believing and "Martyr"

== Sources ==
- Dimnik, Martin. The Dynasty of Chernigov, 1146-1246, 2003

Preceded by Vsevolod II of Kiev	Grand Prince of Kiev; 1146	Succeeded by Iziaslav II of Kiev
