= Meletios the Younger =

Byzantine Greek Monk, Pilgrim and Priest

Meletios the Younger (c. 1035 – c. 1105), also called Meletios of Myoupolis or Meletios the New (Greek: Μελέτιος ο Νέος), was a Byzantine Greek monk, pilgrim and priest. He is venerated as a saint in Eastern Orthodoxy and his feast is celebrated on 1 September.

== Biography ==
Meletios was born in the Cappadocian village of Moutalaske, which was also the birthplace of Sabbas the Sanctified. At fifteen or sixteen years of age, he ran away from home to Constantinople, the capital of Byzantine Empire, where he became a monk. He lived there for three years, before setting out on a pilgrimage. He quickly halted his pilgrimage, however, to join the eukterion (oratory) of Saint George near Thebes. After ten years and aged about 28, he left Saint George on a series of pilgrimages that brought him to the Holy Land, Rome and possibly Santiago de Compostela. He stayed in the Holy Land for three years, visiting Jerusalem, Galilee and both sides of the river Jordan. He visited several monasteries, including that of Saint Sabbas, his compatriot. Upon his return to Greece, he settled on Mount Myoupolis and Patriarch Nicholas III of Constantinople consecrated him a priest. By around 1081 he had acquired the nearby monastery of the Symboulon, which came to be known as Hosios Meletios after him. There he introduced Palestinian monastic practices, including combining monks with anchorites in paralauria. In his later years, he received an annual donation of 422 hyperpyra from the Emperor Alexios I Komnenos. He died in his monastery around 1105 or 1110.

Two biographies of Meletios were written after 1141 by Nicholas of Methone and Theodore Prodromos. Although largely independent of one another, Theodore appears to have had access to Nicholas' account. They occasionally contradict each other, but are nonetheless valuable historical sources because of their emphasis on Meletios' interactions with the Byzantine elite. Of the two, Theodore's is the more worldly and entertaining, giving more space to Meletios' pilgrimages. He claims that Meletios left Thebes only after a noble Theban lady attempted to seduce him. He also records how a group of "Hagarenes" (Muslims) harassed the saint, who was rescued from his predicament by a Christian Arab. He is the only one to mention a pilgrimage to Compostela in Spain. Nicholas focuses more attention on Meletios' care for his monastic community, whom he protects from fire and whose gardens he defends from rabbits.

== Hagiographies ==
- Nicholas of Methone, "Vita sancti Meletii iunioris" [= BHG 1247], ed. Vasily Vasilievsky, Pravoslavnyi Palestinskii Sbornik VI (Saint Petersburg, 1866), pp. 1–39.
- —, "Bios tou hosiou patros hēmōn Meletiou tou en tō horei tēs Myoupoleōs askēsantos", in Iōannēs Polemēs (ed.), Hoi bioi tou hagiou Meletiou tou Neou (Athens: Ekdoseis Kanakē, 2018), pp. 30–150.
- Theodore Prodromos, "Vita sancti Meletii iunioris" [= BHG 1248], ed. Vasily Vasilievsky, Pravoslavnyi Palestinskii Sbornik VI (Saint Petersburg, 1866), pp. 40–69.
- —, "Bios tou hosiou patros hēmōn Meletiou tou Neou", in Iōannēs Polemēs (ed.), Hoi bioi tou hagiou Meletiou tou Neou (Athens: Ekdoseis Kanakē, 2018), pp. 152–254.
