= John the Silent =

6th-century Greek bishop and saint

Saint John the Silent
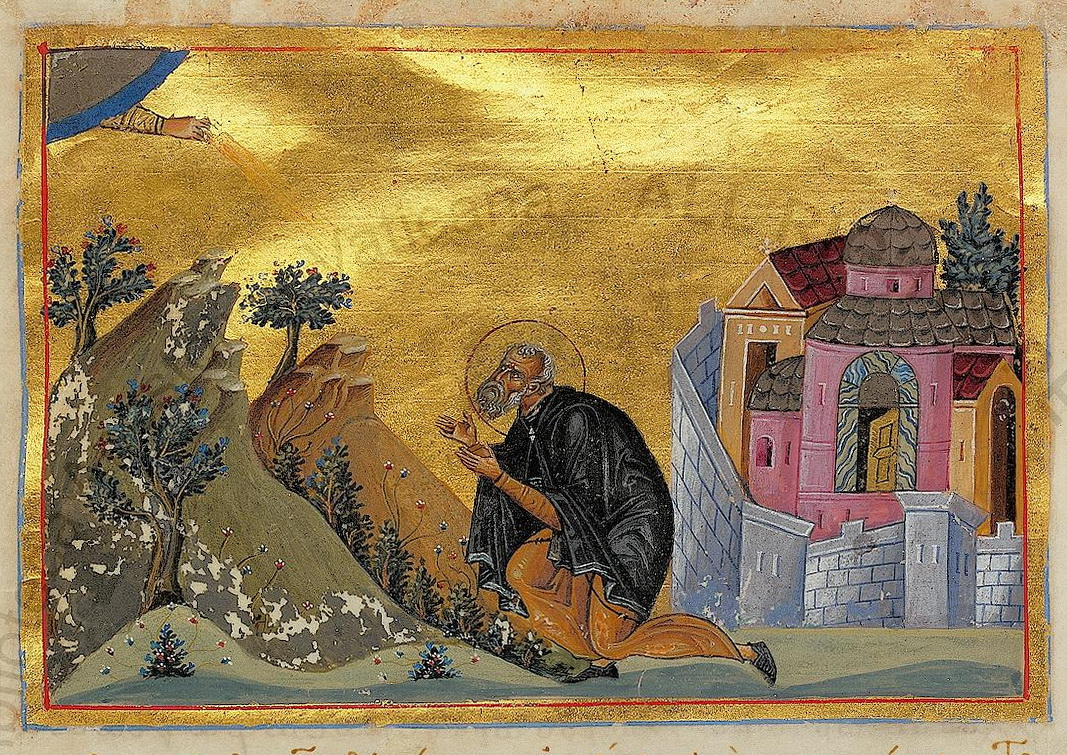
- Icon of Saint John the Silent from the Menologion of Basil II
- Born: January 8, 454 Nicopolis, Armenia Prima (modern-day Koyulhisar, Turkey)
- Died: 13 May 558 (aged 104) Jerusalem, Palaestina Prima
- Venerated in: Catholic Church; Eastern Orthodox Church
- Feast: May 13 (Roman Catholic Church); December 3 (Oriental Catholic Church and Eastern Orthodox Church)

John the Silent (c. January 8, 454 – c. 558), also known as "John the Hesychast" (Greek: Ἅγιος Ἰωάννης ὁ Ἡσυχαστής), was a Christian saint known for living alone for 76 years. He was given the surname because of his affinity for recollection and silence. His feast day is May 13 in the General Roman Calendar of the Catholic Church, and December 3 in Eastern Orthodox and Eastern Catholic Churches.

== Biography ==
John was born in 454 AD in Nicopolis, Armenia (modern-day Koyulhisar, Turkey). He came from a family of mainly generals and governors. His parents died when he was 18, and he then built a monastery where he stayed with 10 young monks. Under John's direction, they led a life of hard work and devotion.

John built a reputation for leadership and sanctity, which led the archbishop of Sebaste to consecrate him bishop of Colonia in Armenia. He was only 28 at the time and had no desire for such a role. Nevertheless, he held the post of bishop for nine years. In 490, however, John went to Constantinople to secure the emperor's intervention to quell a local persecution. Having accomplished his mission, he did not return to Colonia, but seeking to return to a life of seclusion, he instead went to Jerusalem.

His biographer says that while John was praying one night, he saw a bright cross form in the air and heard a voice say to him, "If you desire to be saved, follow this light." He saw the light move and point to the monastery of Sabbas the Sanctified. At 38 years old he joined the monastery, which then held 150 monks. Around 494, Sabas let John have a separate hermitage for uninterrupted contemplation. For five days a week he fasted only leaving his cell on Saturdays and Sundays when he went to public Mass. After three years of this, he was made the steward of the monastery.

John had never told anyone he had been bishop, so after four years Sabas thought John was worthy to become a priest and presented him to the patriarch Elias of Jerusalem. They travelled to Calvary for the ordination, but upon their arrival John requested a private audience with the patriarch. John said, "Holy Father, I have something to impart to you in private; after which, if you judge me worthy, I will receive holy orders." They spoke in private after a promise of secrecy. "Father, I have been ordained bishop; but on account of the multitude of my sins have fled, and am come into this desert to wait the visit of the Lord." The patriarch was startled, but told Sabas, "I desire to be excused from ordaining this man, on account of some particulars he has revealed to me." Sabas was afraid John had committed a crime, but after he prayed God revealed the truth to him. Sabas complained to John about keeping the secret from him, and John wanted to leave the monastery. Sabas convinced him to stay by promising to keep his secret. John stayed in his cell for four years, speaking to no one except the person who brought him necessities.

In 503 AD certain turbulent disciples forced Sabas to leave his monastery. John moved to a nearby wilderness where he spent six years in silence, conversing only with God and eating only wild roots and herbs. He remained in the desert six years. When Sabas returned to his community, he found John and convinced him to move back to the monastery. John had become used to speaking only with God and found only bitterness and emptiness in anything else. He treasured obscurity and humility, so he wanted to live unknown to men, but was unable to do so. He returned with Sabas and lived in his cell for forty years. During this time he did not turn people away who desired his instruction.

One of these people was Cyril of Scythopolis, who wrote about John's life. Cyril had asked him what to do with his life, and John recommended he join the Laura of St. Euthymius, but Cyril did not listen; instead, he went to a small monastery on the bank of the Jordan River, where he fell ill regretted not listening to John. While there, John appeared to him in a dream, and after scolding him for not obeying, said that if he returned to St. Euthymius' monastery, he would get well and find his salvation. The next day he did so and was well again. John died in 558 AD at the age of 104. He lived in solitude for 76 years, interrupted only for the 9 years he was bishop.

== See also ==
- Hermit
