= Cyril of Scythopolis =

6th-century Palestinian monk historian

Cyril of Scythopolis (Greek: Κύριλλος ὁ Σκυθοπολίτης, romanized: Kyrillos ho Skythopolitēs; c. 525 – c. 559), also known as Cyrillus Scythopolitanus, was a Christian monk, priest and Greek-language hagiographer or historian of monastic life in Palestine in the 6th century AD.

== Life ==
Cyril was born in Scythopolis, in the province of Palaestina Secunda, sometime around 525. His father John, a lawyer, supervised his early religious education. Shortly after 532 he became an anagnostes (lector), and became a monk in 543. Very soon thereafter he went to Jerusalem and spent some months at a hermit community (lavra) near the Jordan River, before entering the monastery of Euthymius the Great at Jericho in 544. He remained there until 555, when he was one of the orthodox monks sent to replace those expelled for Origenism at the New Lavra of Saint Sabas (today in ruins at Bir el-Wa'ar near Teqoa). Two years later he moved to the Great Lavra of Saint Sabas (today known as Mar Saba), where he died sometime in 557/558 or soon after.

Cyril was influenced by Saint Sabas the Sanctified, whom he had met when he was still in a young age. In later years, when he was in Jerusalem, he also met Saint John the Silent or the Hesychast, bishop of Colonia in Cappadocia.

== Works ==
Cyril is known for a number of hagiographies of seven Palestinian monks: Sabbas the Sanctified, Euthymius the Great, John the Silent, Cyriacus the Anchorite, Theodosius the Cenobiarch, Theognius of Bethany, and Abramius. This ambitious undertaking was "fostered both by local patriotism and a firm belief in the relationship between holiness and the desert". As the historical information included in these works is both precise and accurate, Cyril is a valuable historical source for the period, on topics ranging from political affairs to ecclesiastical events and biographical details. Cyril is particularly valuable on the study of the Arab tribes of the region, notably the Ghassanids and their rivals, the Lakhmids.

Apart for the seven monks to whom he dedicated entire vitas, he contributed biographical and hagiographic details for several more, such as:

- Mary of Egypt (c. 344–421)
- Severian of Scythopolis (died 452/453)
- Theodosius the Cenobiarch (c. 423–529)

== Sources ==
- Baldwin, Barry; Talbot, Alice-Mary (1991). "Cyril of Skythopolis". In Kazhdan, Alexander (ed.). The Oxford Dictionary of Byzantium. Oxford and New York: Oxford University Press. p. 573. ISBN 0-19-504652-8.
- Karl Suso Frank (1991). "Kyrillos von Skythopolis". Lexikon des Mittelalters, V: Hiera-Mittel bis Lukanien (in German). Stuttgart and Weimar: J. B. Metzler. col. 1600. ISBN 3-7608-8905-0.
- Shahîd, Irfan (1995). Byzantium and the Arabs in the Sixth Century. Volume 1, Part 1: Political and Military History. Washington, DC: Dumbarton Oaks Research Library and Collection. ISBN 978-0-88402-214-5.
