= Euthymius the Great =

Armenian Christian abbot and hermit (377–473)

Saint Euthymius the Great
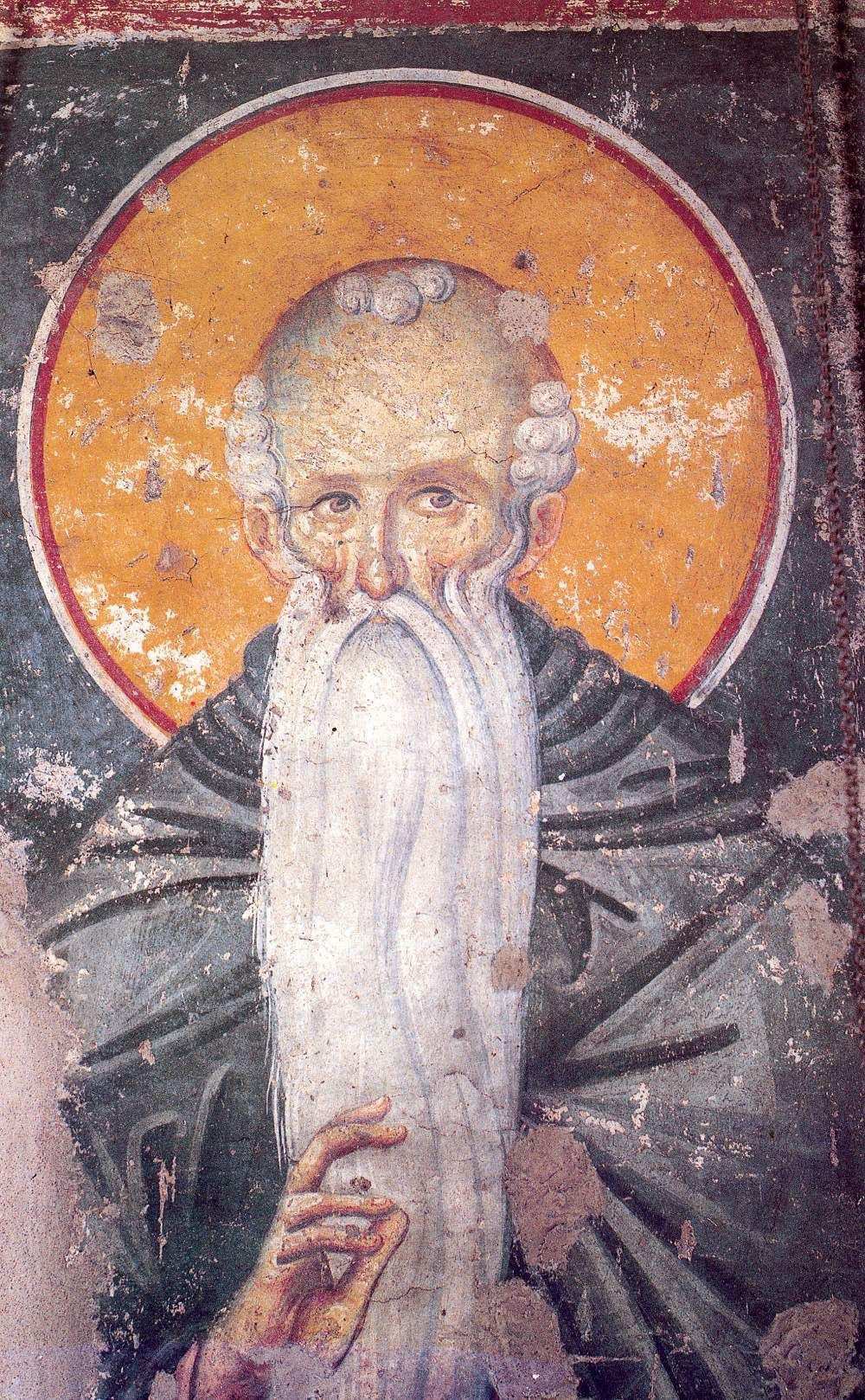
- Church fresco depicting Saint Euthymius

Venerable
- Born: 377; Melitene, Lesser Armenia (modern-day Malatya, Turkey)
- Died: January 20, 473 (aged 95–96); Judean Desert, Palaestina Prima
- Venerated in: Eastern Orthodoxy; Roman Catholicism
- Major shrine: Monastery of Euthymius
- Feast: 20 January
- Attributes: Monastic habit, scroll

Euthymius the Great (377 – 20 January 473) was an abbot in Palestine. He is venerated in both Roman Catholic and Eastern Orthodox Churches.

Euthymius' vita was written by Cyril of Skythopolis, who describes him as the founder of several monasteries in the Judaean desert, while remaining a solitary monk in the tradition of Egyptian monasticism. He nevertheless played a decisive role in helping the decisions of the Council of Chalcedon (451) prevail in Jerusalem, in spite of the majority of the monks in the region opposing it.

== Life ==
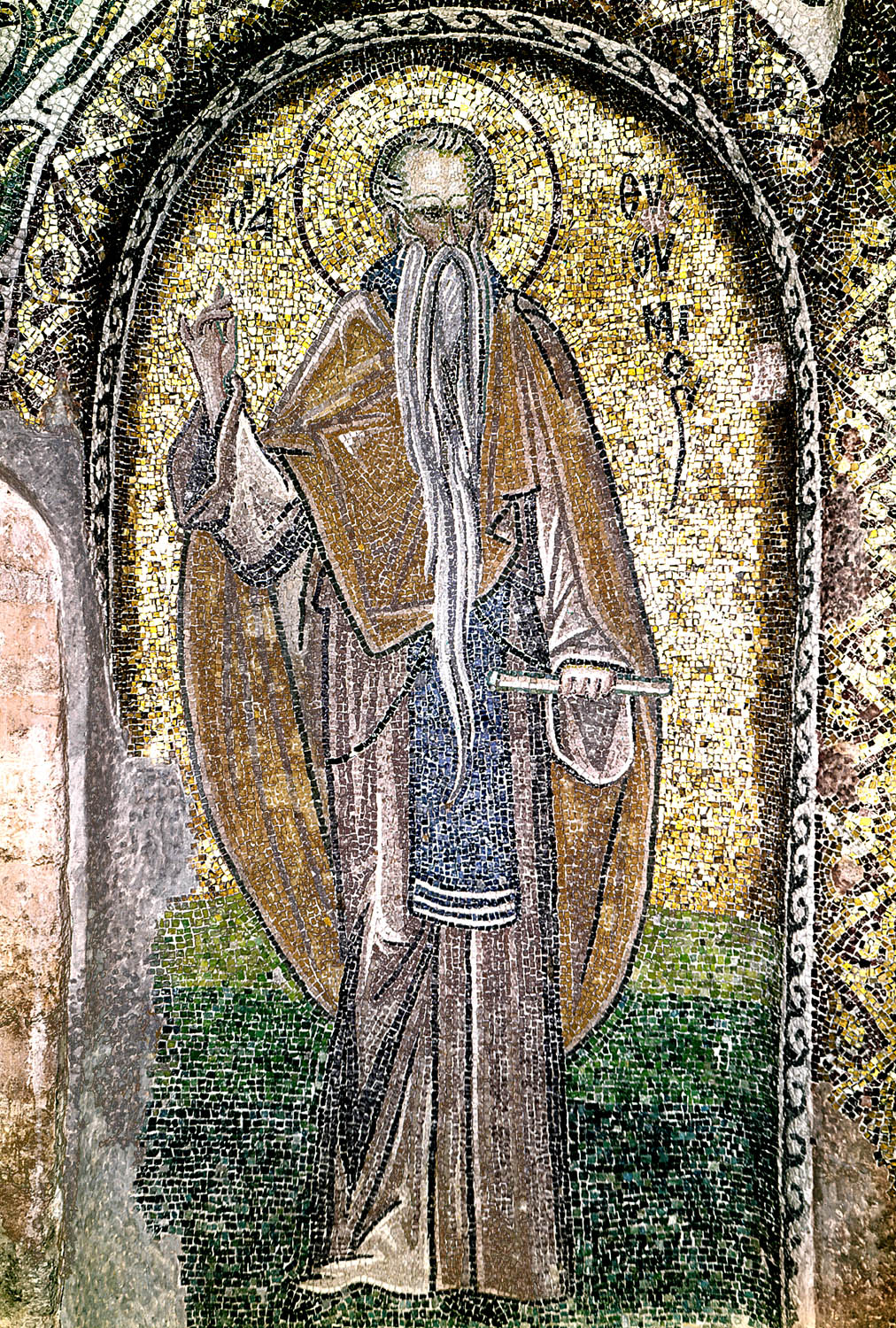
Byzantine mosaic of Saint Euthymius

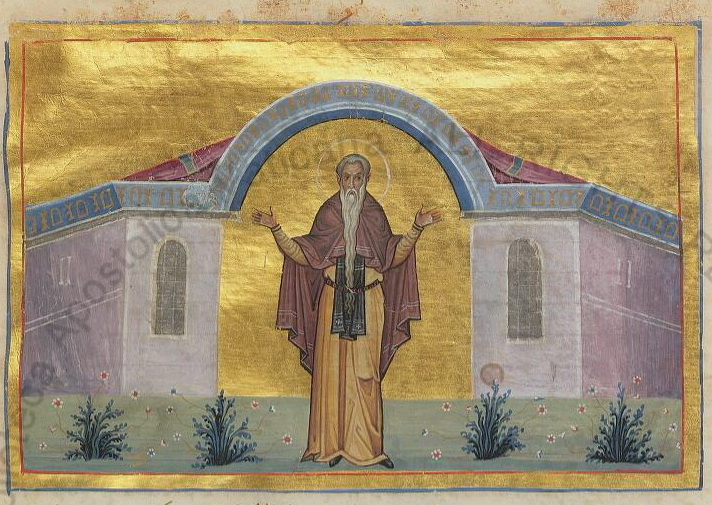
Euthymius the Great as depicted in the Menologion of Basil II

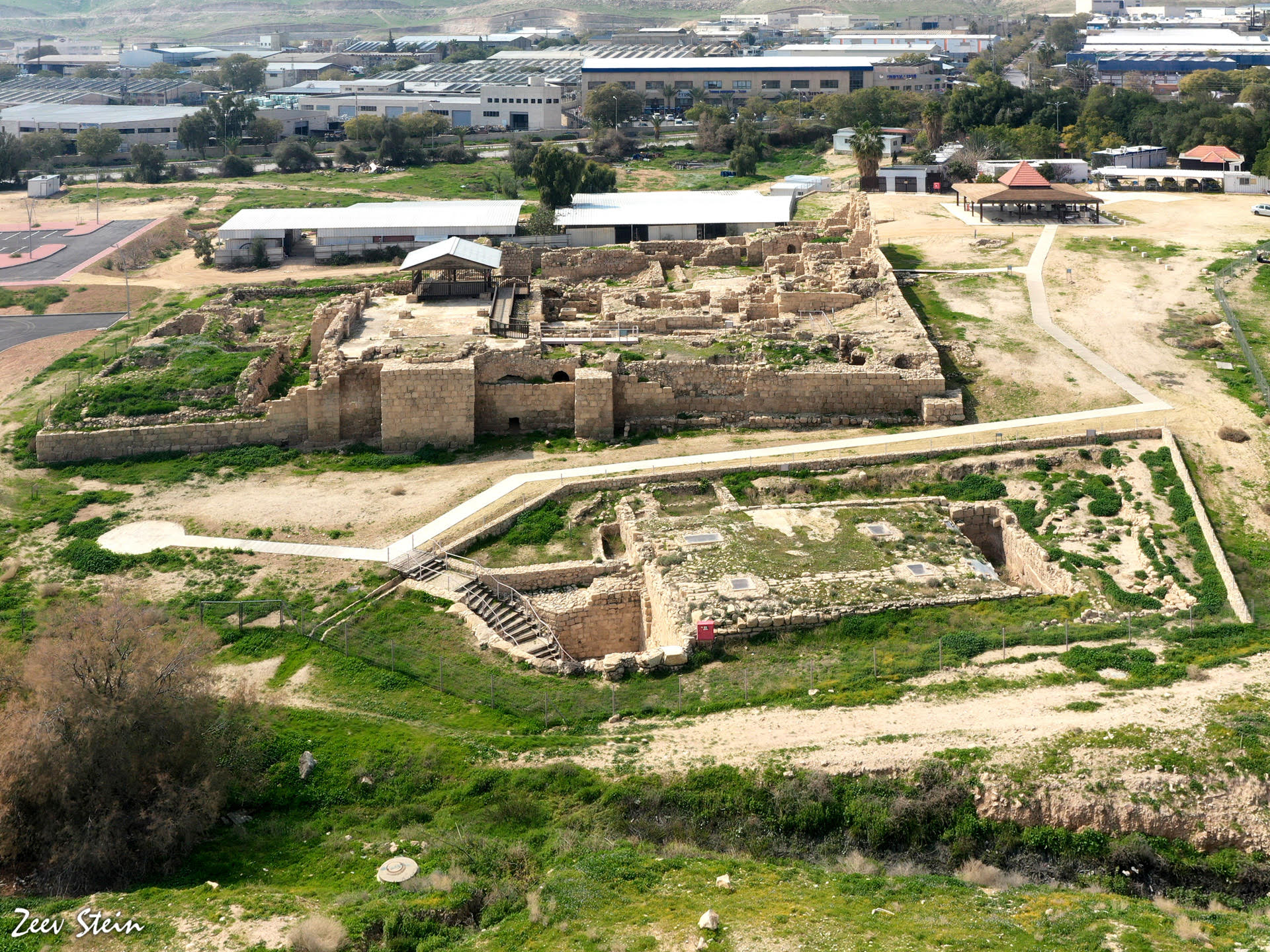
Monastery of Euthymius

The vita of Euthymius has been written by Cyril of Scythopolis.

=== Melitene ===
Euthymius was born in Melitene in Lesser Armenia in 377, in a pious family of noble birth. According to Christian tradition, his parents, Paul and Dionysia, had prayed for a son at the church of Saint Polyeuctus in Melitene. When the child was born, they named him Euthymius, meaning "good cheer".

Euthymius was educated by Bishop Otreius of Melitene, who afterwards ordained him and placed him in charge of all the monasteries in the Diocese of Melitene.

=== Pharan near Jerusalem ===
In 405 or 406, at twenty-nine or thirty years of age, he secretly set out on a pilgrimage to Jerusalem and remained for five years there in an anchoritic cell he built for himself in a cave near the laura (settlement of monks) of Pharan, about six miles east of Jerusalem, at Ein Fara in Wadi Kelt.

=== Monastery of Theoctistus ===
In 411, Euthymius withdrew into the wilderness (Greek eremos) with a fellow hermit from Pharan, Theoctistus (see below), living in a rough cavern on the banks of a torrent. When many disciples gathered around them, they turned the cavern into a church and established a monastery. Because the cave location was not suitable for a laura, it developed into a coenobium (communal monastic settlement), the first of its kind in the Judaean Desert.

Cyril of Skythopolis is describing how a miraculous cure effected by Euthymius for Terebon, the son of the Saracen chief called "Aspebetus" by Cyril (in fact probably the Persian title of the man, "spahbed"), led the latter and his entire tribe into adopting Christianity, with Aspebetus being baptised as Peter. The tribe of Peter settled near the monastery.

In 421, ten years after arriving at the site, which became known as the monastery of Theoctistus, Euthymius moved on, leaving the coenobium in the charge of the latter.

=== Marda and Caparbaricha ===
The newly established monastery had attracted too much activity for Euthymius' liking, who remained a philésychos (wikt:φιλήσυχος), one "who loves his peace and quiet". He left for the wilderness together with a young countryman, Domitian, the only close companion he would ever admit, whom he would have by his side throughout his life.

When the report of the miracle Euthymius had performed on Terebon, the name of Euthymius became famous throughout Palestine, and large crowds came to visit him in his solitude, he retreated with his disciple Domitian to the wilderness of Ruba, near the Dead Sea, living for some time on a remote mountain called Marda by the Byzantines - no other than the ancient Masada of Roman-era fame.

Next, in 422, Euthymius is credited with establishing the monastery of Caparbaricha after moving to the desert east of Tell Ziph.

=== Monastery of Euthymius ===
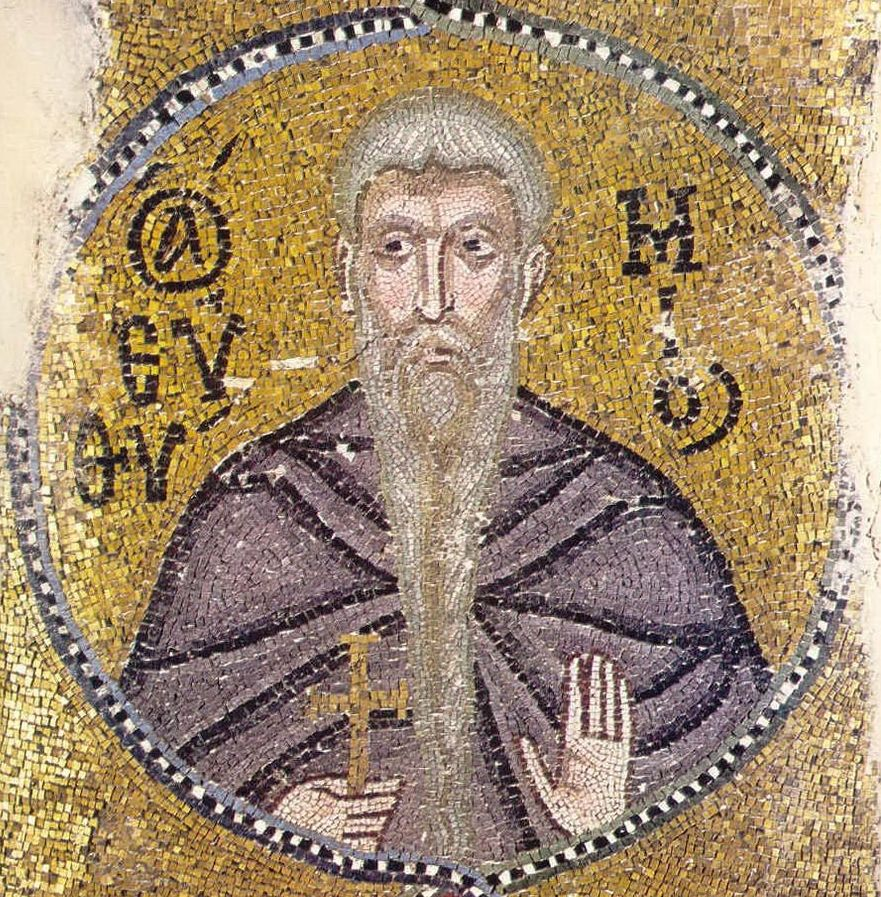
11th century Byzantine mosaic of Saint Euthymius from Nea Moni in Chios

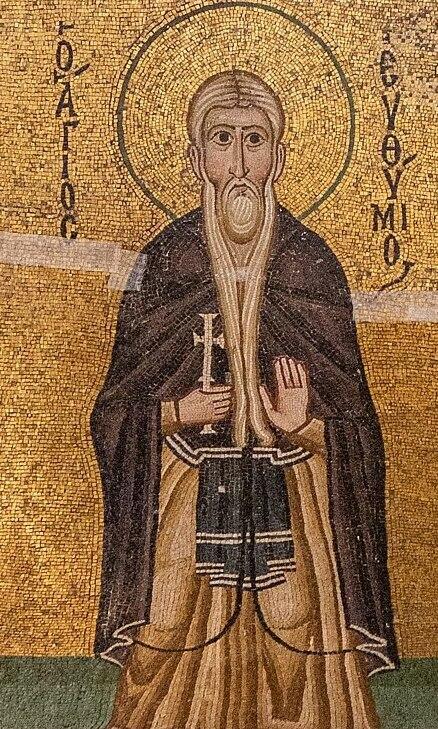
Saint Euthymius mosaic from the monastery of Hosios Loukas in Greece

==== Hermitage ====
He eventually returned to the plateau west of the monastery of Theoctistus, at a site, according to Cyril, not located on any thoroughfare which offered the quiet he sought and lived there together with Domitian in a cave organised as a simple hermitage. However, fact is that the site is in close proximity to the road from Jerusalem to Jericho, on its western side. Peter, the Bedouin chief Euthymius had baptised, joined him and had a number of facilities built for the two: a large cistern, three cells, a chapel and a bakery. Anyone who wished to join was sent to Theoctistus' coenobium, the third cell probably being used for guests.

==== Monastery of the Paremboles ====
Euthymius advised Peter on building a monastery for his people near his own hermitage. Maris, Terebon's uncle, financed the construction of the monastery, the tribe settled around it in an encampment, "parembole" in Greek, and Euthymius intervened with the patriarch of Jerusalem, Juvenal, to ordain Peter. Euthymius is credited to be the founder of the monastery, known as the monastery of the Paremboles. Apparently Aspebetus/Peter did indeed become a priest around 427, while also remaining a phylarch, i.e. a tribal chief allied to the Empire. He even received the rank of a bishop with the title "Bishop of Parembolæ", i.e. "of the Camps", given the nomadic nature of his flock, in which capacity he went on to attend the Council of Ephesus in 431.

==== Laura of Euthymius ====
Euthymius, who initially had no intention of founding a monastery around his cave, was eventually moved by a revelatory dream (according to tradition) or by the arrival of a group of monks from his home country, to allow a laura to emerge, totalling twelve monks - him and eleven followers. Euthymius didn't allow this number to grow, directing anyone additional who wished to join toward the monastery of Theoctistus. Only after facing a situation in which Euthymius had to perform a miracle, filling up the insufficiently provisioned pantry with bread, oil and wine when faced with a group of 400 Armenian pilgrims, coming from Jerusalem on their way to the Jordan, did he allow for the extension of the laura to accommodate 50 monks. The excess numbers still were sent to live in Theoctistus' coenobium - especially the novices. The monastic rule of the laura was copied after that of Pharan, which was familiar to Euthymius and mirrored the Egyptian model. Peter was instructed how to build the facilities, which included unusually small cells, due to Euthymius' very strict concepts of monastic life. Unlike the Egyptian lauras, which were only inhabited by Copts, the Holy Land attracted monks from the entire Christian world, making the monastic population in Palestine extremely cosmopolitan. As long as Euthymius and Theoctistus were alive, their monasteries developed a strong cooperation, both in terms of personnel (novices and young monks first went to the latter's coenobium), and economically, sharing property and a hostel in Jerusalem.

The church of the laura was dedicated on 7 May 428 by archbishop Juvenal, later to become the first patriarch of Jerusalem, with other heads of the Jerusalem church also being present.

Euthymius was a consistent supporter of the Orthodox faction during the theological conflicts discussed at the Councils of Ephesus (449) and Chalcedon (451). During the temporary takeover of the Jerusalem bishopric by the Monophysites, Euthymius left his monastery for the desert, accompanied by a small group of monks. When he returned after two years, in 453, his position was more solid than ever before. It was greatly due to the authority of Euthymius that most of the Eastern recluses eventually accepted the Chalcedonian decrees, and the Empress Eudoxia was converted to Orthodoxy through his efforts. By the 450s, Euthymius' laura was at the centre of a network of monasteries and churches founded by his associates or pupils, with yet other pupils reaching high positions in the Jerusalem church hierarchy. Euthymius had become the leader of the monastic movement in the Judaean Desert.

St Sabbas arrived in Palestine as a young man in 457 and was sent by Euthymius to the coenobium of Theoctistus shortly after. He would later become a renowned archimandrite of the hermits in the country.

== Death, burial and feast day ==
Euthymius remained in good health until the age of 94, dying on 20 January 473, and was buried in a specially built tomb inside his monastery. Theoctistus had died a few years earlier, on 3 September 466.

The Church celebrates his feast on the day of his death, 20 January; for Orthodox Christians who still go by the Julian calendar, the feast falls on 2 February on the Gregorian calendar.

== Theoctistus ==
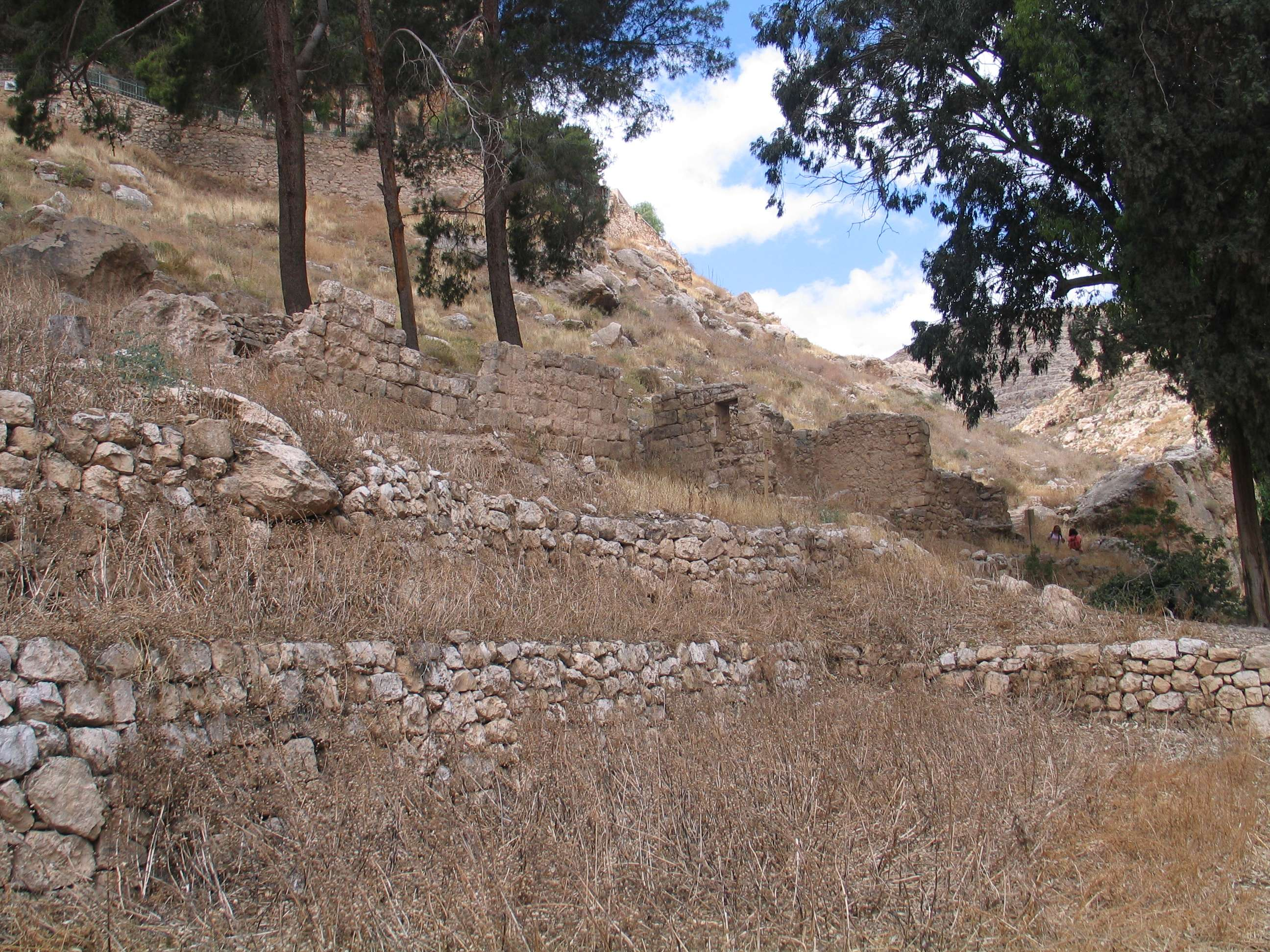
Remains of Faran/Pharan monastery

Theoctistus (also spelled Theoktistos) of Palestine was an associate of Euthymius. He was an ascetic who lived in a nearby cell at the Pharan lavra. About five years after Euthymius arrived, they went into the desert for Great Lent, and found in a wadi a large cave where they remained praying in solitude for some time. Eventually shepherds from Bethany discovered them, and people from the area began to visit seeking spiritual guidance and bringing food. The monks then built a church. When other monks came seeking instruction, Euthymius and Theoctistus built a lavra over the cave church. Theoctistus became hegumen of the monastery.

Theoctistus died at an advanced age in 451 and is commemorated on 3 September.

== See also ==
- Anthony the Great (c. 251–356), Christian monk regarded as the founder of Christian monasticism
- Chariton the Confessor (late 3rd century – c. 350), founder of lavra-style monasticism in the Judaean Desert
- Euthymiac History, a fragmentary work, possibly a biography of Euthymius the Great
- Monastery of Martyrius, a monastery founded by Saint Martyrius near Jerusalem

== Bibliography ==
- This article incorporates text from a publication now in the public domain: Herbermann, Charles, ed. (1913). "St. Euthymius". Catholic Encyclopedia. New York: Robert Appleton Company.
- Schwartz, Eduard (1939). Kyrillos von Skythopolis [Cyril of Scythopolis] (in German). Leipzig: J. C. Hinrichs. pp. 358-59 – via Internet Archive. Greek text of the vita of Euthymius and commentary, mainly pp. 358–59 (in German).
