= Theognis (disambiguation) =

Theognis is the name of:

- Theognis of Megara, 6th century BC Greek elegiac poet
- Theognis (tyrant), one of the Thirty Tyrants of Athens in 404–403 BC (possibly to be identified with the minor tragic poet mentioned by Aristophanes)
- Theognis of Nicaea, 4th century AD bishop

Not confused with:

- Saint Theognius of Bethany (monk, 425–522)
