= Nahal Og =

Stream in the West Bank

Coordinates: 31.7775°N 35.4278°E

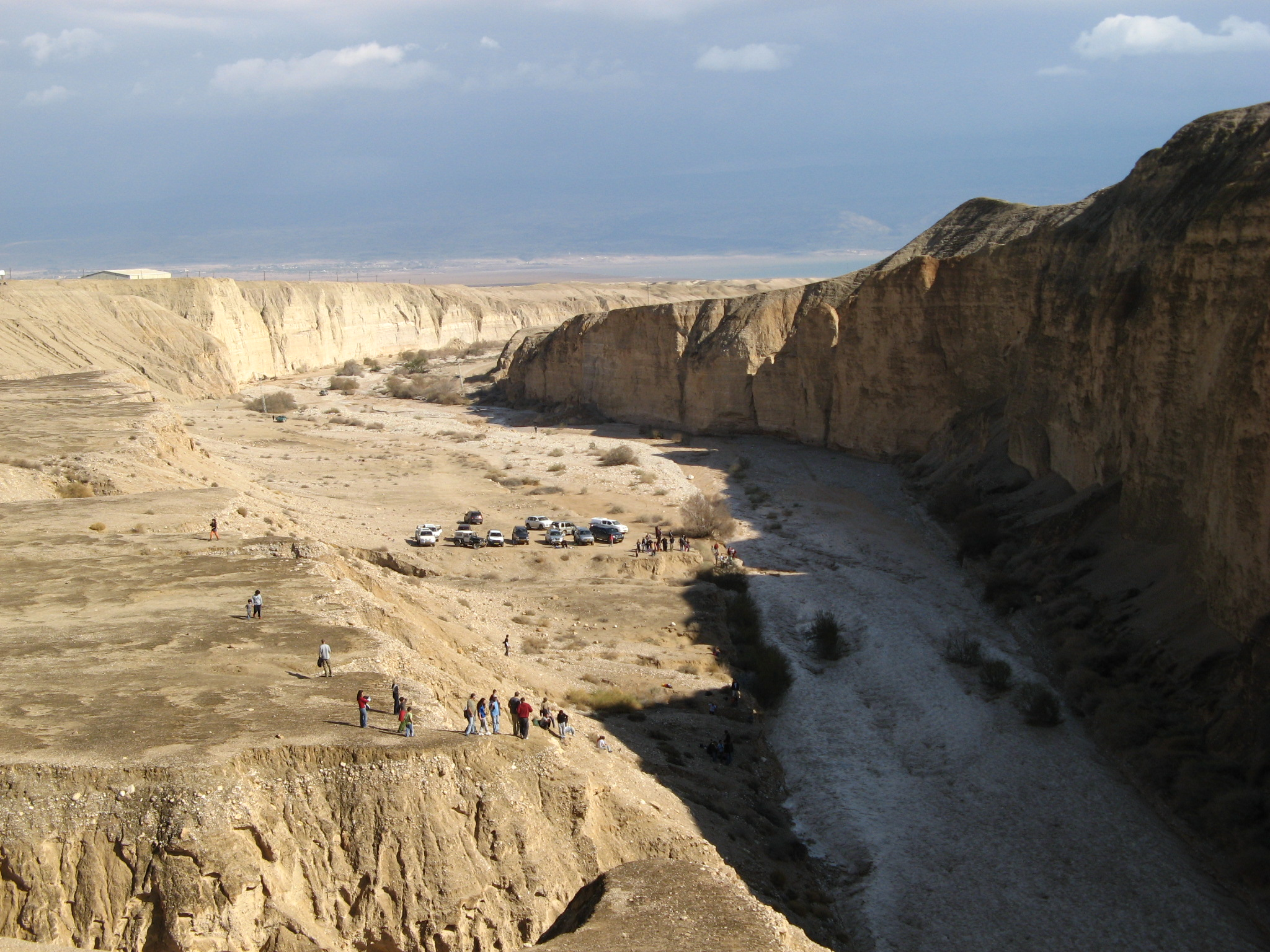
Nahal Og

Nahal Og or Wadi Og (Hebrew: נחל אוג), or Wadi al-Muqallek, also spelled Wadi Mukallik/Mukellik/Muqallik (Arabic: وادي مكلك) is a winterbourne stream on the West Bank that drains the eastern slopes of the Mount of Olives range east of Jerusalem and runs for 30 km till the Dead Sea. It is the northernmost of the streams that flow from the Judaean Desert into the Dead Sea.

== Name ==
=== Nahal Og ===
The Hebrew name of the stream is derived from the local sumac plant (Rhus tripartita), that grows in the wadi, which is named og in Hebrew. Nahal is the Hebrew word for wadi or creek, and the corresponding valley.

== Course and geography ==
=== Course ===
The wadi (seasonal stream) drains the slopes of the Mount of Olives, Mount Scopus and Abu Dis in Jerusalem at 800 m above sea level and descends till the Dead Sea at 400 m below sea level. The steepness of the stream results in heavy flooding during the winter, and in the past, parts of Highway 90 have been swept away. The stream sweeps mud and debris along with the water and sometimes during flooding times it is possible to see a trail of mud, hundreds of meters long, in the waters of the Dead Sea.

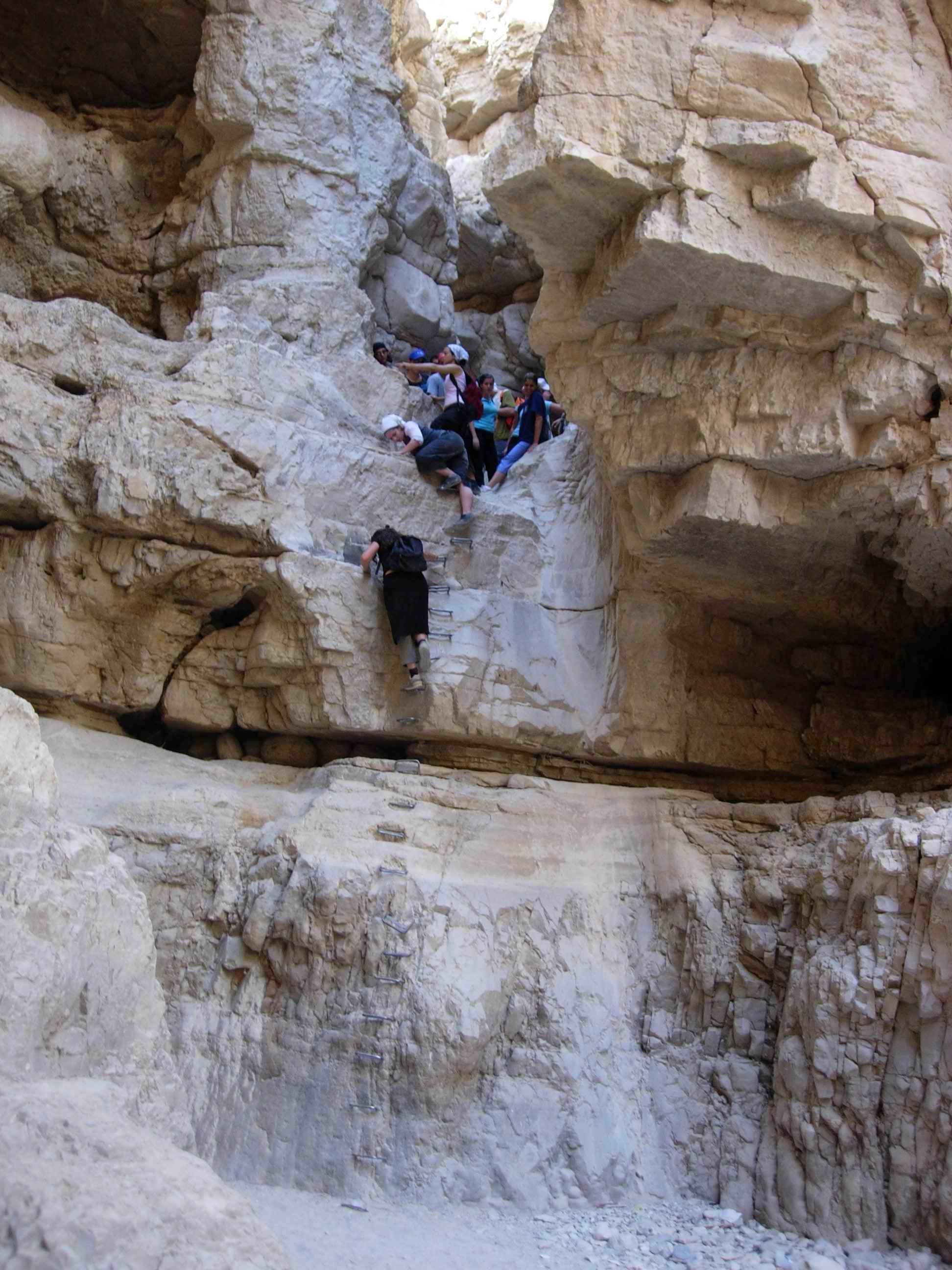

=== Ruins of the Monastery of Theoctistus ===
On the course of the wadi are the ruins of the Monastery of Theoctistus, known in Arabic as Deir Muqallik. They are hard to access, being situated quite high on the steep northern bank of the wadi at the spot where the valley deepens, turning into a canyon. According to Byzantine sources, it was established in the 5th century by Euthymius and Theoctistus (for more about the monastery see these two articles). Archaeologists confirm that the main phase of the cave church complex and related structures date back to the 5th-7th century, the monastery's 'golden era', with signs of a far less significant habitation period during the Early-Mid Muslim period in the 7th-11th or 12th century. The cave church complex was established at the beginning of the 5th century, and at the end of the 8th the monastery was deserted.

=== Lower course landmarks ===
At the foothills of the Judaean Mountains the stream passes by the Muslim shrine of Nabi Musa. In the plain, before reaching the Dead Sea, it also passes next to the kibbutz and Israeli settlement of Almog. Here, towards the end of the stream, a reservoir was built which stores waters from the floods that is used by Almog.

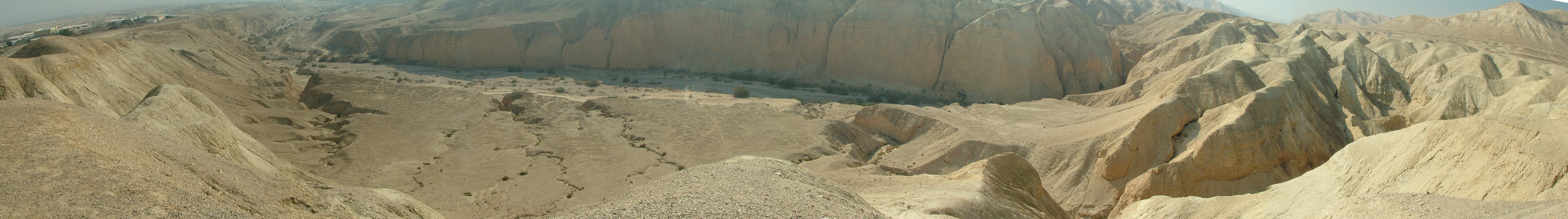
Panorama of Wadi Og from Og Lookout

== See also ==
- Sabbas the Sanctified, who lived at the monastery of Theoctistus starting in 457
