= Stephen the Sabaite =

Byzantine hymnographer and saint

St. Stephen the Sabaite
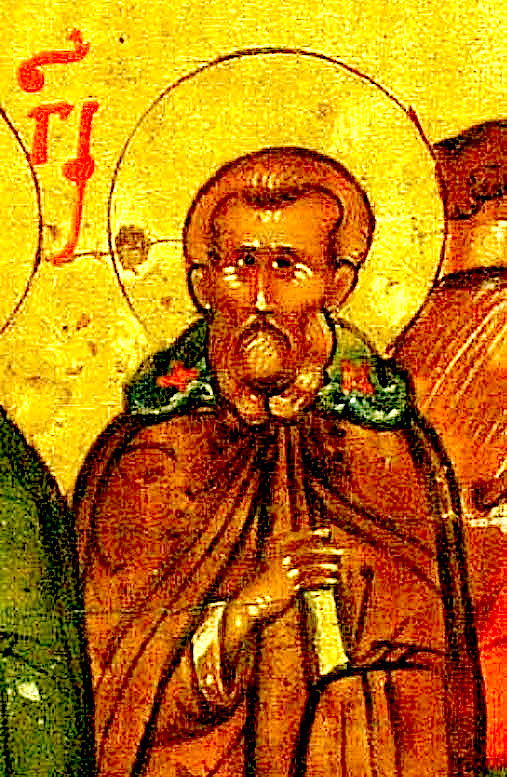
- Image from the Church and Archaeological Cabinet of the Moscow Theological Academy.

Stephen the Hymnographer
- Born: 725; Julis, Gaza
- Died: 796 or 807; Mar Saba
- Feast: 10 November [O.S. 28 October (where the Julian calendar is used)]

Saint Stephen the Sabaite (725 – 796 or 807), also known as Stephen the Hymnographer, was a Christian monk from Julis, Gaza, a district of Gaza. He was a nephew of St. John of Damascus and spent a half-century in the monastery of Mar Saba. He is venerated as a saint in the Eastern Orthodox Church.

== Life ==
Stephen lived the ascetic life at the Lavra of Saint Sabas in Palestine. Stephen was introduced to the monastic life by his uncle, and, at the age of ten, entered the same monastic community as his uncle, St. John Damascene. By his mid-twenties, he felt so drawn to a life of seclusion and contemplation, he asked the abbot of the community for permission to live as a hermit. Due to the great skill in giving spiritual direction he already showed at that young age, the abbot gave him limited permission. The condition was that he make himself available to others on weekends.

Towards the end of his life, Stephen reported that various cities, Gaza among them, were laid waste to and depopulated by the Saracens (another name for the Muslim Caliphate under the rule of the Umayyad and Abbasid dynasties, referenced in Acta martyrum Sabaitarum, AASS Mart. III, p. 167). On this occasion many monks of St. Sabas met their deaths.

== Work ==
Stephen and Andrew the Blind were among the first to compose hymns (idiomela) in the Triodion (the liturgical book used during Great Lent), chanted during the period between the Sunday of the Publican and Pharisee and Palm Sunday. These idiomela are stichera of which two were written for each weekday of Great Lent. One is chanted at the aposticha of Vespers and one at the aposticha of Matins, each being chanted twice. The idiomela are "exceptionally rich in doctrinal content, summing up the whole theology of the Great Fast".

The events of the time are recorded in the writings of Leontius of Damascus in his book The Life of St. Stephen the Sabaite.

His feast day is celebrated on October 28 on the Eastern Orthodox liturgical calendar (for those Eastern Orthodox Churches which follow the traditional Julian Calendar, October 28 falls on November 10 of the modern Gregorian Calendar).

In the past, Stephen the Sabaite was sometimes identified with the author known as Stephen of Thebes, but this writer must have lived several centuries earlier.
