= List of people from Kayseri =

This is a list of notable people from Kayseri.

== Born prior to 1900 ==
- Hyacinth of Caesarea (96–108), Christian saint
- Absalon of Caesarea, Christian saint
- Leontius of Caesarea (died 337), bishop
- Basil of Caesarea (330–379), Greek bishop and Christian saint
- Emmelia of Caesarea (died c. 375), mother of Basil
- Helladius of Caesarea (fl. 381), bishop
- Andreas of Caesarea (563–637), Greek theologian and bishop
- Arethas of Caesarea (born c. 860), Byzantine scholar and archbishop
- Kadi Burhan al-Din (1345–1398), Turkish poet and statesman
- Konstantinos Adosidis (1818-1895), Ottoman-appointed Prince of Samos
- Theodoros Kasapis (1835-1905), Cappadocian Greek who played a key role in the reform movement

== Born after 1900 ==
- Hulusi Akar, Former Chief of General Staff of Turkey and Current Minister of National Defense of Turkey
- Deniz Akkaya, model
- Göksel Arsoy, film actor
- Pelin Gündeş Bakır, politician representing Kayseri
- Sinan Bolat, footballer (goalkeeper)
- Umut Bulut, footballer
- Tuğba Daşdemir, alpine skier
- Orhan Delibaş, boxer
- Ebru Elhan, volleyball player
- Mustafa Elitaş, politician representing Kayeri
- Atilla Engin, jazz musician
- Nazim Erdem, Australian wheelchair rugby player, born in Kayseri
- A. Cemal Eringen, mechanician and engineering scientist
- Derviş Eroğlu, president of the TRNC
- Abdullah Gül, President of Turkey
- Metin Kaçan, novelist
- Elia Kazan (1909-2003), Greek American film director whose family originated from Kayseri in Cappadocia
- İhsan Ketin (1914 –1995) was a Turkish earth scientist
- Zeynep Murat, European champion Taekwondo practitioner
- Nesrin Nas, politician, leader of the Motherland Party (ANAP)
- Celil Oker, writer
- İsmet Özel, poet
- Tuncay Özilhan, businessman
- Ali Öztürk, footballer
- Hüsnü Özyeğin, businessman
- Erol Sabancı, businessman (Sabancı Holding)
- Sakıp Sabancı, businessman (Sabancı Holding)
- Şevket Sabancı, businessman (Sabancı Holding)
- Mimar Sinan, architect
- Fatih Solak, basketball player
- Mehmet Topuz, footballer
- Ali Turan, footballer
- Alparslan Türkeş, politician
- Taner Yıldız, politician representing Kayseri
