= Stephen of Thebes =

5th-century Roman-Egyptian Christian ascetic

A copy (dated 1493) of an Arabic epitome of Stephen's Sermo asceticus. The text is in Syriac script and the red text (rubric) marks the start of the work.

Stephen of Thebes (or Stephen the Theban) was a Roman Egyptian Christian ascetic writer who flourished around AD 400. Although virtually nothing is known about his life and he is scarcely studied in recent times, his works were once widely disseminated, translated and excerpted. Originally composed in either Greek or Coptic, translations into Arabic, Ethiopic, Georgian and Old Slavonic are also known and some excerpts were translated into Armenian.

== Life ==
What is known of Stephen's life is limited to what can be inferred from his name and his writings. He was probably a native of Thebes or the Thebaid in Upper Egypt. He probably lived in the late fourth to early fifth century. He was an ascetic who probably lived at least for a period in the monastic communities of the Nitrian Desert in Lower Egypt. His writings belong to the same Nitrian literary milieu as the Sayings of the Desert Fathers and the works of Evagrius Ponticus.

Stephen's writings stress the close relationship between the ascetic and his cell, which is typical of the quasi-anchoritic Nitrian asceticism. Several later sources explicitly call him an anchorite. The catalogue of the library of the Coptic monastery of Apa Elias of the Rock, lists as an author "Apa Stephen the Anchorite", which is the same name under which his work was copied in the Greek manuscript Parisinus Graecus 1598. Ibn Kabar, in his Lamp of Darkness, written in Arabic, places the annual remembrance of Stephen the Anchorite on Pashons 17 (May 7).

Stephen of Thebes may be the writer named Stephen who appears in two lists of Origenist writers in the Lausiac History of Palladius of Galatia, who wrote towards 420. Palladius claims that Melania the Elder read Origen, Gregory (either of Nyssa or Nazianzus), Stephen, Pierius and Basil, while Ammonius, one of the Tall Brothers, read six million lines of Origen, Pierius, Didymus the Blind and Stephen. Topically, Stephen of Thebes fits in these lists, but he is not known for his Origenist theology; Palladius may have had a different Stephen in mind.

In the past, Stephen has been erroneously identified with Stephen the Sabaite, who lived much later.

== Writings ==
Five writings attributed to Stephen are known. One is certainly spurious and the authenticity of two more has been questioned. Two are certainly by him:

1. Sermo asceticus (Logos asketikos) is the most important of his works and had a wide dissemination among both Chalcedonians and non-Chalcedonians. It survives in Greek, (Sahidic) Coptic, Arabic, Ethiopic and Georgian versions. The Greek is usually assumed to be original, but an argument has been made for the primacy of the Coptic version. Excerpts from the Sermo are also found in several collections of Paterica in Greek, Arabic, Ethiopic and Armenian. An Arabic epitome, probably by al-Ṣafī ibn al-ʿAssāl, also circulated. There are four surviving manuscripts of the Greek version, two of the Coptic, five of the Arabic (although one is a modern copy of another), one of the Ethiopic and one of the Georgian, plus two copies of the Arabic epitome, including one in Garshuni.
2. Commandments (Ἐντολαὶ, Entolai) is an ascetic treatise that is known in Greek as well as in Old Slavonic. This is the shortest work of Stephen. Its authenticity is not in doubt, but it was edited and reworked many times. It survives in 25 Greek and 23 Slavonic manuscripts. There are three distinct Greek recensions.
3. Diataxis (Διάταξις) is a monastic rule that survives in Greek and Old Slavonic. The authenticity of this work has been questioned. It appears to be no more than extracts from the Asceticon of Isaiah of Scetis, although it has also been argued that Isaiah may have borrowed from it in compiling his Asceticon. It survives in 10 Greek and 7 Slavonic manuscripts.
4. The short text known conventionally as Gnomai ('gnomic sayings') survives in Arabic and Ethiopic. Its authenticity has been questioned. It survives in three Ethiopic and two Arabic manuscripts, including one in Garshuni.
5. One work associated with Stephen the Sabaite came to be mistakenly attributed to Stephen of Thebes in its Slavonic translation. On the All-Night Vigils is in fact an extract from the Greek Life of Stephen the Sabaite by Leontius of Damascus. The excerpt is also known in Arabic and Georgian versions. It is found in seven Slavonic manuscripts, three Arabic and one Georgian. The Arabic and Georgian versions mistakenly attribute it to Stephen the Sabaite.

In addition, Georg Graf assigned a sermon On Penitence, found only in Arabic in six manuscripts, to Stephen of Thebes. He gave no argument and the attribution has nothing to recommend it.

== Bibliography ==
- Samir, Khalil (1991). "Stephen the Theban". In Aziz Suryal Atiya (ed.). The Coptic Encyclopedia. Vol. 7. New York: Macmillan Publishers. cols. 2154b–2155b.
- Suciu, Alin (2015). "Revisiting the Literary Dossier of Stephen of Thebes: With Preliminary Editions of the Greek Redactions of the Ascetic Commandments". Adamantius. 21: 301–325.
- Suciu, Alin (2018). "The Sermo Asceticus of Stephen the Theban in Sahidic Coptic". Journal of Theological Studies. 69 (2): 628–673 [1–46]. doi:10.1093/jts/fly099.
