= Moutalaske =

Town of ancient Cappadocia

Coordinates: 38°42′25″N 35°24′06″E

Moutalaske (Greek: Μουταλάσκη, romanized: Moutalaskē; the name may derive from the Aramaic mata la zkha, 'village of victory') was a town of ancient Cappadocia, inhabited in Byzantine times. It was the birthplace of both Saint Sabas (439) and Saint Meletios (c. 1035). The former, during a visit to emperor Anastasios I in Constantinople, sent money back to his home village in Moutalaske to fund the construction of a church dedicated to the Saints Cosmas and Damian.

Its site is located near Talas, Asiatic Turkey, about 6 km east of Kayseri, at the steep escarpment of a high plateau 200 m above the Kayseri basin. There are traces of a troglodyte settlement here including a monastery dedicated to Panagia (its naos and part of its choir were preserved in the vineyards of Nea Moutalaske around 1900) and, according to Hans Rott, two cave chapels dedicated to Saints Georgios and Koimesis.
