= Leontius of Damascus =

9th-century Syrian monk

Leontius of Damascus (fl. 790–821) was a Syrian monk who wrote a biography in Greek of his teacher, Stephen of Mar Saba. It emphasises Stephen's asceticism and thaumaturgy (miracle-working), but is also a rich source for the history of Palestine in the eighth century. It has been translated into English.

== Life ==
Leontius was born in Damascus in the second half of the eighth century. All that is known about him comes from the autobiographical account he includes in his biography of Stephen. Sometime before 790, he entered the Melkite monastery of Mar Saba. After suffering blasphemous thoughts for two years, which he attributes to a demon, he was healed and even saved from suicide by the spiritual tutelage of Stephen. Stephen later also healed him from a high fever.

Stephen eventually accepted Leontius as his disciple and the two wandered the Judaean Desert for four years, Leontius noting down Stephen's teachings. After Stephen's death on 31 March 794, Leontius wrote a biography of his master, including stories he had collected about his life, the teachings he had recorded himself and various miracles he attributed to Stephen.

Leontius died, possibly at Mar Saba, in the first half of the ninth century.

== Works ==
Leontius wrote his biography of Stephen in Greek between 794 and 821. The complete text in Greek does not survive; the first part is missing. The complete text is known only from an Arabic translation made from the Greek by Anbā Yanna ibn Iṣṭafān al-Fākhūrī at Mar Saba in March 903. It is largely a faithful translation.

The sole preserved Greek manuscript, MS Coislin Gr. 303, dates to the tenth century and is missing the first few quires, containing about a fifth of the work, including the original title. It was re-copied in 1662 by Daniel Papebroch. The Arabic version survives in two thirteenth-century manuscripts, one dated 1238. There is also a fragmentary Georgian translation made from the Arabic by John Zosimus in the tenth century. Both the Georgian and Arabic texts were discovered by Gérard Garitte at Saint Catherine's Monastery on Sinai in the 1950s. Since then, three Arabic fragments have been found, one from the tenth century and two from the sixteenth, including one dated 1536. A Latin translation of the Greek appeared in the Acta Sanctorum in 1723. Garitte translated the missing portion from Arabic into Latin in 1959. A full Italian translation from the Arabic was published by Bartolomeo Pirone in 1991, followed by John Lamoreaux's English translation in 1999.

One passage of the work, "On the All-Night Vigils", is found in the Georgian and two of the Arabic fragments, as well as a nineteenth-century Arabic manuscript in Garshuni script. This popular passage was translated into Old Church Slavonic no later than the fifteenth century. It survives in at least seven Slavonic manuscripts. In the Georgian and Arabic tradition it is attributed to Stephen of Mar Saba, but in the Slavonic it is misattributed to Stephen of Thebes.

The title of Leontius' biography in the Arabic manuscripts is The Life and Conduct of Our Holy Father, the Pure and Upright Mar Stephen, the Virtuous Anchorite Who Dwelt in the Lavra of Our Father Mar Sabas. It is a valuable historical source on Palestinian Christianity, the Holy Land pilgrimage and Christian–Muslim relations under the early Abbasid Caliphate. Leontius was an eyewitness to many events he records. He mentions the Bedouin sack of Mar Saba shortly after Stephen's death, which he witnessed. He portrays the tax on Christians, the jizya, as a severe burden that could even lead to apostasy.

At the centre of the Life are more than eighty miracles performed by Stephen. He records one instance in which a Muslim converted to Christianity after witnessing a miraculous healing by Stephen. Although the miracles are typically downplayed by modern scholars more interested in the details of daily life among the Melkite monastics of Islamic Palestine, they formed the core story for Leontius and his original audience. The miracles demonstrated the superiority and correctness of Melkite belief as against Monophysitism and Islam. Referring to the decline of monasticism that occurred in the wake of "great earthquake", he also openly addresses the question whether it is better to be a Christian in the world or a monk in the desert in his day.

Leontius uses Byzantine anno mundi dates.

== Editions ==
- The Life of Stephen of Mar Sabas. Arabic edition with English translation by John C. Lamoreaux. Corpus Scriptorum Christianorum Orientalium, Vols. 578–579 (Scriptores Arabici 50–51). Louvain: Peeters, 1999.
