= Monastery of Euthymius =

Monastery founded by Saint Euthymius the Great, later used as an inn

- Khan el-Ahmar ("Red Caravanserai")
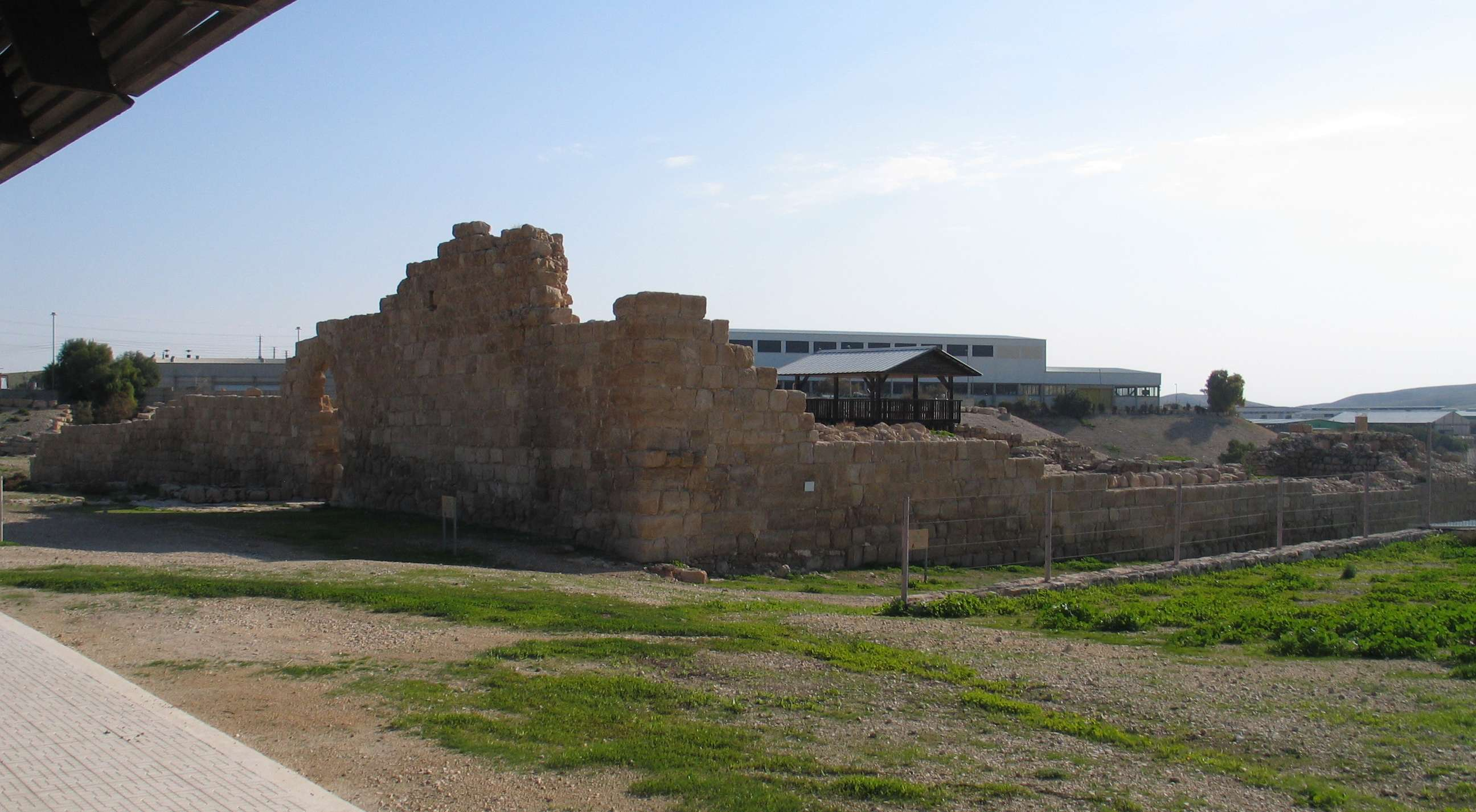
- The Monastery of Euthymius/Khan el-Ahmar

- Location within State of Palestine

General information
- Architectural style: Byzantine; Romanesque
- Coordinates: 31°47′32″N 35°20′10″E
- Palestine grid: 1819/1332 􏱮􏱱􏱮􏱲􏱬􏱮􏱯􏱯􏱴􏱮􏱱􏱮􏱲􏱬􏱮􏱯􏱯􏱴

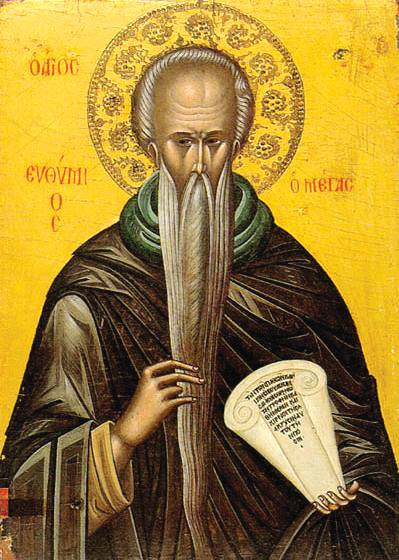
Icon of St. Euthymius

The Monastery of Euthymius started as a lavra-type monastic settlement in the Judaean desert, founded by Saint Euthymius the Great (377–473) in 420, known as the Laura or Lavra of Euthymius. After its final abandonment in the 13th century, it was repurposed as a caravanserai and became known as Khan el-Ahmar, the Red Caravanserai, khan being an originally Persian word for inn or caravanserai. Its ruins still stand a short distance south of today's main Jerusalem-Jericho highway in the West Bank.

It should not be confused with the nearby Khan al-Hatruri, better known to visitors as the Good Samaritan Inn, which sometimes also used to be called Khan al-Ahmar.

== Monastery ==
=== Lavra of St Euthymius (428-473) ===
The church was consecrated by Juvenal, Bishop of Jerusalem on 7 May 428. The lavra, a cluster of cells for hermits around a church, was located in Adummim on the road from Jericho to Jerusalem and was based on the layout of the Pharan lavra, with small cells. The vita of the founder, also known as Euthymius of Lesser Armenia, mentions him living his first years as a monk in the Holy Land (406–11) at Pharan.

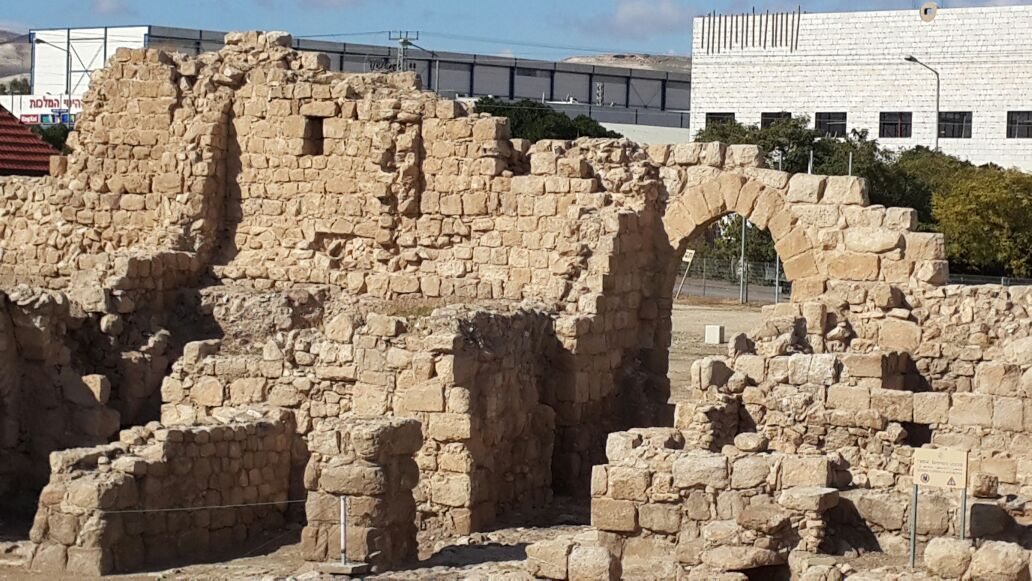
Present day archaeological site of Euthymius Monastery.

=== Byzantine cenobium after Euthymius ===
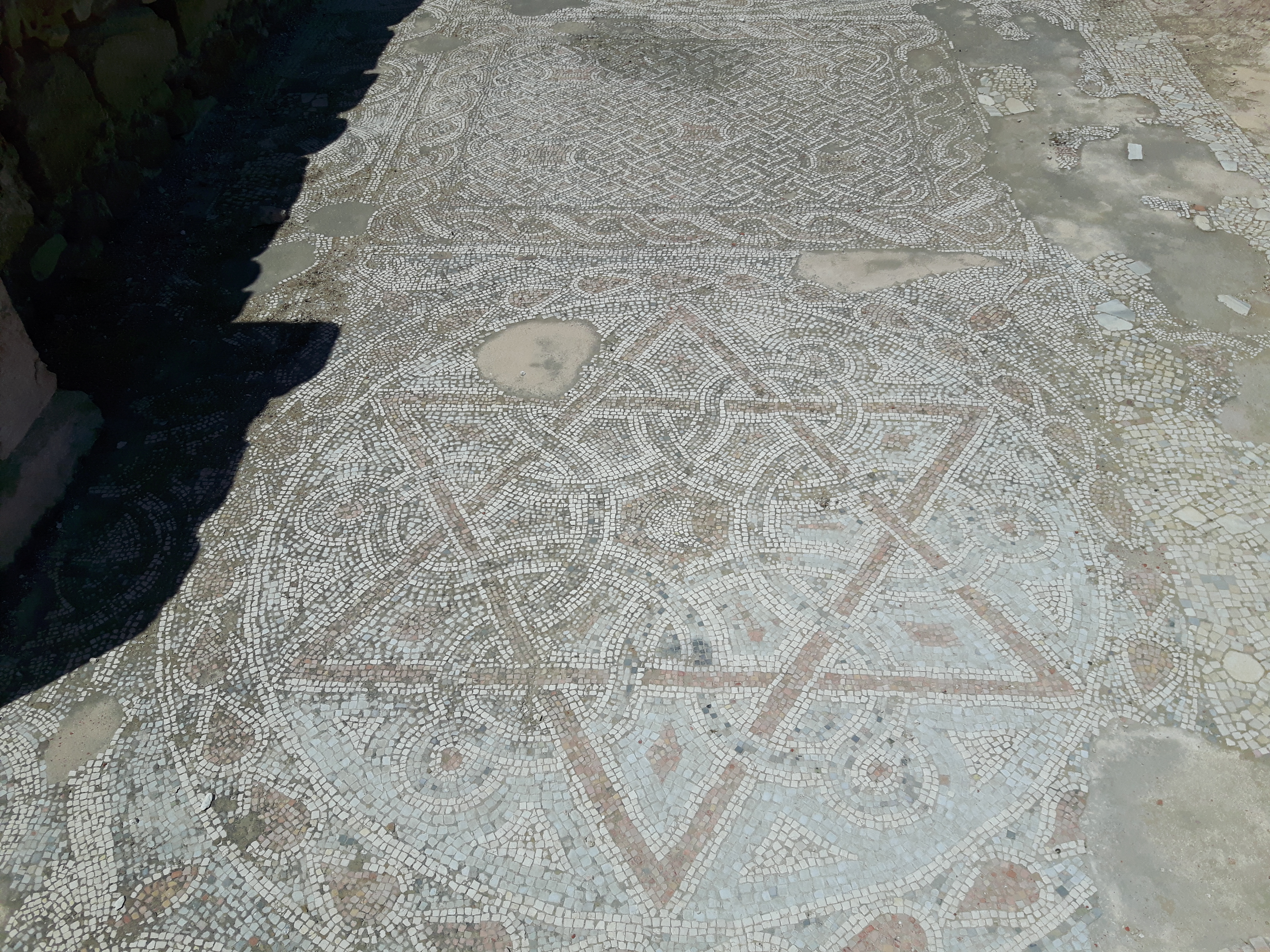
Star of David mosaic on the monastery floor

Following the death of Euthymius on 20 January 473 the church was converted to a refectory and a new church and cenobium were built above it. The cenobium was the area that novitiate monks would receive training prior to admittance to a lavra of the Sabaite tradition. The new church was consecrated by Martyrius, Patriarch of Jerusalem, in 482 and the site thereafter became known as the Monastery of St. Euthymius.

=== Early Muslim period ===
The lavra, ruined by an earthquake in 660, was rebuilt in a similar manner. Ancient testimonies speak of a Bedouin attack on the monastery in 796/97 as part of a series of such attacks against monasteries in Jerusalem and the Judean desert at the end of the 8th and beginning of the 9th century, but archaeology in general tends to paint a picture of peaceful abandonment, rather than destruction brought about by man or nature.

=== Crusader period ===
In 1106 Abbot Daniel noted: "To the east of the laura of St. Saba, only behind the mountain, is the Monastery of St. Euthymius, three versts away, and there lies St. Euthymius, and many other holy fathers lie there, and their bodies are as those of living people. There is a little monastery on a level place, and about it are rocky mountains some distance off. The monastery was established with a surrounding wall and the church was elevated. And there is quite close to it the Monastery of St. Theoctistus, under the mountain only half a day's walk from the Monastery of Euthymius, and all this has been destroyed now by pagans".

The monastic complex went through a massive restoration and construction phase in the 12th century during the Crusader period, but was finally abandoned in the next century.

== Significance of the laura ==
The laura of Euthymius was essential in the advancement and organisation of the Sabaite (desert monastic) movement, and, as the only dyophysite monastery in the Judaean desert at the time of the Council of Chalcedon (451), was central to the development of Chalcedonian orthodoxy within Palestinian monasticism, in what was at first an almost completely anti-Chalcedonian, miaphysite Palestine.

== Caravanserai (Khan al-Ahmar) ==
=== Mamluk period ===
After the abandonment of the monastery in the 13th century, during the Mamluk period, the structures were converted during the same century into a travellers' inn, known as Khan al-Ahmar, the "Red Khan", a caravanserai for Muslim pilgrims on the route between Jerusalem and Mecca via Nabi Musa. It should not be confused with nearby Khan al-Hatruri (aka Inn of the Good Samaritan), sometimes referred to as Khan al-Ahmar as well.

=== Ottoman period ===
The Rev. Haskett Smith guided European groups in Palestine in the late nineteenth century and edited the 1892 Murray's Handbooks for Travellers to Syria and Palestine. He recorded a visit to Khan al-Ahmar with a tour group journeying from Jerusalem to Jericho in his 1906 travelogue Patrollers of Palestine:

The entrance was through a wide archway in the side nearest to the road, and this archway opened into a covered courtyard with two similar arches at the further end, and doors leading into chambers on either side. Beyond the covered court was a spacious open square, surrounded on three sides by the high walls of the khan, and on the fourth bounded by the chambers and the court. A man in native costume was at one corner of the covered court, making coffee over a charcoal brazier, and at the same time filling and preparing a narghileh. There were several of these narghileh pipes arranged on a shelf near the brazier. The man was the innkeeper, or, as he is known by the natives, the khanidjeh. A few muleteers and other wayfarers were squatting or lying on the floor of the court, and some horses and mules were tethered in the open square within.

== Access and tourism ==
The site is east of Mishor Adumim, the industrial zone of Ma'ale Adumim, and is accessible to visit.

== See also ==
- Monastery of Martyrius, a ruined Byzantine monastery in nearby Ma'ale Adumim
- Mar Saba, the Holy Lavra of Saint Sabbas, a related Byzantine monastery (still working), also in the Judaean desert

== Bibliography ==
- Abbot Daniel (1889). "Vie et pèlerinage de Daniel, hégoumène russe (1106-1107): Du couvent de Saint-Euthyme" [Life and pilgrimage of Daniel, Russian abbot (1106-1107): The Monastery of Saint Euthymius]. Itinéraires russes en Orient [Russian Orient Travels] (in French). Vol. I, i. Translated by B. de Khitrowo. Geneva: Imprimerie Jules-Guillaume Fick for the Société de l'Orient Latin. p. 35.
- Conder, C.R.; Kitchener, H.H. (1883). The Survey of Western Palestine: Memoirs of the Topography, Orography, Hydrography, and Archaeology. Vol. 3. London: Committee of the Palestine Exploration Fund. (p. 207)
- Chitty, D. J. (July 1928). "Two Monasteries in the Wilderness of Judaea". Quarterly Statement. 60 (1). London: Palestine Exploration Fund (PEF): 134–152 (138).
- Chitty, D. J.; Jones, A.H.M. (October 1928). "The Church of St. Euthymius at Khan el-Ahmar, Near Jerusalem". Quarterly Statement. 60 (4). PEF: 175–179. doi:10.1179/peq.1928.60.4.175.
- Chitty, D. J. (1932). "The Monastery of St. Euthymius". Quarterly Statement. 64 (4). PEF: 188–203. doi:10.1179/peq.1932.64.4.188.
- Hirschfeld, Y. (1993). "Euthymius and his monastery in the Judean desert" (PDF). LA. 43: 339–371. Archived from the original (PDF) on 2017-06-17.
- Murphy-O'Connor, J. (2008). The Holy Land: An Oxford Archaeological Guide from Earliest Times to 1700. Oxford University Press. p. 335. ISBN 978-0-19-923666-4.
- Patrich, Joseph (1995). Sabas, Leader of Palestinian Monasticism: A Comparative Study in Eastern Monasticism, Fourth to Seventh Centuries. Dumbarton Oaks. pp. 265–266. ISBN 0-88402-221-8.
- Patrich, Joseph, ed. (2001). The Sabaite Heritage in the Orthodox Church from the Fifth Century to the Present. Orientalia Lovaniensia analecta. Vol. 98. Peeters Publishers. ISBN 90-429-0976-5.
  - Hirschfeld, Yizhar (2001). The Physical Structure of the New Laura as an Expression of Controversy over the Monastic Lifestyle. p. 323-346 [342].
  - Levy-Rubin, Milka (2001). The Role of the Judaean Desert Monasteries in the Monothelite Controversy in Seventh-Century Palestine. p. 283-300 [289].
- Pringle, D. (1998). The Churches of the Crusader Kingdom of Jerusalem: L-Z (excluding Tyre). Vol. II. Cambridge University Press. pp. 229-238. ISBN 978-0-521-39037-8.
- Smith, Haskett (1906). Patrollers of Palestine. p. 290.
