= Otreius of Melitene =

Otreius of Melitene (fl. late 4th century) was a Chalcedonian bishop of Melitene. He was one of three named by an edict of Theodosius I (30 July 381; Cod. Theod., LXVI, tit. I., L. 3) to episcopal sees named as centres of Catholic communion in the East, along with Gregory of Nyssa and Helladius of Caesarea.
