= Theoctistus of Palestine =

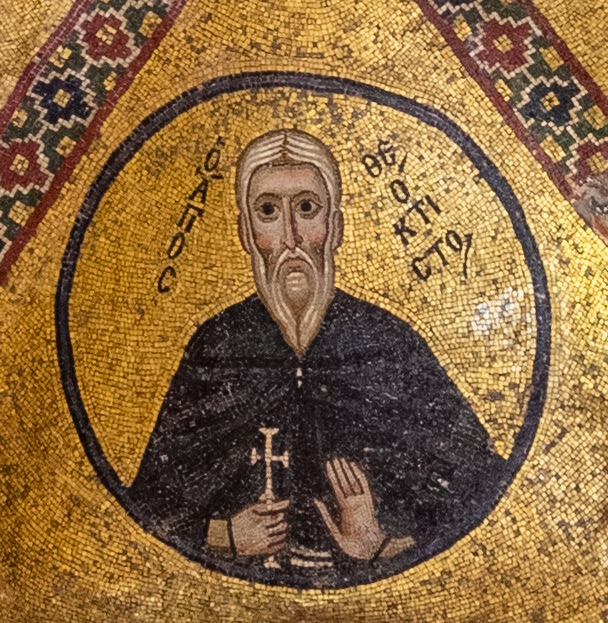

Venerable Theoctistus/Theoktistos of Palestine, also Abba Theoktistus/Theoktistos (died 451), was an associate of Euthymius the Great. He was an ascetic who lived in a cell at the Pharan lavra, not far from the main monastery established by Euthymius, and later became hegumen (abbot) of another monastery of the Judaean Desert, which became named after him.

== Ascetic life ==
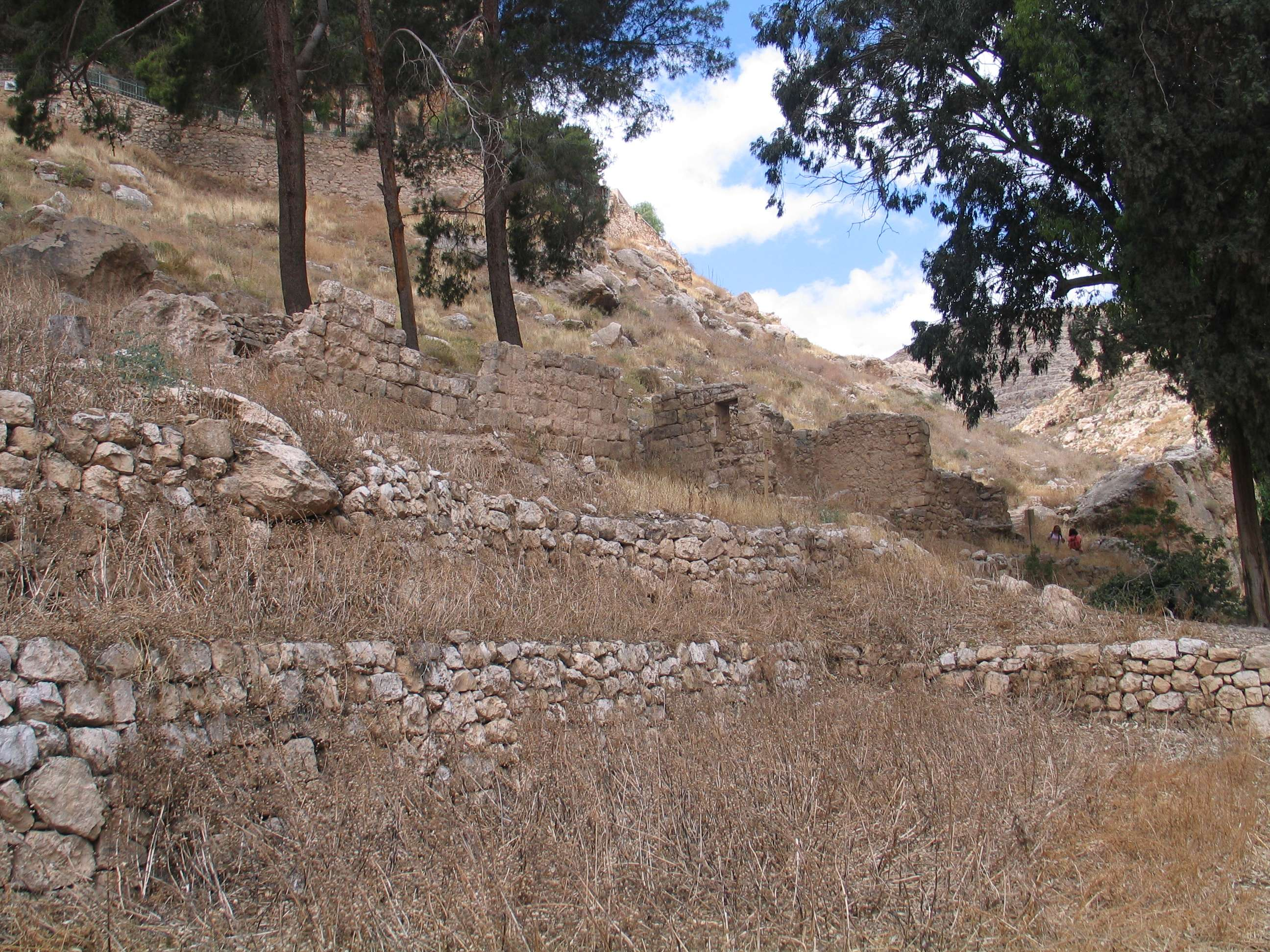
Remains of Faran/Pharan monastery

Euthymius and Theoctistus sought challenge and solitude in the desert each year after the Leave-taking of Theophany (the last day of the feast associated with the Baptism of Jesus), only returning to their hermitages on Palm Sunday. Five years into their association, they went into the desert for Great Lent, and found in a wadi (see Wadi Mukallik/Nahal Og) a large cave where they remained praying for some time. Eventually, shepherds from Bethany discovered them, and people from the area began to visit seeking spiritual guidance and bringing food. The monks then built a church. When other monks came seeking instruction, Euthymius and Theoctistus built a lavra over the cave church. Theoctistus became hegumen of the monastery.

Euthymius is credited with establishing several monasteries, including that of Theoctistus.

== Death and commemoration ==
Theoctistus died at an advanced age in 451 and is commemorated on 3 September.
