= Helladius of Caesarea =

Helladius of Caesarea (Greek: Έλλάδιος Καισαρείας) was a bishop of Caesarea. He was one of three named by an edict of Theodosius I (30 July 381; Cod. Theod., LXVI, tit. I., L. 3) to episcopal sees named as centres of Catholic communion in the East, along with Gregory of Nyssa and Otreius of Melitene.
