= Theognius of Bethany =

Saint Theognius of Bethany

Venerable, Monk
- Born: 425; Cappadocia
- Died: 522/523; Palestine
- Venerated in: Catholic Church; Eastern Orthodox Church
- Feast: January 11

Saint Theognios (425–522 or 523) was a late antique monk venerated as a saint.

== Life ==
He was of Cappadocian origin. In his youth he became a monk and moved to the Gethsemane monastery in Jerusalem. When he was entrusted with leadership, he carried out his duties with wisdom. Later he withdrew to a lake near the Jordan River. He is venerated as a saint in Eastern Orthodox Christianity, and his memory is commemorated on February 8 and February 15.

He died on age c. 97 in 522 or 523.

His biography was written by Cyril of Scythopolis.

== Sources ==
- Saint Théognios, Evêque de Béthanie, moine en Palestine (✝ 523)
- V., S. (1898). "Saint Théognius, évêque de Béthélie (425-522) - Persée". persee.fr. pp. 380–382. doi:10.3406/rebyz.1898.3181.
- "Bonjour". bonjour.credot.eu. Archived from the original on 2018-07-14.
