= Mar Saba =

Greek Orthodox monastery in the West Bank

Coordinates: 31°42′18″N 35°19′52″E

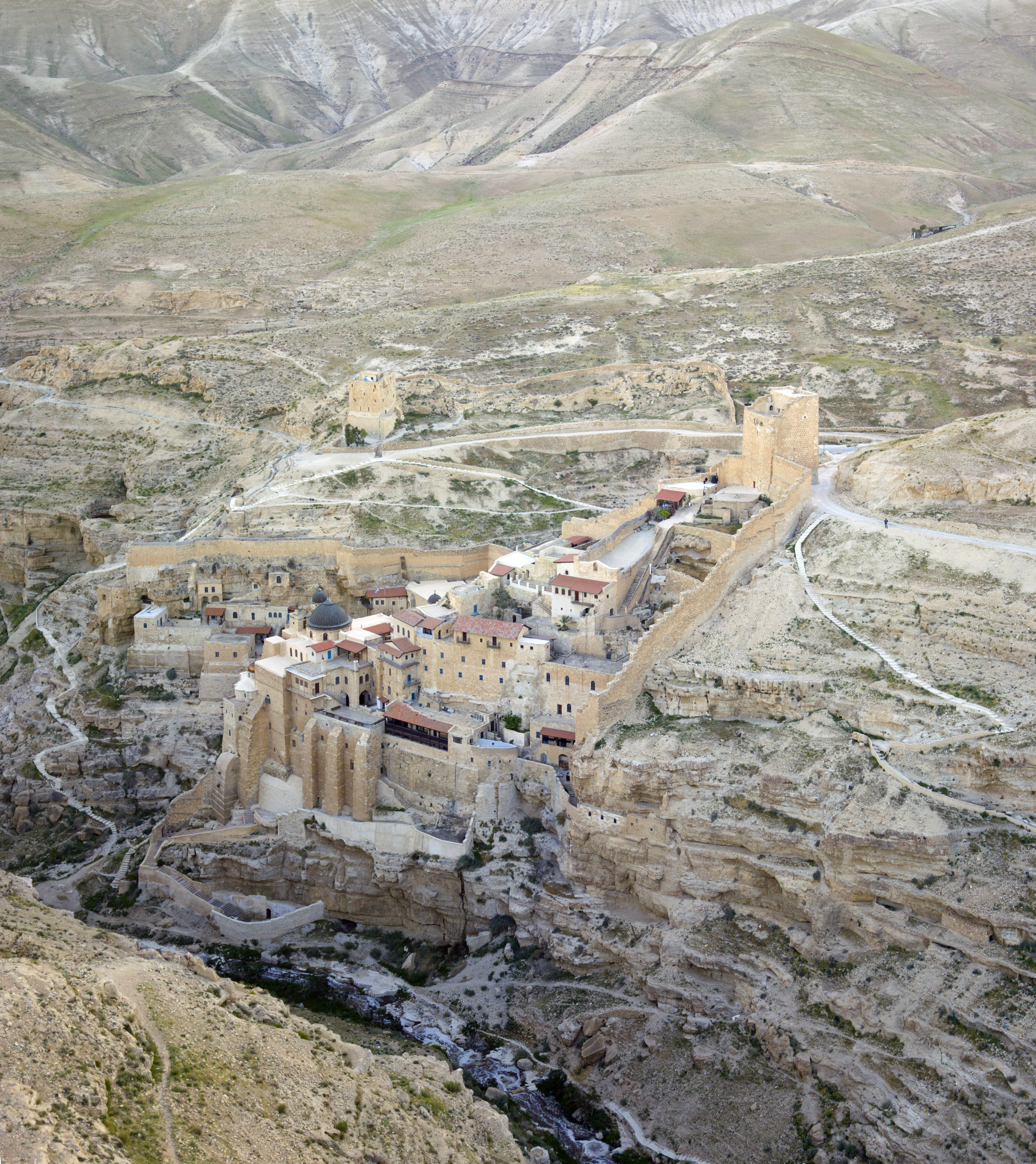
Mar Saba seen from the air

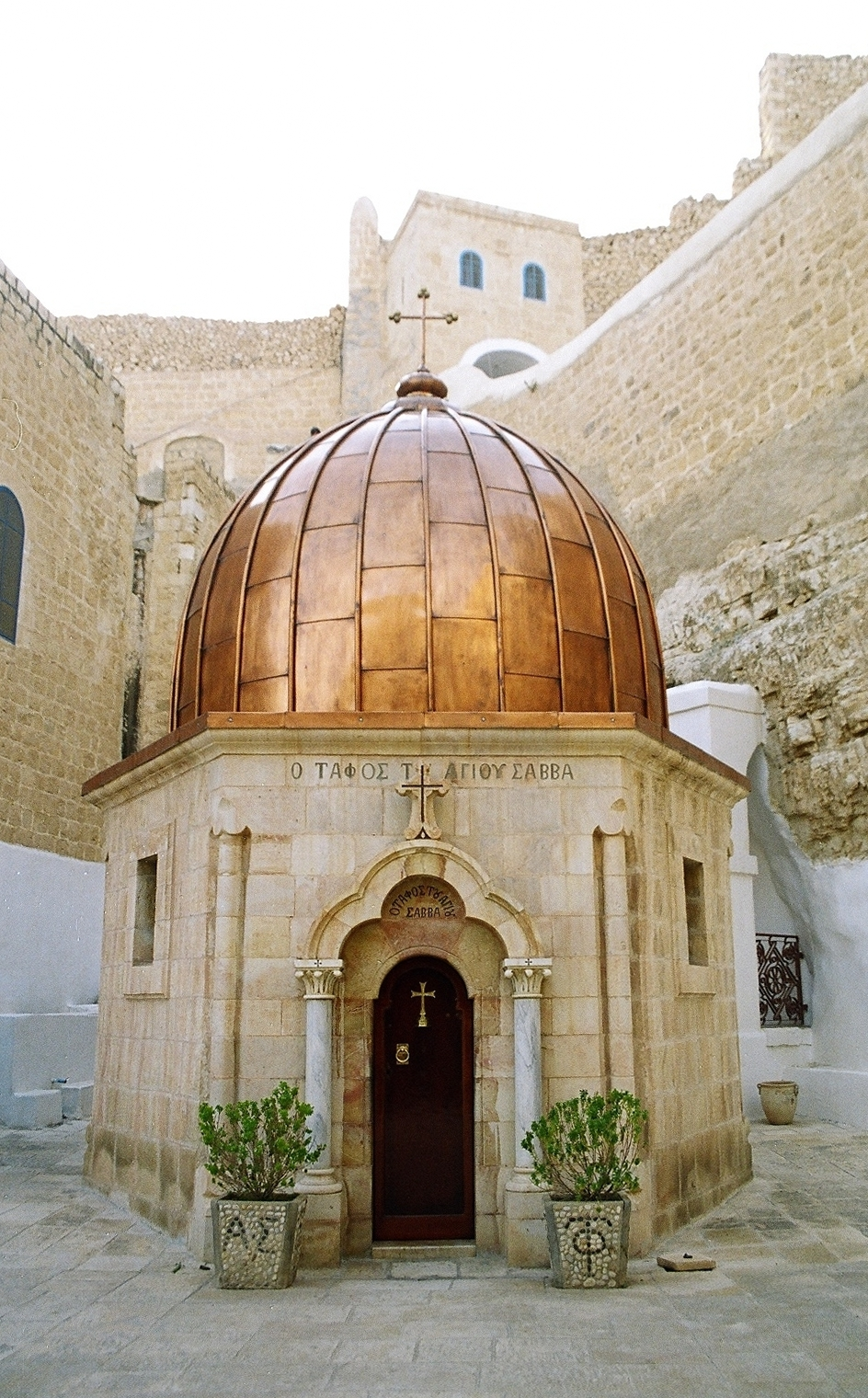
Tomb of Saint Sabbas

The Holy Lavra of Saint Sabbas (Greek: Ἱερὰ Λαύρα τοῦ Ὁσίου Σάββα τοῦ Ἡγιασμένου, romanized: Yerá Lávra tú Osíu Sávva tú Iyazménu), (Note: A lavra was historically a semi-eremitical monastic community, but most today only have the name for historical reasons and follow more centralized cenobitic monasticism.) known in Arabic and Syriac as Mar Saba (Syriac: ܕܝܪܐ ܕܡܪܝ ܣܒܐ, romanized: Dayrā d-Mār Sabba; Levantine Arabic: دير مار سابا, romanized: Dēr Mār Sābā; ) and historically as the Great Laura of Saint Sabas, is a Greek Orthodox Christian monastery overlooking the Kidron Valley in the Bethlehem Governorate of Palestine in the West Bank, at a point halfway between Bethlehem and the Dead Sea. The monks of Mar Saba and those of subsidiary houses are known as Sabaites.

Mar Saba is considered one of the world's oldest (almost) continuously inhabited monasteries, and it maintains many of its ancient traditions. One in particular is the restriction on women entering the main compound. The only building women can enter is the Women's Tower, near the main entrance.

== History ==
=== Byzantine period ===
The monastery was founded by Sabbas the Sanctified in 483 on the eastern side of the Kidron Valley, where, according to the monastery's website, the first seventy hermits gathered around the hermitage of St Sabbas. Later on, the laura relocated to the opposite, western side of the gorge, where the Church of Theoktistos was built in 486 and consecrated in 491 (today rededicated to Saint Nicholas). The constant growth of the community meant that soon after, in 502, the Church of the Theotokos was built to serve as the monastery's main church. Sabbas' typikon, the set of rules applied at the Great Laura and recorded by the saint, eventually became the worldwide model of monastic life and liturgical order known as the Byzantine Rite.

==== St John of Damascus ====
Mar Saba was the home of John of Damascus (676–749; Arabic: يوحنا الدمشقي, romanized: Yūḥana ad-Dimashqī), a key figure in the First Iconoclastic Controversy, who, around 726, wrote letters to the Byzantine emperor Leo III the Isaurian refuting his edicts prohibiting the veneration of icons (images of Christ or other religious figures). Born to a prominent Damascene political family, John worked as a high financial officer to the Umayyad caliph Abd al-Malik ibn Marwan; he eventually felt a higher calling and migrated to the Judaean Desert, where he was tonsured and was ordained a hieromonk (monastic priest) at the Lavra of Mar Saba. John's tomb lies in a cave under the monastery.

=== Early Muslim period ===
Ancient sources describe an Arab attack on the monastery in 797, leading to the massacre of twenty monks. Between the late eighth to the tenth century, the monastery was a major translation center for Greek works into Arabic. For instance, Yannah ibn Istifan al-Fakhuri (fl. 910) translated works of Leontius of Damascus and Barsanuphius of Gaza. Mar Saba was the home of the famous Georgian monk and scribe John Zosimus, who moved before 973 to Saint Catherine's Monastery, taking several parchment manuscripts with him.

The community seems to have also suffered under the persecutions of non-Muslims of the Fatimid caliph al-Hakim bi-Amr Allah in 1009 as well as Turkmen raids in the 11th century, but experienced occasional phases of peace as can be seen by the continued scribal and artistic activities.

=== Crusader period ===
The monastery kept its importance during the existence of the Catholic Kingdom of Jerusalem established by Crusaders in 1099.

=== Mamluk and Ottoman periods ===
Like the other Palestinian monasteries, the monastery experienced a period of decline in the late medieval period as a result of Mamluk persecutions, the Black Death, demographic and economic degradation and the expansion of nomadic tribes. Whereas the Russian monk Zosimas estimated in 1420 the number of inhabitants at 30, the German traveler Felix Fabri recorded in the early 1480s, only six who were living together with a group of nomadic Arabs. Thereafter, the monastery was abandoned, and the remaining monks seem to have moved to Saint Catherine's Monastery in the Sinai.

In 1504, the Serbian monastic community of Palestine, based out of the fourteenth century Monastery of Holy Archangels, purchased Mar Saba. The Serbs controlled the monastery until the late 1630s, and the significant financial support the monastery received from the Tsar of the Russian Empire allowed them to run the monastery semi-independently from the Patriarchate of Jerusalem, the monastery's nominal overseer (much to the vexation of the patriarchate). The Serbs' control of Mar Saba allowed them to play an important role in the politics of the Orthodox Church of Jerusalem, often siding with the Arabic laity and priests against the Greeks who dominated the episcopate. Serbian control of the monastery eventually ended in the 1600s when the monastery got into massive debt due to the simultaneous combination of a massive building program at the monastery and a cutting off of financial support from Russia due to the outbreak of the Time of Troubles. The Serbs were forced to sell the monastery to the Patriarch of Jerusalem to pay off their debts.

== Significance ==
The monastery, considered among the oldest continuously inhabited in the Christian world, has been a place of learning and has exerted an essential influence in doctrinal developments in the Byzantine Church. Important personalities in this regard included Sabbas himself, John of Damascus (676–749), and the brothers Theodorus and Theophanes (770s–840s).

The monastery is vital in the historical development of the liturgy of the Eastern Orthodox Church, in that the monastic Typikon (manner of celebrating worship services) of Sabbas became the standard throughout the Church and in those Eastern Catholic Churches that follow the Byzantine Rite. The Typikon was adopted as the standard form of services celebrated in the Greek Orthodox Patriarchate of Jerusalem and added monastic usages that were local traditions at Saint Sabbas. From there it spread to Constantinople, and thence throughout the Byzantine world. Although this Typikon has undergone further evolution, particularly at the Monastery of Stoudios in Constantinople, it is still referred to as the Typikon of Saint Sabbas. A tradition states that this monastery will host the last Divine Liturgy on earth before the Second Coming, and thus it is the final pillar of Christianity.

=== Relics ===
The monastery holds the relics of Sabbas. The relics were seized by Latin Crusaders in the 12th century and remained in Italy until Pope Paul VI returned them to the monastery in 1965 as a gesture of repentance and goodwill towards Orthodox Christians.

=== Manuscripts ===
Morton Smith purportedly found a copy of the Mar Saba letter ascribed to Clement of Alexandria containing excerpts of a so-called Secret Gospel of Mark, and was for several centuries home to the Archimedes Palimpsest.

== Access ==
Women are allowed to come to the main entrance, but they are not allowed to enter the walled compound.

The monastery is closed for visitors on Wednesdays and Fridays (the days of religious fasting).

== Gallery ==
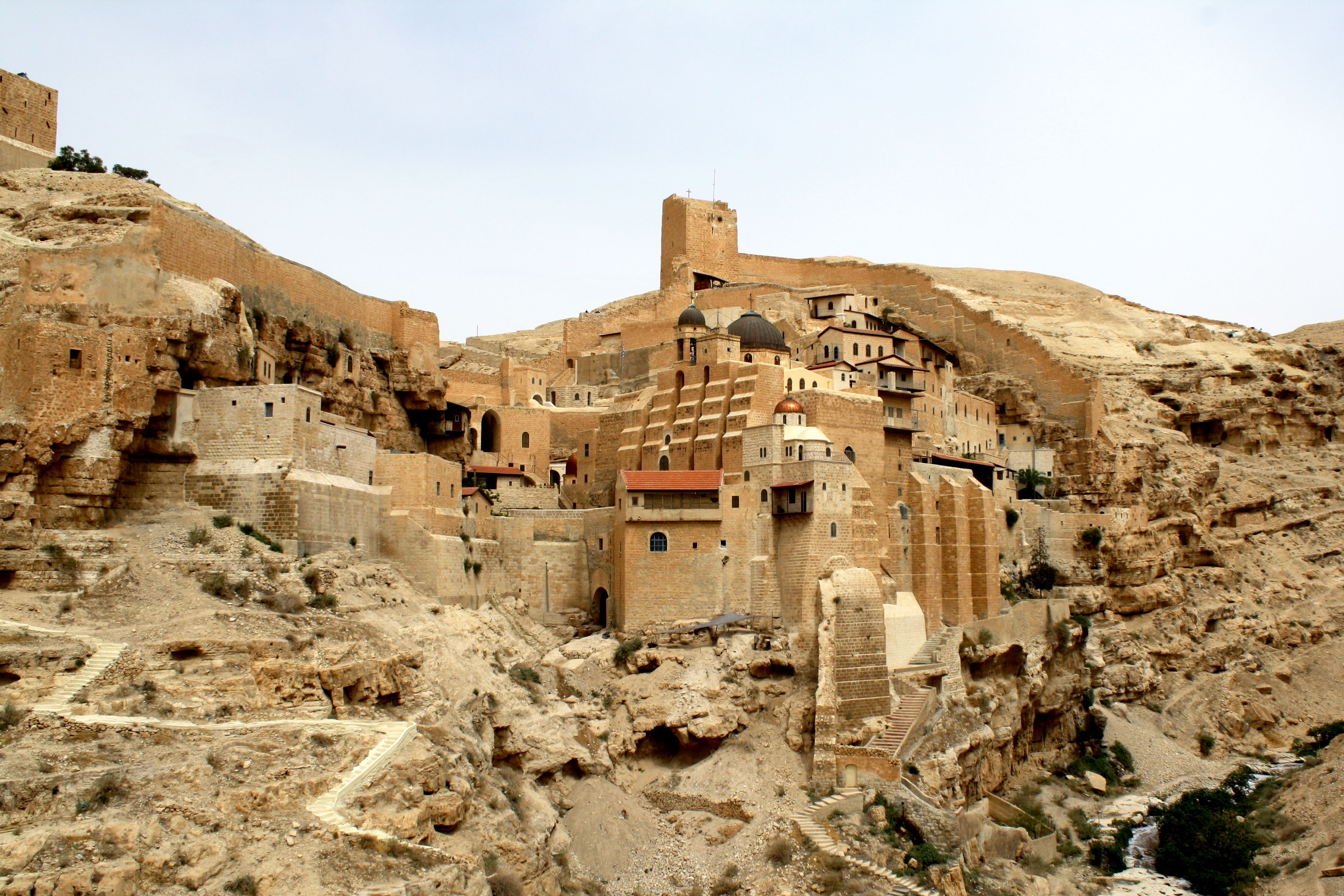
Mar Saba Monastery, 2011

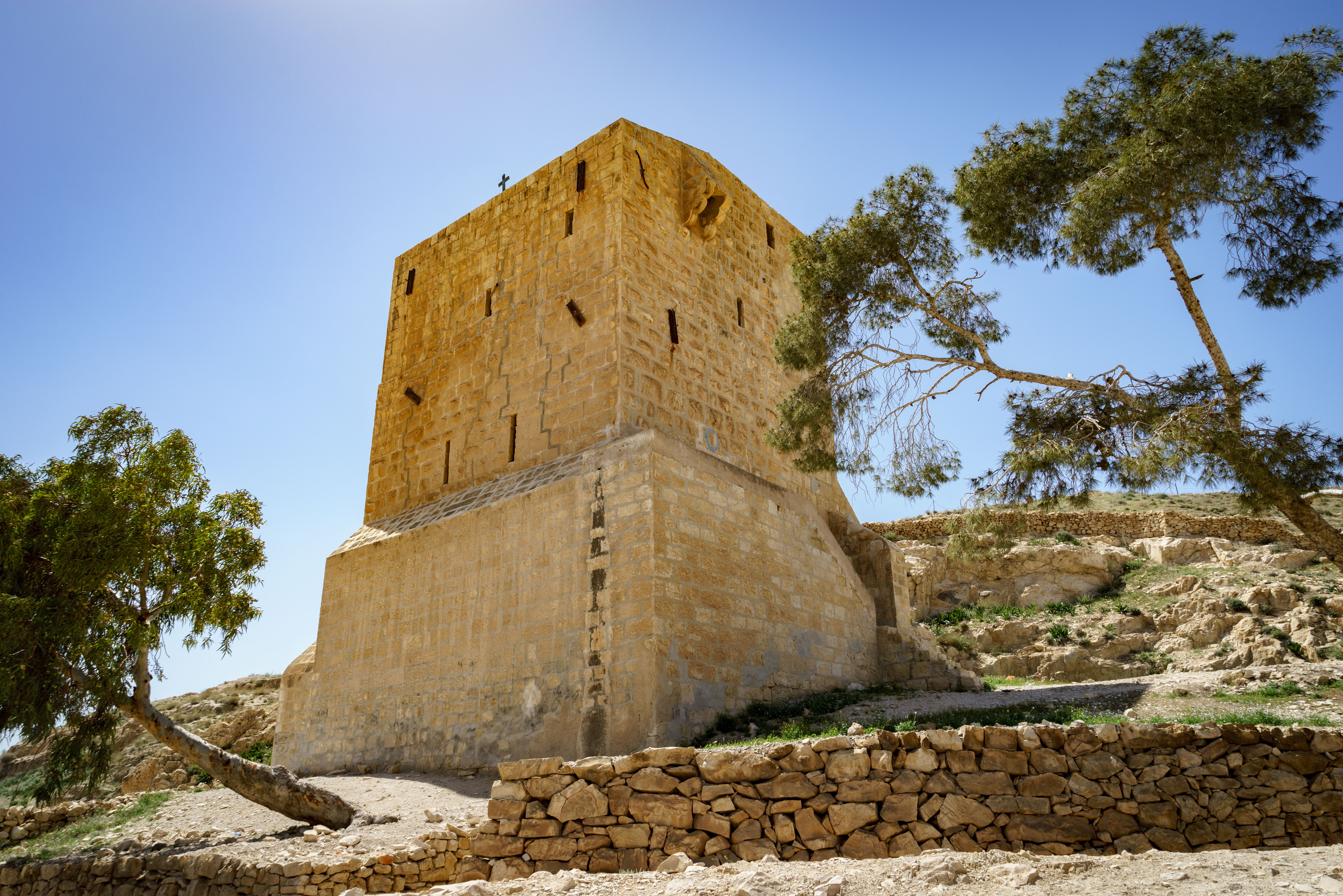
The Women's Tower at Mar Saba Monastery is the only building on the grounds that women are allowed to enter.

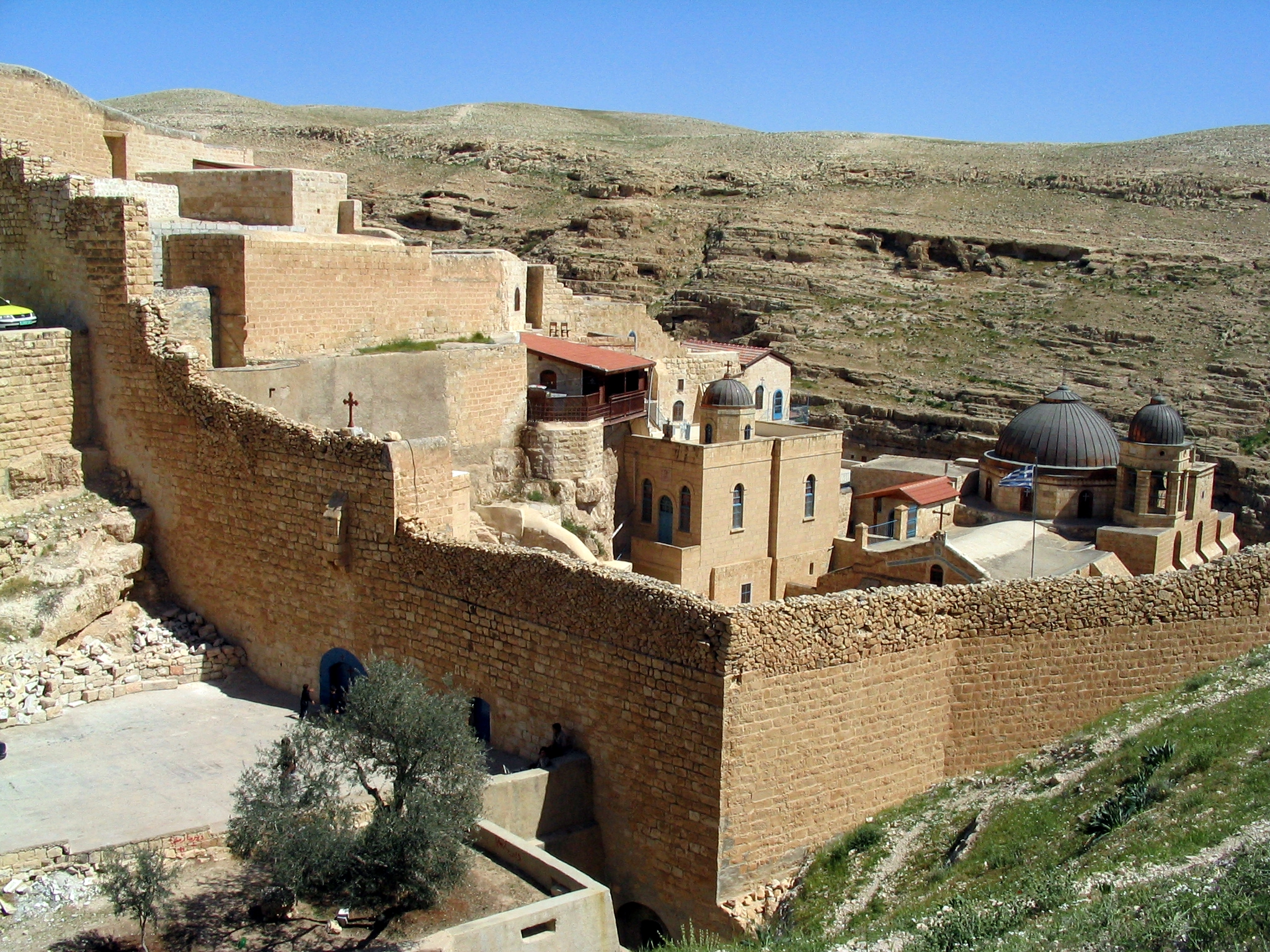
Mar Saba seen from a distance

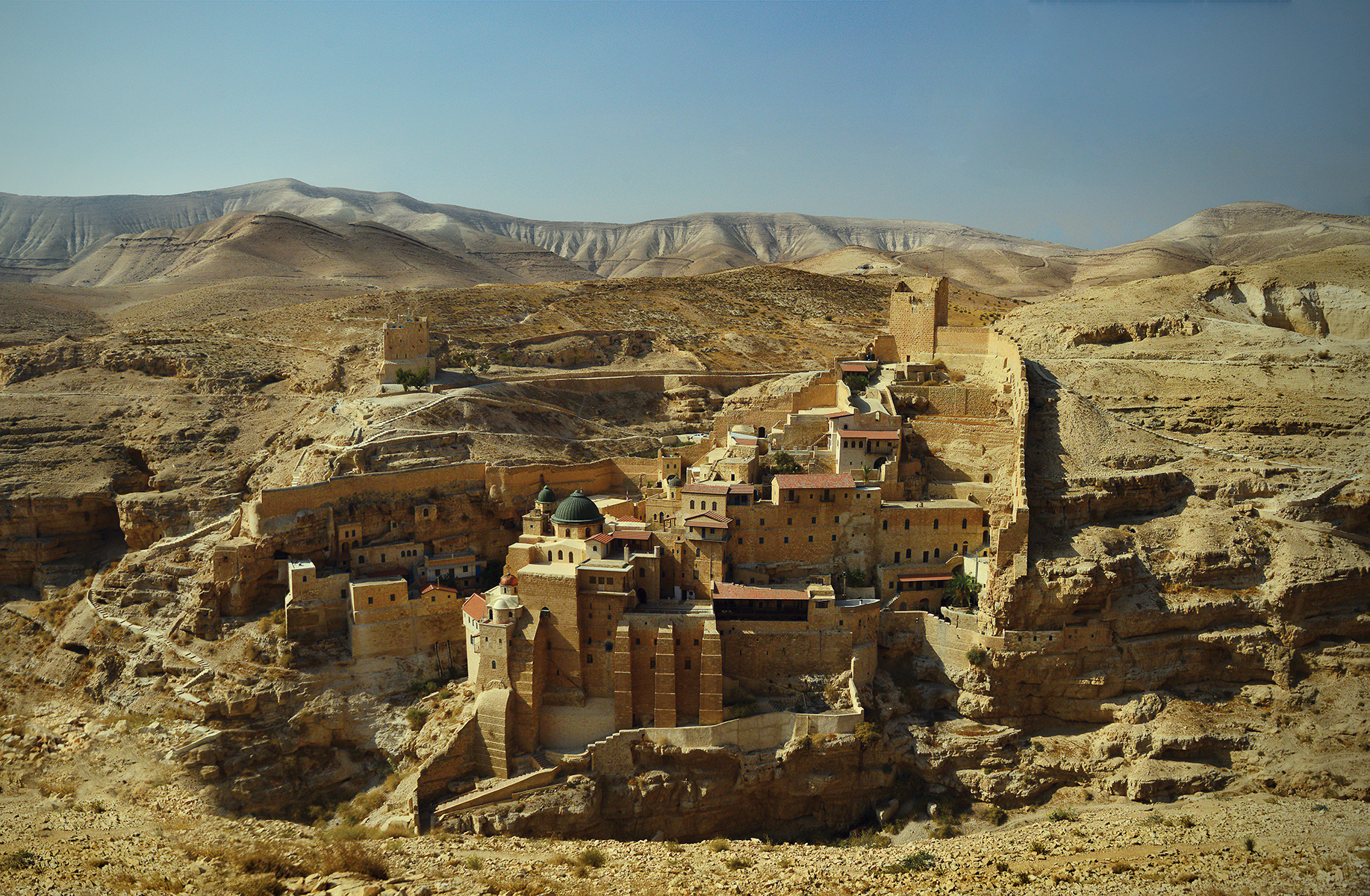
Mar Saba, in the Kidron Valley

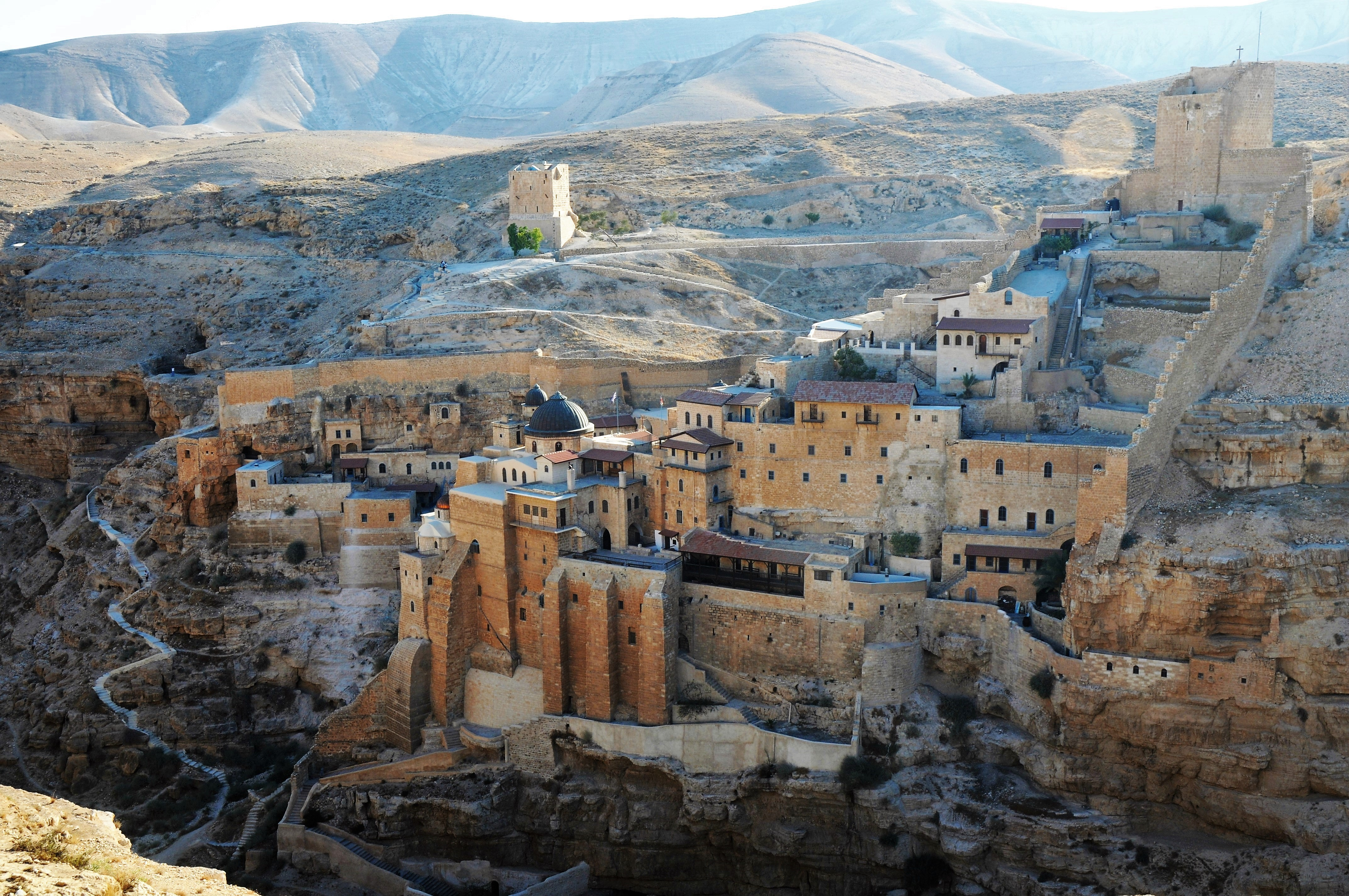

== List of abbots ==
There are gaps in this list. Prior to the 18th century, dates are years when the abbot (or hegumen) is known to have held office and not the start and end dates. From the 18th century on, the dates indicate the start of an abbot's term, which usually lasted two years at first, longer later on. The official list goes back to 1704, but still has gaps.

1. Sabas, 483–532
2. Melitas, 532–537
3. Gelasios, 537–546
4. George the Origenist, 547
5. Kassianos of Scythopolis, 547–548
6. Konon of Lycia, 548–568
7. Stephanos Trichinas
8. Nikomedes, 614 (Note: fled to Arabia during the Sasanian invasion)
9. Justinus, 614 (Note: abbot of the community in the monastery of Saint Anastasius)
10. Thomas, 614 (Note: abbot of those who returned)
11. John, c. 649
12. Nikodemus, 8th century (Note: under him John of Damascus and Cosmas of Maiuma joined the community)
13. Strategios
14. Basil, 797–809 (Note: witnessed the martyrdom of the twenty monks in 797 and corresponded with Theodore of Stoudios in 809)
15. John, 808–825
16. David, mid–9th century (Note: sent out George, one of the martyrs of Córdoba)
17. Solomon, 864
18. Paul, 962
19. Ioannikios, 1071–1072
20. Mark, first half of the 11th century
21. Mark Makrinos
22. Arsenios, 12th century
23. Basil, 12th century
24. Basil, 12th century
25. Miletus (Meletios), 1163–1164
26. Sabas, before 1187
27. Nicholas, 1229 (Note: hosted Saint Sava)
28. Ioannikios, 1334
29. Mark, before c. 1370 (Note: bishop of Damascus in the 1370s)
30. Stephen, 1370s (Note: abbot during the visit of Agrefeny)
31. Pachomius, 15th century (Note: abbot of the Serbian community)
32. Maximos Oikonomos, 1533–1534
33. Joachim the Wallachian, 1540–1547 (Note: resettled the monastery with 50 monks)
34. Germanos
35. Isaias, 1550
36. Nathanael, 1566
37. Pachomius, 1577–1578
38. Timothy, 1581
39. Athansios
40. Christophoros, 1593 (Note: abbot during the visit of Tryphon Korobeinikov)
41. Daniel, 1619
42. Galaktion, 1630
43. Neophytos, 1649
44. Daniel, c. 1672 (Note: signed the acts of the Synod of Jerusalem)
45. George of Chios, 1682
46. Nikeophoros of Cyprus, 1696
47. Gerasimos, 1704
48. Kallistos, 1705
49. Anthimos, 1707
50. Kallinikos, 1710
51. Gerasimos Oikonomos, 1714
52. Kyrillos, 1714
53. Ignatios, 1722
54. Iakobos, 1724
55. Neophytos of Smyrna, 1731
56. Parthenios of Constantinople, 1732
57. Meletios, 1733
58. Anthimos Anatolites, 1740
59. Symeon Baskopolites, 1744
60. Gennadios of Ioannina, 1745
61. Daniel Moutaniotes, 1747
62. Ananias Anatolites, 1749
63. Kyrillos of Amaseia, 1753
64. Ieremias, 1753
65. Nikephoros of Ioannina, 1754/5
66. Kyrillos, 1756
67. Amphilochios, 1757
68. Arsenios of Cyprus, 1758
69. Gabriel, 1759
70. Arsenios of Galatia, 1760
71. Raphael Anatolites, 1761/2
72. Meletios of Cyprus, 1763 (first term)
73. Arsenios, 1766
74. Silvestros Anatolites, 1767
75. Ioannikos, 1768
76. Meletios of Cyprus, 1769 (second term)
77. Gerasimos of Cyprus, 1770
78. Iakobos Boskopolites, 1772
79. Melechisedek of Cyprus, 1775
80. Seraphim Anatolites, 1777
81. Kallinikos Tseritsaniotes, 1778
82. Iakobos the Albanian, 1779
83. Parthenios of Chaldias, 1782
84. Melkisedek, 1786
85. Sophronios, 1788
86. Joachim of Cyprus, 1790
87. Dionysios Proussaeus, 1791
88. Anthimos of Philippopolis, 1792
89. Gregory of Kos, 1794
90. Michael of Cyprus, 18th century
91. Athanasios (second term)
92. Kallinikos, 1804 (first term)
93. Gabriel, 1806–1809
94. Athanasios, 1810 (third term)
95. Kallinikos, 1813 (second term)
96. Misael Petras, 1814
97. Paisios, 1817
98. Pankratios, 1818
99. Theodosios Skopianos, 1820
100. Agapios of Peloponnesos, 1832
101. Theophanes
102. Euthymios of Cyprus (first term)
103. Isaias, 1837
104. Euthymios of Cyprus, 1838 (second term)
105. Symeon, 1843 (first term)
106. Symeon, 1844 (second term)
107. Neophytos of Cyprus
108. Joasaph, 1845–1874
109. Anthimos, 1874
110. Silvestros of Leukas, 1918–1932
111. Nikolaos of Proussa, 1932–1937
112. Sabas of Elassona, 1937–1957
113. Seraphim of Kythira, 1957–2003
114. Eudokimos, 2003–

== See also ==
- War of Saint Sabas
- Serapheim Savvaitis
- Theodorus and Theophanes called the Grapti (770s–840s), monks educated at Mar Saba, opponents of iconoclasm

== Bibliography ==
- Conder, C.R.; Kitchener, H.H. (1883). The Survey of Western Palestine: Memoirs of the Topography, Orography, Hydrography, and Archaeology. Vol. 3. London: Committee of the Palestine Exploration Fund. (pp. 219, 232)
- Guérin, V. (1869). Description Géographique Historique et Archéologique de la Palestine (in French). Vol. 1: Judee, pt. 3. Paris: L'Imprimerie Nationale. (pp. 92- 101)
- Guérin, V. (1874). Description Géographique Historique et Archéologique de la Palestine (in French). Vol. 2: Samarie, pt. 1. Paris: L'Imprimerie Nationale. (pp. 14-19)
- Palmer, E.H. (1881). The Survey of Western Palestine: Arabic and English Name Lists Collected During the Survey by Lieutenants Conder and Kitchener, R. E. Transliterated and Explained by E.H. Palmer. Committee of the Palestine Exploration Fund. (p. 347)
- Pringle, D. (1998). The Churches of the Crusader Kingdom of Jerusalem: L-Z (excluding Tyre). Vol. II. Cambridge University Press. ISBN 0-521-39037-0. (pp. 258-268)
- Robinson, E.; Smith, E. (1841). Biblical Researches in Palestine, Mount Sinai and Arabia Petraea: A Journal of Travels in the year 1838. Vol. 2. Boston: Crocker & Brewster. (pp. 26, 249)
- Robinson, E.; Smith, E. (1841). Biblical Researches in Palestine, Mount Sinai and Arabia Petraea: A Journal of Travels in the year 1838. Vol. 3. Boston: Crocker & Brewster. (Robinson and Smith, 1841, vol 3, 2nd appendix, p. 123)
