= Sabbas the Sanctified =

Byzantine monk

Saint Sabbas the Sanctified
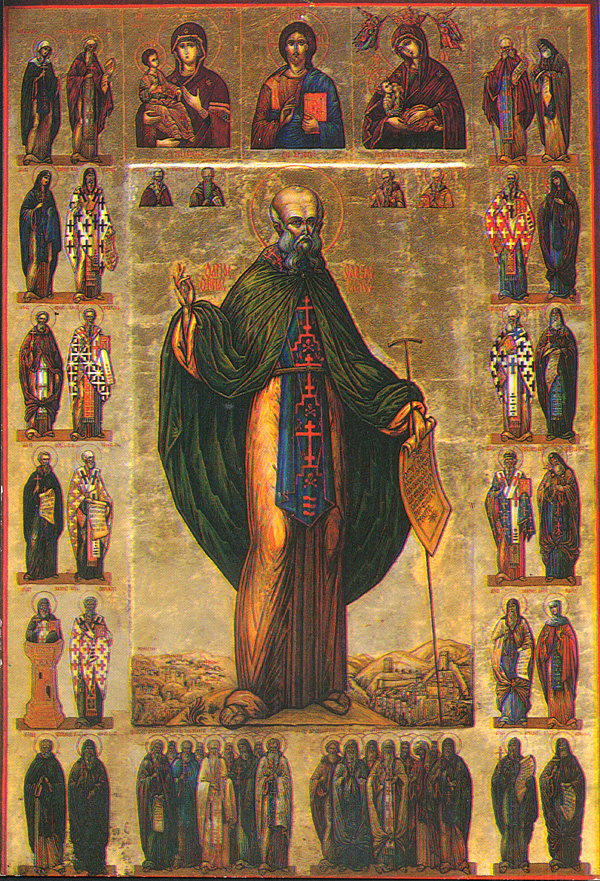
- Medieval icon of Saint Sabbas the Sanctified

Venerable Father; Abbot
- Born: 439; Caesarea Mazaca, Cappadocia, Eastern Roman Empire
- Died: December 5, 532; Jerusalem, Palaestina Prima, Eastern Roman Empire
- Venerated in: Eastern Orthodox Church; Catholic Church
- Major shrine: Saint Sabbas Monastery, Palestine
- Feast: December 5
- Attributes: an apple in his hand

Sabas (439–532), in Church parlance Saint Sabas or Sabbas the Sanctified (Greek: Σάββας ὁ Ἡγιασμένος), was a Cappadocian Greek monk, priest, grazer and saint, who was born in Cappadocia and lived mainly in Palaestina Prima. He was the founder of several convents, most notably the one known as Mar Saba, in Palestine. The saint's name is derived from סָבָא Sāḇāʾ "old man".

== Life ==
=== Early life ===
St Sabbas was born the son of John, a military commander, and Sophia, at Moutalaske near Caesarea of Cappadocia. The name of the village has no known meaning in Greek, but the Aramaic "Mata la zkha" translates as "Village of Victory".

Journeying to Alexandria on military matters, his parents left their five-year-old son in the care of an uncle. When the boy reached eight years of age, he entered the nearby monastery of Bishop Flavian of Antioch. The gifted child quickly learned to read and became an expert on the Holy Scriptures. Sabbas resisted his parents' pressure to return to the world and enter into marriage. When he was 17 years old he received monastic tonsure and subsequently spent ten years at the monastery of Bishop Flavian.

=== Holy Land: apprenticeship ===
After that, Sabbas went to Jerusalem, and from there to the monastery of Saint Euthymius the Great. But Euthymius sent Sabbas to Abba Theoctistus, the head of a nearby monastery with a strict cenobitic rule. Sabbas lived in obedience at this monastery until the age of thirty.

After the death of the Elder Theoctistus, his successor blessed Sabbas to seclude himself in a cave. On Saturdays, however, he left his hermitage and came to the monastery, where he participated in divine services and ate with the brethren. After a certain time Sabbas received permission not to leave his hermitage at all, and he lived in isolation in the cave for five years.

Euthymius attentively directed the life of the young monk, and seeing his spiritual maturity, he began to take him to the wilderness with him. They set out each January 14 and remained there until Palm Sunday. Euthymius called Sabbas a child-elder, and encouraged him to grow in the monastic virtues.

=== Hermit, founder of monasteries, Church leader ===
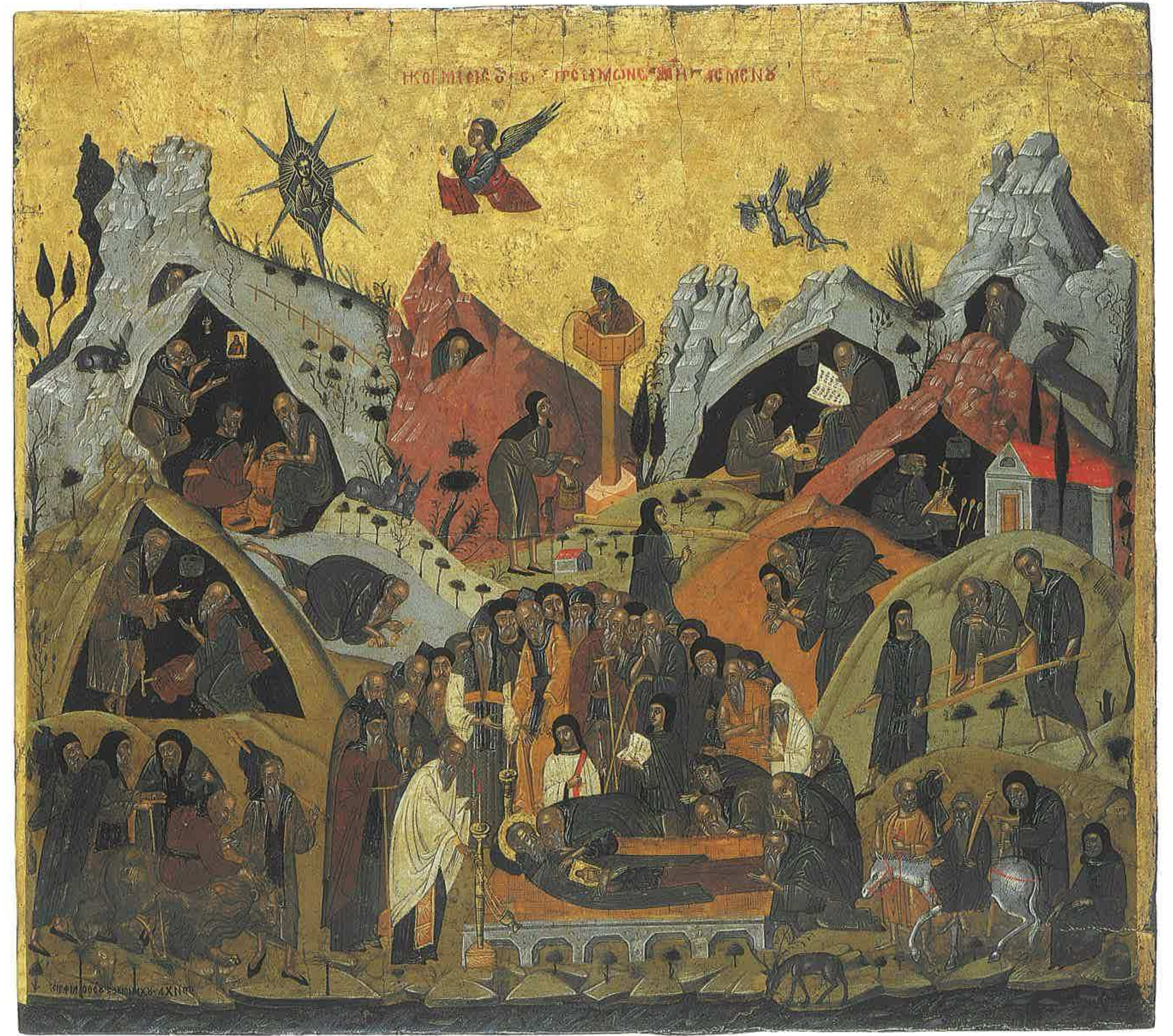
The Dormition of Sabbas the Sanctified with scenes from his life by Philotheos Skoufos, 1656

When Euthymius died (c. 473), Sabbas withdrew from the lavra (a cluster of cells or caves for hermits, with a church and sometimes a refectory at the center) and moved to a cave near the monastery of St Gerasimus of the Jordan. After several years, disciples began to gather around Sabbas, seeking the monastic life. As the number of monks increased, the Great Lavra sprang up. The traditional dating of the founding of this lavra in the Kidron Valley, south of Jerusalem, is 484. Because some of his monks opposed his rule and demanded a priest as their abbot, the opposition continued and he withdrew to the New Lavra, which he had built near Thekoa. In the lavras the young monks lived a cenobitic life, but the elders a semi-eremitical one, each in his own hut within the precincts of the lavra, attending only the solemn church services.

As a supporter of the Chalcedonian creed and strenuous opponent of the Monophysites and the Origenists, he tried to influence the emperors against them by calling personally on Emperor Anastasios I at Constantinople in 511 and on Justinian I in 531.

Sabbas founded several more monasteries. It is claimed that many miracles took place through the prayers of Sabbas: at the lavra a spring of water welled up, during a time of drought they received abundant rain, and there were also healings of the sick and the possessed.

After the death of the archimandrite Marcian around 491/92, the monks in the wilderness around Jerusalem went to patriarch Salustius of Jerusalem to ask to obtain Sabbas as archimandrite of the anchorites and cave-dwellers and Theodosius as archimandrite of all cenobitic living monks.

Sabbas composed the first monastic rule of church services, the so-called Jerusalem Typikon, for guidance of all the Byzantine monasteries. He died in the year 532 and his feast day is on 5 December, the day of his death.

== Relics ==
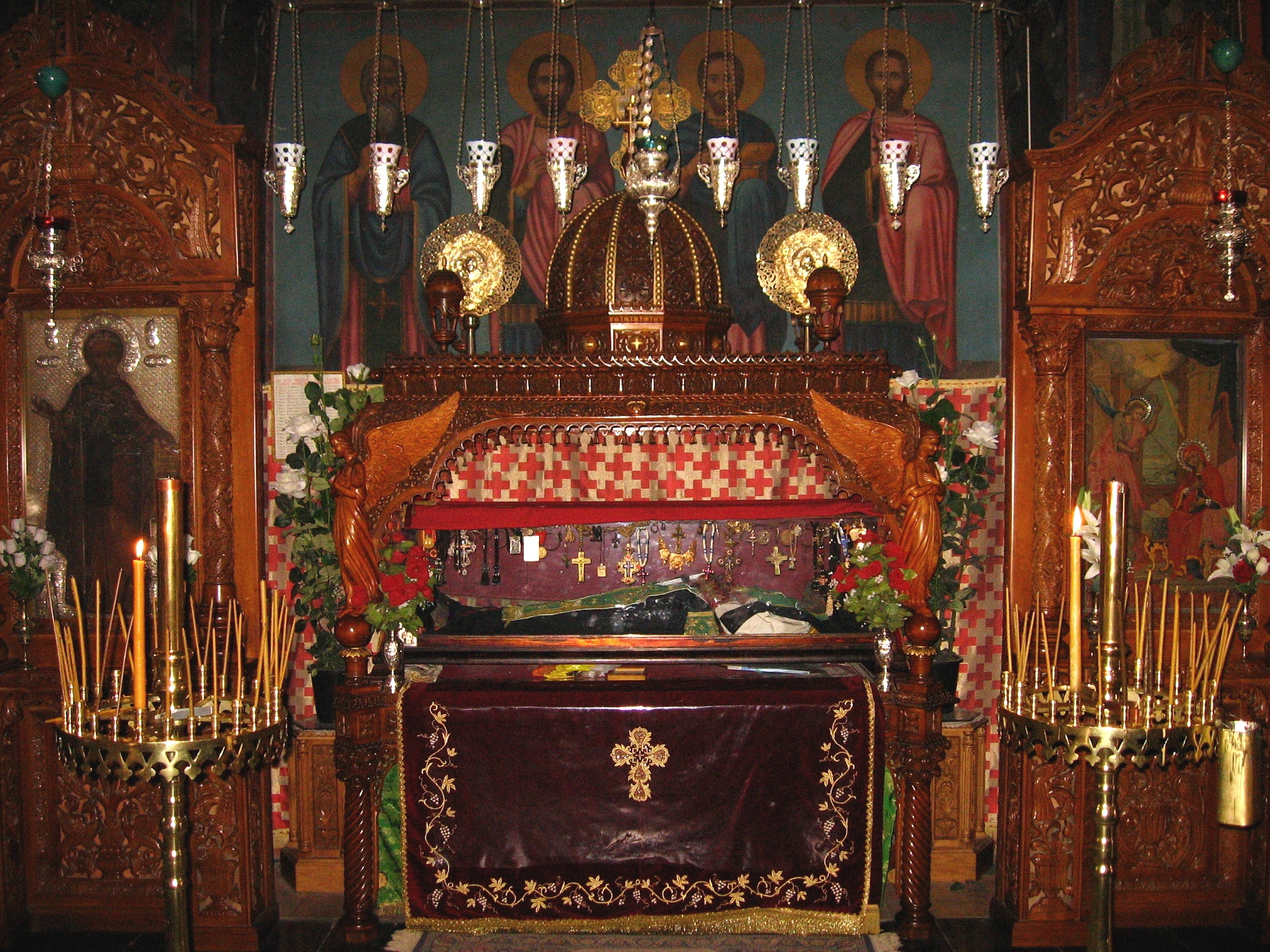
The relics of St. Sabbas in the Catholicon (main church) of Mar Saba monastery, in Palestine.

Sabbas's relics were taken by Crusaders in the 12th century as a result of the War of Saint Sabas and remained in Italy in the Church of Saint Anthony in Venice, until Pope Paul VI returned them to the monastery in 1965 as a gesture of good will towards the Orthodox.

== Vita and scholarship ==
Sabbas's Life was written by his disciple Cyril of Scythopolis. The chief modern authority is A. Ehrhard in Wetzer and Welte's Kirchenlexikon (ed. 2) and Römische Quartalschaft, vii; see also Pierre Helyot, Histoire des ordres religieux (1714), i.C.16, and Max Heimbucher, Orden u. Kongregationen (1907), i, §10.

== Legacy ==
His Great Lavra long continued to be the most influential monastery in those parts, and produced several distinguished monks, among them St John of Damascus. It is now known as the monastery of Mar Saba. The church of San Saba in Rome is dedicated to him.

The San Saba River in Texas, and other features in the area, are named after Sabbas; it was so called because Juan Antonio Bustillo y Ceballos discovered the river on St. Sabbas's day, 5 December 1732, and named it Río de San Sabá de las Nueces ("River of Saint Sabbas of the Walnuts").

== See also ==
- Anthony the Great (c. 251 – 356), monk who established Christian monasticism in the Egyptian desert
- Chariton the Confessor (end of 3rd century - ca. 350), founder of lavra-type monasticism in the Judaean desert
- Euthymius the Great (377–473), founder of monasteries in Palestine and saint
- Saint Sabbas the Sanctified, patron saint archive
- Sabbas (disambiguation) including Saint Sabbas, Saint Sabas, Saint Sava
- Saint Sava (1169/74–1236), Serbian prince and Orthodox monk who visited Mar Saba

== Bibliography ==
- This article incorporates text from a publication now in the public domain: Chisholm, Hugh, ed. (1911). "Sabas, St". Encyclopædia Britannica. Vol. 23 (11th ed.). Cambridge University Press.
- Patrich, Joseph (1995). Sabas, Leader of Palestinian Monasticism: A Comparative Study in Eastern Monasticism, Fourth to Seventh Centuries. Dumbarton Oaks studies. Vol. 32. Dumbarton Oaks. ISBN 0884022218. ISSN 0070-7554.
- Speake, Graham (2021). Encyclopedia of Greece and the Hellenic Tradition. Routledge. p. 1697. ISBN 978-1-135-94206-9.
