= January 12 (Eastern Orthodox liturgics) =

Day in the Eastern Orthodox liturgical calendar

Eastern Orthodox liturgical calendar
January 11	January 12	January 13
January 12 O.S. ≍ January 25 N.S. January 12 N.S ≍ December 30 O.S.

An Eastern Orthodox cross

January 12 in Eastern Orthodox liturgical calendars is a feast day and a day of commemoration of saints and martyrs. Although some Orthodox churches use the Revised Julian Calendar and others use the traditional Julian calendar, the fixed commemorations for their respective January 12 are broadly the same, no matter which calendar is used. (Note: Despite the dates being the same, the days to which they refer typically differ by 13 days. The notation Old Style or O.S. is sometimes used to indicate a date in the traditional Julian Calendar (the "Old Calendar"). The notation New Style or N.S, indicates a date in the Revised Julian calendar (the "New Calendar").)

== Feasts ==
- Afterfeast of the Theophany of Our Lord and Savior Jesus Christ

== Saints ==
- Virgin Martyr Tatiana of Rome, and those who suffered with her (226-235) (Note: "AT Rome, in the time of the emperor Alexander, St. Tatiana, martyr, who was torn with iron hooks and combs, thrown to the beasts and cast into the fire, but, having received no injury, was beheaded, and thus went to heaven.")
- Martyr Mertius of Mauretania (284–305)
- Martyr Philotheus of Antioch (c. 305)
- Martyr Peter Apselamus of Eleutheropolis, Palestine (309-310) (see also January 13, and October 14)
- Venerable Eupraxia of Tabenna, Egypt (393)
- Saints Tygrius the Presbyter, and Eutropius the Lector, at Constantinople (c. 395 - 408) (see also: June 16)
- Holy Eight Martyrs of Nicaea, by the sword.
- Virgin Martyr Euthasia, by the sword.
- Venerable Elias the Hermit, Wonderworker of Egypt, Desert Father, of The Paradise (4th century) (see also January 8)
- Saint Eulogia, mother of Saint Theodosius the Cenobiarch (4th century)
- Venerable Theodora of Alexandria, instructress of nuns (5th century) (Note: "Theodora was a glorious nun and teacher of the nuns from Alexandria. 'Just as trees require winter and snow in order to bear fruit, so trials and temptations are needed for our life,' spoke this holy woman. She died peacefully at the beginning of the fifth century.")

== Pre-Schism Western saints ==
- Saint Arcadius of Mauretania, a prominent citizen of Caesarea in Mauretania Caesariensis, barbarously martyred under Maximianus Herculeus (c. 302)
- Martyrs Zoticus, Rogatus, Modestus, Casutlus, between forty and fifty soldiers, in Africa.
- Saint John of Ravenna (Giovanni I Angelopte), Bishop of Ravenna and Confessor (494) (Note: "Bishop of Ravenna in Italy from 452 to 494. He saved his flock from the fury of Attila the Hun and mitigated its lot when the city was taken by Theodoric, King of the Ostrogoths." Andreas Agnellus lists only one bishop of Ravenna with this name in the 5th century. Although Agnellus mistakenly assigns events dated to the earlier part of the century to John's office, John's surviving epitaph (CIL 11, 304) states he was bishop 16 Years, ten months and 18 days, and was buried 5 June 494.)
- Saint Caesaria, the gifted sister of Saint Caesarius of Arles and Abbess of the convent founded there by her brother (c. 530)
- Saint Victorian of Asan, founder and abbot of the monastery of Asan (now called San Vitorián) (c. 560)
- Saint Probus, Bishop of Verona, Italy (c. 591)
- Saint Eilian of Rome (Eilian of Anglesey), (6th century) (Note: Saint Eilian (Eilianus) came from Rome and lived around the 6th century AD. He came to Britain, where he lived as a hermit in the area north of Anglesey, and venerably reposed in peace.) (see also January 13)
- Saint Salvius (Sauve), Bishop of Amiens, his relics were enshrined in Montreuil in Picardy (c. 625)
- Saint Benedict Biscop, Abbot of Wearmouth and Confessor (690)

== Post-Schism Orthodox saints ==
- Saint Sava I, Enlightener and first Archbishop of Serbia (1235 or 1237) (see also: January 14 - Greek)
- Venerable Martinian, Abbot of White Lake Monastery (1483) (Note: See: (in Russian) Мартиниан Белозерский. Википедии. (Russian Wikipedia).)
- Venerable Galacteon, disciple of Saint Martinian of White Lake, Fool for Christ (1506)
- Venerable Archimandrite Theodosius (Maslov) of Tisman and Sophroniev Monasteries, fellow-struggler of St. Paisius Velichkovsky (1802) (see also: May 12 - Synaxis of the Elders of Sofronievo-Molchensk)
- Saint John of Tula, Fool-for-Christ (1850) (Note: See: (in Russian) Иоанн Тульский. Википедии. (Russian Wikipedia).)

=== New martyrs and confessors ===
- Venerable Hieromartyr Joasaph Borovsky, Archimandrite, of the St. Paphnutius Monastery at Borovsk (1610) (Note: See: (in Russian) Иоасаф Боровский. Википедии. (Russian Wikipedia).) (see also: July 6 - Synaxis of the Saints of Radonezh)
- New Virgin Martyrs Neollina, Domnina, and Parthena of Edessa, Macedonia (14th century) (On the first Sunday after Theophany (January 7-13).)

== Other commemorations ==
- Synaxis of the Icon of the Most Holy Theotokos "The Milk-giver" (Panagia Galaktotrofoussa; Mlekopitatelnica).
- Synaxis of the Icon of the Most Holy Theotokos "Akathist" at Hilandar. (Note: See: (in Russian) Акафистная Хиландарская икона Божией Матери. Википедии. (Russian Wikipedia).)
- Synaxis of the Icon of the Most Holy Theotokos "Mesopantitissis" in Crete (Theotokos of Mesopantitissis). (Note: The holy icon of "Panagia Mesopantitissis" was brought to Crete from Constantinople during the Iconoclastic period, in order to save it from the impious fury of the iconoclasts. According to Holy Tradition it was painted by St. Luke the Apostle. During the period of Venetian rule in Crete, it was kept in the Temple of the Holy Apostle Titus in Heraklion. Every Tuesday pious Christians prayed a litany before the holy icon. When Heraklion was captured by the Hagarenes, the Venetians took the venerable icon of the Virgin Mary and transferred it to Venice, where they placed it in the Church of the Most Holy Theotokos of the Salutations, where it has been kept there until today. A copy of the Holy Icon can be found in the Church of the Holy Apostle Titus in Heraklion, where the feast of the Synaxis of this icons is celebrated.)
- Icon of the Mother of God "Priestly" (Popskaya).
- Founder's Icon of the Mother of God at Vatopedi Monastery.
- Commemoration of the Church of St. Alexander, near the Church of the Holy Apostles, in Constantinople.

== Icon gallery ==
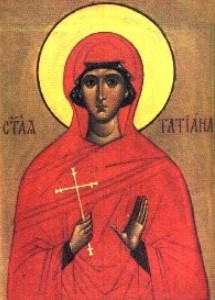
St. Tatiana of Rome.

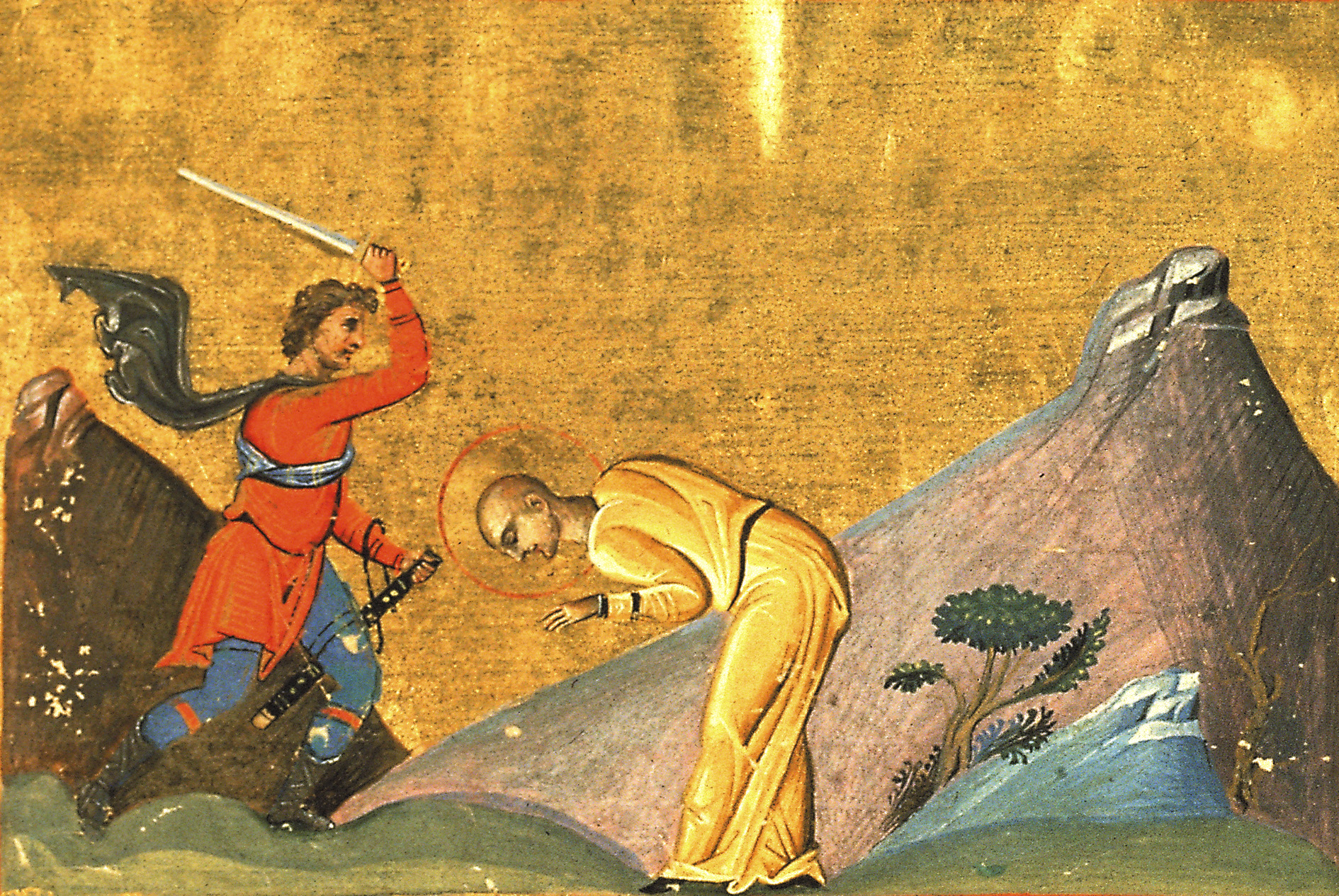
Martyrdom of St. Tatiana of Rome.
(Menologion of Basil II, 10th century).

Martyr Mertius of Mauretania.
(Menologion of Basil II, 10th century).

Martyr Peter Apselamus of Eleutheropolis in Palestine.
(Menologion of Basil II, 10th century).

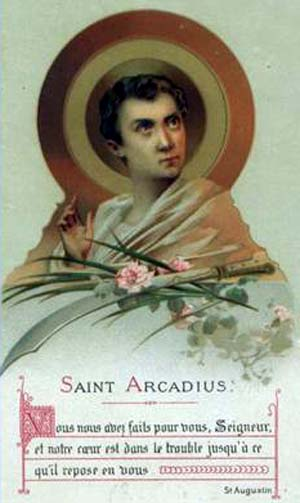
Saint Arcadius of Mauretania, martyr.

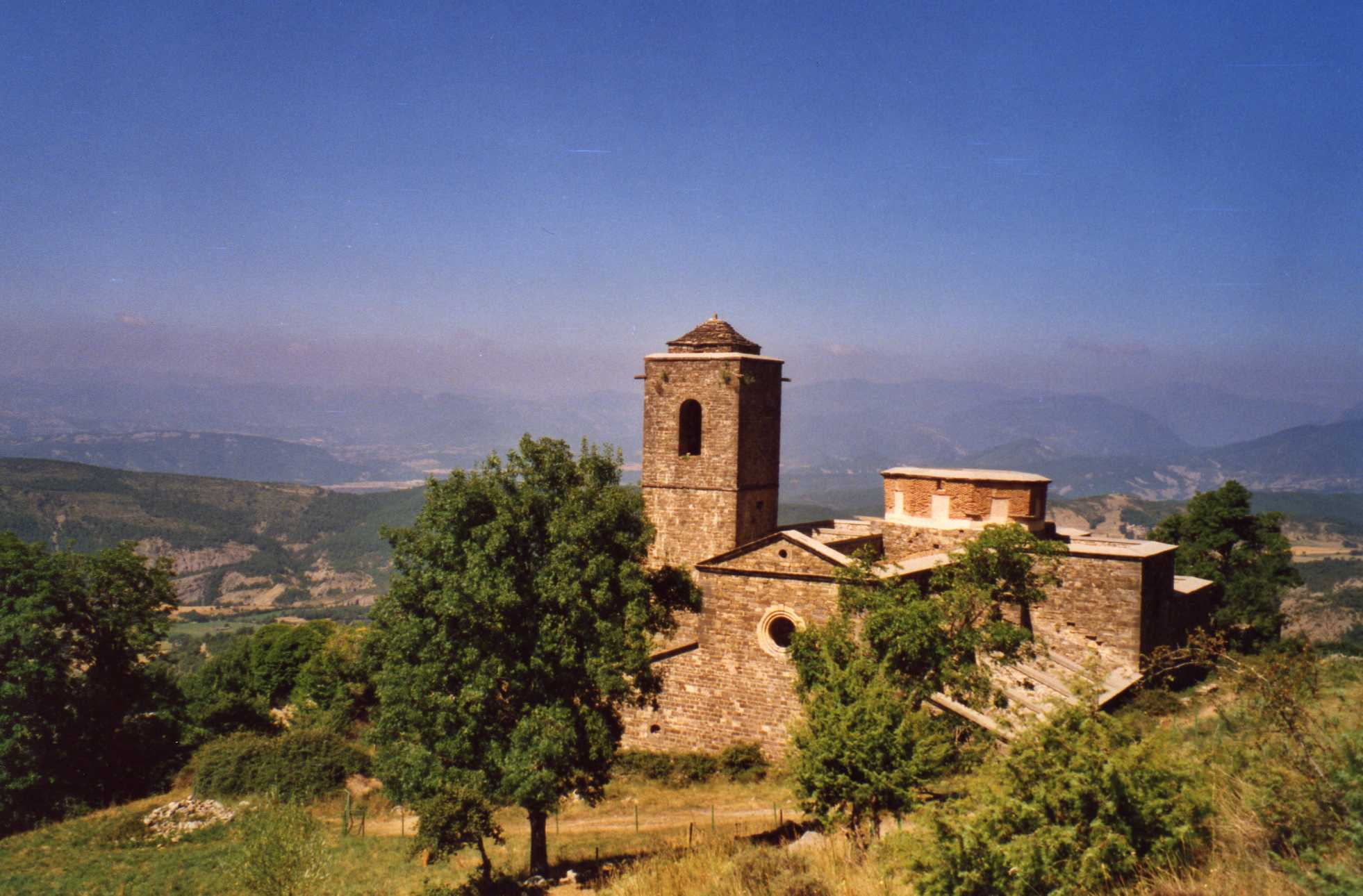
Monastery of Saint Victorian of Asan.

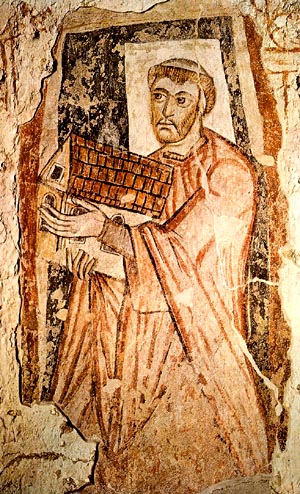
St. Benet (Benedict Biscop), carrying St. Peter's Basilica to Britain.

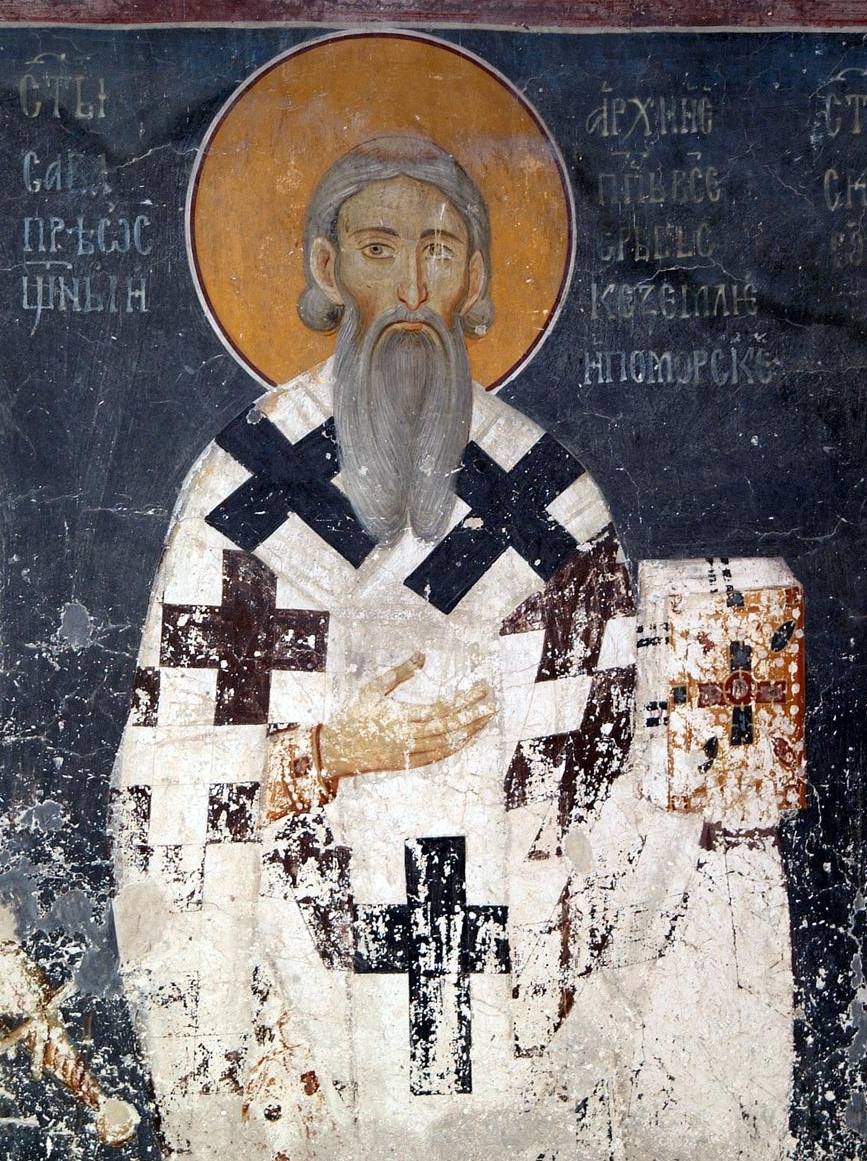
Fresco of Saint Sava, King's Church in Studenica, Serbia.

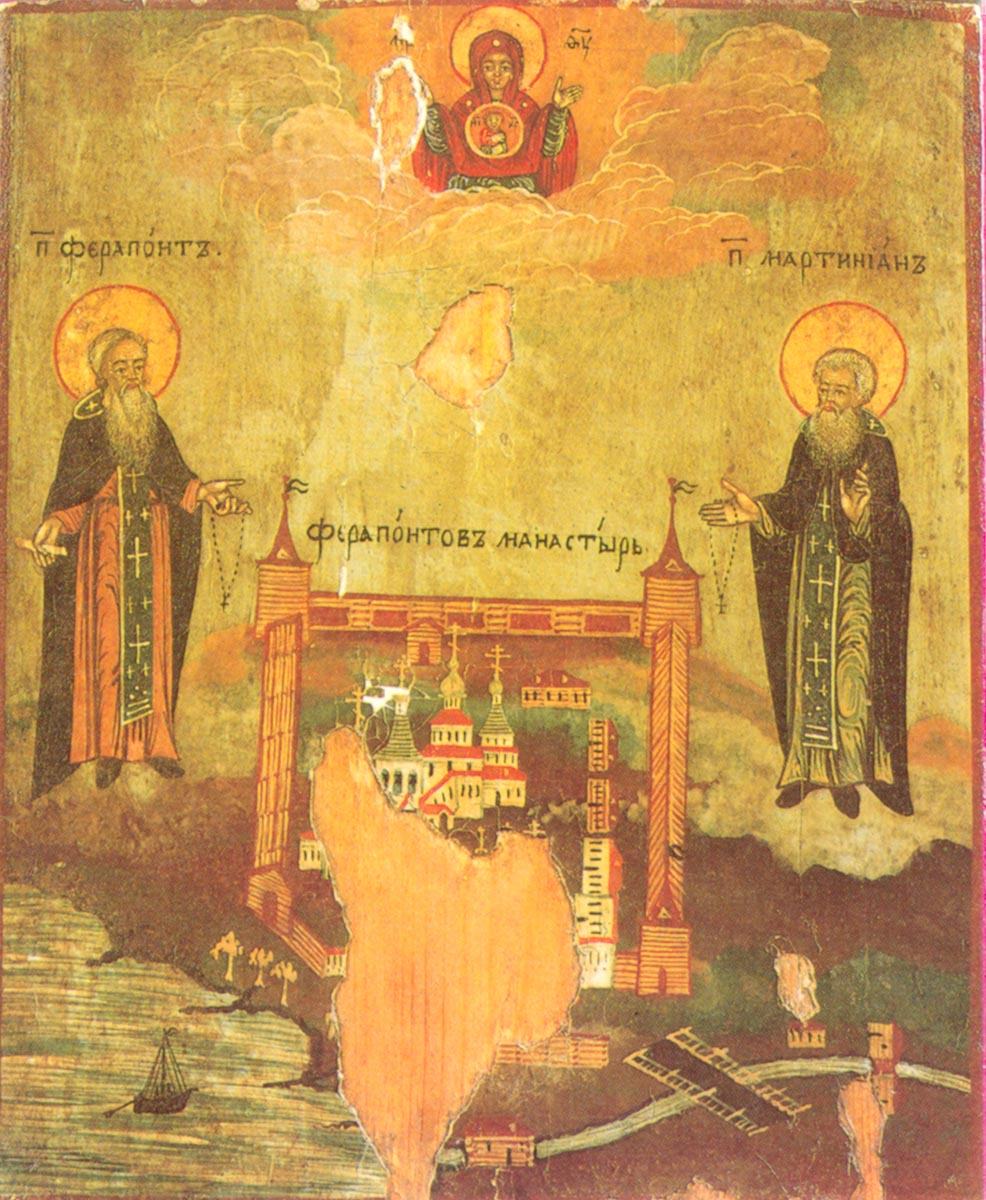
Venerable Ferapont (left) and Martinian (right), Abbot of White Lake Monastery.

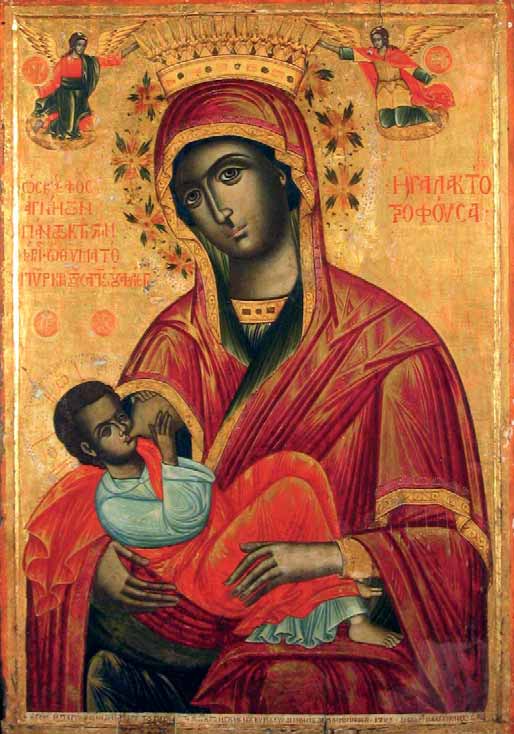
Icon of the Most Holy Theotokos "The Milk-giver".
(By Makarios, 1784).

Icon of the Most Holy Theotokos "Akathist" at Hilandar.

== Sources ==
- January 12/January 25. Orthodox Calendar (PRAVOSLAVIE.RU).
- January 25 / January 12. HOLY TRINITY RUSSIAN ORTHODOX CHURCH (A parish of the Patriarchate of Moscow).
- January 12. OCA - The Lives of the Saints.
- The Autonomous Orthodox Metropolia of Western Europe and the Americas (ROCOR). St. Hilarion Calendar of Saints for the year of our Lord 2004. St. Hilarion Press (Austin, TX). p. 7.
- January 12. Latin Saints of the Orthodox Patriarchate of Rome.
- The Roman Martyrology. Transl. by the Archbishop of Baltimore. Last Edition, According to the Copy Printed at Rome in 1914. Revised Edition, with the Imprimatur of His Eminence Cardinal Gibbons. Baltimore: John Murphy Company, 1916. pp. 12–13.

Greek Sources

- Great Synaxaristes: (in Greek) 12 ΙΑΝΟΥΑΡΙΟΥ. ΜΕΓΑΣ ΣΥΝΑΞΑΡΙΣΤΗΣ.
- (in Greek) Συναξαριστής. 12 Ιανουαρίου. ECCLESIA.GR. (H ΕΚΚΛΗΣΙΑ ΤΗΣ ΕΛΛΑΔΟΣ).

Russian Sources

- (in Russian) 25 января (12 января). Православная Энциклопедия под редакцией Патриарха Московского и всея Руси Кирилла (электронная версия). (Orthodox Encyclopedia - Pravenc.ru).
- (in Russian) 12 января (ст.ст.) 25 января 2014 (нов. ст.). Русская Православная Церковь Отдел внешних церковных связей. (DECR).
