= January 13 (Eastern Orthodox liturgics) =

Day in the Eastern Orthodox liturgical calendar

Eastern Orthodox liturgical calendar
January 12	January 13	January 14
January 13 O.S. ≍ January 26 N.S. January 13 N.S ≍ December 31 O.S.

An Eastern Orthodox cross

January 13 in Eastern Orthodox liturgical calendars is a feast day and a day of commemoration of saints and martyrs. Although some Orthodox churches use the Revised Julian Calendar and others use the traditional Julian calendar, the fixed commemorations for their respective January 13 are broadly the same, no matter which calendar is used. (Note: Despite the dates being the same, the days to which they refer typically differ by 13 days. The notation Old Style or O.S. is sometimes used to indicate a date in the traditional Julian Calendar (the "Old Calendar"). The notation New Style or N.S, indicates a date in the Revised Julian calendar (the "New Calendar").)

== Feasts ==
- Afterfeast of the Theophany of Our Lord and Savior Jesus Christ

== Saints ==
- Martyr Peter of Anium, at Eleutheropolis (Peter Apselamus) (309-310) (see also January 12, and October 14)
- Martyrs Hermylus (Hermilos) the Deacon and Stratonicus (Stratonikos), at Belgrade (315)
- Martyr Athanasius, beaten to death with rods.
- Martyrs Pachomius and Papyrinus in Greece, who were drowned in a river.
- Saint Jacob, Bishop of Nisibis, the "Moses of Mesopotamia" (c. 350) (Note: Jacob of Nisibis was called the "Moses of Mesopotamia" for his wisdom and wonderworking abilities. He was the second Bishop of Nisibis, spiritual father of the renowned Syriac writer and theologian Ephrem the Syrian, celebrated ascetic and one of the 318 fathers of the First Ecumenical Council at Nicaea.)

== Pre-Schism Western saints ==
- Saint Potitus, a boy venerated as a martyr near Naples, Italy (c. 138 - 161) (Note: "In Sardinia, St. Potitus, martyr, who, having suffered much under the emperor Antoninus and the governor Gelasius, was at last put to death by the sword.") (see also: July 1)
- Saint Andrew, twelfth Bishop of Trier, Germany, sometimes listed as a martyr (235)
- Forty soldier-martyrs of Rome, who suffered on the Via Lavicana, under Gallienus (262) (Note: "At Rome, on the Lavican road, the crowning of forty holy soldiers, a reward they merited by confessing the true faith, under the emperor Gallienus.")
- Saint Agricius (Agrecius, Agritius), Bishop of Trier, Germany, took part in the Council of Arles in 314 (c. 333)
- Saint Hilary, Bishop of Poitiers (Pictavium) (368) (Note: Born in Poitiers in France of pagan patrician parents, he married early in life. Shortly after he became Orthodox and in 353 he became Bishop of Poitiers. At once he began a campaign against Arianism and for this reason was exiled to Phrygia by the Arian Emperor Constantius. But in Phrygia he was even more objectionable to the Arians, who clamoured for his recall. He returned to Poiters in 360.)
- Saint Viventius, an eastern priest who travelled to the West and attached himself to Saint Hilary of Poitiers, ended his life as a hermit (c. 400)
- Saint Erbin (Ervan, Erbyn, Erme), King of Dumnonia (now Cornwall and Devon) and saint of Wales (c. 480)
- Saint Remigius, Apostle to the Franks (437–533), and Bishop of Rheims from 459 (533) (Note: "AT Rheims, in France, St. Remigius, bishop confessor, who converted the Franks to Christ, regenerated Clovis, their king, in the sacred font of baptism and instructed him in the mysteries of faith. After he had been many years bishop, and had distinguished himself by his sanctity and the power of working miracles, he departed this life on the 13th of January. His festival, however, is kept on this day (October 1), when his sacred body was translated.")
- Saint Elian (Eilan, Allan), Missionary to Cornwall, England (6th century) (Note: Probably born in Cornwall, he belonged to the family of St. Ismael. Llanelian in Anglesey and Llanelian in Clwyd are named after him and St. Allen's church in Cornwall is dedicated to him.) (see also: January 12 - Greek)
- Saint Kentigern (Kentigern Mungo, Kentigern of Glasgow), Apostle of the Brythonic Kingdom of Strathclyde and patron saint and founder of the city of Glasgow (614) (Note: The name Mungo means 'darling'. He began preaching in Cathures on the Clyde on the site of the city of Glasgow and was consecrated first Bishop of the Strathclyde Britons. Driven into exile, he preached around Carlisle and then went to Wales, where he stayed with St. David at Menevia. Returning to Scotland, he continued his labours, making Glasgow his centre. He is venerated as the Apostle of north-west England and south-west Scotland.) (see also January 14 - Russian)
- Saint Enogatus, fifth successor of Saint Malo as Bishop of Aleth in Brittany (631)
- Saints Gumesindus and Servusdei, two martyrs, one a parish-priest, the other a monk, in Cordoba in Spain under Abderrahman II (852)
- Saint Berno, first Abbot of Cluny and initiator of the Cluniac reforms which spread across Europe (927) (Note: Born in Burgundy in France, he became a monk at St. Martin's Abbey in Autun. He restored Baume-les-Messieurs and founded monasteries at Gigny, Bourg-Dieu, Massay and Cluny (910), where he was abbot until 926.)

== Post-Schism Orthodox saints ==
- Venerable Maximos Kavsokalyvites of Kavsokalyvia (Kafsokalyvia), Mount Athos (1354)
- Saint Jeremias I (Jeremiah I), Patriarch of Constantinople (1546) (Note: St. Jeremias I was formally numbered among the Saints by the Holy and Sacred Synod of the Ecumenical Patriarchate of Constantinople on January 10, 2023 (N.S.).)
- Saint Irenarchus (Irenarch) the Recluse of Rostov (1616)
- Venerable Eleazar of Anzersk Island at Solovki (1656) (Note: See: (in Russian) Елеазар Анзерский. Википедии. (Russian Wikipedia).)
- Saint Joseph (Naniescu) the Merciful, Metropolitan of Moldova (1902) (Note: See: (in Romanian) Iosif Naniescu. Wikipedia. (Romanian Wikipedia).)

== Other commemorations ==
- Panagia Mesopanditissa (Mediator of All) Icon of the Mother of God, of Crete.
- Consecration of the monastery of the Prophet Elias - the so-called "Monastery of the Deep Stream" - in Triglia, Bithynia (10th century) (Note: (in Greek): "Τα εγκαίνια της Μονής του Προφήτου Ηλιού της καλουμένης του Βαθέος Pύακος.")

== Icon gallery ==
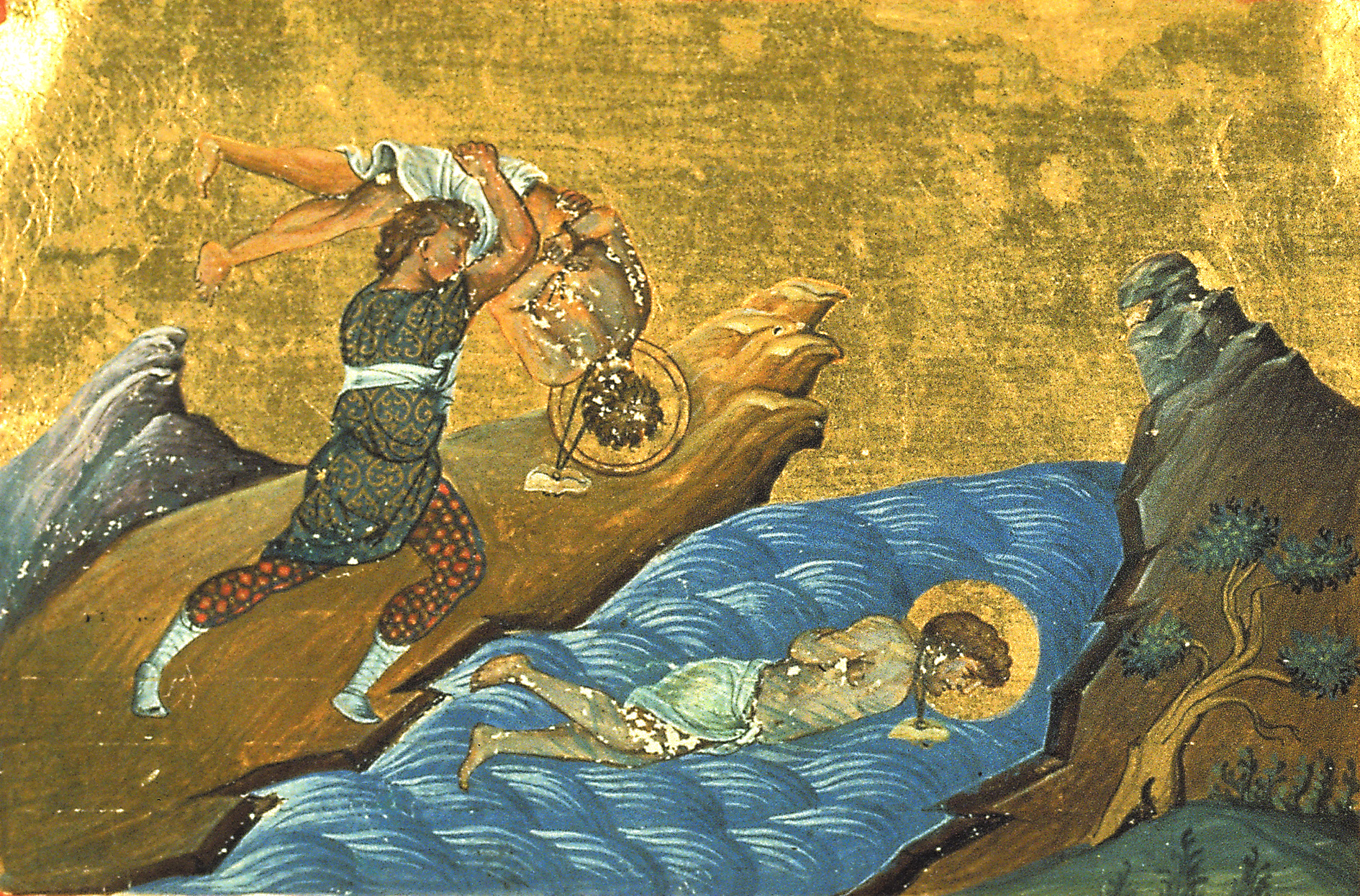
Martyrs Hermylus and Stratonicus at Belgrade.
(Menologion of Basil II, 10th century).

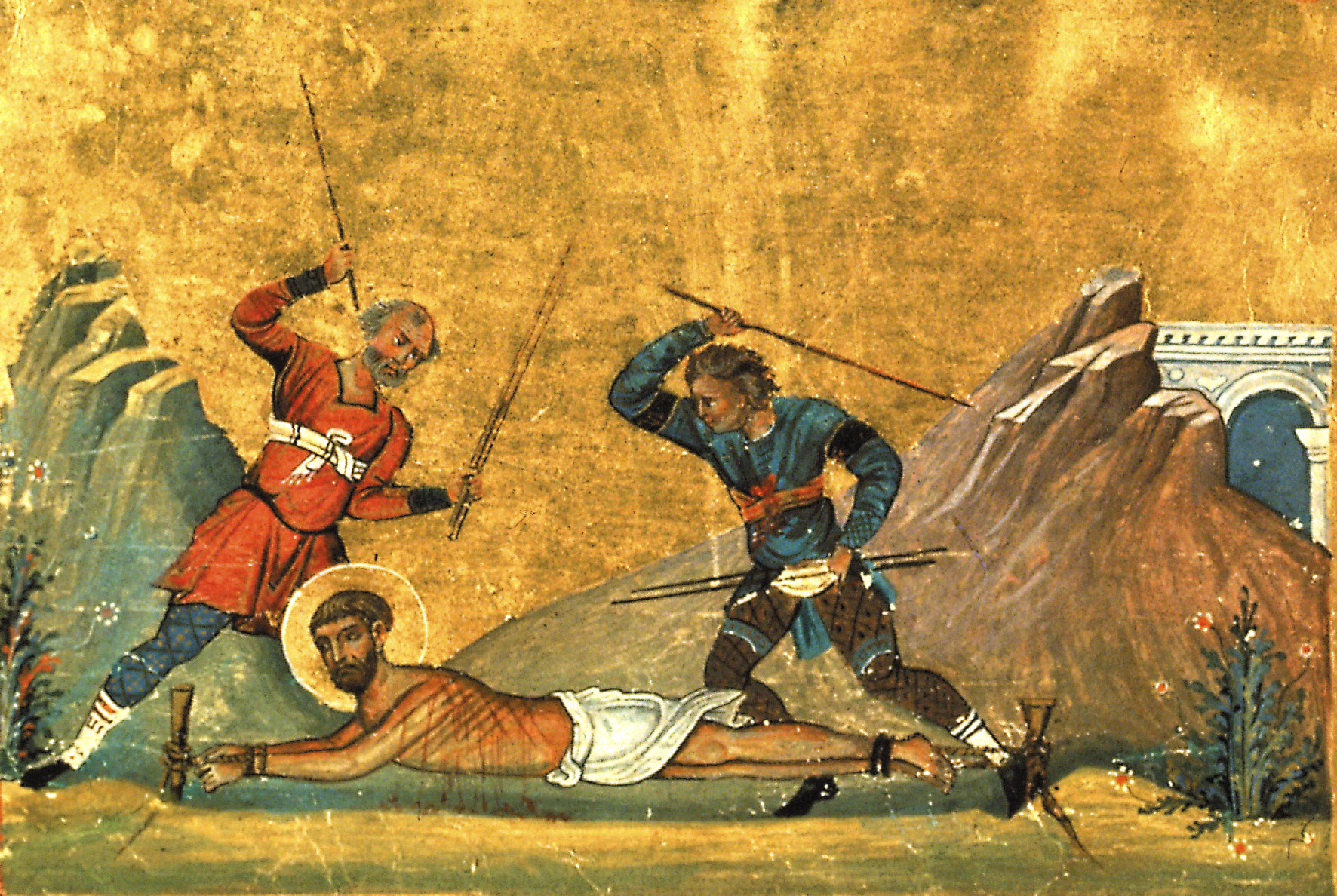
Martyr Athanasius.
(Menologion of Basil II, 10th century).

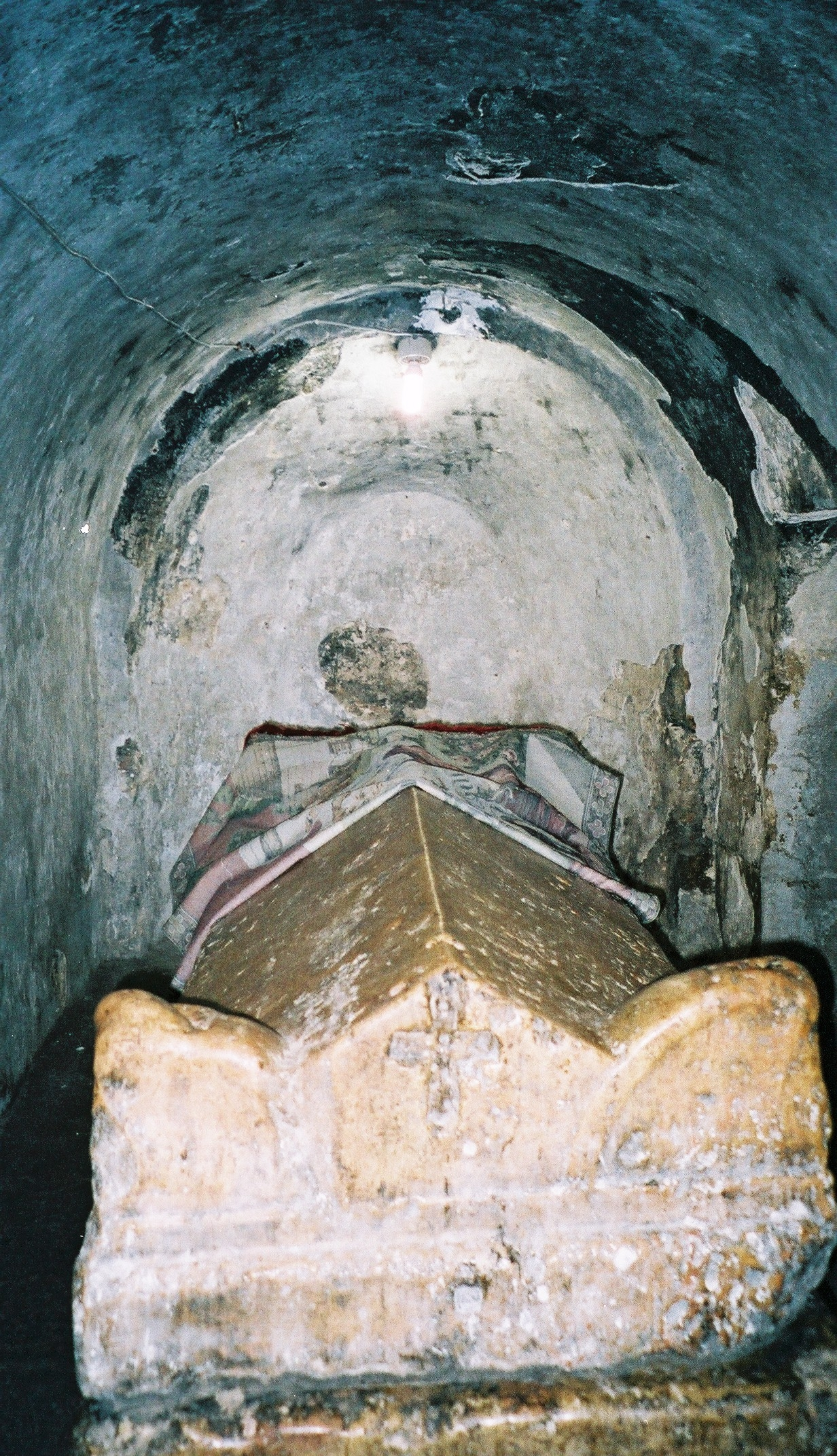
Tomb of St. Jacob of Nisibis, at the Church of Saint Jacob of Nisibis, in Nisibis.

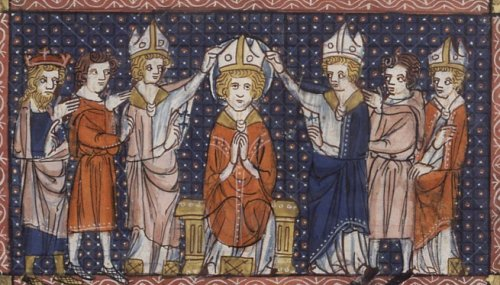
The ordination of St. Hilary of Poitiers
(14th century; Vie de saintes)

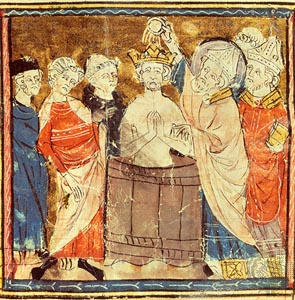
St. Remigius baptizes Clovis I.
(14th century).

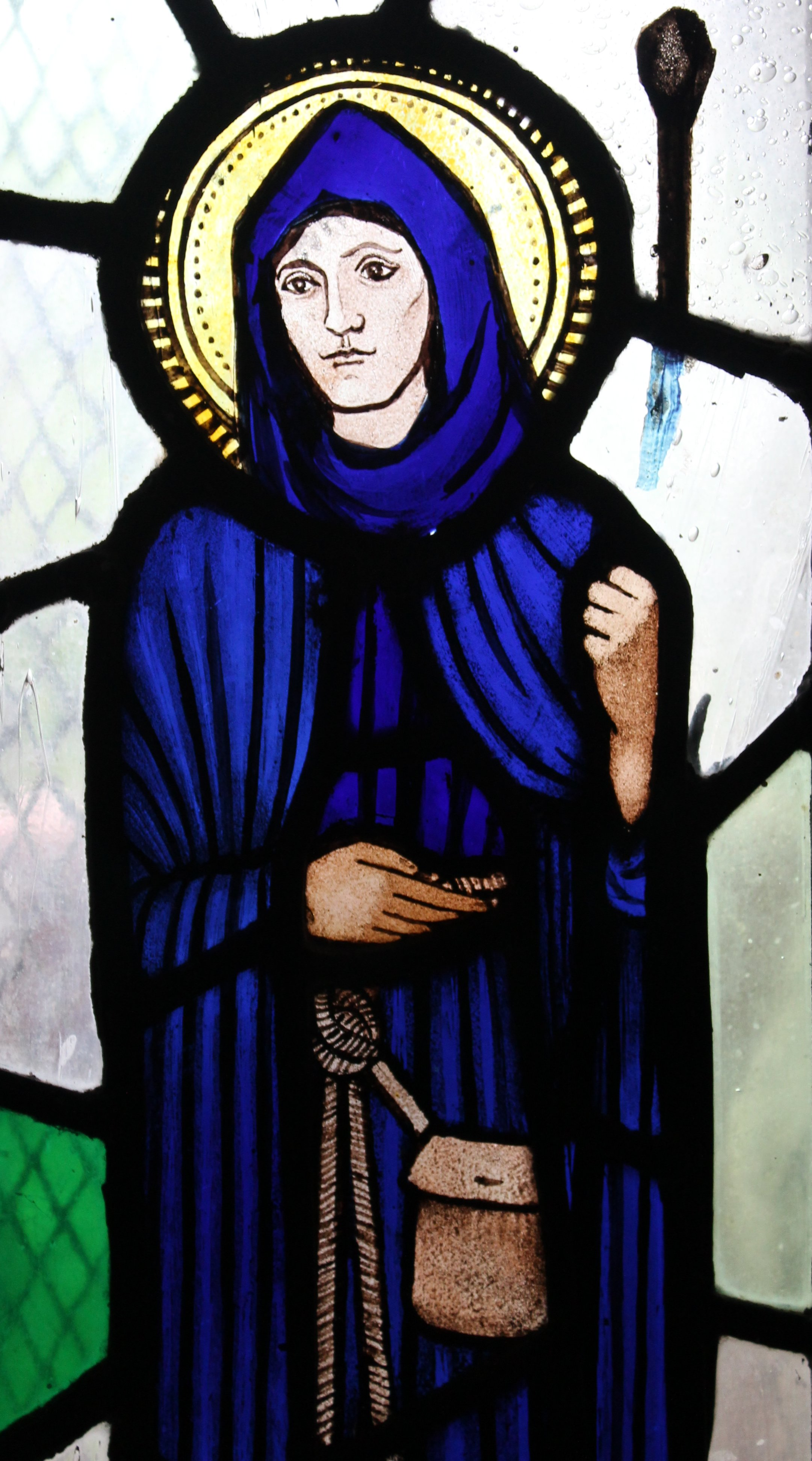
St. Elian, Missionary to Cornwall, England.
(St Trillo's Chapel, Rhos-on-Sea, 1934).

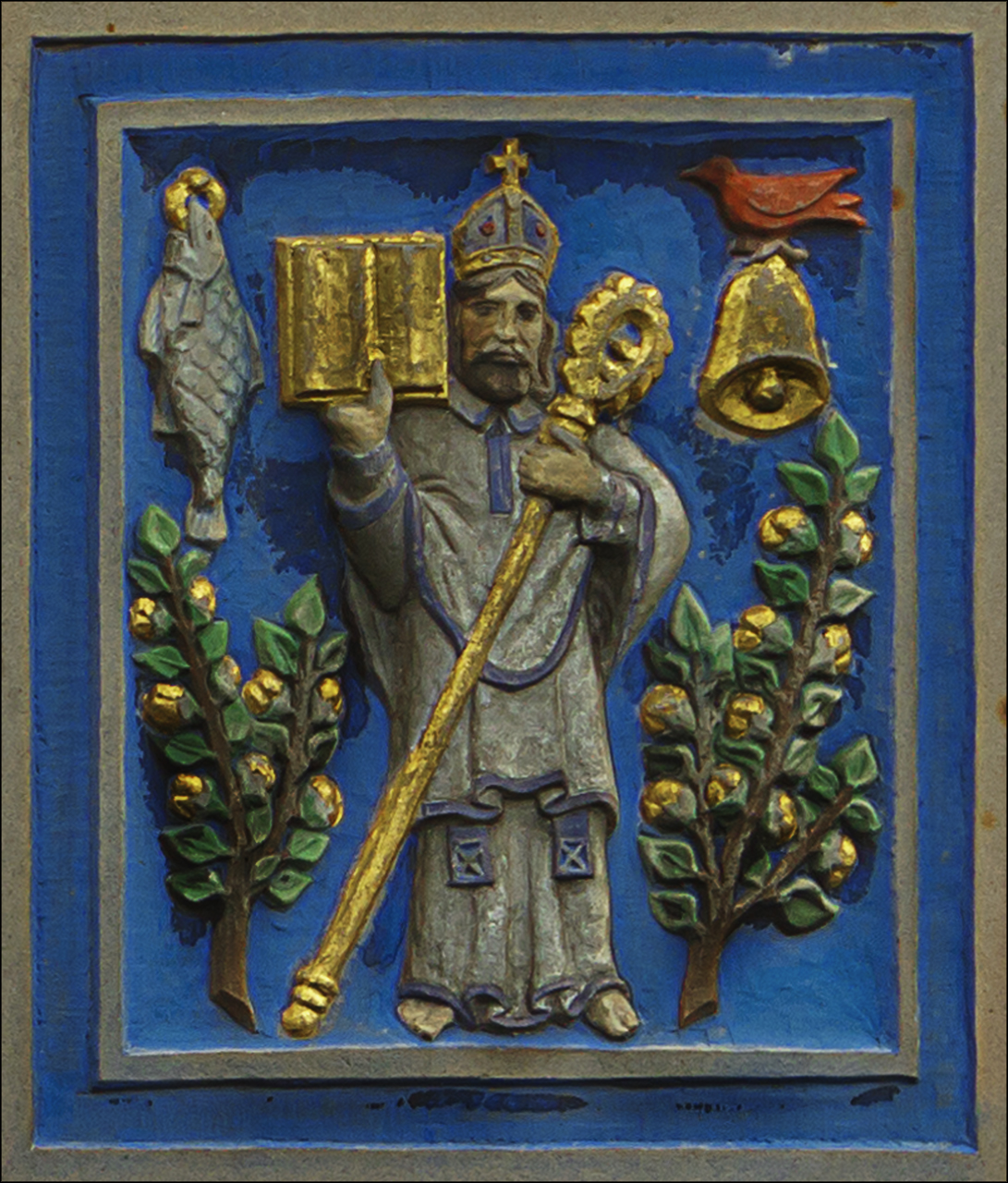
St. Kentigern, with a robin, a bell, and a fish with a ring in its mouth.

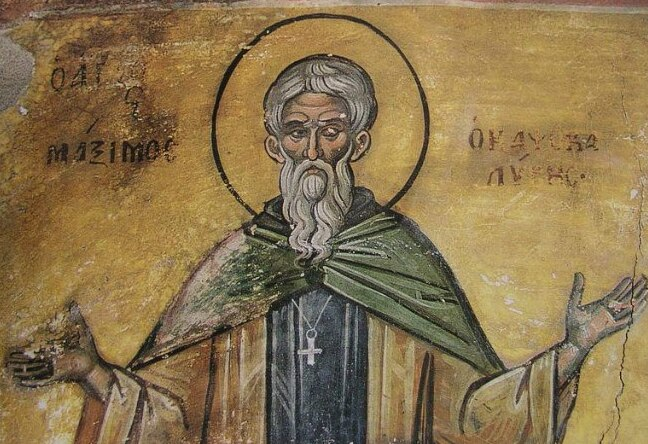
St. Maximos Kavsokalyvites.
(Dionysiou Monastery, 1547).

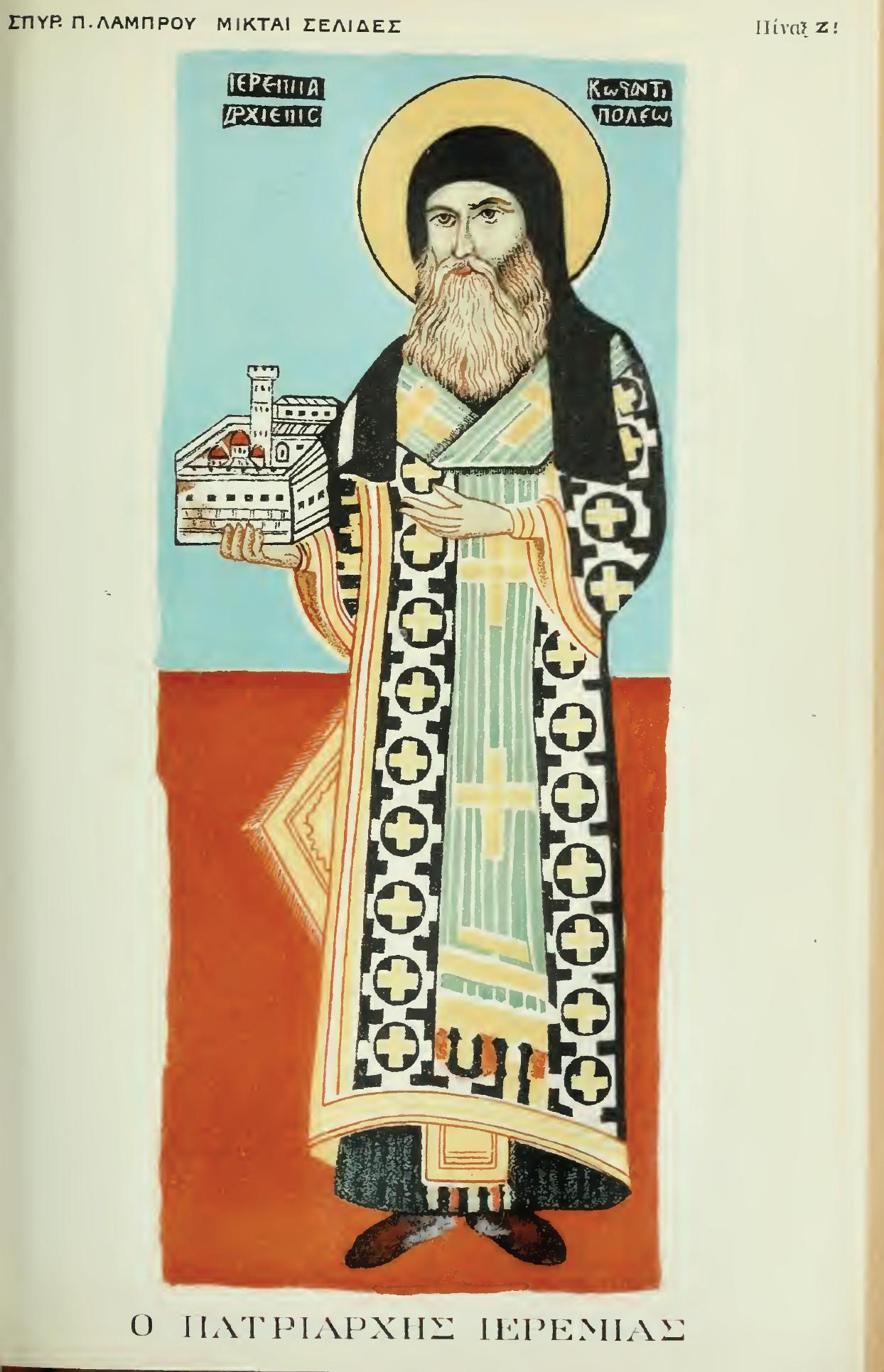
Saint Jeremias I, Patriarch of Constantinople.
(16th century).

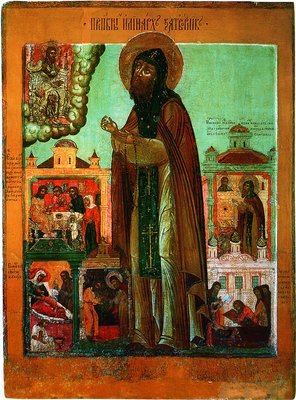
St. Irenarchus of Rostov.

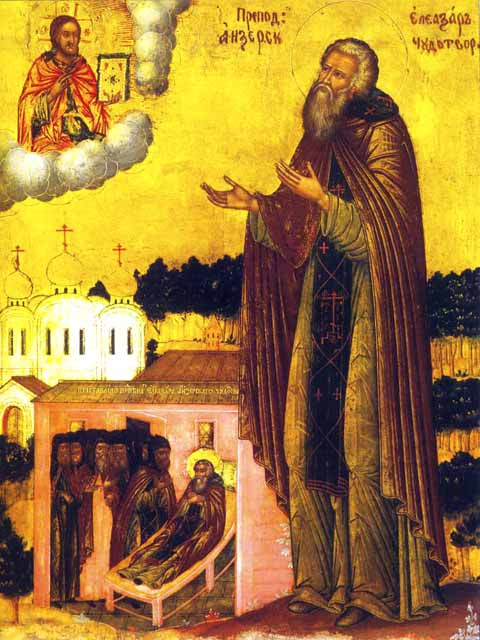
St. Eleazar of Anzersk Island at Solovki.

St. Joseph (Naniescu) the Merciful, Metropolitan of Moldova.

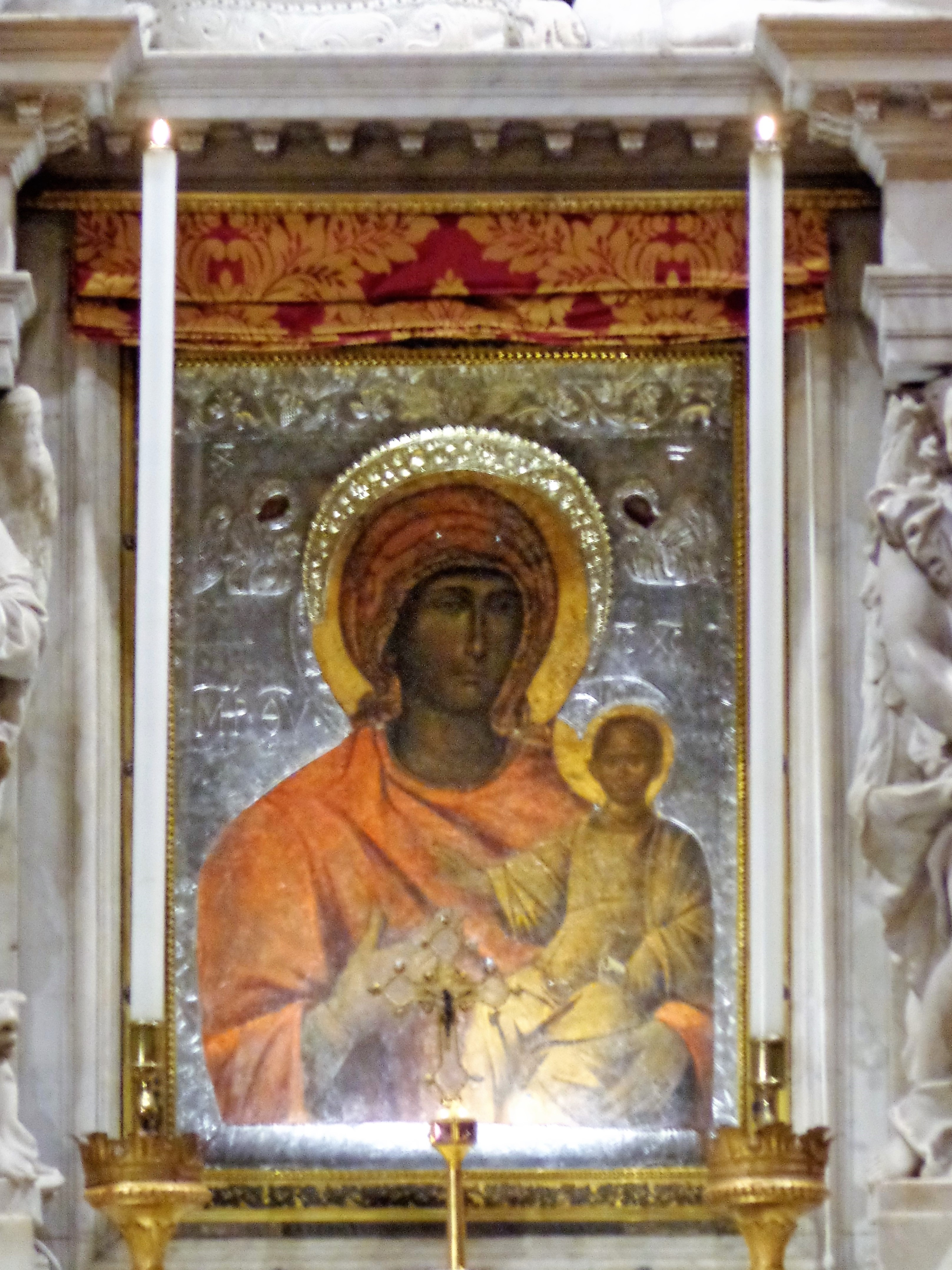
Icon of Panagia Mesopanditissa (Mediator of All).
(15th century).

== Sources ==
- January 13/January 26. Orthodox Calendar (PRAVOSLAVIE.RU).
- January 26 / January 13. HOLY TRINITY RUSSIAN ORTHODOX CHURCH (A parish of the Patriarchate of Moscow).
- January 13. OCA - The Lives of the Saints.
- The Autonomous Orthodox Metropolia of Western Europe and the Americas (ROCOR). St. Hilarion Calendar of Saints for the year of our Lord 2004. St. Hilarion Press (Austin, TX). p. 7.
- January 13. Latin Saints of the Orthodox Patriarchate of Rome.
- The Roman Martyrology. Transl. by the Archbishop of Baltimore. Last Edition, According to the Copy Printed at Rome in 1914. Revised Edition, with the Imprimatur of His Eminence Cardinal Gibbons. Baltimore: John Murphy Company, 1916. pp. 13–14.

Greek Sources

- Great Synaxaristes: (in Greek) 13 ΙΑΝΟΥΑΡΙΟΥ. ΜΕΓΑΣ ΣΥΝΑΞΑΡΙΣΤΗΣ.
- (in Greek) Συναξαριστής. 13 Ιανουαρίου. ECCLESIA.GR. (H ΕΚΚΛΗΣΙΑ ΤΗΣ ΕΛΛΑΔΟΣ).

Russian Sources

- (in Russian) 26 января (13 января). Православная Энциклопедия под редакцией Патриарха Московского и всея Руси Кирилла (электронная версия). (Orthodox Encyclopedia - Pravenc.ru).
- (in Russian) 13 января (ст.ст.) 26 января 2013 (нов. ст.). Русская Православная Церковь Отдел внешних церковных связей. (DECR).
