= June 16 (Eastern Orthodox liturgics) =

Day in the Eastern Orthodox liturgical calendar

Eastern Orthodox liturgical calendar
June 15	June 16	June 17
June 16 O.S. ≍ June 29 N.S. June 16 N.S ≍ June 3 O.S.

An Eastern Orthodox cross

June 16 in Eastern Orthodox liturgical calendars is a feast day and a day of commemoration of saints and martyrs. Although some Orthodox churches use the Revised Julian Calendar and others use the traditional Julian calendar, the fixed commemorations for their respective June 16 are broadly the same, no matter which calendar is used. (Note: Despite the dates being the same, the days to which they refer typically differ by 13 days. The notation Old Style or O.S. is sometimes used to indicate a date in the traditional Julian Calendar (the "Old Calendar"). The notation New Style or N.S. indicates a date in the Revised Julian calendar (the "New Calendar").)

== Saints ==
- Hieromartyr Mark, Bishop of Apollonias, nephew of the Apostle Barnabas (1st century)
- Martyr Elappas.
- Five Martyrs of Nicomedia, by the sword.
- Forty Martyrs of Rome, by fire.
- Hieromartyr Tigrius, Priest, and Martyr Eutropius, Reader, of Constantinople (404) (see also: January 12)
- Saint Mnemonios, Bishop of Amathus in Cyprus (4th century)
- Saint Tikhon of Amathus in Cyprus, Bishop and Wonderworker (425) (Note: "At Amathonte, in Cyprus, St. Tychon, a bishop in the time of Theodosius the Younger.")

== Pre-Schism Western saints ==
- Saints Ferreolus, Priest, and Ferrutio, Deacon, brothers from Asia Minor (c. 212) (Note: Ferreolus, a priest, and Ferrutio, a deacon, were brothers from Asia Minor. They were sent by St Irenaeus of Lyons to enlighten the area round Besançon in France, where they preached for thirty years and were finally martyred.) (Note: "AT Besancon, in France, the holy martyrs Ferreol, priest, and Ferrution, deacon, who were sent by the blessed bishop Irenseus to preach the word of God, and after being exposed to various torments under the judge Claudius, were put to the sword.")
- Saint Similien of Nantes (Sambin), third Bishop of Nantes in France, confessor; St Gregory of Tours testified to his holiness. (310)
- Saints Actinea and Graecina, both martyrs, the former was beheaded in Volterra in Italy under Diocletian (4th century)
- Saints Aureus of Mainz, Justina and Companions, during an invasion of the Huns (c. 436 or 451) (Note: During an invasion of the Huns, Aureus, Bishop of Mainz in Germany, was driven from his diocese and was followed by his sister, Justina, and others. After they returned, he and the others were martyred in church while celebrating the liturgy.) (Note: "At Mayence, the passion of the Saints Aurens, and Justina, his sister, and other martyrs, who, being at Mass in the church, were massacred by the Huns then devastating Germany." The relics have been translated to Heilgenstadt.)
- Saint Simplicius of Bourges, Bishop of Bourges in France, he defended the Church against the Arian Visigoths (477)
- Saint Cettin (Cethagh), a disciple of St Patrick of Ireland and consecrated bishop by him (5th century)
- Saint Berthaldus (Bertaud), a hermit in the Ardennes in France, who was ordained priest by St Remigius of Reims (c. 540)
- Saint Aurelianus of Arles, Bishop of Arles in France (c. 550) (Note: He became Bishop of Arles in France in 546. He founded two monastic houses, one for monks and one for nuns, and drew up for each a rule, based on that of St Caesarius.) (Note: "At Lyons, the demise of blessed Aurelian, bishop of Aries.")
- Venerable Colman McRoi, a deacon who was a disciple of St Columba, he founded a monastery at Reachrain, now Lambay Island, near Dublin in Ireland (6th century)
- Saint Curig, Bishop of Llanbadarn in Wales, where several churches are dedicated to him (6th century)
- Saints Felix and Maurus, father and son who lived as hermits at what is now called San Felice near Narni in central Italy (6th century) (Note: "S. Maurus was a priest of Caesarea in Palestine, who, feeling a great desire to visit Rome, left his wife Euphrosyne, at home, but took with him his infant son Felix, and the child's nurse. Having visited Rome, he settled down at a place now called San Felice, between Teramo and Narni, where S. Maurus built a habitation for himself, the child and the nurse. He is said by popular tradition to have killed a monstrous serpent that infested the neighbourhood with his stonemason's hammer, as he was building the house. S. Felix, his son, is believed also to have raised a dead person to life. The bodies of the. three repose at S. Felice.")
- Venerable Ismael (Isfael), a disciple of St Teilo in Wales, he was consecrated Bishop of Menevia by him (6th century) (Note: "This Saint is said to have been a disciple of St Theliau, and to have been consecrated Bishop by him. The name of ST. ISMAEL is found on this day in an ancient Calendar, and a parish still bears his designation.")

== Post-Schism Orthodox saints ==
- Venerable Sabbas of Moscow, Monk of Andronikov Monastery, Moscow (1378)
- Venerable Tikhon of Kaluga, or Medyn, founder of the St. Tikhon of Kaluga Monastery (1492)
- Saint Tikhon of Lukhov, Kostroma (1503) (Note: See: (in Russian) Тихон Луховской. Википедии. (Russian Wikipedia).)
- Martyr Kaikhosro of Georgia, monk, of Jerusalem, under Abbas I of Persia (1612)
- Saint Tikhon of Krestogorsk, founder of Krestogorsk Monastery, Vologda (17th century)
- Venerable Moses of Optina, founder and archimandrite of the Skete of St. John the Baptist (1862) (Note: See: (in Russian) Моисей Оптинский. Википедии. (Russian Wikipedia).)

=== New martyrs and confessors ===
- New Hieromartyr Hermogenes (Dolganyov), Bishop of Tobolsk, and those with him (1918):

- Priests Ephrem Dolganev, Michael Makarov and Peter Korelin.
- Martyr Constantine Miniatov. (Note: See: (in Russian) Минятов, Константин Александрович. Википедии. (Russian Wikipedia).)

== Other commemorations ==
- Uncovering of the relics (1200) of Venerable Theodore the Sykeote, Bishop of Anastasiopolis in Galatia (613)
- Repose of Elder Gerasimus of St. Tikhon of Kaluga Monastery (1898)
- Repose of Righteous Maria (1943), disciple of St. Paul of Taganrog.
- Translation of the relics (2002) of St. Theophan the Recluse, Bishop of Tambov (1894)

== Icon gallery ==
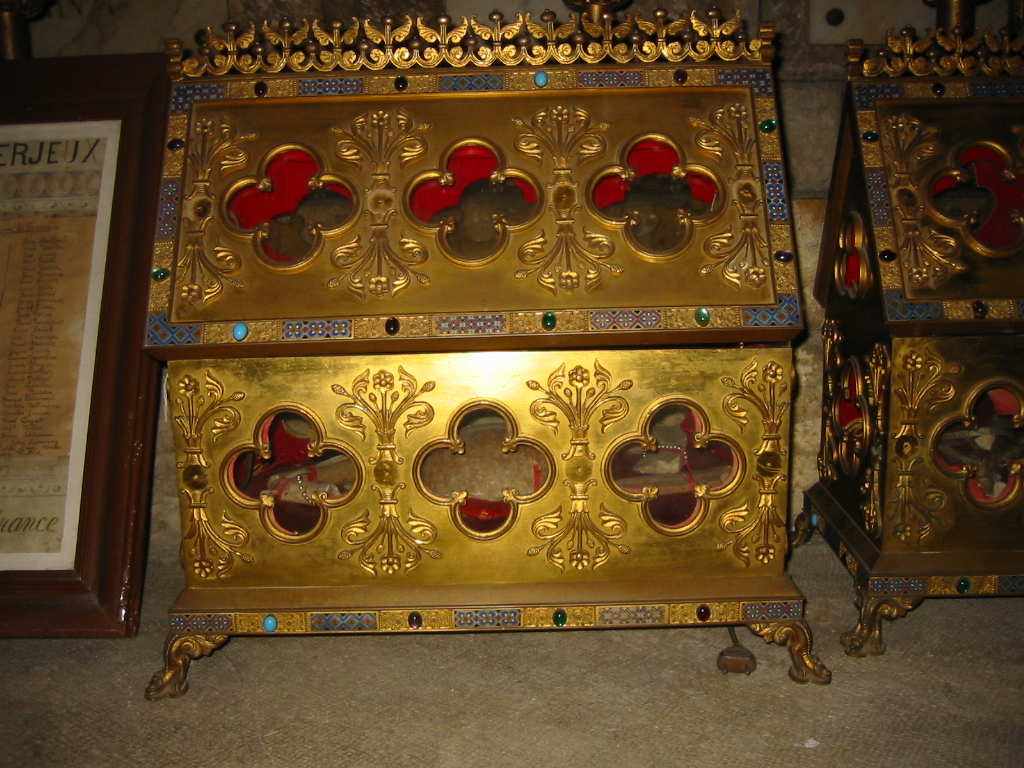
Reliqaury of St. Ferrution.

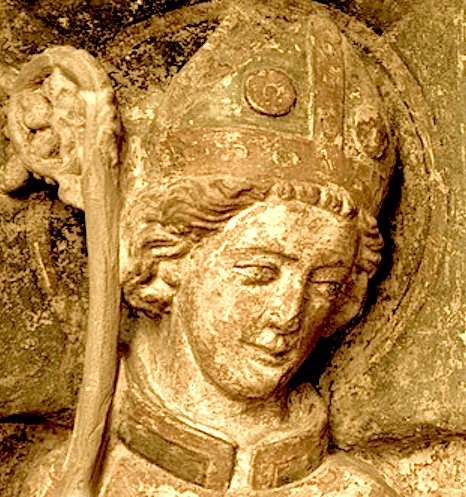
St. Aureus of Mainz.

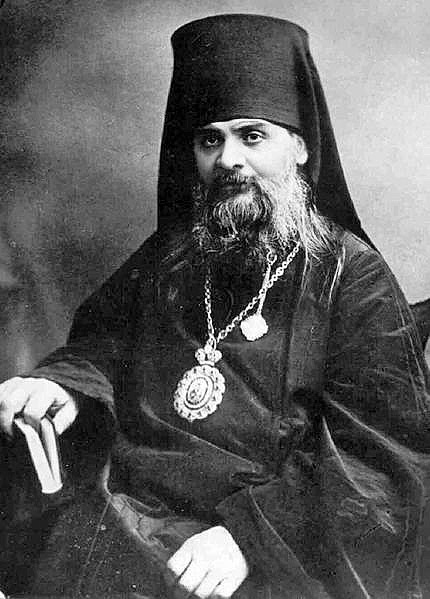
New Hieromartyr Hermogenes (Dolganyov), Bishop of Tobolsk.

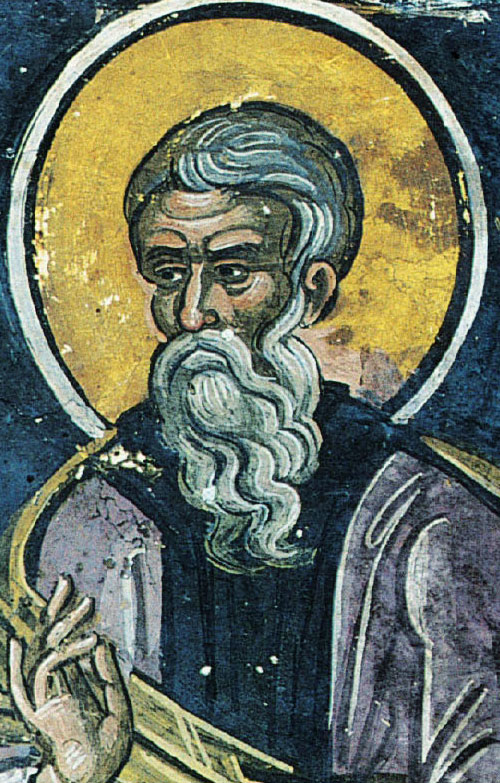
Venerable Theodore the Sykeote, Bishop of Anastasiopolis in Galatia.

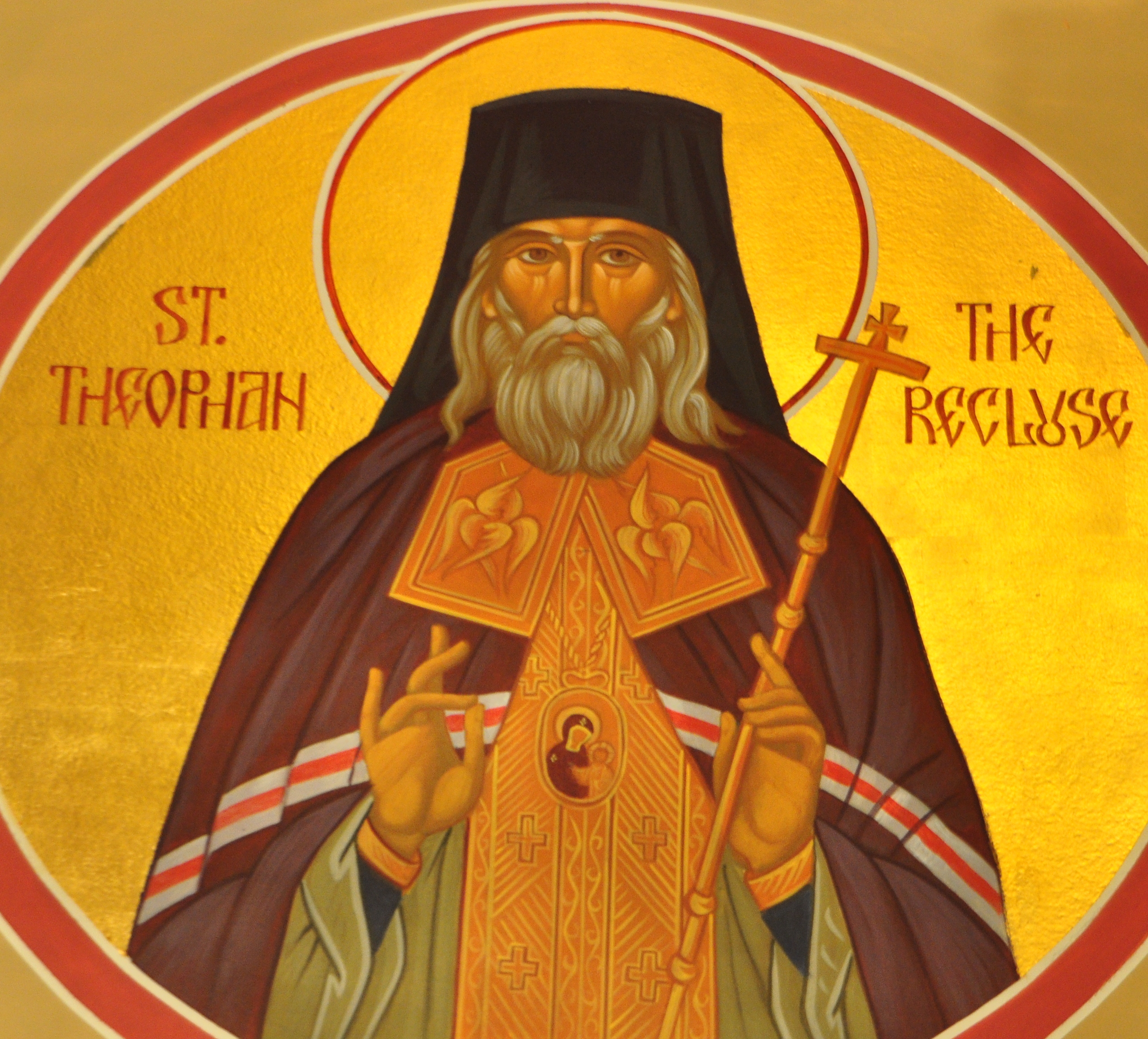
St. Theophan the Recluse, Bishop of Tambov.

== Sources ==
- June 16/29. Orthodox Calendar (PRAVOSLAVIE.RU).
- June 29 / June 16. HOLY TRINITY RUSSIAN ORTHODOX CHURCH (A parish of the Patriarchate of Moscow).
- June 16. OCA - The Lives of the Saints.
- The Autonomous Orthodox Metropolia of Western Europe and the Americas (ROCOR). St. Hilarion Calendar of Saints for the year of our Lord 2004. St. Hilarion Press (Austin, TX). p. 44.
- The Sixteenth Day of the Month of June. Orthodoxy in China.
- June 16. Latin Saints of the Orthodox Patriarchate of Rome.
- The Roman Martyrology. Transl. by the Archbishop of Baltimore. Last Edition, According to the Copy Printed at Rome in 1914. Revised Edition, with the Imprimatur of His Eminence Cardinal Gibbons. Baltimore: John Murphy Company, 1916. pp. 175–176.
- Rev. Richard Stanton. A Menology of England and Wales, or, Brief Memorials of the Ancient British and English Saints Arranged According to the Calendar, Together with the Martyrs of the 16th and 17th Centuries. London: Burns & Oates, 1892. p. 271.

Greek Sources

- Great Synaxaristes: (in Greek) 16 ΙΟΥΝΙΟΥ. ΜΕΓΑΣ ΣΥΝΑΞΑΡΙΣΤΗΣ.
- (in Greek) Συναξαριστής. 16 Ιουνίου. ECCLESIA.GR. (H ΕΚΚΛΗΣΙΑ ΤΗΣ ΕΛΛΑΔΟΣ).
- (in Greek) 16 Ιουνίου. Αποστολική Διακονία της Εκκλησίας της Ελλάδος (Apostoliki Diakonia of the Church of Greece).
- (in Greek) 16/06/2018. Ορθόδοξος Συναξαριστής.

Russian Sources

- (in Russian) 29 июня (16 июня). Православная Энциклопедия под редакцией Патриарха Московского и всея Руси Кирилла (электронная версия). (Orthodox Encyclopedia - Pravenc.ru).
- (in Russian) 16 июня по старому стилю / 29 июня по новому стилю. Русская Православная Церковь - Православный церковный календарь на 2017 год.
- (in Russian) 16 июня (ст.ст.) 29 июня 2014 (нов. ст.). Русская Православная Церковь Отдел внешних церковных связей. (DECR).
