= Ganos =

Ganos Gaziköy
- Neighbourhood
- Location in Turkey Ganos (Marmara)
- Coordinates: 40°44′52″N 27°19′55″E
- Country: Turkey
- Province: Tekirdağ
- District: Şarköy
- Population (2022): 372
- Time zone: UTC+3 (TRT)

Ganos (Greek: Γάνος), now known as Gaziköy, is a neighbourhood of the municipality and district of Şarköy, Tekirdağ Province, Turkey. Its population is 372 (2022). It is a historically important town, located on the Sea of Marmara, beneath the namesake Mount Ganos. It was known for its wine production. The wine was exported via the town's harbor and shipped throughout the Byzantine Empire and internationally. Although Ganos's wine trade declined under the Ottoman Empire, it continued to serve a more local market. The town was also a center of ceramics production through the late Ottoman period, especially during the 19th century.

Various ruins now mark the site of the old town, including traces of fortifications and several kilns. There were previously several old churches as well, but only the buildings' foundations are still extant. The present village of Gaziköy is located below the old town's acropolis.

The ancient site of Serrion Teichos may have been at or near Ganos.

== Name ==
The name Ganos is derived from nearby Mount Ganos. The settlement is now officially known as Gaziköy. Rarely, the form Gannos (Greek: Γάννος) is attested. The 12th-century geographer al-Idrisi rendered the town's name in Arabic as Qānūs. Ganos also appears in various European portolan charts, nautical charts, and descriptions of coasts under names such as Logam, Longam, Lo Gano, etc.

== Geography ==
Ganos is located on the Sea of Marmara, about 4.5 km (2.8 mi) north of Höşkoy (ancient Chora) and about 27 km southwest of Tekirdağ (ancient Rhaidestos). Overlooking the town is the namesake Mount Ganos. The coastal strip beneath the mountain is fertile and well-watered, and there are extensive clay deposits in the ground. This clay is "exceptionally pure and rich in minerals". The region's climate is well-suited to viticulture.

The settlement is divided into two parts. The acropolis was the core of the ancient settlement, while the lower surrounding area is the core of the village today.

== History ==
Ganos is already mentioned by the 4th century BCE; according to legend it was founded by settlers in the company of Byzas, founder of Byzantium. Pliny the Elder also mentioned Ganos in the 1st century CE. Little is known about the ancient Ganos. One local goddess, known as Thea Ganeia (Greek: Θέα Γάνεια), is attested in inscriptions. The 6th-century Synekdemos of Hierokles describe Ganos as a city (polis) in the province of Thrace, as does the De Thematibus of Constantine Porphyrogennetos in the early 10th century.

In 813, the Bulgars under Krum pillaged both Mount Ganos and the town below. Many people from the surrounding area had taken refuge here; they were either killed or taken as prisoners. In 914, another Bulgar raid under Tsar Symeon caused devastation in Ganos.

In the middle Byzantine period, Ganos was part of a major wine-growing region which covered the triangle between Ganos, Chora, and Melio. The vineyards may have been part of estates belonging to the monasteries on Mount Ganos. This monastic community is attested since at least the 10th century.

According to Armstrong and Günsenin, the growth of Ganos as a town was because of these vineyards producing wine for export — the town grew up around the harbor where the wine was shipped out. The wine was stored in amphorae manufactured in kilns along the coast, including in the town of Ganos. The earliest amphorae from Ganos are dated to the early 11th century. By the late 11th century, glazed ceramics were being produced at Ganos, possibly because of a population increase stimulating demand. Local ceramic production continued into the Ottoman period, with only a minor interruption in the early 14th century when the Catalan Company's raids damaged the surrounding region.

The 12th-century Arabic geographer al-Idrisi wrote favorably about the spacious streets and shops of Ganos and Panion. He gave the distance between Ganos and the inland town of Rusion as one day's journey.

There was another Bulgarian invasion in 1199. In 1204, the Partitio Imperii Romaniae assigned Ganos to the Venetians. During the period of Latin rule, the local wine production does not seem to have been interrupted. John III Doukas Vatatzes began campaigns against the Latins in the spring of 1235; these campaigns probably affected the hinterland of Ganos in some way. Ganos probably came under Byzantine control again at this point. In 1264, there was an incursion of Tatars and Bulgarians into eastern Thrace; the emperor Michael VIII Palaiologos was in the region at the time, and he embarked on ship at Ganos to go to Constantinople. In late December 1284, church officials from the diocese of Ganos wrote to the emperor Andronikos II Palaiologos and complained that cattle breeders in imperial service in the region between Kallipolis and Ganos were buying up supplies of grain at a cheap price and then reselling it overpriced.

The Catalan Company captured Ganos in July 1306, after years of incursions in the area. They remained in the city for about a year before heading west. In October or November 1326, Turkish raiders who had crossed the Propontis from Asia Minor, came and caused devastation in the region between Ganos and Rhaidestos. A severe earthquake happened on 6 November 1344, damaging Ganos and the nearby towns of Chora and Marmara. In the aftermath there was unrest in the area between supporters and opponents of Ioannes Kantakouzenos. After another earthquake damaged Ganos in 1354, the Ottomans were able to capture it.

Ceramic production was interrupted for a few decades after the Ottoman conquest, but then resumed on a smaller scale, as did wine growing.

In 1766 Ganos was hit by a severe earthquake. In 1877 the Ganos area was recorded as having about 5,400 Greek inhabitants. An earthquake in 1912 caused severe damage in Ganos and the village center was completely destroyed. In 1922 it had 1,037 Greek inhabitants.

== Monuments ==
On the eastern outskirts of the town, and on the beach, there are various chunks of marble structures whose function is unclear; these are probably from antiquity or the early Byzantine period. There is also a fountain in this area with an Ottoman-era inscription and two large fragments of ancient material, one of which may have originally been part of a sarcophagus lid.

In the village center, there is another fountain with an inscription dating from 1817, as well as the remains of two post-Byzantine churches.

On the acropolis above the present-day village, there are some remains of walls, as well as ruined buildings and many ceramic remains. As of 1922, it was reported that much of the fortifications, including both walls and towers, were in ruins. In the early 20th century there were three church buildings here. One was the Metropolis, which was dedicated to the Taxiarches (Archangels Michael and Gabriel) and is the religious building in the settlement. The other two were the Hagios Nikolaos and Hagios Charalampes churches. Another church, dedicated to the Theotokos or Laodegetria, stood in the lower town by the shore. The church of Hagios Charalampes was the site of storage of an 18th-century icon of St. Athanasios, which is one of the few surviving works of art that refer to the theologian's work on Mount Athos. A hagiasma of Hagia Paraskeve is also known in Ganos. As of 1999 there were still four allegedly post-Byzantine churches in the viciinity of Ganos, two of which were to the north of the town, which were likely the complexes of H. Paraskeve, H. Konstantinos, H. Elissaios, and H. Kyrillos, which in recent years have been torn down leaving only the foundation walls. Several other small churches (parekklesia) include the H. Menas, H. Ioannes Theologos, H. Elissaios, H. Demetrios, Panagia he Elaiousa, H. Aikatherina, and Zoodochos Pege. Somewhere near Ganos on the way to Eudemion, according to Germides, there was also a small "Koimesis tes Theotokou" with an old Marian church which was damaged by the Bulgarians in 1913 and completely destroyed in 1916; this may have been identical to the Theotokos church in Ganos.

In Ganos, many ancient and Byzantine inscriptions have been found, including a fragment of a metrical inscription from the 12th or 13th century. There are also remains of kilns dating to the Byzantine period, from the 10th-13th centuries.

== Economy ==
Large amounts of wine were produced at Ganos, as well as many amphorae were manufactured to store it. The town had an advantageous location for this trade, since the climate was good for viticulture, there was plenty of clay that could be used to produce the amphorae, and with harbor access for ease of export.

=== Wine ===
Ganos was especially known for its wine — the Suda, a 10th-century encyclopedia, referred to Ganos primarily as a type of wine and secondarily as a place. Ganos wine was a sweet wine, and according to the Ptochoprodromos it was above average in quality. Several shipwrecks in the region around Ganos, sometimes loaded with over 1,000 amphorae at a time, also attest to the importance of the city's wine trade. It was consumed in all corners of the empire, as well as internationally: Ganos amphorae have been found at Istanbul and Athens, on Crete and Cyprus, around the coast of Anatolia, and in southern Italy, the Levant, Egypt, and the Black Sea region. It was also traded inland to the north: Sarkel, Kievan Rus, and Lund and Sigtuna in present-day Sweden.

Although there is an abundance of archaeological evidence, texts do not say anything about the "organization of viticulture" at Ganos, such as who controlled the production of wine and amphorae, or who owned the ships used to transport it. Günsenin uses analogy to other documented monastic centers to conclude that the monastery likely played a significant role in the local wine industry. Like some monasteries, it may have owned its own ships and employed skilled shipbuilders in town, and it likely derived a significant amount of its income from wine production. The monastery is known to have had several metochia on Marmara Island, which likely were also used for wine production. The monastery's actual share of the local wine industry is unknown.

The area around Ganos is still used for wine production; there are various major wineries in the area such as Mey and Doluca as well as local, small-scale wineries like Melen and Ganos.

=== Ceramics ===
A particular type of amphora is associated with Ganos and its wine. These amphorae, which Nergis Günsenin classifies as "Günsenin I", are small, pear-shaped amphorae generally ranging from 28-48 cm in height and, unlike ancient Greek and Roman amphorae, without toes. The different sizes of Ganos amphorae may represent various multiples of some standard Byzantine unit of measurement. Kilns that produced these amphorae have been excavated at Ganos and nearby Chora, as well as two on Marmara Island (one at Saraylar and another at Topagaç), and there were probably also kilns producing similar amphorae at other sites throughout the wine-producing region on the northern coast of the Sea of Marmara. The kilns on Marmara Island probably used clay from Ganos itself. Günsenin I amphorae have been found alongside artifacts dated to the 11th and 12th centuries, indicating that they were made and used during at least that period.

Amphora production appears to have begun at Ganos in the early 11th century, at a time when its monastery was flourishing. By the late 11th century, glazed ceramics had begun to be produced at Ganos. This may be because of a combination of factors: increased demand and new technology. The increased demand would be from an increase in population — expanding wine production may have meant that new agricultural laborers were being employed, which meant more demand for pottery. As for the new technology, there was a shift in the type of flux used in ceramics production throughout the Byzantine world. Both fluxes were mostly lead, but the new one had less silica impurities, which allowed pottery firing at a lower temperature. Under the old method, glazed pottery production had required specialized, fairly sophisticated kilns capable of reaching higher temperatures, but now glazed ceramics could be produced in the same basic kilns used to produce unglazed ceramics. As a result, more places throughout the Byzantine world started producing glazed ceramics in the late 11th century; Ganos was one such place.

Although Kufesque motifs were very common in Byzantine pottery during this period, nothing from Ganos has been found with those designs — instead, they were decorated with simple linear designs or, sometimes, dots. This may indicate that it was intended for "local circulation" instead of export.

Ceramic production does not seem to have been interrupted by the Venetian rule in the early 1200s, but a later gap may have been caused by Catalan raids around 1300. This evidently continued into the early Ottoman period, as decreased wine production meant less demand for the ceramics. Ganos continued to produce amphorae in the Ottoman period, although for a more local market.

In the 19th century, glazed ceramic production at Ganos was "flourishing"; many vessels were shipped to Istanbul, while others were traded further away. Most 19th-century glazed ware from Ganos was monochrome. The most common color was green, followed by yellow. The glazes were generally thick and high-quality and applied over an also thick and high-quality white slip. 19th-century glazed Ganos ware is restricted to a few forms; mainly bowls, jugs, and cooking pots.

== Christian diocese ==
Until the late 13th century, Ganos was still an ordinary diocese, subordinate to the metropolitan of Herakleia. In 1324, Ganos was elevated to an archbishopric (along with a donation of 50 hyperpera paid to the patriarch of Constantinople). It held the status of metropolitan diocese by December 1329, when its metropolitan Menas was listed among the participants in a synod in Constantinople. In 1347 the see was assumed by the Metropolitan of Cyzicus, whose church faced decline after Ottoman conquest. Various metropolitans of Ganos are attested in the 14th and 15th centuries, as late as 1561. Sometime after that, Ganos was merged with nearby Chora to form an eparchy called Ganos kai Chora or Ganochora. This is listed in a 1715 register as one of the 5 metropolitan dioceses of eastern Thrace, and also in a text from 1855.
