= Akakios the Younger =

Greek Orthodox Christian saint and hermit

Saint Akakios the Younger
- Born: Anastasios; 1630s Agios Akakios, Karditsa
- Residence: Mount Athos
- Died: 12 April 1730; Mount Athos
- Venerated in: Eastern Orthodox Church
- Major shrine: Cave of Saint Akakios, Kafsokalyvia, Mount Athos
- Feast: April 12
- Tradition or genre: Athonite Monasticism, Hesychasm

Saint Acacius or Akakios the Younger, also known as Akakios the New of Kafsokalyvia (Greek: Ακάκιος ο Νέος, ο Καυσοκαλυβίτης; 1630s – 12 April 1730) was a Greek Orthodox Christian monk and ascetic who lived on Mount Athos. His feast day is celebrated by the Eastern Orthodox Church on April 12.

== Biography ==
He was born Anastasios sometime in the 1630s in Golitsa (now Agios Akakios (Άγιος Ακάκιος)), Karditsa. At the age of 23, he moved to Zagora, Volos and joined the Monastery of Sourvia. There, he received his tonsure and took on the monastic name of Akakios (Ακάκιος).

In the 1660s, Akakios moved to the southern tip of Mount Athos and lived as a hermit in the Cave of Maximos of Kafsokalyvia near the Skete of Kafsokalyvia. There, Akakios had many divine visions in which he was visited by Maximos of Kafsokalyvia. He also spent time at the Monastery of Dionysiou and the Skete of Pantokratoros.

He was also a spiritual mentor to the Neomartyr saints Romanos (feast day: January 5), Pachomios (May 6), and Nikodimos (July 11).

Akakios practiced intense asceticism and was said to have eaten dry grass crushed with a piece of marble, rather than bread. In his later years, he moved down from the higher cliffs to a cave near the Skete of Kafsokalyvia. Today, this cave is named after him.

In 1725, Vasil Grigorovich-Barsky visited Akakios and wrote an account of him.

He died on April 12, 1730, and was said to have foretold his own death shortly before then.

== Relics and sites ==
His relics are kept in the Monastery of Dionysiou and in Kafsokalyvia.

A spring in Kafsokalyvia is also known as the Holy Water of Saint Akakios. Fresh spring water was found there when Saint Akakios prayed while a man was digging for it.
