= Niphon Kausokalybites =

Eastern Orthodox saint and monk

Saint Niphon Kausokalybites Όσιος Νήφων Καυσοκαλυβίτης
- Born: 1316; Lukovë, Himarë municipality, Albania
- Died: 1411
- Venerated in: Eastern Orthodox Church
- Feast: 14 June
- Major works: biography of Maximos Kausokalybites

Niphon Kausokalybites (Greek: Όσιος Νήφων Καυσοκαλυβίτης, 1316–1411) was a Greek Orthodox Christian saint and monk. He is celebrated by the Eastern Orthodox Church on June 14.

== Early life ==
A Greek, Niphon was born in the village of Lukovë, Himarë municipality, that time part of the Despotate of Epirus (modern south Albania). From an early age he went to the monastery of Geromerion (near Filiates) where he became a hesychast. Soon after he moved to the nearby monastery of Mesopotam, where he became a monk.

== Monastic life ==
Niphon went to the monastic state of Mount Athos sometime after 1335, where he dedicated himself to asceticism, under the guidance of the monastic Elders, Neilos Erichiotes, Theognostos and Maximos Kausokalybites. In 1345, Niphon was the protos of Mount Athos. At that time Athos came under the protection of the Serbian Tsar Stefan Dušan, who accused him for heresy and Bogomilism, but he was successfully defended by Gregory Palamas. In 1347-8 Niphon was tried and deposed from his position as protos after being accused by fellow monks of heresy. He was succeeded by the Serbian monk Antonios. His deposition is regarded as either part of the struggles between rival religious factions that predated the Serbian control of the Athonite community or attempts of Stefan Dušan to gain control of Athos by appointing a Serbian official as its head. This intervention resulted in serious contradictions between the Greek dignitaries and the Serbs of Hilandar monastery of Athos.

During 1355-63 he was again accused of heresy when his servant Bardarius revealed before dying that he had joined the Euchite movement, but was defended by Patriarch Callistus. It is considered unclear from contemporary accounts whether Niphon was a Euchite or Hesychast at that time. Niphon lived the rest of his life as a hesychast, until his death in 1411.

== Works ==
Niphon was also the author of the first biography of Maximos Kausokalybites, his spiritual tutor.

== Dedications ==
A church dedicated to Saint Niphon was erected in February 2013 at Gjirokastër, southern Albania.

== See also ==
- Maximos of Kafsokalyvia
- Kafsokalyvia
