= Mount Ganos =

Mountain in Tekirdağ Province, Turkey

- Işıklar Dağı

Highest point
- Elevation: 945 m (3,100 ft)
- Coordinates: 41°00′35″N 27°30′58″E

Geography
- Location: Tekirdağ Province
- Country: Turkey

Mount Ganos (Greek: Όρος Γάνος), today known as Işıklar Dağı in Turkish, is a mountain in eastern Thrace, on the European side of modern-day Turkey. It rises up from the western shore of the Sea of Marmara.

The mountain was home to Christian monks and ascetics during the Byzantine period. Byzantine Christian monks and clergymen who lived on the mountain included Patriarch Athanasius I of Constantinople and Maximos of Kafsokalyvia.

== Geography ==
Mount Ganos is basically a small mountain range that runs northeast-southwest at an approximately 70° angle. Its length in this direction is about 35 km, its width ranges from about 8 to 11 km, and its summit is 924 m above sea level.

On the north side, Mount Ganos rises abruptly from the Thracian plain. To the east is the Sea of Marmara, where the northern edge of the undersea Tekirdağ Basin also rises up sharply to form Mount Ganos's eastern flank. The mountain's southwestern end falls away steeply toward the Gulf of Saros, with the slope in some places reaching up to 50°.

Ganos is a steep mountain — the average slope is 24%, and over half of the mountain's surface area has a slope between 10-40°.

Two streams cut through Mount Ganos, flowing to the west.

=== Climate ===
Generally, Mount Ganos has a semi-humid climate typical of the Marmara region. Because of its altitude, the mountain experiences cooler temperatures and receives more rainfall than the plains below. Its average annual temperature is less than 10 °C and its average yearly rainfall is more than 1000 mm.

=== Soil ===
The mountain's soil is predominantly classified as the xeric moisture regime and the thermic temperature regime. These conditions have led to the formation of various soil orders, including alfisols, andisols, entisols, inceptisols, and mollisols.

=== Specific areas ===
To the northeast of Mount Ganos is the Naip Plain, a flat alluvial plain surrounding the Ana Dere river. The plain covers some 500 hectares. Geologically, this area was once a river estuary, and has now been filled in by river sedimentation. In the present day, a lot of irrigated farming is done on the plain. Open-pit mining is also done on the plain to produce raw materials for brick factories.

The mountain's hiking and paragliding routes start near the village of Yeniköy, which is an area largely used for farming and animal husbandry.

Rapid erosion has taken place in one area in the upper Kavak River basin in the 21st century. Rills that formed around 2004 developed into gullies by 2011, and the rate of erosion has increased even more since then.

== Geology ==
Mount Ganos forms an area of "anomalous" uplift at the end of the Ganos Fault, which it runs parallel to. The mountain is primarily composed of sandstone and shale. It is interpreted as the steep southern part of a monocline, with the lower plains to the north forming the other part. It was formed by slipping along the North Anatolian Fault. On a geologic time scale, the mountain is gradually moving eastward, while at the same time undergoing subsidence along the Central Anatolia Fault (which is part of the North Anatolian Fault) and being covered up by sedimentation in the Tekirdağ Basin. This process has been going on for at least the last 2 million years, and has resulted in the mountain being moved eastward by at least 40 km.

Four major geological formations have been identified as making up Mount Ganos: the Gaziköy Formation (the oldest), the Keşan Formation, the Mezardere Formation, and then finally the Osmancık Formation (the youngest). These formations are primarily exposed on the south side of the mountain.

== Ecology ==
Due to the prevailing Mediterranean climate, the plant species that grow on Mount Ganos are characteristic of the Mediterranean region.

=== Wetlands ===
There are some wetland areas along ponds and streams, mainly in the vicinity of Yeniköy, Yazır and Işıklar. These areas have non-calcareous brown forest soil and plants that require high humidity grow here. Trees and shrubs like Platanus orientalis, Salix alba, Phillyrea latifolia, and Rubus sanctus grow in areas along bodies of water. In the "sunny openings" near the wetlands, herbaceous plants grow, the most common plants that grow are Lamium purpureum (var. maculatum), Ranunculus constantinopolitanus, Rumex crispus, Scirpus sylvaticus, and Alisma aquatica. Of these, Scirpus sylvaticus is the most common. Other plants that are less common are Arundo donax, Clematis vitalba, Convolvulus arvensis and Lycopus europaeus.

These wetlands experience pressure from human activities, especially near Yazır.

=== Meadows ===
Meadows are mainly found on the flat, fertile plains at the foot of the mountain, often in places where former oak forests have been cleared to make space for farmland. These areas tend to have non-calcareous brown soil to the wetlands. The Naip plain, which has alluvial soil, is especially rich in species diversity. Like other meadow areas, this area faces destruction and conversion into farmland. The meadow flora mainly consists of herbaceous species under the families Poaceae and Asteraceae. The dominant species is Lolium perenne; other common plants in the meadow biome include Anthemis cretica, Avena sterilis, Bromus ramosus, Cynosurus echinatus and Hordeum murinum (subspecies glaucum).

=== Maquis and garrigue shrubland ===
Large areas of maquis shrubland exist in coastal areas where the sea makes the climate more temperate. Herbaceous flora is less common in this biome, but there is a rich array of flowering plants. The predominant tree and shrub species are Cistus parviflorus, Juniperus oxycedrus (subspecies oxycedrus), Paliurus spina-christi, Phillyrea latifolia and Spartium junceum. Among the lower-lying plants, the most common is Glaucium flavum; other species include Avena barbata (subspecies barbata), Crupina vulgaris, Hordeum murinum (subspecies leporinum), Hypericum perforatum, and Lolium perenne.

Many maquis areas are close to areas of human settlement and subject to being tampered with. In these areas, various ruderal species occur, especially herbaceous plants. These include Centaurea calcitrapa (var. calcitrapa), Psorolea bituminosa, Scabiosa atropurpurea, Echium angustifolium, Euphorbia falcata, Plantago lagopus, Rumex conglomeratus and Rumex crispus.

There are also areas of garrigue shrubland on "the inside of the skirts" of Mount Ganos. These areas cover more arid and rocky hills, and their plants are adapted to drier environments. The plants tend to be low-profile and are often thorny or hairy. Morina persica and Digitalis lanata are widespread in these areas; they tend to grow in single-species clusters.

=== Coniferous forest ===
Natural coniferous forests on Mount Ganos are mostly predominated by Pinus brutia, also known as the Turkish pine. The Turkish pine is a congenial species, not very picky about the type of soil it will grow in, although on Mount Ganos it grows most commonly on the eastern side of the mountain, on slopes facing the sea. These areas tend to have bedrock dominated by sandstone, claystone, and siltstone. Most of the plant species in the Pinus brutia forests are also found in the maquis shrubland. Besides Pinus brutia, the trees Cistus parviflorus, Juniperus oxycedrus (subspecies oxycedrus), Phillyrea latifolia, Spartium junceum, Pistacia terebinthus (subspecies terebinthus), and Quercus petraea (subspecies petraea) grow in this biome. The most common herbaceous plant is Hypericum perforatum; others include Centaurea calcitrapa (var. calcitrapa), Hordeum murinum (subspecies glaucum), Lolium perenne, Psorolea bituminosa, and Scabiosa atropurpurea. In areas affected by human activity, there are also some ruderal species like Datura stramonium and Malva neglecta; as well as Psorolea bituminosa and Scabiosa atropurpurea, which both are also found throughout this biome. In some places, particularly along the coast and in valleys, the Pinus brutia forests are under pressure from human activity.

Afforestation has resulted in the growth of two new types of pine forest environments. These are predominated by Pinus nigra (subspecies pallasiana) and Pinus pinea, respectively. Their area is small compared to natural Pinus brutia forests.

Pinus nigra grows in scattered tree plantations throughout the area, often mixed with other tree types. This species is resistant to winter cold and drought and mostly grows in inland areas with brown forest soil. Other trees include Carpinus orientalis and Quercus robur (subspecies robur). This is often accompanied by maquis vegetation like Pistacia terebinthus (subspecies terebinthus), Cistus parviflorus, Juniperus oxycedrus (subspecies oxycedrus) and Spartium junceum. Herbaceous plants are low in both density and species diversity; the prevalent species in this group is Lolium perenne.

Recent afforestation efforts, particularly in coastal areas with a mild climate, has tended to prefer Pinus pinea. These forests are still young, and many of the pine trees are still basically just shrubs. They are accompanied by maquis trees such as Juniperus oxycedrus (subspecies oxycedrus), Pistacia terebinthus (subspecies terebinthus) and Cistus parviflorus. The relatively light woody plant cover allows a diverse array of herbaceous plants to grow here. The most common is Trifolium pretense; others are Anthemis tinctoria, Avena sterilis, Hordeum murinum (subspecies glaucum), Poa trivialis, Scabiosa atropurpurea, and Torilis arvensis.

=== Broadleaf forests ===
Dry and semi-moist broadleaf forests are found especially in upland regions of Mount Ganos. Several distinct broadleaf forest ecosystems exist on Mount Ganos, based on the predominant type of tree. Oak forests are the most common; they occupy large areas where the climate is temperate, especially on the south side of the mountain. Hornbeam forests occur in a more limited range on the northern face, as well as damp riverbeds throughout the area. Linden forests with a diverse mixture of tree species are found in localized patches, particularly on slopes with a mild maritime climate.

==== Oak forests ====
To the south, maquis shrubland gives way to extensive oak forests. These forests span a range of elevations starting at sea level and continuing up onto the mountain. Various oak species populate these forests: Quercus frainetto, Quercus infectoria, Quercus robur (subspecies robur), and Quercus petraea (subspecies petraea). Other tree species are also mixed in; some areas contain a mix of broadleaf and coniferous trees, while others are unmixed broadleaf forests.

In the unmixed broadleaf forest areas, Acer campestre (subspecies campestre), Carpinus orientalis, and Sorbus torminalis (var. torminalis) grow among the predominant oak trees. Particularly in coastal areas, maquis tree species are also mixed in: Pistacia terebinthus (subspecies terebinthus), Cistus parviflorus, Juniperus oxycedrus (subspecies oxycedrus), Phillyrea latifolia, and Spartium junceum. The unmixed forests tend to have open space between trees, allowing the growth of diverse herbaceous plants in the understory. The most common herbaceous plant in these areas is Lolium perenne. Other herbaceous species are Agrostis gigantea, Avena barbata (subspecies barbata), Centaurea calcitrapa (var. calcitrapa), Dactylis glomerata, Hypericum perforatum, Muscari comosum, and Psorolea bituminosa.

The mixed-leaf forests tend to grow in areas with non-calcareous brown forest soil overlying bedrock made of sandstone, claystone, and siltstone. Closer to the coast, the temperature tends to be milder; in these areas, the predominant oak trees are accompanied by Olea europaea (var. europaea), Pinus brutia, and Pistacius terebinthus (var. terebinthus). Further inland, where the temperatures get colder, more species join the mix: Acer campestre (subspecies campestre), Carpinus orientalis, Fraxinus ornus, and Platanus orientalis. Herbaceous plant growth covers about 60% of the mixed-leaf forests' area and, like the unmixed forests, is dominated by Lolium perenne. Other herbaceous species in these areas include Agrostis stolonifera, Anthemis tinctoria (var. tinctoria), Briza maxima, Glaucium flavum, Helianthemum nummularium, Origanum vulgare, Phleum subulatum, Psorolea bituminosa, Rapistrum rugosum, and Scabiosa atropurpurea.

In some places, the oak forests have been destroyed by human activity, turning them into maquis shrubland. In these areas, the typical maquis species are accompanied by ruderal species such as Centaurea calcitrapa (var. calcitrapa), Crepis vesicaria, Plantago lanceolata, Psorolea bituminosa, Euphorbia amygdaloides (var. amygdaloides), Malva sylvestris, Cirsium italicum, Dactylis glomerata (subspecies hispanica), and Hypericum perforatum. Because of the low tree cover, there is thick growth of grassy plants, and a high diversity of species. The predominant species is Lolium perenne.

==== Hornbeam forests ====
Forests predominated by Carpinus orientalis, the eastern hornbeam, are less common on Mount Ganos than oak forests. Other tree species mixed in include Acer campestre (subspecies campestre), Fraxinus ornus, and Quercus robur (subspecies robur). The tree and shrub cover in these hornbeam forests is extensive, which inhibits growth of herbaceous plants below. The predominant species of this layer is Torilis arvensis. Other species include Anthemis cretica, Cirsium baytopae, Digitalis lanata, Melilotus alba, Onopordum tauricum, and Raphanus rapistrum.

==== Linden forests ====
Locally, there are patches of forest where the main species is Tilia argentea, the silver linden. These grow in brown forest soils on bedrock containing a mixture of sandstone, claystone, and siltstone. The lindens are mixed in with oak, ash, and hornbeam trees. Shrubs include Ligustrum vulgare, Rosa canina, Rubus hirtus, and Smilax excelsa, but their coverage rate is relatively low, allowing herbaceous plants to grow in the understory. The dominant herbaceous plant species is Ranunculus constantinopolitanus; other common species include Anthemis cretica, Brachypodium sylvaticum, Centaurea calcitrapa (var. calcitrapa), Cynosurus echinatus, Euphorbia helioscopia, Geraniaum molle, Hypericum bithynicum, Lolium perenne, Poa trivialis, and Trifolium campestre. Asperula tenella and Cardamine pratensis are more rarely seen.
