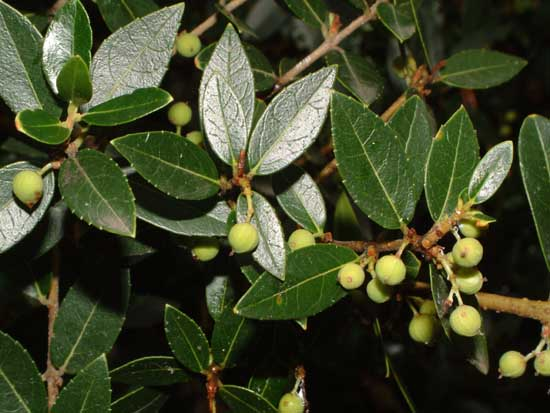
- Phillyrea latifolia

Scientific classification
- Kingdom: Plantae
- Clade: Tracheophytes
- Clade: Angiosperms
- Clade: Eudicots
- Clade: Asterids
- Order: Lamiales
- Family: Oleaceae
- Tribe: Oleeae
- Subtribe: Oleinae
- Genus: Phillyrea; L.

Type species
- Phillyrea latifolia L.

= Phillyrea =

Genus of plant

Phillyrea is a genus of two species of flowering plants in the family Oleaceae, native to the Mediterranean region, and naturalized in the Canary Islands and Madeira.

They are evergreen shrubs or small trees growing to 3–9 m tall, related to Ligustrum, Olea and Osmanthus. The leaves are in opposite pairs, small, leathery, ovate to lanceolate, 2–6 cm long and 0.5–2 cm broad. The flowers are small, greenish-white, produced in short clusters. The fruit is a drupe containing a single seed.

== Species ==
- Phillyrea angustifolia L. - native to western and central Mediterranean Basin, Portugal to Albania.
- Phillyrea latifolia L. - native to entire Mediterranean Basin, Portugal to Syria.

A third species P. decora from the Caucasus is now usually treated in the genus Osmanthus as Osmanthus decorus. Over 200 other names have been proposed over the years, now considered synonyms of existing taxa.
