= Serrion Teichos =

Greek city in ancient Thrace

Coordinates: 40°45′02″N 27°19′28″E

Serrion Teichos (Ancient Greek: Σέρριον τείχος) or Serreion Teichos (Σέρρειον τεῖχος) was a Greek city in ancient Thrace, located in the region of the Propontis. It was a member of the Delian League and appears in tribute lists of Athens between 428/7 and 418/7 BCE. It later bore the name of Ganus or Ganos (Γάνος or Γᾶνος). It is under this name that the town is mentioned by geographers and historians, as a noted mountain fortress of Thrace.

Its site is near the modern Ganos, Turkey.

== See also ==
- Greek colonies in Thrace
