= Panagia Mesopantitisa =

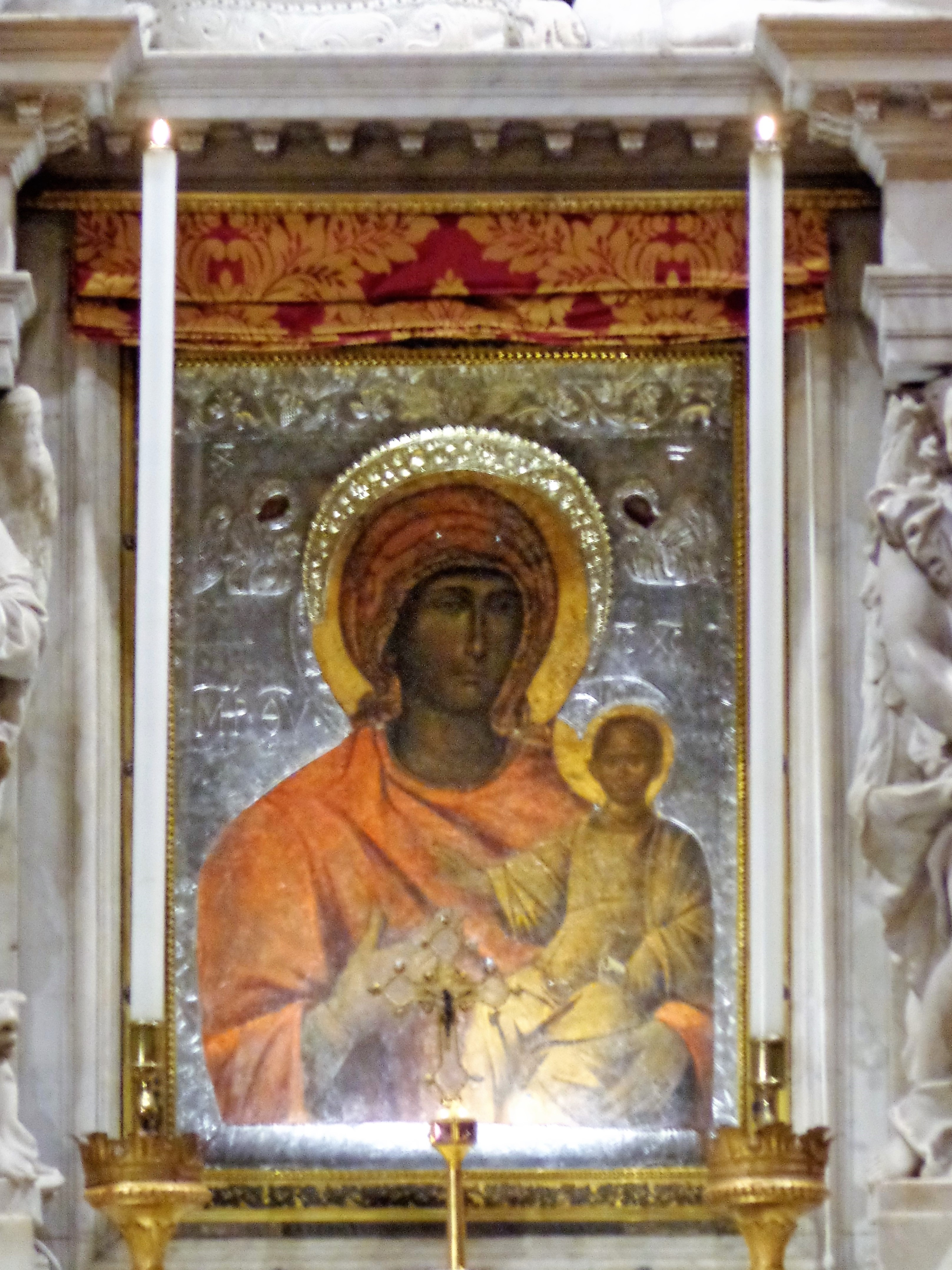

Madonna della Salute or Panagia Mesopantitisa (Greek: Μεσοπαντητίσσης, "Madonna the mediator" or "Madonna the negotiator") is a 12th-century Byzantine icon of Hodegetria type now in main altar of Santa Maria della Salute in Venice.

This icon was the protector of the city of Candia (now Heraklion) on the island of Crete. According to legend it was supposed to be painted by the Saint Luke and in the 8th century, during the period of iconoclasm, it was brought from Constantinople to Crete to protect it from destruction by heretics.

During the Venetian rule in Crete, the icon was kept in the Church of the Apostle Titus in Handak (Heraklion), and prayers were held before it every Tuesday.

The icon was moved from the city of Candia after the occupation of Ottoman Empire to the city of Venice by Francesco Morosini in 1669 and arrived in 1670.

A copy of the icon, considered miraculous in Orthodoxy, is currently housed in the Church of the Apostle Titus in Heraklion. The icon is celebrated in Orthodoxy on January 12 and 13.
