= Kafsokalyvia =

Kafsokalyvia Καυσοκαλύβια
- Settlement
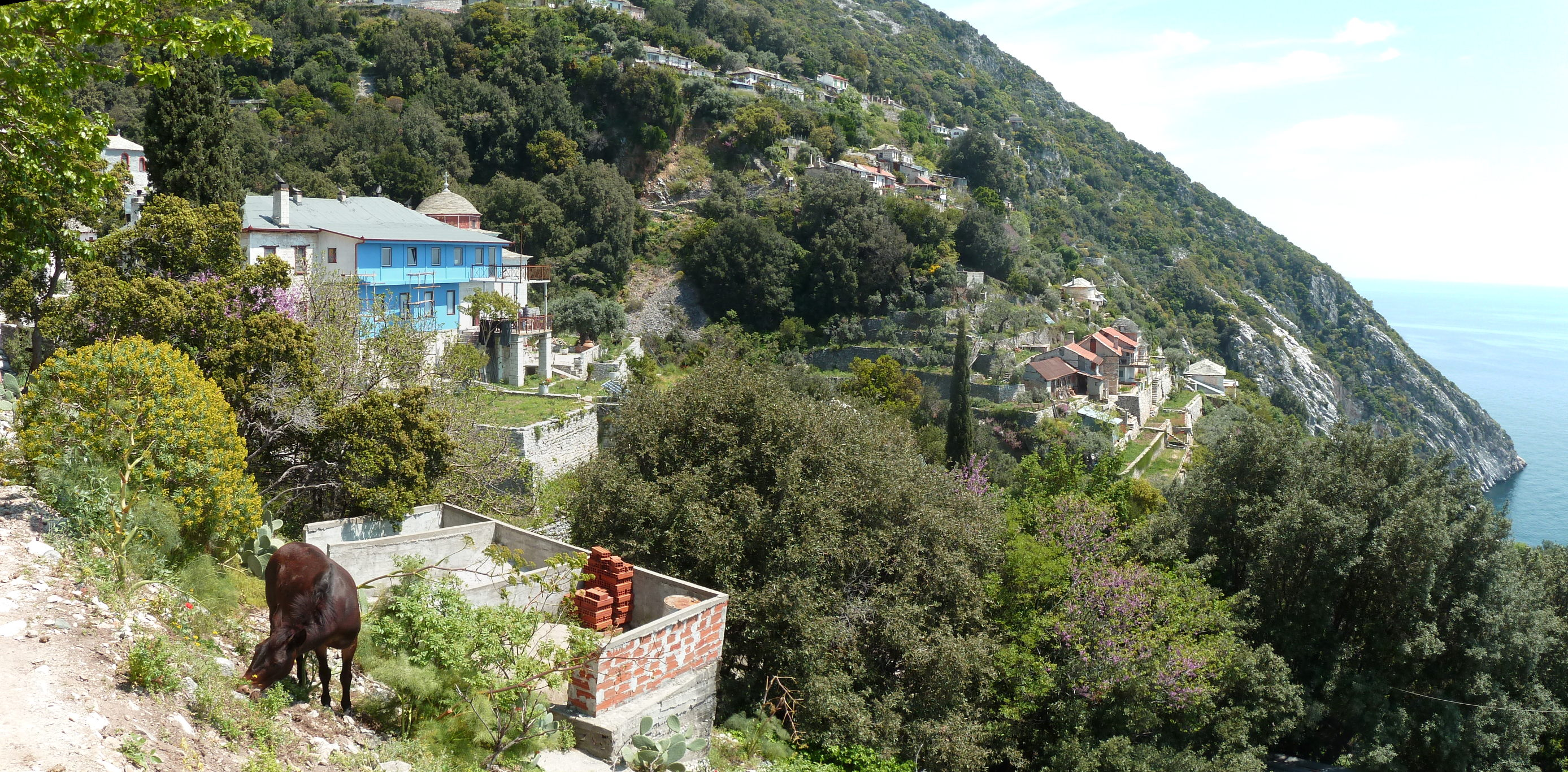
- View of Kafsokalyvia

- Location within Greece
- Coordinates: 40°07′46″N 24°20′26″E
- Country: Greece
- Administrative region: Mount Athos

Population (2021)
  - Total: 25
- Time zone: UTC+2 (EET)
  - Summer (DST): UTC+3 (EEST)

Kafsokalyvia (Greek: Καυσοκαλύβια, lit. 'burning hut') is a settlement and idiorrhythmic skete located on Mount Athos. It is located at the southern edge of the Athos peninsula. Kafsokalyvia is named after Maximos Kausokalybites ("Maximos the Hut Burner"), a 14th-century Christian hermit.

It is also known as the Holy Trinity Skete (Greek: Σκήτη Αγίας Τριάδος, romanized: Skiti Agias Triados).

There are 40 cells in Kafsokalyvia, not all of which are occupied. As of 2014, there were 35 monks living at Kafsokalyvia (Speake 2014). The population at the 2021 census was 25.

A regular ferry service connects the port of Kafsokalyvia with Dafni, the main port of Mount Athos.

== List of cells ==
List of cells and other buildings in Kafsokalyvia:

- Ag. Georgios (Αγ Γεωργίου)
- Ypapanti tou Christou (Υπαπαντής του Χριστού)
- Analypseos (Αναλήψεως)
- Neomartyres (Νεομαρτύρων)
- Kimiseos Agias Annis (Κοιμήσεως Αγίας Αννης)
- Ag. Efstathios (Αγ Ευσταθίου)
- Ag. Dimitrios (Αγ Δημητρίου)
- Ag. Georgios (Αγ Γεωργίου)
- Archangeli (Αρχαγγέλων)
- Ag. Methodios (Αγ Μεθοδίου)
- Ag. Pachomios (Αγ Παχωμίου)
- Zoodochos Pigi (Ζωοδόχου Πηγής)
- Ag. Charalambos (Αγ Χαραλάμπους)
- Ag. Maximos (Αγ Μαξίμου)
- Evangelismos (Ευαγγελισμού)
- Genesion Theotokou (Γενεσίου Θεοτόκου)
- Ag. Skepi (Αγ Σκεπής)
- Ag. Pateres (Αγιορειτών Πατέρων)
- Ag. Akakios (Αγ Ακακίου)
- Ag. Panteleimonon (Αγ Παντελεήμονος)
- Ag. Ioasaf (Αγ Ιωασάςο)
- Ag. Symeon (Αγ Συμεών)
- Imionos (Ημίονος)
- Ag. Ioannis o Theologos (Αγ Ιωάννου του Θεολόγου)
- Isodia Theotokou (Εισοδίων Θεοτόκου)
- Ag. Apostoli (Αγ Αποστόλων)
- Kimisis Theotokou (Κοιμήσεως Θεοτόκου)
- Metamorphoseos (Μεταμορφώσεως)
- Treis Ierarches (Τριών Ιεραρχών)
- Evangelismos (Ευαγγελισμού)

== Notable people ==
Notable monks who have lived at Kafsokalyvia include:

- Maximos of Kafsokalyvia
- Niphon of Kafsokalyvia
- Akakios the Younger
- Porphyrios of Kafsokalyvia
- Hadji-Georgis the Athonite
