= Maximos of Kafsokalyvia =

14th-century Eastern Orthodox saint

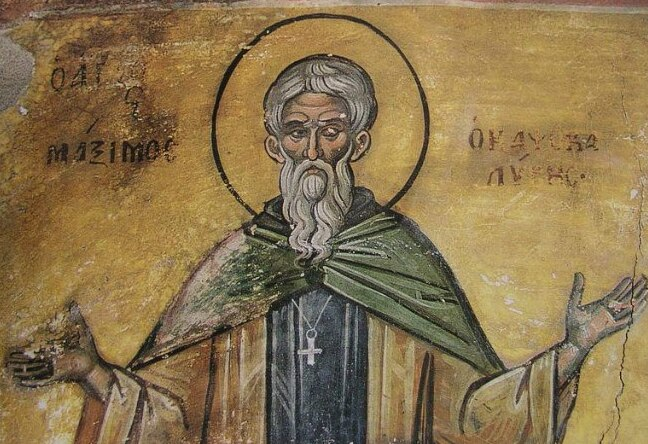
- Born: between 1272–1285; Lampsacus
- Died: 1365 or 1380; Mount Athos
- Venerated in: Eastern Orthodox Church
- Feast: January 13 (26)

Maximos of Kafsokalyvia or Maximos Kausokalybis (Greek: Μάξιμος Καυσοκαλύβης; died 1365 or 1380; also spelled Kafsokalyvis, from "of the burning hut"), also known as St. Maximos the Hut Burner, was a hesychast monk who lived on Mount Athos in Greece. Some of Maximos' writings on prayer and ascetism are included in the Philokalia.

He is celebrated by the Eastern Orthodox Church on January 13 (26).

== Biography ==
According to Theophanes of Vatopedi, Maximos was born Manuel (his baptismal name) into an aristocratic family in Lampsacus, a town on the Hellespont. He was born sometime between 1272 and 1285.

The stories of Maximos's life recount that, as a child, he was devoted to the Virgin Mary and gave his food and clothing to the poor. When his parents arranged his marriage at age 17, he instead moved to Mount Ganos, where he became the student of an elderly monk. Around this time he began his life of austerity, sleeping on the ground, staying awake for long periods, and fasting. He also spent time as a monk at Mount Papikion.

After his spiritual father died, he went to Constantinople, spending a year in the city, where he acted as a "holy fool," pretending to be mad while living in the gateway of a famous church.

Maximos then settled at the Great Lavra. During his time there, he experienced three divine visions from the Virgin Mary, who told Maximos to ascend the summit of Mount Athos. After the third vision, Maximos finally obeyed and climbed up to the summit of Mount Athos, where he spent three days before receiving a vision of the Virgin Mary, who told him to remain on Mount Athos. Thus began around ten years of wandering. Maximos lived an austere life, mostly as a recluse in crude shelters, moving from time to time to seek further seclusion. He wore only a single piece of clothing, lived on a diet of wild nuts and berries, and would regularly burn down his hut as he moved on to new locations. His habit of burning his old hut when it was time to move resulted in his nickname "The Hut-Burner."

He continued this lifestyle for about ten years until his meeting with the renowned hesychast monk Gregory of Sinai, after which Maximos discontinued his nomadic lifestyle and lived as an ascetic in a hut for fourteen years.

At Mount Athos, he was a close associate of Gregory of Sinai. During his life, he was held in high repute as a holy man and spiritual adviser, admired for his austerity, and a reputation for clairvoyance, prophecy, healing, and exorcizing demons. Legend had him seen flying in the air, turning seawater into drinking water, and more.

Circa 1350, the Byzantine emperors John VI Kantakouzenos and John V Palaiologos visited Maximos.

Patriarch Callistus I of Constantinople, who was a monk and disciple of Gregory of Sinai at Mount Athos for 28 years, once passed through Mount Athos on his way to Serbia and met Maximos, who greeted the Patriarch in a seemingly humorous manner, "This old man will never see his old lady again." This turned out to be a prophecy of how Kallistos would never see Constantinople ("his old lady") again, since he would die before being able to return there. Maximos then bid farewell to Kallistos by chanting, "Blessed are the blameless in the way" (from Psalm 118, a funeral psalm). Kallistos subsequently journeyed on to Serbia, where he then died.

During his final years, Maximos gave his hut to Niphon Kausokalybites and moved closer to the Great Lavra so that he could hear its bells. At his request, he was buried in a grave that he dug himself. The present-day skete of Kapsokalyvia is named after him. In spite of his desire for seclusion and obscurity, four writers later wrote vitae on his life and teachings. These include The Life of Maximos by Theophanes and a vitae by his disciple Niphon Kausokalybites.

== Hagiographies ==
There are a few different hagiographies of Maximos the Hutburner. One (MS BHG1236z) was written by the hieromonk Niphon of Athos (1315-1411), while another (MS BHG 1237) was composed by Theophanes of Vatopedi, a superior or hegoumen of Vatopedi Monastery.

Other biographies of Maximos the Hutburner were written during the early 14th century by Makarios Makres (c. 1382/3-1431) and Ioannikios Kochylas (written c. 1400).

== See also ==
- Niphon of Kafsokalyvia
- Kafsokalyvia
- Palamism
- Christian mysticism
