= Victorian of Asan =

Saint Victorian of Asan
- Born: Italy
- Died: c. 560; Spain
- Venerated in: Catholic Church, Eastern Orthodox Church
- Feast: January 12

Saint Victorian of Asan (Spanish: San Vitorián de Asan, in Aragonese San Beturián) (died ca. 560 AD) was a Spanish saint. A native of Italy, he founded monasteries and hospices there before settling briefly in France.

He became the founder and abbot of the monastery of Asan (now called San Vitorián). Asan was situated in the Aragonese Pyrenees, in the diocese of Barbastro.

He died of natural causes.

He is mentioned by Venantius Fortunatus.
