= Arcadius of Mauretania =

Roman saint and martyr

Saint Arcadius of Mauretania
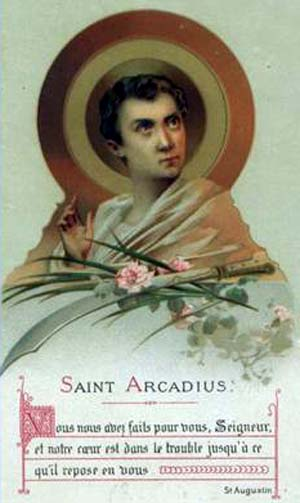
- Died: c. 302
- Venerated in: Roman Catholic Church; Eastern Orthodox Church
- Feast: January 12
- Attributes: Portrayed in art as an early Christian martyr with a club in his hand; sometimes he is shown with a lighted taper or on a rack or with his limbs chopped off.

Arcadius of Mauretania (died c. 302) is venerated as a saint and martyr. Tradition states that he was a prominent citizen of Caesarea in Mauretania Caesariensis (present-day Cherchell), who hid away in the countryside to avoid being forced to worship the Roman gods. His absence at the public sacrifices being noted, soldiers were dispatched to his house and arrested a relative they found there, despite the man's protests that he did not know where Arcadius was. Hearing of his relative's arrest, Arcadius returned and presented himself before the governor.

His legend states that he suffered a grisly death. His limbs were cut off, joint by joint, until all that remained were his trunk and head. According to his legend, as Arcadius looked around at all the pieces of himself that had been hacked off and were lying on the ground, still being able to speak, he cried out, "You are happy, my members. Now you really belong to God. You have all been sacrificed to Him."

The cultus of Arcadius is established by a sermon preached about him by Zeno of Verona, who also hailed from Mauretania.
