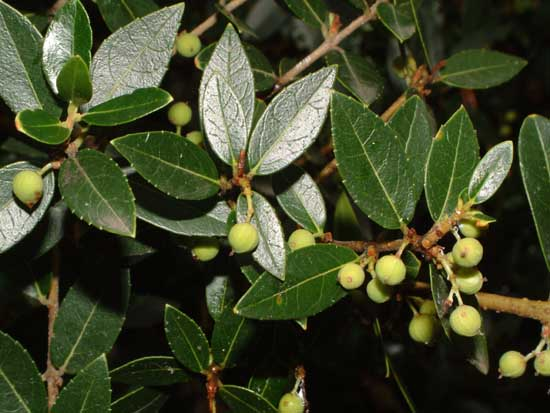
- Phillyrea latifolia

Conservation status
- Least Concern (IUCN 3.1)

Scientific classification
- Kingdom: Plantae
- Clade: Tracheophytes
- Clade: Angiosperms
- Clade: Eudicots
- Clade: Asterids
- Order: Lamiales
- Family: Oleaceae
- Genus: Phillyrea
- Species: P. latifolia

Binomial name
- Phillyrea latifolia L.

Synonyms
- List: Olea latifolia (L.) Salisb.; Phillyrea aeolica Tineo ex Lojac.; Phillyrea angustifolia subsp. latifolia (L.) Maire; Phillyrea angustifolia subsp. rodriguezii (P.Monts.) Rivas Mart.; Phillyrea arbutifolia Sennen; Phillyrea barceloi Sennen; Phillyrea barceloi subsp. flahaultiana Sennen; Phillyrea barceloi subsp. knochei Sennen; Phillyrea barceloi subsp. marcetii Sennen; Phillyrea barceloi subsp. moraudii Sennen; Phillyrea barrandonis Sennen; Phillyrea bolivaris Sennen; Phillyrea bolivaris subsp. foliosa Sennen; Phillyrea buxifolia (Aiton) Link; Phillyrea cadevallii Sennen; Phillyrea caroli Sennen; Phillyrea colmeiroana Sennen; Phillyrea cordifolia Sennen; Phillyrea cordifolia subsp. barrerae Sennen; Phillyrea cordifolia subsp. burnatii Sennen; Phillyrea cordifolia subsp. fernandezii Sennen; Phillyrea cordifolia subsp. gaudiana Sennen; Phillyrea cordifolia subsp. gonzaleziana Sennen; Phillyrea cordifolia subsp. navasii Sennen; Phillyrea cordifolia subsp. oblongifolia Sennen; Phillyrea cordifolia subsp. parlatorei Sennen; Phillyrea cordifolia subsp. puigii Sennen; Phillyrea cordifolia subsp. rabassaletana Sennen; Phillyrea cordifolia subsp. sallentii Sennen; Phillyrea cordifolia subsp. sanmiguelis Sennen; Phillyrea cordifolia subsp. vinyalsii Sennen; Phillyrea cordifolia subsp. webbiana Sennen; Phillyrea coriacea Link; Phillyrea daveauana Sennen; Phillyrea divaricata Vis.; Phillyrea ellipticifolia Sennen; Phillyrea ellipticifolia subsp. bordoyana Sennen; Phillyrea foliosa Sennen; Phillyrea fontserei Sennen; Phillyrea grandifolia Sennen; Phillyrea hybrida Sennen; Phillyrea ilicifolia Willd.; Phillyrea integrifolia Sennen; Phillyrea isabelis Sennen; Phillyrea jahandiezii Sennen; Phillyrea jordani-media Sennen; Phillyrea laevis Münchh.; Phillyrea laevis subsp. gastonis Sennen; Phillyrea latifolia subsp. daninii Valdés; Phillyrea latifolia subsp. media (L.) P.Fourn.; Phillyrea latifolia var. obliqua Aiton; Phillyrea latifolia subsp. rodriguezii (P.Monts.) Romo; Phillyrea latifolia var. rodriguezii (P.Monts.) O.Bolòs & Vigo; Phillyrea latifolia var. spinosa (Mill.) Aiton; Phillyrea latifolia subsp. stricta (Bertol.) Rouy; Phillyrea levis Ten.; Phillyrea ligustrifolia L.; Phillyrea longifolia Sennen; Phillyrea longifolia Link; Phillyrea longifolia subsp. andreuana Sennen; Phillyrea longifolia subsp. briquetii Sennen; Phillyrea longifolia subsp. closiana Sennen; Phillyrea longifolia subsp. degenii Sennen; Phillyrea longifolia subsp. forestieri Sennen; Phillyrea longifolia subsp. grandifolia Sennen; Phillyrea longifolia subsp. laguardae Sennen; Phillyrea longifolia subsp. laurifolia Sennen; Phillyrea longifolia subsp. loretii Sennen; Phillyrea longifolia subsp. maireana Sennen; Phillyrea longifolia subsp. pardilloana Sennen; Phillyrea longifolia subsp. pujiulae Sennen; Phillyrea longifolia subsp. reynieri Sennen; Phillyrea longifolia subsp. salvadoris Sennen; Phillyrea longifolia subsp. tournefortii Sennen; Phillyrea longifolia subsp. unamunoana Sennen; Phillyrea longifolia subsp. vidalii Sennen; Phillyrea major Zumagl.; Phillyrea martini Sennen; Phillyrea media L.; Phillyrea media var. ligustrifolia (L.) Aiton; Phillyrea media var. oleifolia (Mill.) Aiton; Phillyrea media var. pendula Aiton; Phillyrea media var. virgata Aiton; Phillyrea medianifolia Sennen; Phillyrea medianifolia subsp. aguilaris Sennen; Phillyrea medianifolia subsp. allorgeana Sennen; Phillyrea medianifolia subsp. bercialis Sennen; Phillyrea medianifolia subsp. caballeroi Sennen; Phillyrea medianifolia subsp. castellana Sennen & Elías; Phillyrea medianifolia subsp. crenatifolia Sennen; Phillyrea medianifolia subsp. danielis Sennen; Phillyrea medianifolia subsp. dionysiana Sennen; Phillyrea medianifolia subsp. fernandii Sennen; Phillyrea medianifolia subsp. flichei Sennen; Phillyrea medianifolia subsp. frondosa Sennen; Phillyrea medianifolia subsp. heracliana Sennen; Phillyrea medianifolia subsp. heribaudii Sennen; Phillyrea medianifolia subsp. ilicifolia Sennen; Phillyrea medianifolia subsp. jordanii Sennen; Phillyrea medianifolia subsp. jorroi Sennen & Mauricio; Phillyrea medianifolia subsp. luciae Sennen; Phillyrea medianifolia subsp. maurorum Sennen; Phillyrea medianifolia subsp. montserratensis Sennen; Phillyrea medianifolia subsp. neriifolia Sennen; Phillyrea medianifolia subsp. paui Sennen; Phillyrea medianifolia subsp. prunellifolia Sennen; Phillyrea medianifolia subsp. souliei Sennen; Phillyrea medianifolia subsp. timbalii Sennen; Phillyrea medianifolia subsp. tortesii Sennen; Phillyrea medianifolia subsp. vayedana Sennen; Phillyrea medianifolia subsp. verdagueri Sennen; Phillyrea mucronata Tausch; Phillyrea nerifolia-media Sennen; Phillyrea obliqua (Aiton) Willd.; Phillyrea oblongifolia Sennen; Phillyrea obtusata Link; Phillyrea oleifolia Mill.; Phillyrea olleri Sennen; Phillyrea pachyphylla Sennen; Phillyrea pachyphylla subsp. augustinii Sennen; Phillyrea pedunculata Bory & Chaub.; Phillyrea pendula (Aiton) Willd.; Phillyrea prunellifolia-media Sennen; Phillyrea quercifolia Sennen; Phillyrea quercifolia subsp. floribunda Sennen; Phillyrea quercifolia subsp. hickelis Sennen; Phillyrea quercifolia subsp. xavieri Sennen; Phillyrea racemosa Link; Phillyrea rubioana Sennen; Phillyrea spinosa Mill.; Phillyrea stricta Bertol.; Phillyrea subangustifolia Sennen; Phillyrea subangustifolia subsp. alaternifolia Sennen; Phillyrea subangustifolia subsp. cneorifolia Sennen; Phillyrea subangustifolia subsp. fontqueri Sennen & Mauricio; Phillyrea subangustifolia subsp. martonnei Sennen; Phillyrea subangustifolia subsp. mezerifolia Sennen; Phillyrea subangustifolia subsp. microdonta Sennen; Phillyrea subangustifolia subsp. patxoti Sennen; Phillyrea subangustifolia subsp. rigoi Sennen; Phillyrea subangustifolia subsp. sagarrae Sennen; Phillyrea subangustifolia subsp. stricta (Bertol.) Sennen; Phillyrea subangustifolia subsp. sudrei Sennen; Phillyrea subangustifolia subsp. valdesulcata Sennen; Phillyrea subangustifolia subsp. vallisvidrerae Sennen; Phillyrea subangustifolia subsp. virgata (Aiton) Sennen; Phillyrea trabutii Sennen; Phillyrea valentina Sennen; Phillyrea variabilis Timb.-Lagr. & Loret; Phillyrea variabilis subsp. stricta (Bertol.) Arcang.; Phillyrea virgata (Aiton) Willd.; Phillyrea vulgaris Caruel

= Phillyrea latifolia =

Species of tree

Phillyrea latifolia, commonly known as green olive tree or mock privet, is a species of tree in the family Oleaceae. It is native to the Mediterranean Basin, from Morocco and Portugal in the west, to the Levant in the east.
