= Tygrius and Eutropius =

Roman martyrs (died 405)

Saint Tygrius and Eutropius
- Residence: Constantinople
- Died: 405 (Eutropius); Constantinople (modern-day Istanbul, Turkey)
- Feast: 12 January

Saints Tygrius and Eutropius (died 405) were two early Roman martyrs who supported Saint John Chrysostom at the time of his exile. Eutropius was tortured and died, while Tygrius was exiled, but both are considered martyrs. Their feast day is 12 January.

== Lives ==
Tygrius and Eutropius were supporters of the exiled Saint John Chrysostom, and were arrested on false charges of trying to burn down the cathedral in Constantinople. Eutropius was tortured and died of his injuries in 405, while Tygrius was exiled to Asia Minor. Tygrius, priest, and Eutropius, lector, who suffered in the time of the emperor Arcadius (r. 383–408), are honoured on 12 January.

== Butler's account ==
The hagiographer Alban Butler wrote,

Jan. 12.] SS. TYGRIUS AND EUTROPIUS, MM. TYGRIUS, a priest, who was scourged, tormented with the disjointing of his bones, stripped of all his goods, and sent into banishment; and EUTROPIUS, lector, and precentor of the church of Constantinople, who died in prison of his torments, having been scourged, his cheeks torn with iron hooks, and his sides burnt with torches; are honoured in the Roman Martyrology with the title of martyrs, on the 12th of January.

== Doney's account ==
Mgr. Doney, in the Grande vie des saints (1872) wrote,

Saint Tygrius et Saint Eutrope, Martyrs

The chance of birth seemed to have never separated these two holy characters, united by the defense of the same interests, and the glory of a common martyrdom. Tygrius was born among the barbarians who conquered the Roman Empire. Having been taken prisoner in his youth, he was sold as a slave to a rich and powerful man from Constantinople who gave him freedom, as a reward for his zeal in serving him. His piety and virtues then brought him into the ecclesiastical state, and elevated him to the priesthood. Tygrius was so gentle and so fervent in piety, that in a short time he attracted the esteem and affection of the clergy and people of Constantinople.

St. John Chrysostom also knew how to appreciate his rare virtue, gave him his confidence, and lived with him in a very close friendship. This honorable friendship exposed Tygrius to the persecutions of the enemies of the holy Patriarch, and when Theophilus of Alexandria convened, in a suburb of Chalcedon, the famous Synod of the Oak, which condemned in such an unjust and odious manner this eloquent doctor of the Church, he himself was summoned to appear before these passionate and prevaricating judges, and condemned as one of the most devoted supporters of John Chrysostom.

Eutrope, a lector (reader) of the church of Constantinople, belonged to one of the patrician families of that city. He was a young man of very delicate complexion, who had received a distinguished education, and who had already been distinguished by the sanctity of his life when the opportunity presented itself for him to deploy a firmness. and an invincible courage to the most cruel supplications.

At the time when St. Chrysostom was expelled for the second time from Constantinople, a fire broke out, it is not known by what accident, in the patriarchal church of Hagia Sophia, and the hall where the senate met. The governor of the city, Optat, who was still a pagan, was charmed to find, in this fortuitous event, a pretext for raging against these men who by their virtues and lights attracted new proselytes to the religion of Jesus Christ every day, and aroused in them, on this occasion, violent persecutions which the weakness of the children of the great and pious Theodosius were incapable of repressing.

The lector Eutrope and the priest Tygrius, both guilty of too ardent a zeal for religion and too much devotion to the banished patriarch, were the first to be arrested. Eutrope was first tortured to force him to reveal the perpetrators of the fire. But this cruelty only served to explode, in the person of this frail young man, the power of the One who knows how to make the weakest instruments confound the strongest.

Optat first had him beaten with rods, then his face and all his limbs were torn with hard nails; finally his whole body became nothing but a wound, over which they ran fiery torches to make the pain more alive and more sensitive. Eutrope suffered these atrocious treatments with admirable firmness; nothing could dampen his courage, and he continued to cry out loudly, in the midst of the torments, in favor of justice and truth unworthily violated in the cause of the holy Bishop. His enemies, confused by a heroism they were far from expecting, had him transported to a prison, where he died from his wounds. Pallade claims, however, that he died on the very scene of his torture, in the eyes of all the people trembling with indignation. However that may be, shortly after the tragic death of Eutrope, the Lord testified by several miracles to the holiness of this glorious Martyr.

Optat then summoned the priest Tygrius; he was first stripped of his clothes and cruelly beaten with rods. This torture not being able to wrest from him the name of the authors of the fire which he did not know. The governor made him lie down on a rack, and his hands and feet were pulled so violently that his body was dislocated. However, he survived this dreadful torment; but having been later condemned to banishment for not having wanted to communicate with Arsace, intruding patriarch of Constantinople, he was transported to Mesopotamia. We do not know the last details of his life, or the nature and precise time of his death; but the Church does not stop honoring him as a martyr. She celebrates his feast on January 12, with that of Saint Eutrope.

== Sources ==
- Butler, Alban (1812), The Lives of the Fathers, Martyrs, and Other Principal Saints: Compiled from Original Monuments and Other Authentic Records, Illustrated with the Remarks of Judicious Modern Critics and Historians, J. Murphy
- Doney (1872), "Saint Tygrius et Saint Eutropius, Martyrs", in Collin de Plancy, Jacques-Albin-Simon; Daras, Edouard (eds.), Grande vie des saints: comprenant la vie et les fêtes de Notre-Seigneur et de la très-sainte Vierge, des saints de l'Ancien et du Nouveau Testament, des bienheureux et des vénérables serviteurs de Dieu, les plus récents et des plus illustres confesseurs de la foi (in French), Vivès
- Gibbons, James (1916), The Roman martyrology, Baltimore: John Murphy
- "Saint of the Day for January 12", Catholic Readings
