= October 13 (Eastern Orthodox liturgics) =

Day in the Eastern Orthodox liturgical calendar

Eastern Orthodox liturgical calendar
October 12	October 13	October 14
October 13 O.S. ≍ October 26 N.S. October 13 N.S ≍ September 30 O.S.

An Eastern Orthodox cross

October 13 in Eastern Orthodox liturgical calendars is a feast day and a day of commemoration of saints and martyrs. Although some Orthodox churches use the Revised Julian Calendar and others use the traditional Julian calendar, the fixed commemorations for their respective October 13 are broadly the same, no matter which calendar is used. (Note: Despite the dates being the same, the days to which they refer typically differ by 13 days. The notation Old Style or O.S. is sometimes used to indicate a date in the traditional Julian Calendar (the "Old Calendar"). The notation New Style or N.S. indicates a date in the Revised Julian calendar (the "New Calendar").)

== Saints ==
- Martyr Florentius of Thessalonica (1st-2nd centuries) (Note: "At Thessalonica, St. Florentius, a martyr, who, after enduring various torments, was burned alive.") (Note: "Florentius of Thessalonica, a very zealous Christian, was hung on the " little horse," and his sides torn with iron rakes; then, more dead than alive, he was cast into a burning pile of wood and consumed.") (see also: March 14)
- Saint Martyrius. (Note: He is not present in the Synaxarion. His memory is referenced in the Patmiako Codex 266, together with St. Florentius of Thessalonica. However he may be the same as St, Martyrius the Notary of Constantinople (October 25).)
- Saint Diocletian. (Note: He is not present in the Synaxarion. His memory is referenced in the Lavreotiko Codex Δ23, together with St. Florentius of Thessalonica, where their service can be found.)
- Hieromartyrs Carpus, Bishop at Thyateira, and Papylus the Deacon, and Martyrs Agathadorus and Agathonica, at Pergamus (251) (Note: "At Troas, in Asia Minor, the birthday of St. Carpus, disciple of the blessed apostle Paul.")
- Saint Dioscorus the Martyr, by decapitation (288) (Note: He originated from the so-called Skinopolites, and he held office as a councillor. He abandoned all worldly goods and honours, and presented himself to the governor, Lucian, whom he roundly held to account for the persecutions against the Christians. The archon being stunned at Dioscorus' attitude, attempted to convert his opinion through flattery and threats. However because he did not succeed, he tortured the Saint fiercely and in the end decapitated him.)
- Martyr Antigonus, by fire.
- Holy Two Children-Martyrs, by fire.
- Hieromartyr Saint Benjamin the Deacon and Martyr, of Persia (421–424) (Note: Certain Synaxaria commemorate him on March 31 as well.)
- Saint Nicetas the Confessor and Patrician, of Paphlagonia (c. 838)
- Saint Luke of Demena, Sicily (984) (Note: See: (in Italian) Luca di Demenna. Wikipedia. (Italian Wikipedia).)

== Pre-Schism Western saints ==
- Saints Faustus, Januarius and Martial, martyrs in Cordoba in Spain under Diocletian, called "The Three Crowns of Cordoba" (304) (Note: "At Cordova, in Spain, the birthday of the holy martyrs Faustus, Januarius, and Martial. First tortured on the rack, then having their eyelashes shaven, their teeth plucked out, their ears and noses cut off, they finished their martyrdom by fire.") (Note: "Faustus, Januarius, and Martial, three Christians of Cordova, were brought before the governor Eulogius, and when they refused to sacrifice were slung on the " little horse," but without the pain shaking their confidence and faith. Eulogius then ordered the ears and noses of Faustus and Januarius to be cut off, and as they remained steadfast, the three martyrs were consumed by fire. The "invention" of their relics took place in the year 1575. The church of S. Peter in Cordova was being repaired, when a stone sarcophagus was dug up containing bones and skulls of eighteen bodies. Popular opinion at once concluded that these were the bodies of the three martyrs, with some extra sufferers. This pious conjecture was affirmed to be true by a papal bull of Gregory XIII.")
- Saints Fyncana and Fyndoca, two martyrs in Scotland. (Note: "The Aberdeen Breviary says that Fyncana and Findoch died respectively in 526 and 716. But Hector Boece says that they were daughters of S. Donevald, or Donald (July 12), who, with his nine daughters, is said by local tradition to have led a religious life in the glen of Ogilvy, in Forfarshire, where they are still remembered as the Nine Maidens. After his death they are said to have gone to Abernethy. Boece, however, makes only seven maidens. The church of Finaven was dedicated to the Nine Maidens, so also was Strathmartin. There is a Nine Maiden Well there, and in the park at Glamis. But there were other nine maidens brought over by S. Bridget — chief of whom was S. Mazota (Dec. 23) — who are often confounded with the daughters of S. Donald. In the Breviary of Aberdeen is a note or rubric that Fyncana was venerated at Echt in the diocese of Aberdeen, and Findocha at the archidiaconate of the diocese of Dunblane, this is probably Findo-Gask. At Bendochy, near Cupar Angus, there was anciently a chapel at S. Phink, dedicated to that saint; a small part of the ruins remain.")
- Saint Venantius, Abbot of the monastery of St. Martin in Tours, Confessor (end of 5th century)
- Saint Romulus of Genoa, Bishop of Genoa in Italy (c. 641) (Note: He reposed at the coastal town of Matuziano, since renamed San Remo after him.)
- Saint Berthoald, Fifth Bishop of Cambrai-Arras in France (7th century)
- Saint Comgan, Abbot of Lochalsh (8th century) (Note: Born in Ireland, he was the brother of St Kentigern. He became a monk in Scotland and was buried on Iona.)
- Saint Simpert (Simbert, Sinthert), Bishop of Augsburg in Germany (c. 809) (Note: A monk and Abbot of Murbach near Colmar in Alsace in France. In 778 he became Bishop of Augsburg in Germany.) (Note: "S. Simpert, or Sindebert, was a nephew of Charles the Great, according to some modern authors, but no good grounds for such a statement can be produced. He spent his early life in the abbey of Murbach, near Colmar, and on the death of Tasso, Bishop of Augsburg, in 778, Charlemagne selected him to be his successor. After the death of Abbot Amicho of Murbach he was elected abbot in his room, so that he ruled at the same time an extensive diocese and an important monastery. He rebuilt the church of S. Afra at Augsburg, and greatly benefited by endowments the abbey of Fussen.")
- Saint Gerald of Aurillac, Count of Aurillac in France, founder of a church and abbey on his estate of Aurillac (909) (Note: Gerald, Count of Aurillac in France, led virtuous life as a layman. He founded a monastery on his estate and endowed it. He is the patron-saint of Upper Auvergne.)
- Saint Coloman of Stockerau, an Irish pilgrim en route to the Holy Land, tortured and hanged at Stockerau, near Vienna, Austria (1012) (Note: Born in Ireland, he was going through Austria on his way to the Holy Land, when he was arrested as a spy, tortured and hanged with evildoers in Stockerau near Vienna. Miracles were worked by his relics and he was venerated as a saint. He is honoured as one of the patron-saints of Austria.)
- Saint Regimbald (Reginbald, Regimbaut), Bishop of Speyer (1039) (Note: A monk at the monastery of Sts Ulric and Afra in Augsburg in Germany. In 1015 he moved to the monastery of Edersberg. In 1022 he became Abbot of Lorsch and later founded the monastery of Heiligenberg and in 1032 he became Bishop of Speyer.)

== Post-Schism Orthodox saints ==
- Monk-martyr Jacob of Hamatoura Monastery, Lebanon (late 13th century)
- Venerable Benjamin of the Kiev Caves (14th century) (Note: See: (in Russian) Вениамин Печерский. Википе́дия. (Russian Wikipedia).)
- Saint Meletius I Pegas, Archbishop of Alexandria (1601) (see also: September 13)
- New martyr Chryse (Zlata) of Meglen (1795)
- Saint Anthony, Metropolitan of Chkondidi (Martvili Monastery), Georgia (1815), and his disciple James the Elder, Hieromonk.

=== New Martys and Confessors ===
- New Martyr Bosiljka Rajičić (18th century) (Note: "Bosiljka Rajičić (18th C.) was 17 when Albanians kidnapped her. She flatly refused to marry an Albanian and to convert to Islam, and endured all manners of torments. Then she was taken out of the village and torn to pieces, and her relatives were forbidden to bury her remains. Amongst the people, the place of her death became known as "The Girl’s Grave," and a fresco of her soon appeared in Peć Monastery. Her memory will be celebrated on October 13/26.") (Note: See: (in Serbian) Света новомученица Босиљка Пасјанска. Википедију. (Serbian Wikipedia).)
- New Hieromartyr Innocent Kikin. Priest (1937) (Note: See: (in Russian) Кикин, Иннокентий Арсеньевич. Википе́дия. (Russian Wikipedia).)
- New Hieromartyr Nicholas Yermolov, Priest (1937) (Note: See: (in Russian) Ермолов, Николай Алексеевич (священнослужитель). Википе́дия. (Russian Wikipedia).)

== Other commemorations ==
- Translation to Moscow of the Iveron Icon of the Most Holy Theotokos (1648)
- Kazan Icon of the Most Holy Theotokos "Of the Seven Lakes" (17th century) (Note: See: (in Russian) Седмиозерная икона Божией Матери. Википе́дия. (Russian Wikipedia).)
- Repose of Monk Athanasius of Valaam Monastery (1852)
- Translation of the relics (1965) of Venerable Sabbas the Sanctified (532), from the church of Sant'Antonin, Venice, to the Holy Lavra of Saint Sabbas the Sanctified, Jerusalem. (Note: Saint Sabbas' relics had been stolen by the Crusaders of the First Crusade (1096-1099), along with many other relics, and were brought to Venice and placed in the Church of Sant'Antonin. The delegation from the Patriarchate of Jerusalem in 1965 included Archbishop Vasilios of Jordan (later the Matropolitan of Caesarea); Archimandrite Theodosios - Igumen of Bethany; Archimandrite Serapheim Savvaitis - Igumen of the Holy Lavra of Saint Sabbas the Sanctified; and Hierodeacon Kyriakos (later the Metropolitan of Nazareth). Elder Serapheim Savvaitis (†2003) had written in his memoirs that: "the Pope did not return the holy relics to us because he loved us, but because Saint Sabbas the Sanctified would often appear to him and troubled him to return his relics back to his monastery (i.e. Holy Lavra of Saint Sabbas the Sanctified). When the Pope died without having taken into account the Saint, Saint Sabbas appeared again to his successor. Moreover, in the church where his holy relics were kept within a glass reliquary, the Saint would hit the glass, making trouble and upsetting the guards and the Latin monks.")
- Uncovering of the Relics (1993) of New Hieromartyr Thaddeus (Uspensky), Archbishop of Tver (1937) (Note: See: (in Russian) Фаддей (Успенский). Википе́дия. (Russian Wikipedia).)

== Icon gallery ==
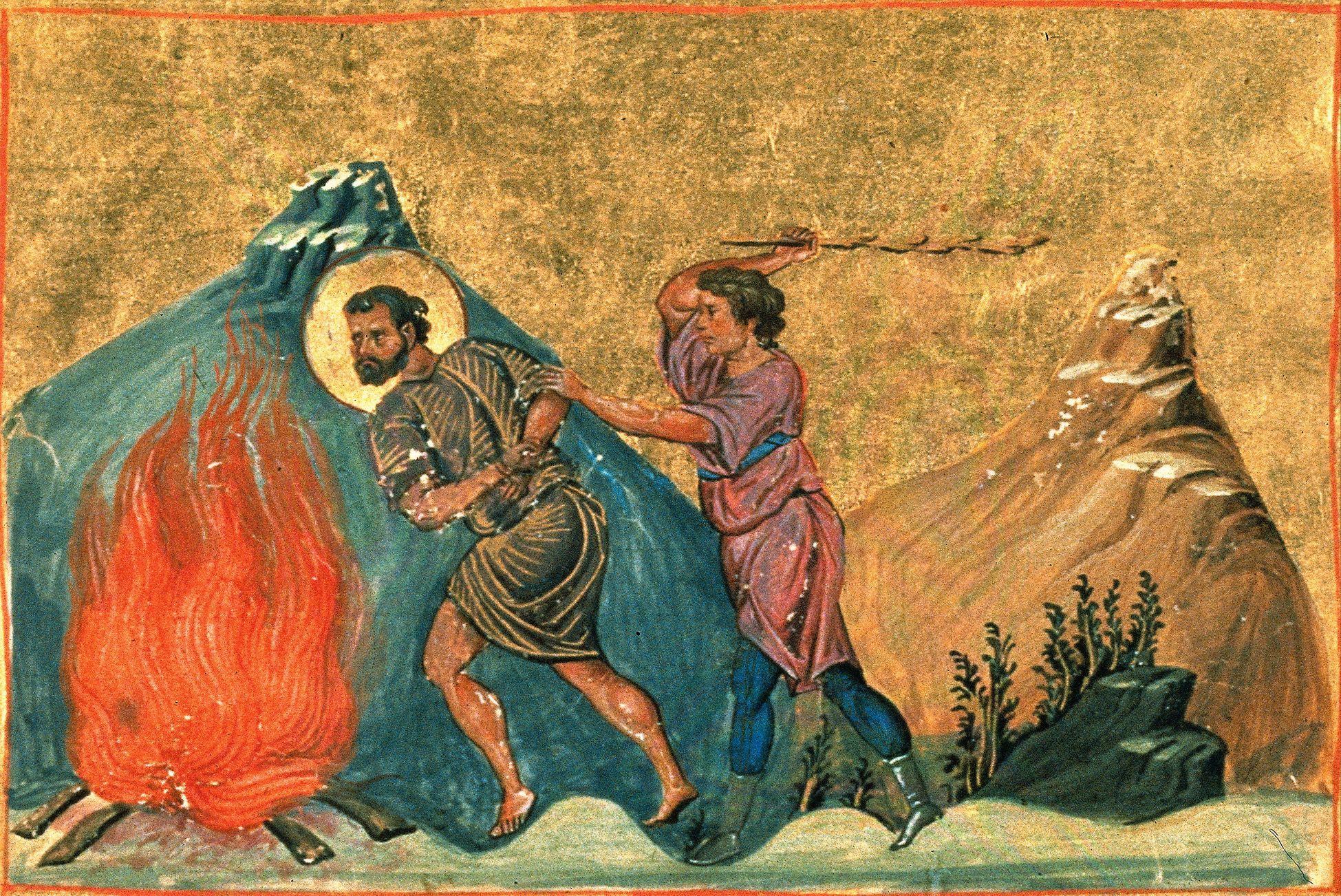
Martyr Florentius of Thessaloniki.
(Menologion of Basil II, 10th century).

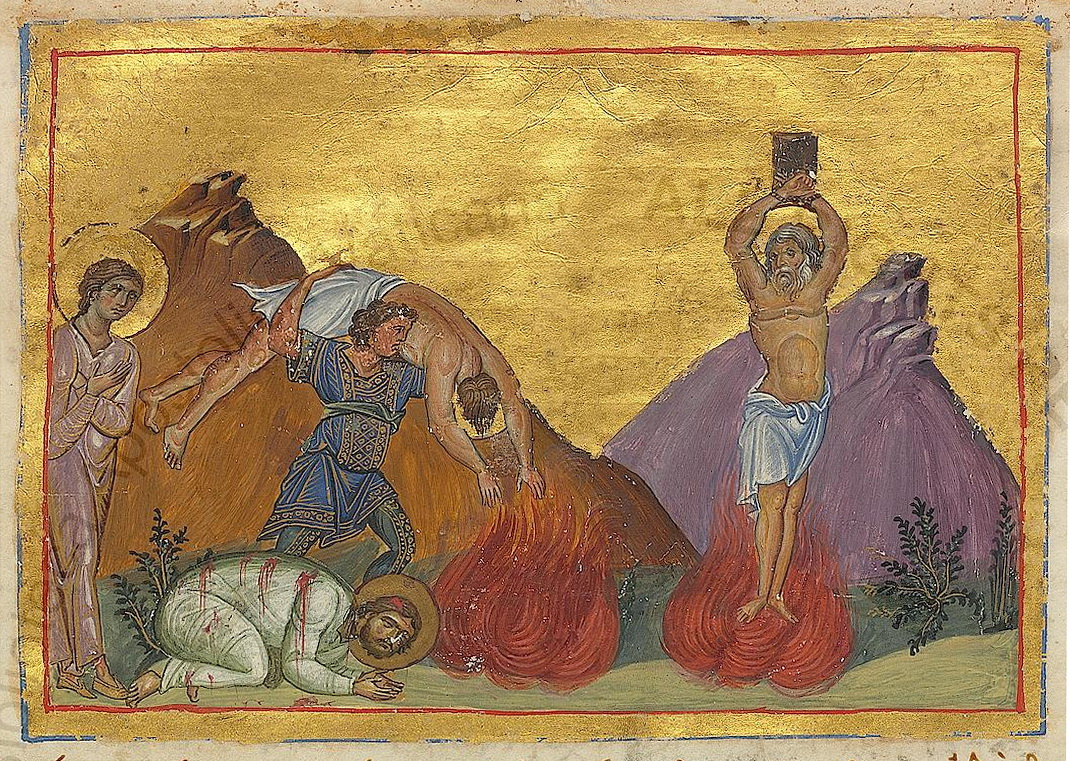
Hieromartyrs Carpus, Papylus, Agathadorus and Agathonica, at Pergamus.
(Menologion of Basil II, 10th century).

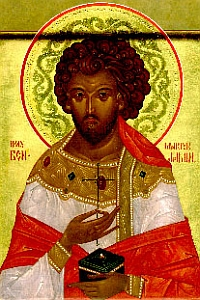
Hieromartyr Saint Benjamin the Deacon and Martyr, of Persia.

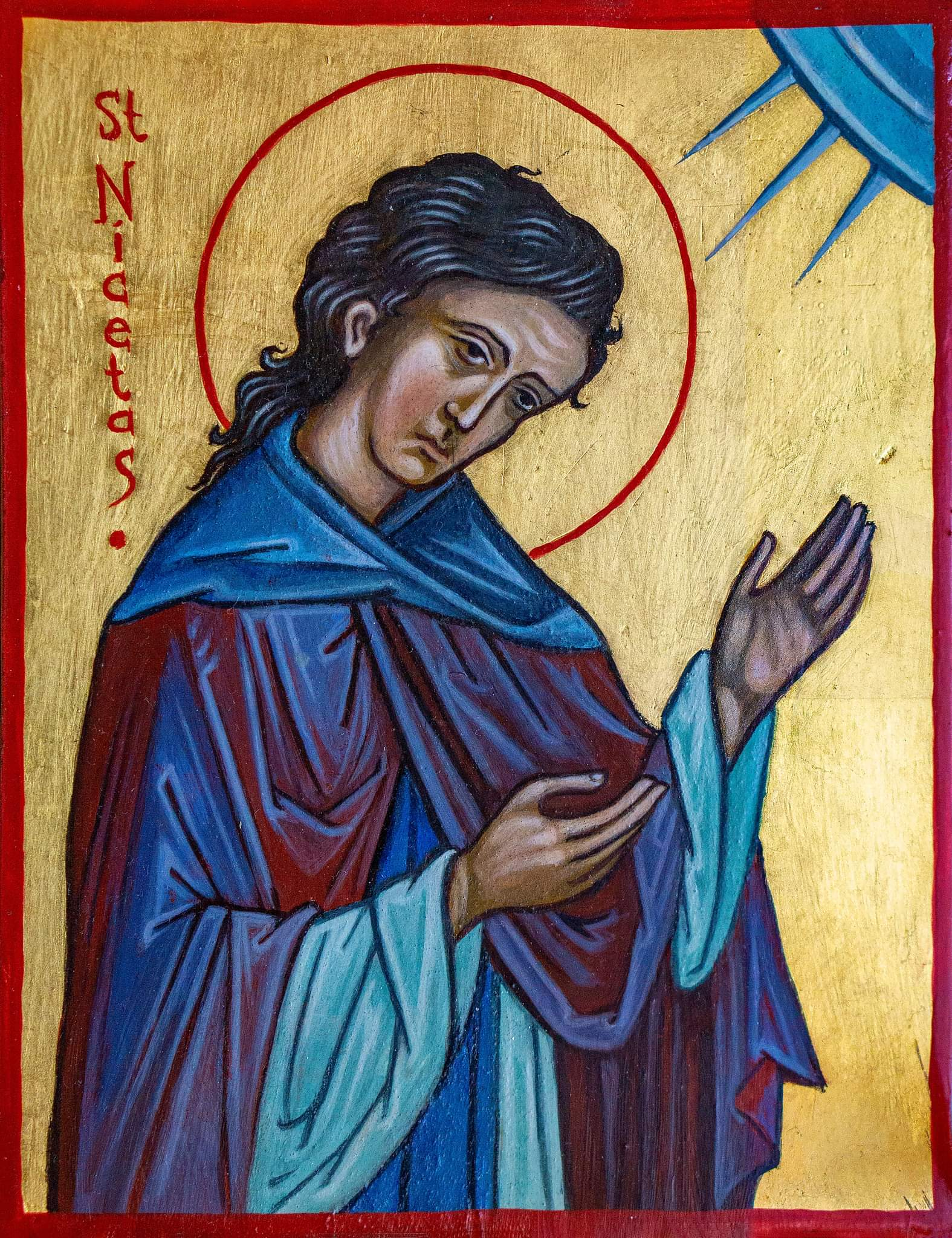
St. Nicetas the Confessor and Patrician.

Reliquary of St. Luke of Demena, Sicily.

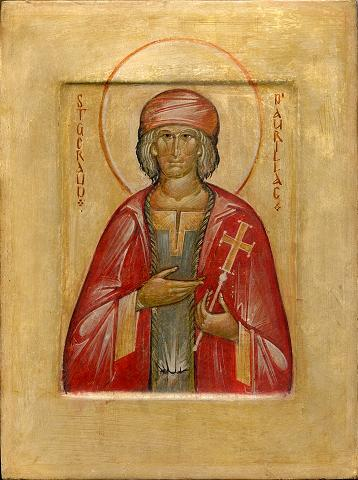
St. Gerald of Aurillac.

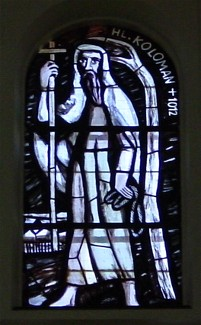
St. Coloman of Stockerau.

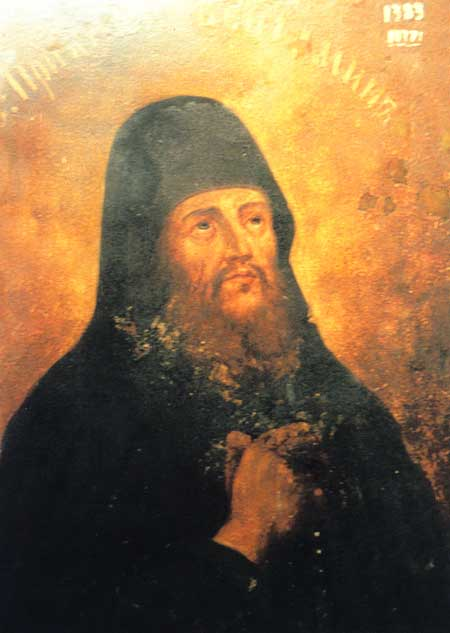
Venerable Benjamin of the Kiev Caves.

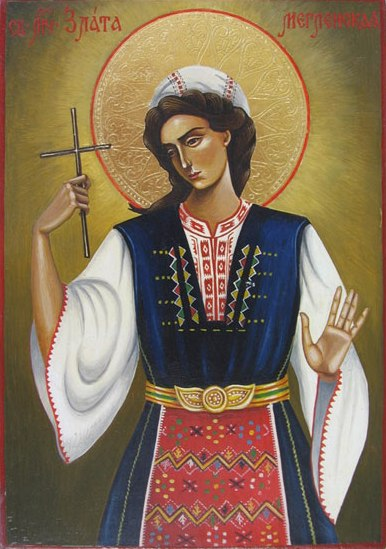
New martyr Chryse (Zlata) of Meglin.

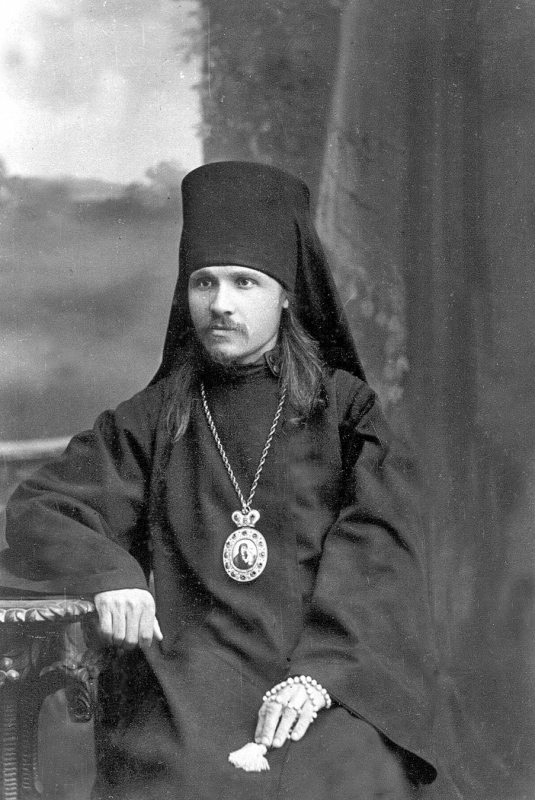
New Hieromartyr Thaddeus (Uspensky), Archbishop of Tver.

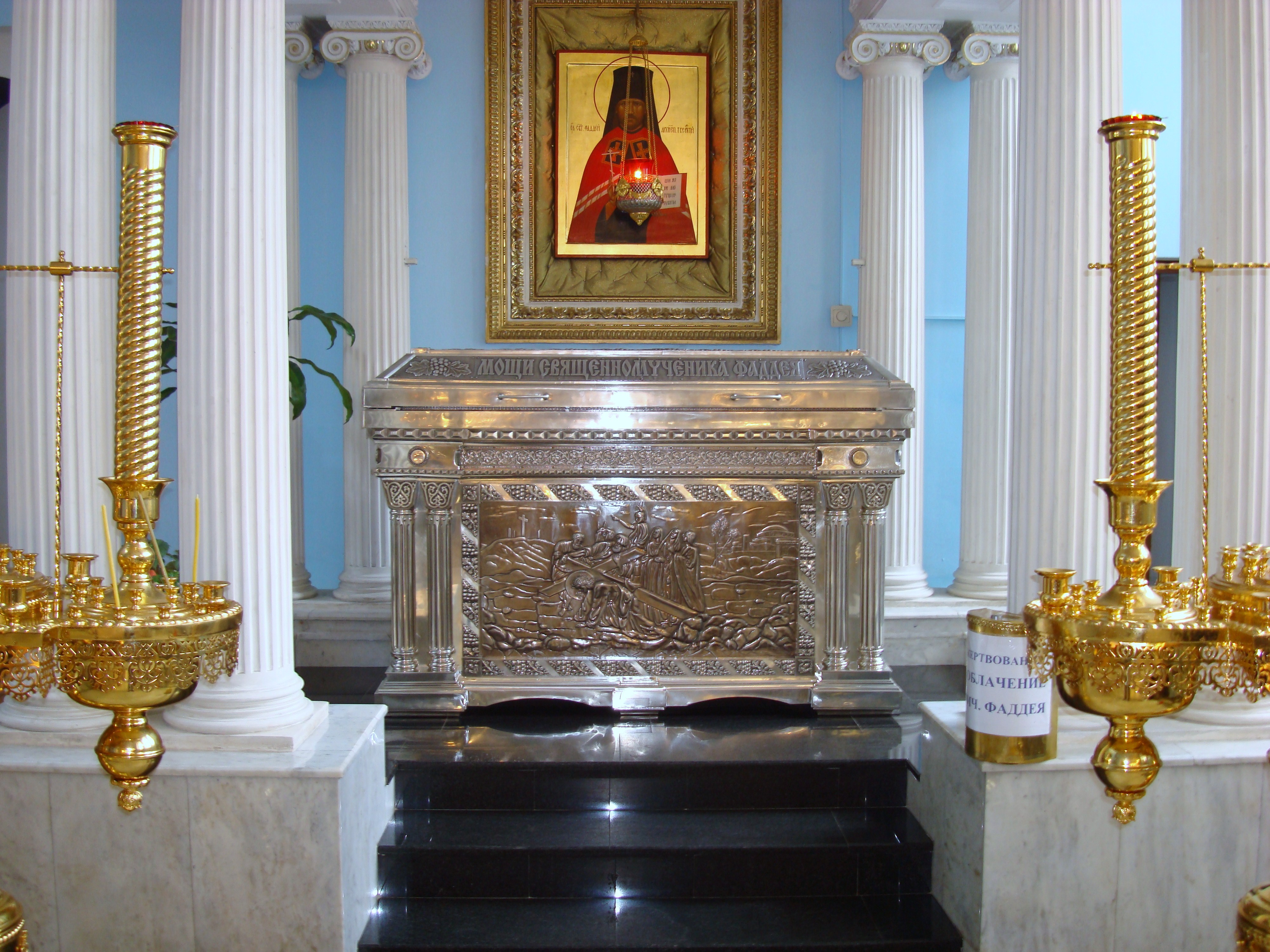
Reliquary of New Hieromartyr Thaddeus (Uspensky), Archbishop of Tver.

== Sources ==
- October 13/26. Orthodox Calendar (PRAVOSLAVIE.RU).
- October 26 / October 13. HOLY TRINITY RUSSIAN ORTHODOX CHURCH (A parish of the Patriarchate of Moscow).
- October 13. OCA - The Lives of the Saints.
- The Autonomous Orthodox Metropolia of Western Europe and the Americas (ROCOR). St. Hilarion Calendar of Saints for the year of our Lord 2004. St. Hilarion Press (Austin, TX). p. 76.
- The Thirteenth Day of the Month of October. Orthodoxy in China.
- October 13. Latin Saints of the Orthodox Patriarchate of Rome.
- The Roman Martyrology. Transl. by the Archbishop of Baltimore. Last Edition, According to the Copy Printed at Rome in 1914. Revised Edition, with the Imprimatur of His Eminence Cardinal Gibbons. Baltimore: John Murphy Company, 1916. pp. 316–317.
- Rev. Richard Stanton. A Menology of England and Wales, or, Brief Memorials of the Ancient British and English Saints Arranged According to the Calendar, Together with the Martyrs of the 16th and 17th Centuries. London: Burns & Oates, 1892. p. 492.

Greek Sources

- Great Synaxaristes: (in Greek) 13 ΟΚΤΩΒΡΙΟΥ. ΜΕΓΑΣ ΣΥΝΑΞΑΡΙΣΤΗΣ.
- (in Greek) Συναξαριστής. 13 Οκτωβρίου. ECCLESIA.GR. (H ΕΚΚΛΗΣΙΑ ΤΗΣ ΕΛΛΑΔΟΣ).
- (in Greek) 13/10/2017. Ορθόδοξος Συναξαριστής.

Russian Sources

- (in Russian) 26 октября (13 октября). Православная Энциклопедия под редакцией Патриарха Московского и всея Руси Кирилла (электронная версия). (Orthodox Encyclopedia - Pravenc.ru).
- (in Russian) 13 октября по старому стилю / 26 октября по новому стилю. Русская Православная Церковь - Православный церковный календарь на 2016 год.
