= October 12 (Eastern Orthodox liturgics) =

Day in the Eastern Orthodox liturgical calendar

Eastern Orthodox liturgical calendar
October 11	October 12	October 13
October 12 O.S. ≍ October 25 N.S. October 12 N.S ≍ September 29 O.S.

An Eastern Orthodox cross

October 12 in Eastern Orthodox liturgical calendars is a feast day and a day of commemoration of saints and martyrs. Although some Orthodox churches use the Revised Julian Calendar and others use the traditional Julian calendar, the fixed commemorations for their respective October 12 are broadly the same, no matter which calendar is used. (Note: Despite the dates being the same, the days to which they refer typically differ by 13 days. The notation Old Style or O.S. is sometimes used to indicate a date in the traditional Julian Calendar (the "Old Calendar"). The notation New Style or N.S. indicates a date in the Revised Julian calendar (the "New Calendar").)

== Saints ==
- Virgin-martyr Anastasia of Rome (c. 250) (Note: "Hagiographical research suggests that there have been at least four saints named Anastasia, two of them martyrs in Rome in the 250s, one martyred in Sirmium of Pannonia (modern Serbia) in the late third or early fourth century, and one a patrician woman from the time of Justinian. The careers and multilayered conflations of the three (or perhaps two) martyrs named Anastasia have been studied in detail (by Hippolyte Delahaye, Paul Devos and François Halkin); the history is convoluted...; the three martyrs as commonly distinguished are: 1. October 12: Anastasia "the Roman", virgin martyr under Diocletian and Valerian.; 2. October 28/29 (also 12 October, 25 December): Anastasia "the Virgin", martyr under Diocletian.; 3. December 22: Anastasia pharmakolytria "Poison-Curer", widow and martyr in Sirmium/Sirmio, and her companions.") (see also: October 29)
- Martyr Domnina of Anazarbus in Cilicia (286) (Note: "DOMNINA suffered in .the persecution of Diocletian. She was a native of Anazarbus in Cilicia. The soles of her feet were burnt, and her back was scourged. She died of exhaustion in prison.") (Note: "In Lycia, St. Domnina, martyr, under the emperor Diocletian.")
- Martyr Malfetha, shot with arrows.
- Martyr Anthea, martyred within a brazen bull.
- Holy seventy (70) martyrs. (Note: Most likely the same martyrs as those commemorated on September 30.)
- Martyrs Juventinus and Maximinus (361) (Note: Saint John Chrysostom wrote their encomium (eulogy).) (see also: September 5, October 9)
- Martyrs Andromachos and Diodoros, by fire. (Note: Name days celebrated today include: Andromachos (Ἀνδρομάχος); Andromache (Ἀνδρομάχη).)
- Saint Martin the Merciful, Bishop of Tours (397) (Note: Born in Upper Pannonia (now Hungary), he was the son of a Roman officer. At the age of fifteen he enrolled in the imperial cavalry. In Amiens in France, where he was posted, he cut his cloak in half and gave his own half to a beggar. This beggar turned out to be Christ. This led to his baptism. He left the army and placed himself in the hands of St Hilary, Bishop of Poitiers, living for ten years as a hermit and founding a monastery in Ligugé. In 372 he was made Bishop of Tours, but he accepted the office with great reluctance. Founding another monastic centre in Marmoutier, he continued to live as a monk, while publicly he devoted himself to his episcopal duties. He opposed Arianism and Priscillianism, but befriended Priscillianists when they were persecuted by the civil authorities. He was the greatest monk in the West of the age and hundreds of churches were dedicated to him. His shrine in Tours was and still is a resort of Orthodox pilgrims.) (of unknown origin, Russian usage only -see also: November 11, November 12, July 4)
- Martyrs Probus, Tarachus, and Andronicus, at Tarsus in Cilicia (304)
- Saint Cosmas the Hymnographer, Bishop of Maiuma (c. 787) (see also: October 14)
- Saint Theodotus, Bishop of Ephesus, reposed in peace.
- Saint Jason, Bishop of Damascus, reposed in peace.
- Venerable Theosebius the God-bearer, of Arsinoe in Cyprus. (Note: His brother was St. Arcadius of Arsinoe, Bishop and Wonderworker, who is commemorated on August 29.)
- Venerable Symeon the New Theologian (1022) (Note: Transferred to this day from March 12, in Great Lent.)

== Pre-Schism Western saints ==
- Saint Monas, Bishop of Milan (249) (Note: Bishop of Milan in Italy from 193 for fifty-six years. He lived through several persecutions.) (Note: "At Milan, St. Monas, bishop. He was chosen as head of that church, because a miraculous light from heaven surrounded him whilst they were deliberating on the choice of a bishop.")
- Hieromartyr Maximilian, Bishop of Noricum (284) (Note: Born in Noricum, between the Inn and the Danube, in Austria. As bishop, he founded the church of Lorsch near Passau and was martyred in Cilli in Styria under Numerian.) (Note: "At Cilly, in Styria, St. Maximilian, bishop of Lorch.")
- Saint Edistius, a martyr in Ravenna in Italy under Diocletian (303) (Note: "At Ravenna, on the Lauretine road, the birthday of St. Edistius, martyr.")
- Martyrs Evagrius, Priscian and Companions, a group of martyrs either in Rome or else in Syria. (Note: "AT Rome, the holy martyrs Evagrius, Priscian, and their companions.")
- Saint Pantalus, Bishop of Basle in Switzerland (451)
- Saints Felix and Cyprian, Bishops in North Africa, with 4966 martyrs, under Hunneric (c. 484) (Note: Two bishops in North Africa, leaders of a great multitude of Orthodox - the number of four thousand nine hundred and sixty-six is usually given- driven to starvation and death in the Sahara Desert by the Arian Vandal King, Hunneric.) (Note: "In Africa, four thousand nine hundred and sixty-six holy confessors and martyrs, in the persecution of the Vandals under the Arian king Hunneric. Some of them were bishops, some priests and deacons, with a multitude of the faithful accompanying them, who were driven into a frightful wilderness for the defence of the Catholic truth. Many of them were cruelly annoyed by the Moorish leaders, and with sharp-pointed spears and stones forced to hasten their march, whilst others, with their feet tied, were dragged like corpses through rough places and mangled in all their limbs. They were finally tortured in different manners, and won the honors of martyrdom. The principal among them were the bishops Felix and Cyprian.")
- Saint Fiace (Fiech), a bishop in Ireland, friend and disciple of St Patrick, in whose honour he wrote a hymn which still exists (5th century) (Note: Probably also commemorated in Cornwall on February 2.)
- Saint Mobhi of Glasnevin (Mobhí Clárainech), one of the Twelve Apostles of Ireland (544)
- Saint Salvinus, Bishop of Verona in Italy (562) (Note: His relics are enshrined in St Stephen's church there.)
- Martyr Edwin of Northumbria, King of Northumbria (633) (Note: In 616 he became King of Northumbria in England, married Ethelburgh of Kent and was baptised by St Paulinus. He fell in battle at Hatfield Chase fighting against pagan Mercians and Welsh and was venerated as a martyr.) (Note: "The life of Edwin, King of Northumbria, is so intimately mixed up with that of S. Paulinus of York, that the reader is referred for it to the life of this latter saint, on Oct. 10th.")
- Saint Wilfrid, Bishop of York and Confessor (709) (Note: Born in Ripon in England, he became a monk at Lindisfarne. After a short stay in Canterbury he went to France and Rome (653-657). On his return to Northumbria he founded the monastery of Ripon and in 668 played a leading part in the Council of Whitby. The rest of his life was occupied with journeys and missionary work among the Frisians and in Sussex. His zeal made him an important if controversial figure.)
- Saints Herlindis and Relindis, Daughters of Count Adelard, who became respectively the first and second abbesses of Maaseik Abbey (c. 745 and 750)

== Post-Schism Orthodox saints ==
- Saint Epiktitos the Wonderworker, and with him several ascetics of the "300 Allemagne Saints", in Cyprus (12th century): (Note: Saint Epiktitos the Wonderworker is described as one of the "300 Allemagne Saints" in Cyprus. The 300 Allemagne Saints came to Cyprus from Palestine, and lived as ascetics in various parts of the island. According to some of their lives in the Great Synaxaristes, after the dissolution of the Second Crusade (1147 - 1149), they decided to live the monastic life in the Jordan desert. However since the Latins there disturbed them, they relocated to Cyprus and dispersed over the island.)

- Saints Valantios; Varlaam; Barnabus the Monk; Basil the Bishop; George (Vavatsiniotis); George (Epitideiotis); George (Perachoritis); George (Salamanis); Dimitrianos the Bishop; Irenikos (or Arniakos); Elpidios; and Epahroditos.

- Venerable Saints Amphilochius (1452), Macarius (1480), and Tarasius (1440), Abbots, and Theodosius, monk (15th century), of Glushitsa Monastery, Vologda, disciples of St. Dionysius of Glushitsa. (Note: See: (in Russian) Амфилохий Глушицкий. Википе́дия. (Russian Wikipedia).)
- Archpriest Kiril Cvjetkovic, Confessor of Bezdin and Dalmatia-Boka (1857) (Note: St. Kiril (Cvjetković) (1791-1857) was a monk and confessor who steadfastly defended Orthodoxy against Uniatism in Dalmatia, suffering twenty-five years of imprisonment and exile for his faith before his death in Bezdin Monastery.)
- Saint Arsenius, Archimandrite, of Svyatogorsk Monastery (1859)
- Saint Euphrosyne (Mezenova) the Faster, Schema-Abbess, of Siberia (1918)

=== New Martys and Confessors ===
- New Hieromartyr John Letnikov (1930)
- New Hieromartyr Juvenal (Maslovsky), Archbishop of Ryazan (1937)
- New Hieromartyr Lawrence (Levchenko), Hieromonk, of Optina Monastery (1937)
- New Hieromartyr Alexander Pozdeyevsky, Priest (1940)
- New Hiero-confessor Nicholas (Mogilevsky), Metropolitan of Alma-Ata (1955) (Note: See: (in Russian) Николай (Могилевский). Википе́дия. (Russian Wikipedia).)

== Other commemorations ==
- Apparition of Our Lady of the Pillar (40)
- Icon of the Most Holy Theotokos "Jerusalem" (48)
- Icon of the Mother of God of Yaroslav-Smolensk (1642)
- Icon of the Most Holy Theotokos "Rudensk" (1687)
- Icon of the Most Holy Theotokos "Kaluga" (1812) (Note: See: (in Russian) Калужская икона Божией Матери. Википе́дия. (Russian Wikipedia).)
- Commemoration of Saint Dismas the Good Thief in Thessaloniki (1st century) (see also: March 25)
- Translation of a Particle of the Life Giving Cross of the Lord from Malta to Gatchina, together with the Philermia Icon of the Mother of God, (Note: See: (in Russian) Филермская икона Божией Матери. Википе́дия. (Russian Wikipedia).) and the right hand of Saint John the Baptist (1799)
- Translation of the relics of St. Sabbas the Sanctified from Rome to Jerusalem (1965) (Note: The translation of the Holy Relics of Venerable Sabbas the Sanctified from the church of Sant'Antonin, Venice, back to the Holy Lavra of Saint Sabbas the Sanctified, was preceded by consultations between Pope Paul VI and Patriarch Benedict I of Jerusalem. Saint Sabbas' relics had been stolen by the Crusaders of the First Crusade (1096-1099), along with many other relics, and were brought to Venice and placed in the Church of Sant'Antonin. The delegation from the Patriarchate of Jerusalem in 1965 included Archbishop Vasilios of Jordan (later the Metropolitan of Caesarea); Archimandrite Theodosios - Igumen of Bethany; Archimandrite Seraphim Savvaitis - Igumen of the Holy Lavra of Saint Sabbas the Sanctified; and Hierodeacon Kyriakos (later the Metropolitan of Nazareth). Elder Seraphim Savvaitis (†2003) had written in his memoirs that: "the Pope did not return the holy relics to us because he loved us, but because Saint Sabbas the Sanctified would often appear to him and troubled him to return his relics back to his monastery (i.e. Holy Lavra of Saint Sabbas the Sanctified). When the Pope died without having taken into account the Saint, Saint Sabbas appeared again to his successor. Moreover, in the church where his holy relics were kept within a glass reliquary, the Saint would hit the glass, making trouble and upsetting the guards and the Latin monks.")
- Synaxis of the Saints of Athens (1999) (Note: An encyclical of the Holy Archdiocese of Athens of September 1999 (No. 22/30) decreed that the Synaxis of the Saints of Athens was to be celebrated on October 12 each year: (in Greek) Σύναξη «πάντων των εν τη πόλει των Αθηνών και των περιχώρων διαπρεψάντων αγίων αποστόλων, ιεραρχών και οσίων, των εξ αυτής καταγομένων και των αλλαχόθεν εν αυτοίς αγωνισθέντων και τελειωθέντων».; The date of October 12 coincides with the Liberation of the City of Athens from the German army, on October 12, 1944.)
- Glorification (2009) of St. Philaret (Gumilevsky), Archbishop of Chernigov (1866)

== Icon gallery ==
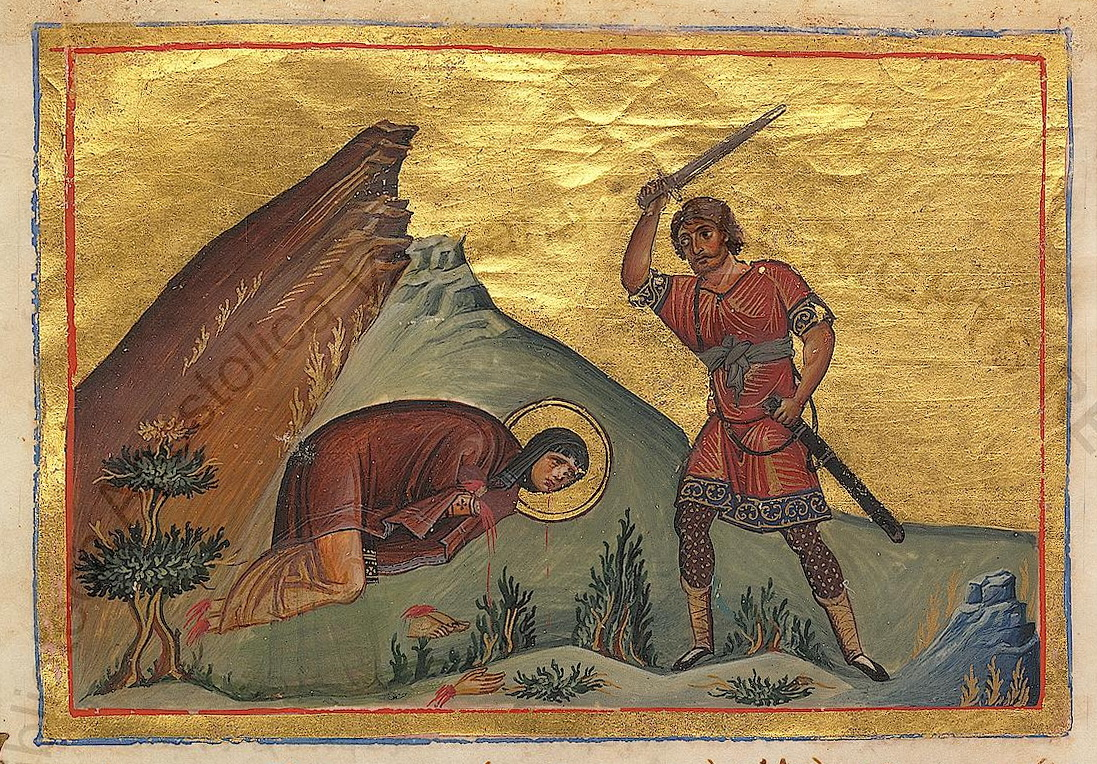
Virgin-martyr Anastasia of Rome.
(Menologion of Basil II, 10th century).

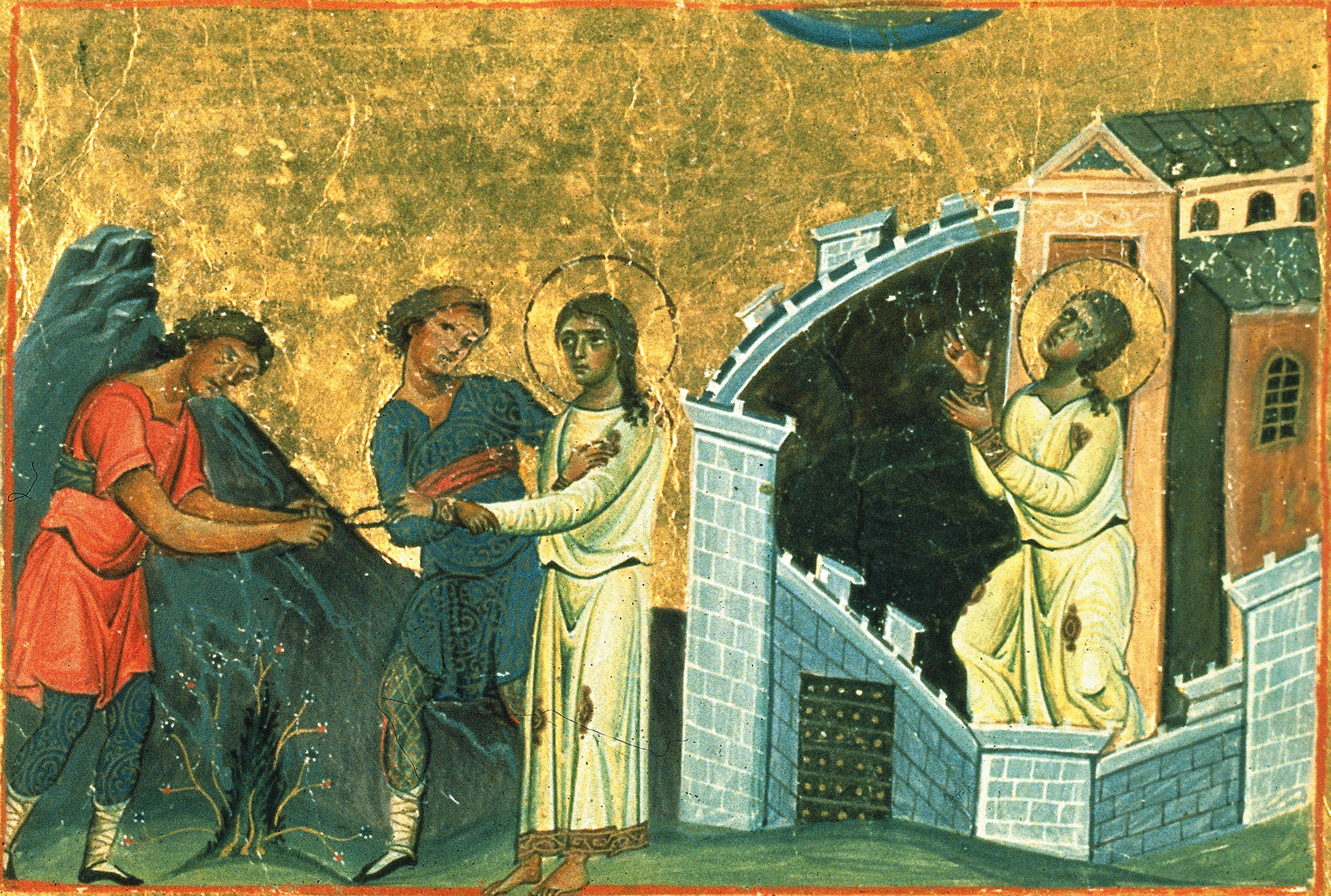
Martyr Domnina of Anazarbus.
(Menologion of Basil II, 10th century).

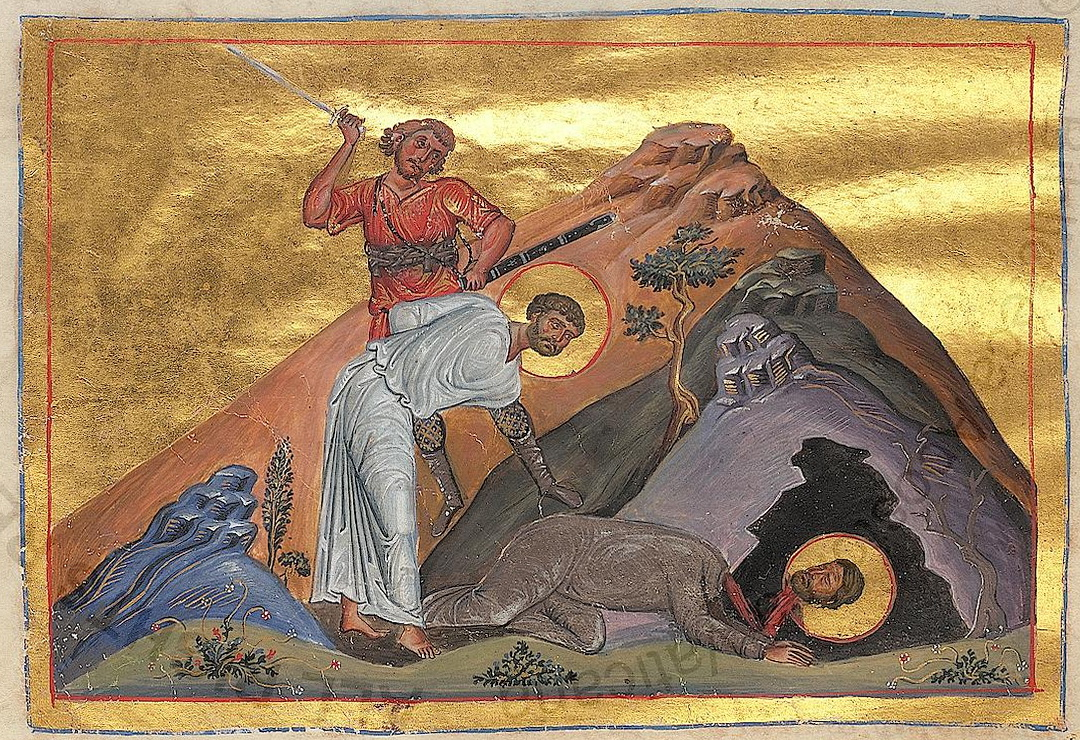
Martyrs Juventinus and Maximinus.
(Menologion of Basil II, 10th century).

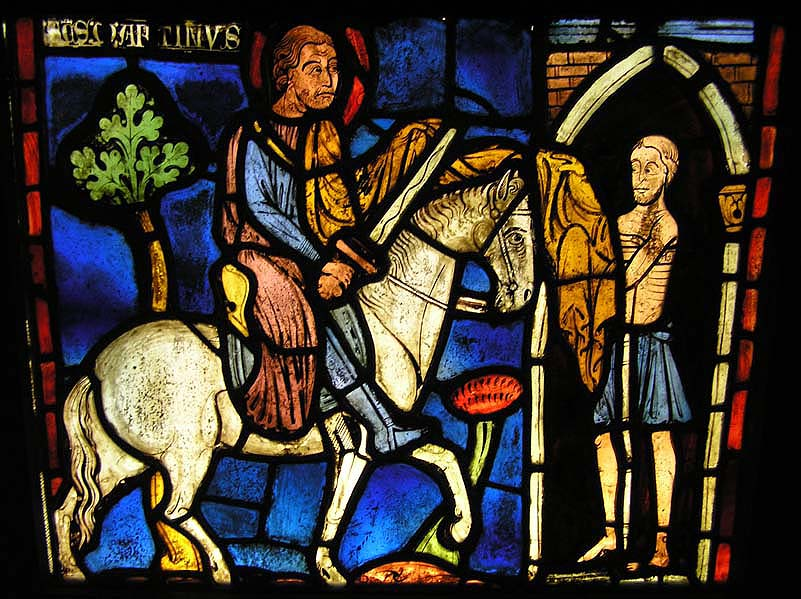
St. Martin the Merciful (Martin of Tours).

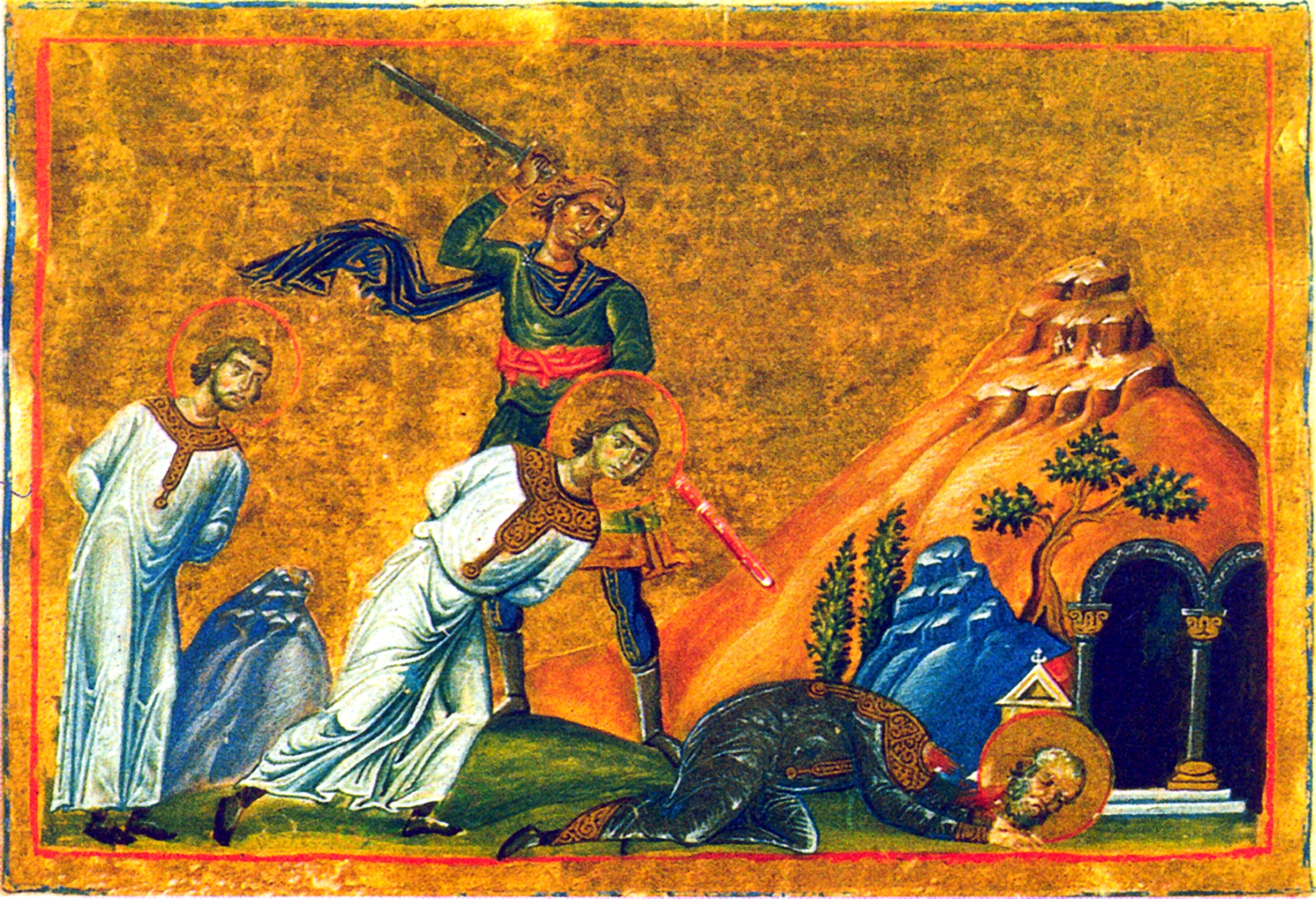
Martyrs Probus, Tarachus, and Andronicus.
(Menologion of Basil II, 10th century).

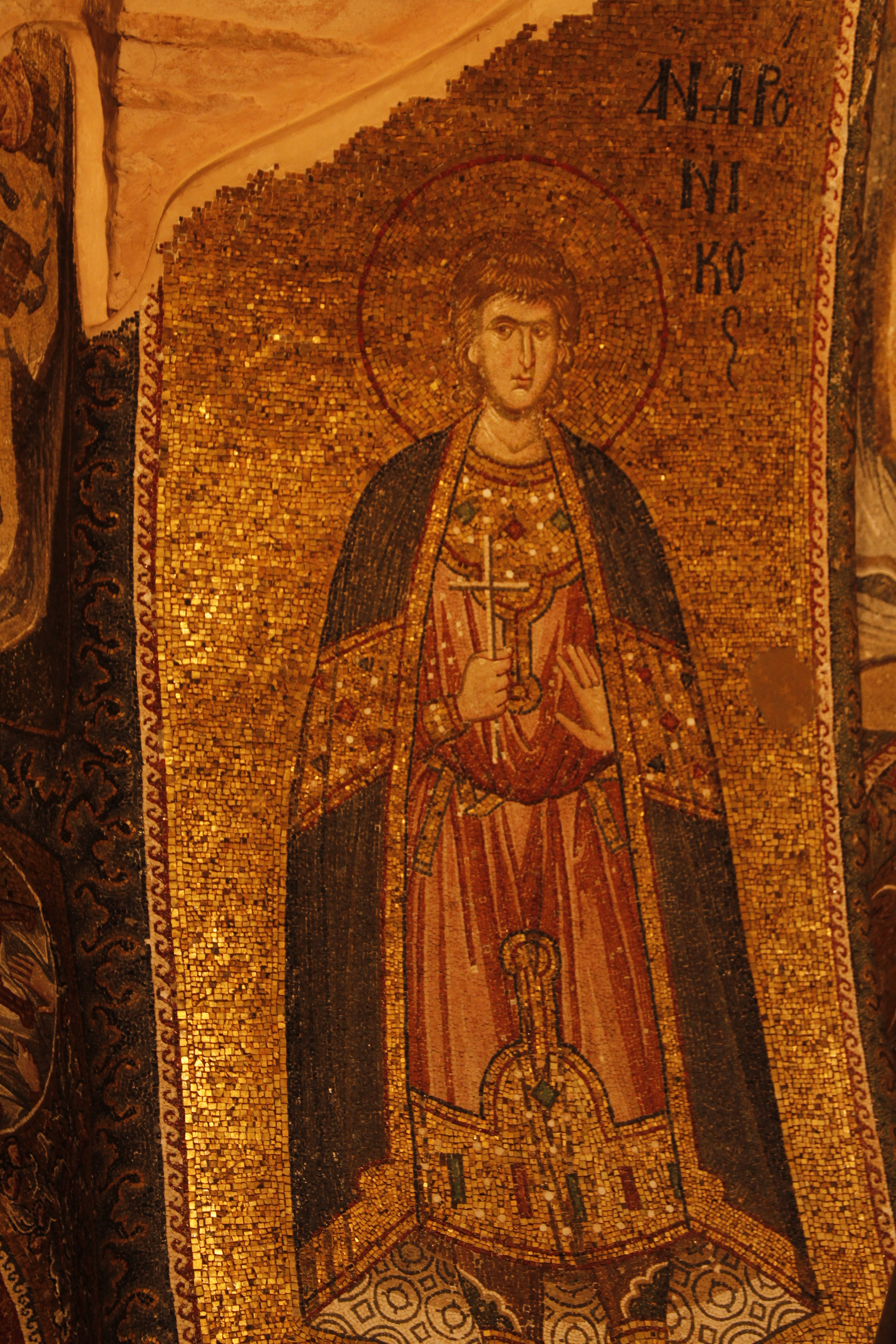
St. Andronicus of Tarsus in Cilicia.

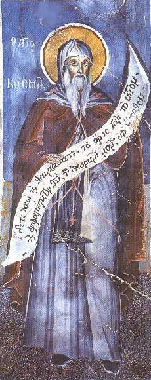
St. Cosmas the Hymnographer, Bishop of Maiuma.

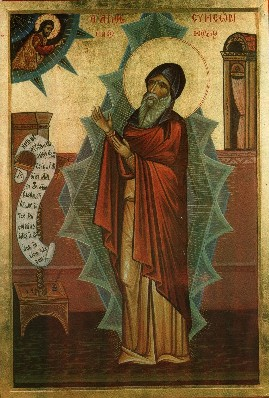
Venerable Symeon the New Theologian.

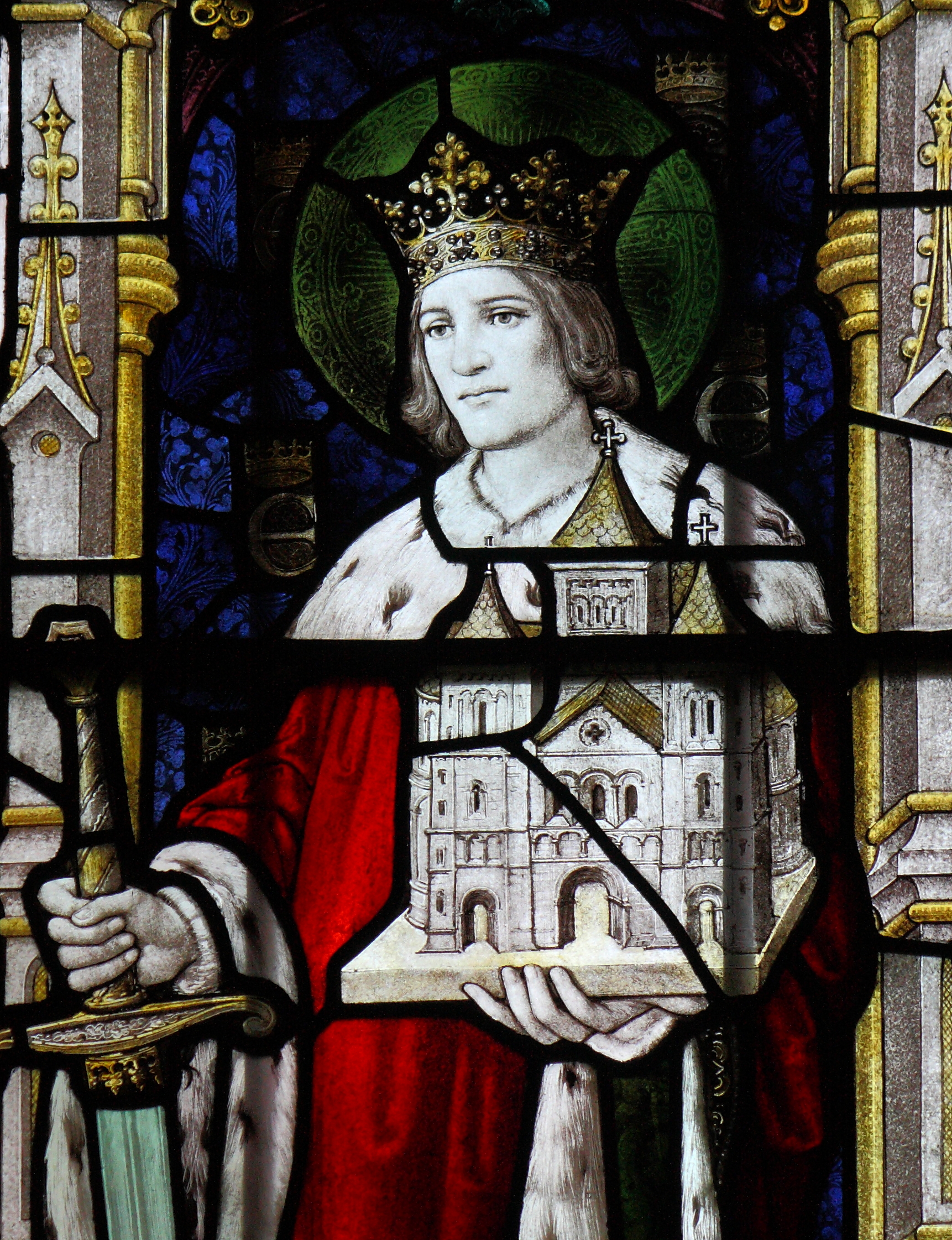
King Edwin of Northumbria.

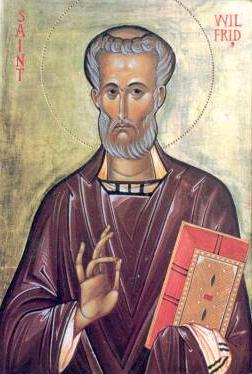
Saint Wilfrid, Bishop of York and Confessor.

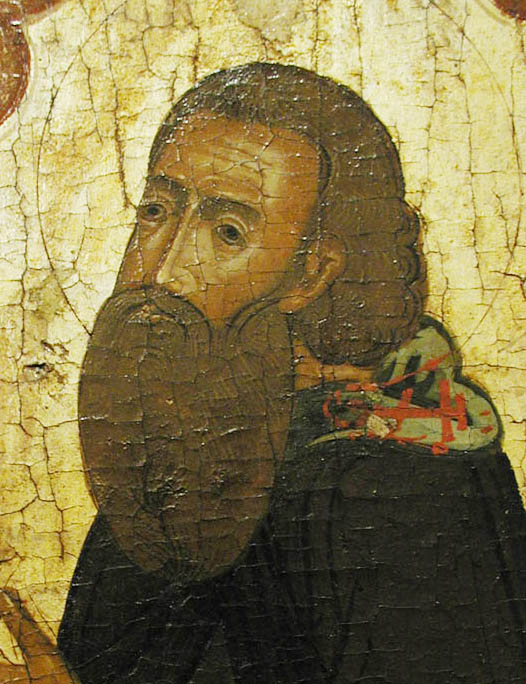
Venerable Amphilochius of Glushitsa Monastery.

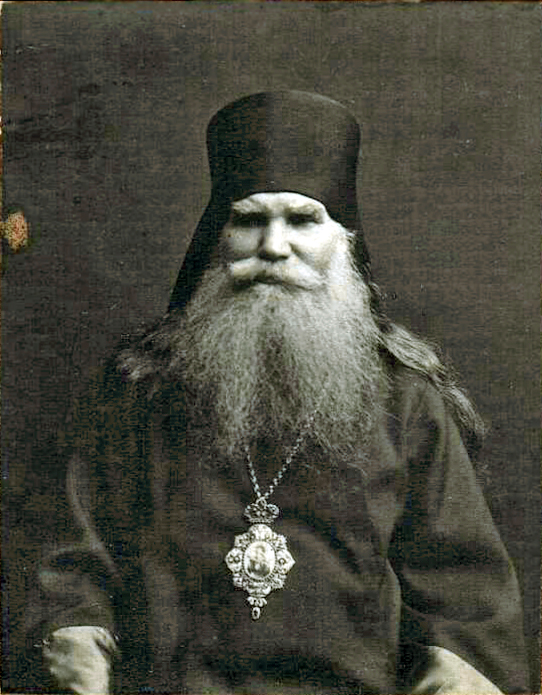
New Hiero-confessor Nicholas (Mogilevsky), Metropolitan of Alma-Ata.

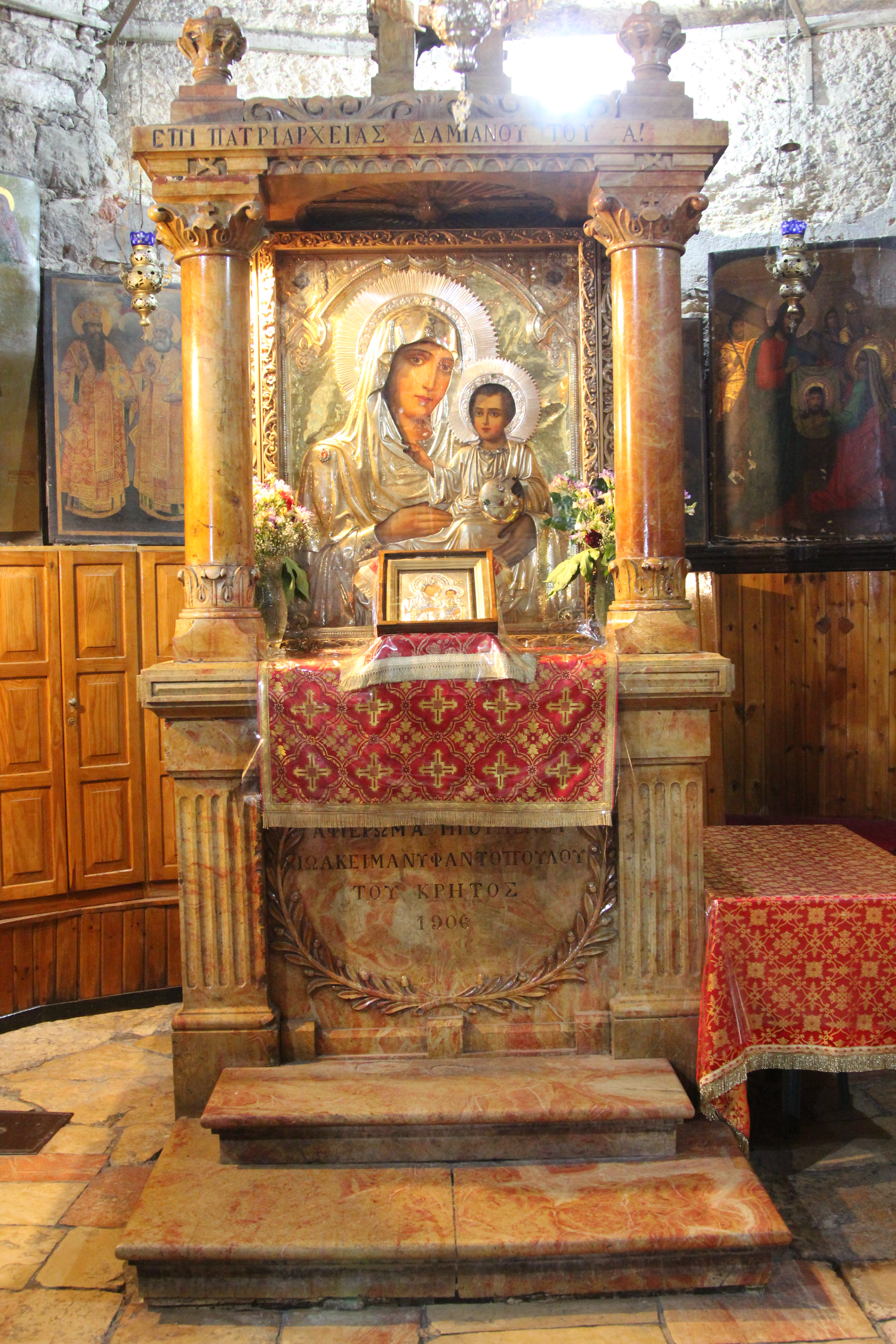
Icon of the Most Holy Theotokos "Jerusalem".

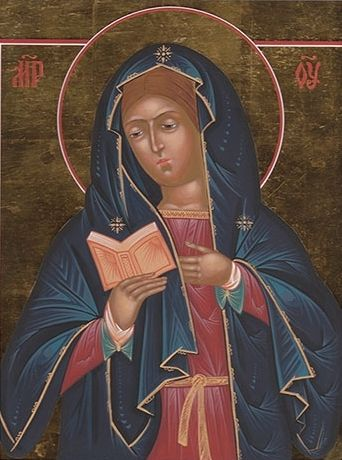
Icon of the Most Holy Theotokos "Kaluga".

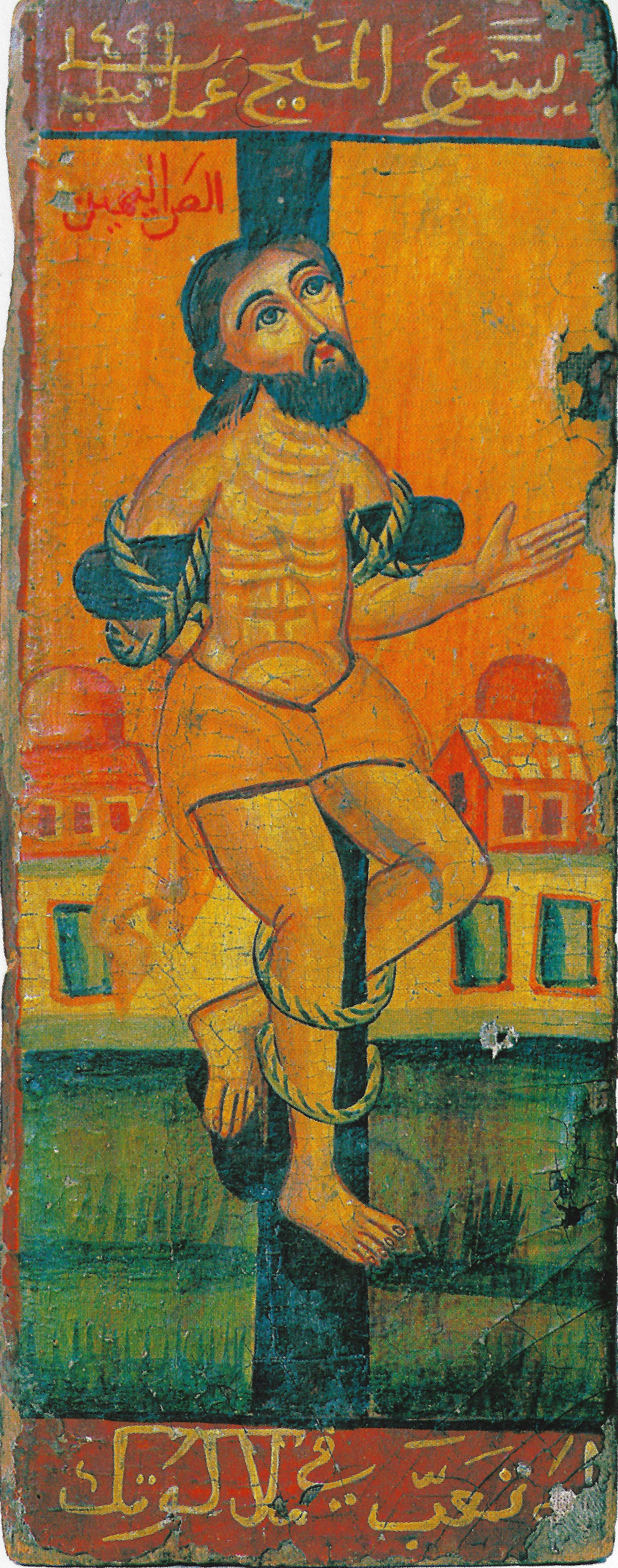
St. Dismas the Good Thief.

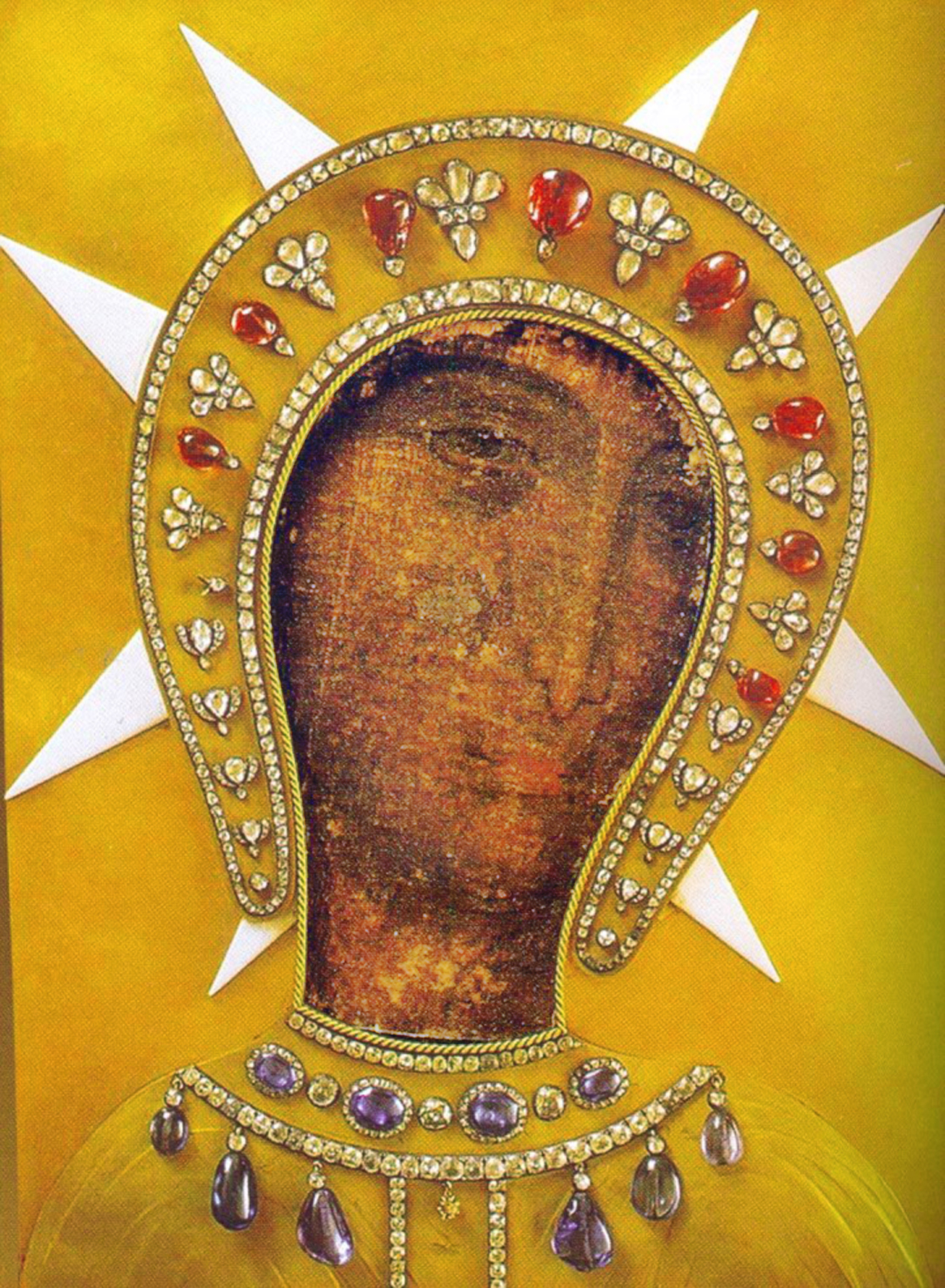
Philermia Icon of the Mother of God.

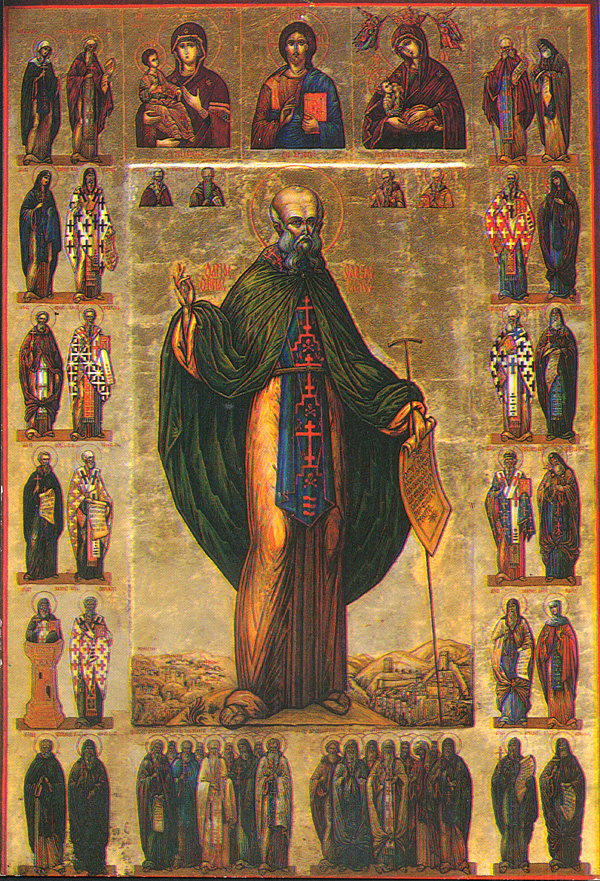
St. Sabbas the Sanctified.

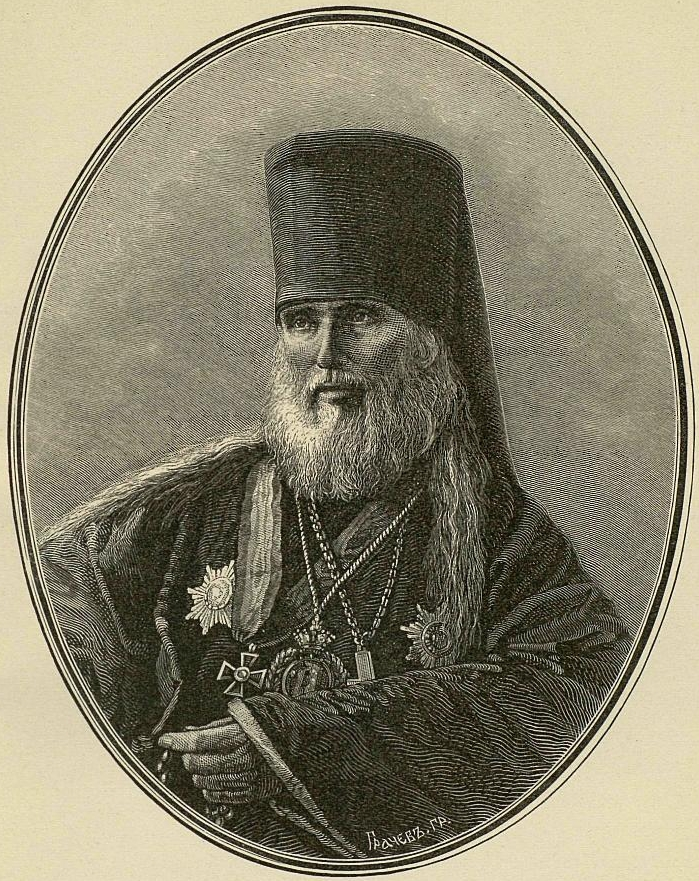
St. Philaret (Gumilevsky), Archbishop of Chernigov.

== Sources ==
- October 12/25. Orthodox Calendar (PRAVOSLAVIE.RU).
- October 25 / October 12. HOLY TRINITY RUSSIAN ORTHODOX CHURCH (A parish of the Patriarchate of Moscow).
- October 12. OCA - The Lives of the Saints.
- The Autonomous Orthodox Metropolia of Western Europe and the Americas (ROCOR). St. Hilarion Calendar of Saints for the year of our Lord 2004. St. Hilarion Press (Austin, TX). p. 76.
- The Twelfth Day of the Month of October. Orthodoxy in China.
- October 12. Latin Saints of the Orthodox Patriarchate of Rome.
- The Roman Martyrology. Transl. by the Archbishop of Baltimore. Last Edition, According to the Copy Printed at Rome in 1914. Revised Edition, with the Imprimatur of His Eminence Cardinal Gibbons. Baltimore: John Murphy Company, 1916. pp. 315–316.
- Rev. Richard Stanton. A Menology of England and Wales, or, Brief Memorials of the Ancient British and English Saints Arranged According to the Calendar, Together with the Martyrs of the 16th and 17th Centuries. London: Burns & Oates, 1892. pp. 487–491.

Greek Sources

- Great Synaxaristes: (in Greek) 12 ΟΚΤΩΒΡΙΟΥ. ΜΕΓΑΣ ΣΥΝΑΞΑΡΙΣΤΗΣ.
- (in Greek) Συναξαριστής. 12 Οκτωβρίου. ECCLESIA.GR. (H ΕΚΚΛΗΣΙΑ ΤΗΣ ΕΛΛΑΔΟΣ).
- (in Greek) 12/10/2017. Ορθόδοξος Συναξαριστής.

Russian Sources

- (in Russian) 25 октября (12 октября). Православная Энциклопедия под редакцией Патриарха Московского и всея Руси Кирилла (электронная версия). (Orthodox Encyclopedia - Pravenc.ru).
- (in Russian) 12 октября по старому стилю / 25 октября по новому стилю. Русская Православная Церковь - Православный церковный календарь на 2016 год.
