= Atroa =

Atroa may refer to:

- Atroa, a deity of the World of Greyhawk
- Atroa, an ancient name of a place in Bithynia, usually identified with Yenişehir, Bursa. See Peter of Atroa and Peter Apselamus, who is also known as Peter of Atroa
