= Serapheim Savvaitis =

Schema-Archimandrite Serapheim (Travassaros) of the Lavra of St. Sabbas the Sanctified, also Serapheim Savvaitis the "Elder of the Desert", or Serapheim Agiotafitis, born Stamatios Travassaros (Greek: Ο Γέρων Σεραφείμ Σαββαΐτης, 1900 – January 8, 2003), (Note: His records in the Patriarchate of Jerusalem state that he was born in 1903, however he himself maintained that the actual year of his birth was 1900.) was the Igumen and spiritual father of the Lavra of Saint Sabbas the Sanctified, in the Bethlehem Governorate of the West Bank, from 1957 to 2003. He was also the founder of the Sanctuary of the Shepherds' Field in Beit Sahour, begun in 1971 as a metochion of the Lavra of St. Sabbas and consecrated in 1989. (Note: Beit Sahour, originally known as the Village of the Shepherds, is now an eastern suburb of Bethlehem.)

== Life ==
=== Early years ===
Stamatios Travassaros was born in 1900, in the Travassarianika settlement in Kythira, in the Ionian Islands region of Greece. (Note: In former times and up to the nineteenth century, Kythira was known as a small and closed society of people with strict practices and codes of conduct.) He was the sixth child in his family, having four sisters and one brother. His family were shepherds and were well-to-do.

His childhood years were devoted austerely to traditional Orthodoxy. His mother Maria was Stamatios' first instructor and guide to the faith. She observed the fasts of the Church strictly and handed down this practice to her children.

By his own account he completed only the third grade of the public school in Kythira, saying that he was particularly interested in the subjects of mathematics and religion. In class, the daily readings were taken from the Psalter and the Octoechos. However, despite his interest in learning, he was unable to finish public school due to his family's needs, thus becoming a shepherd to tend to the flocks. In this way he spent his childhood years, in work, in prayer and with obedience.

In 1922 at the difficult time of the Asia Minor Catastrophe, Stamatios started his mandatory military service, being released from the army in 1925.

=== In Australia ===
In 1926, he travelled to Australia, going first to Sydney and then to Melbourne. He worked as a waiter at various establishments to support his family, and lived in lofts in order to save money. He did not spend his free time in frivolous pursuits, but rather preferred to read about the lives of the Saints and the ways which he could become closer to God. This focus, together with attending church services regularly as well as everyday prayer sustained Stamatios in his youth. He particularly enjoyed reading the Evergetinos, the Philokalia, and the life of Venerable John Kalibytes, the "hut-dweller" of Constantinople (January 15), a saint who influenced him greatly. From this time onwards Stamatios increasingly devoted the direction of his life towards monasticism. While living abroad in this distant land, he prayed to the Theotokos "Myrtidiotissa" of Kythira (September 24) for support as his intercessor.

In 1927, he made the decision to pursue the monastic life, validating his long-held desire for monasticism. Originally he thought of becoming a monk at the Monastery of Panagia ""Myrtidiotissa" in Kythira, however since this was an inactive monastery, he decided to go to Mount Athos instead. He left Australia in complete secrecy, not even telling his family about his plans to go to Mount Athos.

=== In the Holy Land and Monastic Tonsure ===
He reached Port Said in Egypt on March 14, 1932, and departed on Saturday March 20 on the Italian passenger ship SS Tevere, reaching Joppa on Sunday March 21, 1932. From there he took a train to Jerusalem, beginning a pilgrimage to visit all of the Holy Sites, beginning with the Monastery of Martha and Mary in Bethany, and ending at the Church of the Holy Sepulchre.

Next he went to visit the Patriarchate of Jerusalem. At the gates of the Patriarchate, he met a monk from Saint Savvas Monastery who told him that the Igumen of Saint Savvas Lavra also originated from the island of Kythira. The monk also suggested to Stamatios that he should remain there and become a monk of the Brotherhood of the Holy Sepulchre as well. Stamatios later recorded in his journal that his trip from Jerusalem to Saint Savvas Lavra was momentous for him, and that he was overcome by the sanctity of his surroundings and of this monastery. This is when he decided that the purpose of his life was to remain there permanently.

On April 21, 1932, he was received as a novice-monk. After his first all-night vigil, he returned to his cell to rest; however his Elder Panteleimon (Tsampiras) followed him and suggested that he ought to be praying not sleeping. In the following years, Stamatios was formed by obedience to God and by spiritual vigilance with unceasing prayer. His exposure to the asceticism of the Sabbaite fathers, together with the austerity of the monastic life and the harshness of life in the Judaean Desert, seasoned his character and confirmed his will to remain a monk.

On April 27, 1932, he was tonsured a rassophore monk by his Elder, Igumen Panteleimon (Tsampiras) at Saint Savvas Monastery. After his first full confession to his Elder on April 26, 1933, he was given a penitential canon to abstain from receiving Holy Communion for three years, to pray his 300-knot Prayer rope fifteen times daily, to make 200 full prostrations, and to receive Holy Water (of the Great Blessing) on Holy Thursday, on Pascha, on the Nativity, and on the Feast of the Holy Apostles.

On March 18, 1934, he was tonsured to the Small Schema at the Monastery of Kastellion in the Judaean Desert, (Note: The Metochion of Kastellion was a few kilometers away from the main Lavra. It was founded in 492 AD by St. Sabbas the Sanctified. St. John Climacus referred to it as "The Prison". From the outset, this was the residence of the advanced spiritual fathers of St. Savvas Lavra, and the small brotherhood of Kastellion brought forth many important ascetics. For example, Elder Panteleimon (Tsampiras) never slept lying down in a bed, but always seated; after he reposed he was regarded as a holy man among the "Agiotafites" monks, who gave him the title "The Last Ascetic of the Desert". Another ascetic, Hieromonk Melchisedek, was a great faster who could last up to 20 days without starving. The ascetics who went to this eremitic monastery were those who had the grace of total silence and who were advanced Sabbaite fathers over the age of sixty years old. Around 1937 the British authorities advised the Sabbaite Fathers to distance themselves from the Kastellion for their own safety, because some of the neighboring Arabs began demanding money from the fathers, and therefore the monks complied. From that time to this day, the Kastellion, which was the first metochion of the Saint Sabbas Lavra, has remained uninhabited.) which was the metochion of the Saint Savvas Lavra, and he was given the name Sophronios. At certain times when Elder Panteleimon was absent from the Kastellion, Fr. Sophronios could hear the voices of demons calling out his name, "Sophronios, Sophronios", or uttering "Amen" at the end of the services, hoping to terrify the young monk. In these times he ran to the seat of his spiritual Elder, and prayed for deliverance from the demons.

On March 13, 1939, he was tonsured a Schemamonk in the Lavra of Saint Sabbas, on the Sunday of Saint Mary of Egypt, by hieromonk Sabbas, and he was renamed Serapheim.

On December 15, 1947, following a resolution of the Holy Synod of the Patriarchate of Jerusalem, he was ordained a hierodeacon at the Church of the Holy Sepulchre, by his beatitude Metropolitan Philotheos of Eleutheropolis. On December 22, 1947, for the first time he served the Divine Liturgy at St. Sabbas Monastery, with hieromonk Sabbas (Naipin).

On February 10, 1949, following a resolution of the Holy Synod of the Patriarchate of Jerusalem, he was appointed the warden and oeconomus of the Lavra of Saint Savvas the Sanctfied, having been distinguished by his asceticism and hesychasm.

On September 19, 1949, he was ordained a hieromonk at the Church of the Holy Sepulchre, by his beatitude Archbishop Athenagoras of Sebasteia, warden of the Patriarchate of Jerusalem.

From that time until 1957 he continuously served at the Lavra of St. Sabbas. He was also raised to the office of Archimandrite, receiving the pectoral cross.

=== Igumen of Saint Savvas Lavra ===
In 1957 after the death of his spiritual father Igumen Sabbas, Serapheim assumed the spiritual and administrative reins of the monastery, by the decision of the Holy Synod of the Patriarchate of Jerusalem.

In 1965 the translation of the Holy Relics of Venerable Sabbas the Sanctified took place from the church of Sant'Antonin, Venice, back to the Holy Lavra of Saint Sabbas the Sanctified, preceded by consultations between Pope Paul VI and Patriarch Benedict I of Jerusalem. Saint Sabbas' relics had been stolen by the Crusaders of the First Crusade, along with many other relics, and had been brought to Venice and placed in the Church of Sant'Antonin. The delegation from the Patriarchate of Jerusalem in 1965 included Archbishop Vasilios of Jordan (later the Matropolitan of Caesarea), Archimandrite Theodosios, Igumen of Bethany, Archimandrite Seraphim Savvaitis, Igumen of the Holy Lavra of Saint Sabbas the Sanctified, and Hierodeacon Kyriakos (later the Metropolitan of Nazareth). (Note: Elder Seraphim Savvaitis (†2003) had written in his memoirs that: "the Pope did not return the holy relics to us because he loved us, but because Saint Sabbas the Sanctified would often appear to him and troubled him to return his relics back to his monastery (i.e. back to the Lavra of Saint Sabbas the Sanctified). When the Pope died without having taken into account the Saint, Saint Sabbas appeared again to his successor. Moreover, in the church where his holy relics were kept within a glass reliquary, the Saint would hit the glass, making trouble and upsetting the guards and the Latin monks.")

On July 22, 1971, the erection of the Holy Sanctuary of the Shepherds' Field in Beit Sahour began, through the resolution and the blessing of Patriarch Benedict I of Jerusalem and the Holy Synod of the Patriarchate of Jerusalem, who appointed Elder Serapheim Savvaitis for this initiative. It was completed and consecrated on July 27, 1989, with Patriarch Diodoros I of Jerusalem presiding.

He performed his duties as abbot virtually until his death, being aided in his final years by Archimandrite Eudokimos, who eventually succeeded him as the Igumen.

== Death ==
Before his death, Elder Serapheim had been honored by Patriarch Irenaios of Jerusalem with the Order of the Grand Cross (Μεγαλόσταυρος).

He died in the 102nd year of his life, in his cell, in the Sanctuary of the Shepherds' Field in Beit Sahour. It was 8:00am on January 8, 2003 / December 26, 2002, which was the feast day of this Sanctuary.

He was buried in the Lavra of Saint Savvas the Sanctified, which he had served for more than 70 years.

== Sources ==
- (in Greek) Νικηφόρος Καλαϊτζίδης (Πρωτοπρεσβύτερος). Ο γέρων Σεραφείμ Σαββαΐτης. Μυγδονία. Δεκέμβριος 2004. ISBN 9789607666437
- (in Greek) ΕΚΟΙΜΗΘΕΙ Ο ΓΕΡΟΝΤΑΣ ΤΗΣ ΕΡΗΜΟΥ ΣΕΡΑΦΕΙΜ ΣΑΒΒΑΙΤΗΣ. Εφημερίς Ορθόδοξος Τύπος (Orthodoxos Typos). 7 Φεβρουαρίου 2003.
