= Peter of Atroa =

Saint Peter of Atroa
- Born: AD 773
- Died: AD 837; Atroa, Bithynia (modern-day Anatolia, Turkey)
- Venerated in: Eastern Orthodox Church Roman Catholicism
- Feast: 3 January

Peter of Atroa (773–837) was an abbot who was later canonized as a saint.

== Biography ==
He was born the eldest of three children. His given name was Theophylact. At eighteen, he determined to become a monk and joined Paul the Hesychast at his hermitage in Phrygia, where he took the religious name "Peter".

The two of them started a pilgrimage to Jerusalem, but, reportedly because of a vision, they went instead to Bithynia. There Paul established a monastery at the church of St. Zachary in the area of Atroa. The monastery grew quickly, and Paul named Peter as his successor on the former's death in 805.

Leo V the Armenian was in power at the time, and supported the Iconoclasts in their efforts to destroy religious imagery. Peter was forced to disband the monastery for the safety of the monks during these persecutions, himself travelling first to Ephesus and later Cyprus. His reputation as a thaumaturge and spiritual director had become widespread by this time, and he was rarely left to pursue the secluded life he sought in peace. He wandered throughout the area in his efforts to find seclusion, ultimately finding some privacy in the area of Coracesium in Cilicia.

Upon the death of Leo V, the iconoclast persecution dissipated, permitting internal struggles within the church to rise to the forefront. One of these involved accusations by several bishops and abbots that Peter exorcised demons not by the power of God, but rather the power of Beelzebub. Peter tried to convince them otherwise, unsuccessfully, and ultimately had to seek the help of Theodore the Studite in persuading them. Theodore wrote a letter to all the monks of the area, telling them that Peter was in fact above reproach in conduct, teachings, and beliefs, and was as good a monk as could be found. This letter survives to this day.

Peter then returned to St. Zachary's and helped to reorganize two other monasteries he had established. During this time, he himself resided at a hermitage in Atroa. Iconoclastic attacks broke out again, more virulent than before, and Peter again found himself having to disperse his monks, successfully doing so just barely before the local bishop arrived to forcibly remove them. Peter himself left to reside with a locally famous recluse named James. While living with him, Peter cured Paul of Prusias of a fever. This was ascribed as a miracle at the time, but was apparently accomplished by doing nothing more than giving Paul a good, nutritious meal.

Iconoclast persecution increased in the area, obliging Peter and James to leave for the safety of the monastery of St. Porphyrious on the Hellespont. Peter later left for the Bâlea Lake area, where he visited his friend and fellow opponent of iconoclasm Joannicius before returning again to St. Zachary's. After delivering a final statement of farewell to the assembly, he died in the choir while praying the evening office on 1 January 837.

Peter of Atroa is recognized as a Saint in the Eastern Orthodox Church and his feast day is celebrated on January 3.

He should not be confused with saint Peter Apselamus who is also sometimes called Peter of Atroa.
