= October 14 (Eastern Orthodox liturgics) =

Day in the Eastern Orthodox liturgical calendar

Eastern Orthodox liturgical calendar
October 13	October 14	October 15
October 14 O.S. ≍ October 27 N.S. October 14 N.S ≍ October 1 O.S.

An Eastern Orthodox cross

October 14 in Eastern Orthodox liturgical calendars is a feast day and a day of commemoration of saints and martyrs. Although some Orthodox churches use the Revised Julian Calendar and others use the traditional Julian calendar, the fixed commemorations for their respective October 14 are broadly the same, no matter which calendar is used. (Note: Despite the dates being the same, the days to which they refer typically differ by 13 days. The notation Old Style or O.S. is sometimes used to indicate a date in the traditional Julian Calendar (the "Old Calendar"). The notation New Style or N.S. indicates a date in the Revised Julian calendar (the "New Calendar").)

== Saints ==
- Great-Martyrs Nazarius, Celsius, Gervasius and Protasius, of Milan (54-68) (see also: June 19, July 25)
- Martyr Peter Apselamus of Eleutheropolis in Palestine (309) (Note: "According to Eusebius of Caesarea, The Martyrs of Palestine X, 2 (NPNF II, 24, 351), he died on 11 January".) (see also: January 12)
- Hieromartyr Silvanus of Gaza, Priest, and with him 40 martyrs, by beheading (311) (see also: May 4)
- Saint Cosmas the Hymnographer, Bishop of Maiuma (787) (see also: October 12)
- Venerable Parasceva (Petka) of Epibatima Thrace (Parascevi the New), whose relics are in Iași, Romania (11th century)

== Pre-Schism Western saints ==
- Saint Callixtus I, Pope of Rome (c. 222) (Note: A Greek slave in Rome, he was ordained deacon by Pope Zephyrinus, whom he succeeded in 217. He condemned Sabellianism and other heresies, but was forgiving and tolerant to those whom rigorists regarded as sinners. As a deacon he had cared for the cemetery on the Appian Way, which is known by his name. He was probably martyred in Todi in Italy.) (Note: "AT Rome, on the Aurelian road, the birthday of blessed Callistus, pope and martyr. By order of the emperor Alexander, after being a long time kept in prison without food, and daily scourged with rods, he was finally hurled from the window of the house in which he had been shut up, and cast into a well, and thus merited the triumph awarded to conquerors.")
- Saint Gaudentius of Rimini, Bishop of Rimini and Martyr (360) (Note: Born in Asia Minor, he became Bishop of Rimini in Italy in 346. He suffered much at the hands of the Arians who dominated the Council of 357 and he was martyred by them.)
- Saint Donatian of Reims (Donas), Bishop of Rheims (390) (Note: Born in Rome, he became Bishop of Rheims in France from 360 to 390. His relics were translated to Bruges in Belgium in the ninth century and he has since been venerated as the patron-saint of Bruges.)
- Saint Justus of Lyon, Bishop of Lyon (390) (Note: A deacon in Vienne who became Bishop of Lyon in France in 350. In 381 he attended the Council of Aquileia and then went to Egypt and lived as a hermit.) (Note: See: (in French) Just de Lyon. Wikipédia. (French Wikipedia).) (see also: September 2)
- Saint Manehildis (Ménéhould), patroness of Sainte-Menehould (c. 490) (Note: Born in Perthois in France, she was the youngest of seven sisters, all of whom are honoured as saints in various parts of Champagne. She is the patroness of Sainte-Ménéhould. See: (in French) Ménehould. Wikipédia. (French Wikipedia).)
- Saint Fortunatus of Todi, a Bishop of Todi in Italy, who saved the city from being sacked by Totila the Goth (537) (Note: "At Todi, St. Fortunatus, bishop, who, as is mentioned by blessed Gregory, was endowed with an extraordinary gift for casting out unclean spirits.".)
- Saint Rusticus, Bishop of Trier in Germany, he resigned to live at the hermitage of St Goar (574)
- Venerable Mannacus, Abbot at Caer Gybi, Holyhead, Anglesey (6th century) (Note: Abbot of Holyhead in Wales, he was connected with St Cuby. He appears to have reposed in Cornwall and Manaccan (Minster) near Falmouth is said to owe its name to him.)
- Saint Angadresima (Angadrisma, Angadreme), Abbess of Oröer-des-Vierges near Beauvais (c. 695) (Note: A cousin of St Lambert of Lyon and a nun at Fontenelle in France. Eventually she became Abbess of Oröer-des-Vierges near Beauvais.)
- Saint Burchard of Würzburg, first Bishop of Wurzburg, English missionary to Germany (754) (Note: Born in England, he went to Germany with St Boniface (c 732). He became Bishop of Würzburg and founded several monasteries, of which the most important was St Andrew's, later named after him.)
- Saint Bernard of Arce, Confessor (9th century) (Note: Perhaps born in England, he went on pilgrimage to the Holy Land and Rome but stayed there to live as a hermit in Arpino in Italy. His relics are enshrined in Rocca d'Arce.) (Note: At Rocca d'Arce, in the kingdom of Naples, the festival of ST. BERNARD, Confessor. The tradition of the country, in which the remains of this Saint repose, is decidedly that he came from Great Britain, and that he was the companion of St. Ardwyne, St. Gerard, and St. Fulk, in their pilgrimage to the holy places of the East. On their return they spent several years of rigorous solitude and a most austere and holy life on Mount Gargano, and were on their way to Rome, when, one after the other, at different places on the route, they were called to their everlasting rest. Gerard was the first to die at Gallinaro; and a little while later, when the survivors had reached Arpino, Bernard also was taken from their company. He died the death of a Saint, and was buried by the Chapel of St. John, on the road to Rocca d'Arce. It seems to have been in the twelfth century that the fame of his sanctity became widely spread, that is, from the time of his translation to Rocca d'Arce, which was effected in consequence of a heavenly revelation. Subsequent translations have taken place at later times, the last being on 26th June, 1698, from the old Gothic church to a new chapel erected on purpose. The chief festival is held on the 14th October, which is probably the day of the translation from Arpino to Rocca d'Arce, and the secondary feast on the 26th June, in honour of the latter solemnity.")

== Post-Schism Orthodox saints ==
- Venerable Nikola Sviatosha, Prince of Chernigov and Wonderworker, of the Kiev Caves (1143) (Note: See: (in Russian) Николай Святоша. Википе́дия. (Russian Wikipedia).)
- Saint Cosmas, founder of Yakhromsk Monastery, Vladimir (1492) (Note: See: (in Russian) Косма Яхромский. Википе́дия. (Russian Wikipedia).)
- Saint Ignatius the Wonderworker, Metropolitan of Mithymna (1566)

=== New Martys and Confessors ===
- New Hieromartyr Michael Lektorsky, Priest (1921)
- New Hieromartyr Ambrose (Polyansky), Bishop of Kamenetz-Podolsk (1932) (Note: See: (in Russian) Амвросий (Полянский). Википе́дия. (Russian Wikipedia).)
- New Hieromartyr Peter Lebedev, Priest (1937)
- New Hieromartyr Maximilian Marchenko (1938)

== Other commemorations ==
- Death of Harold Godwinson, last Orthodox king of England, and those killed with him at the Battle of Hastings (1066)
- Commemoration of the Miracle of St. Paraskevi on the island of Chios (1442)
- Yakhromsk Icon of the Most Holy Theotokos (15th century)

== Icon gallery ==
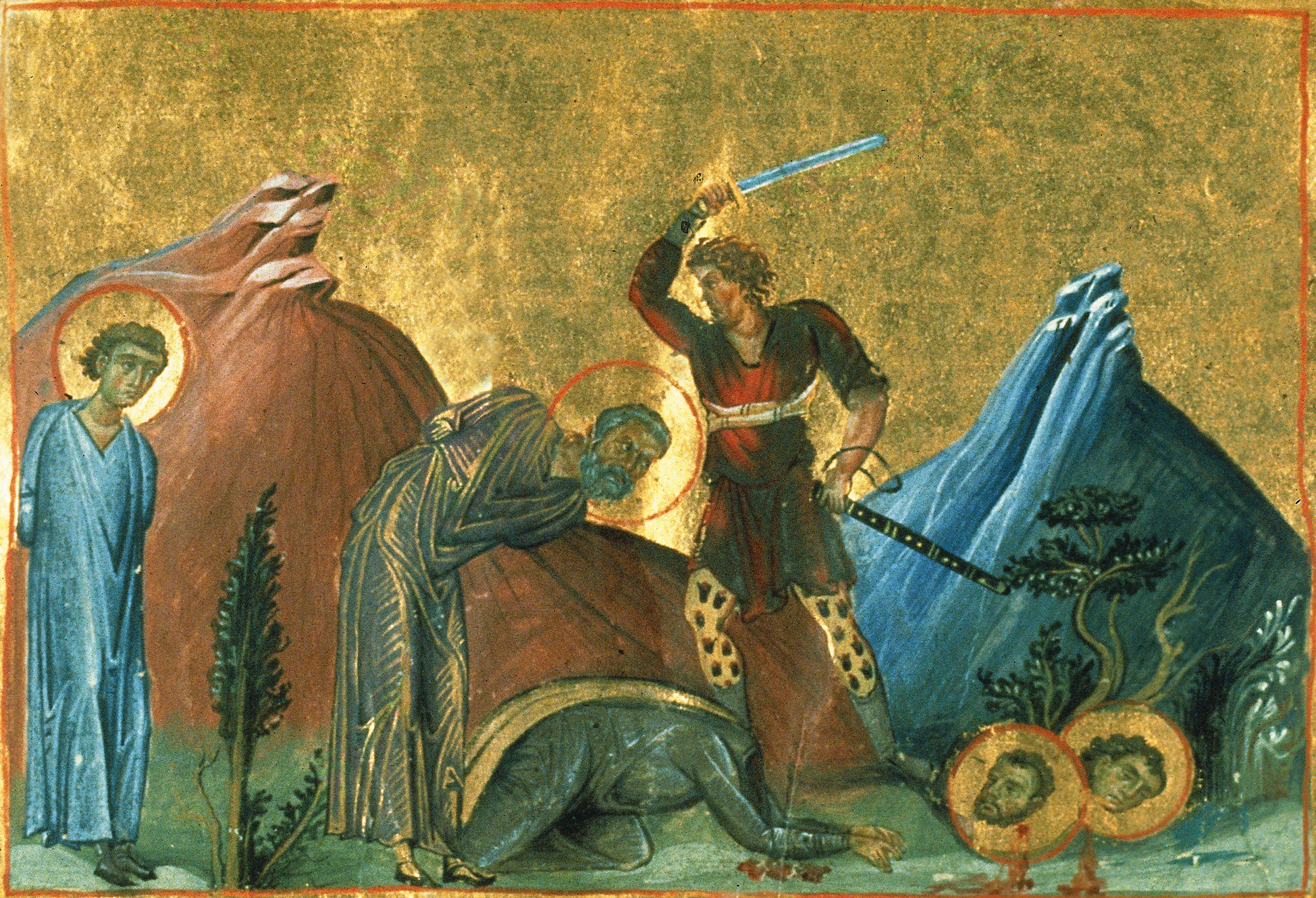
Martyrs Nazarius, Celsius, Gervasius and Protasius, of Milan.
(Menologion of Basil II, 10th century).

Martyr Peter Apselamus of Eleutheropolis in Palestine.
(Menologion of Basil II, 10th century).

Martyr Peter Apselamus.

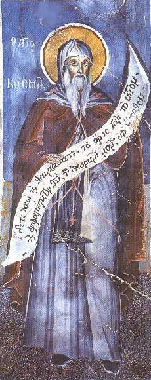
St. Cosmas the Hymnographer, Bishop of Maiuma.

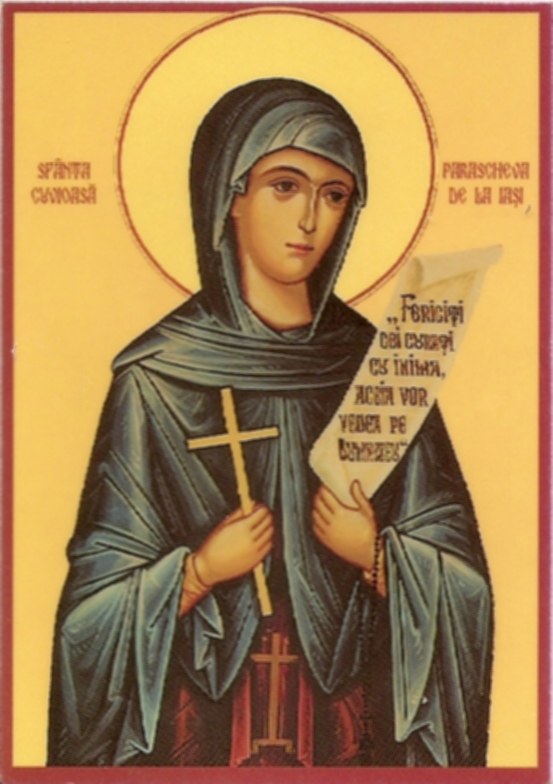
Venerable Parasceva (Petka) of Epibatima Thrace.

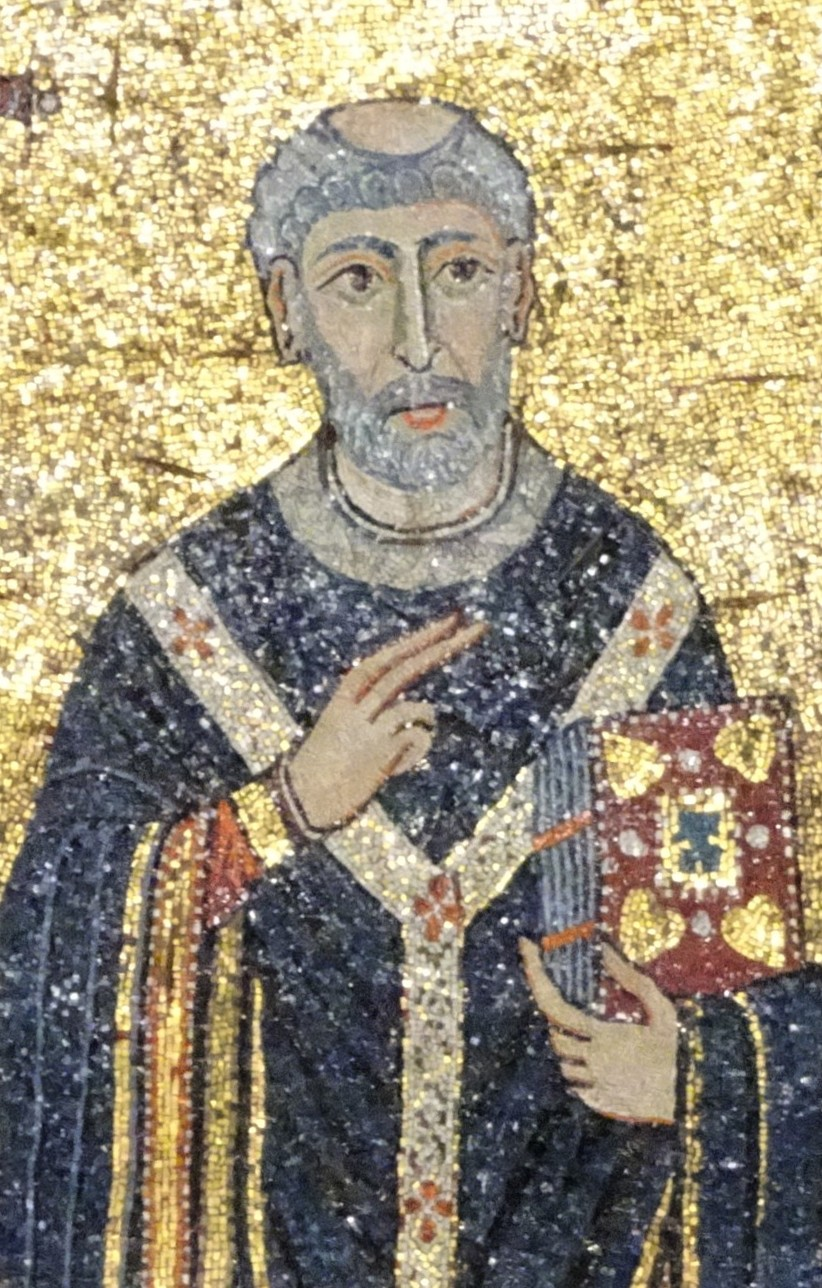
St. Callixtus I, Pope of Rome.

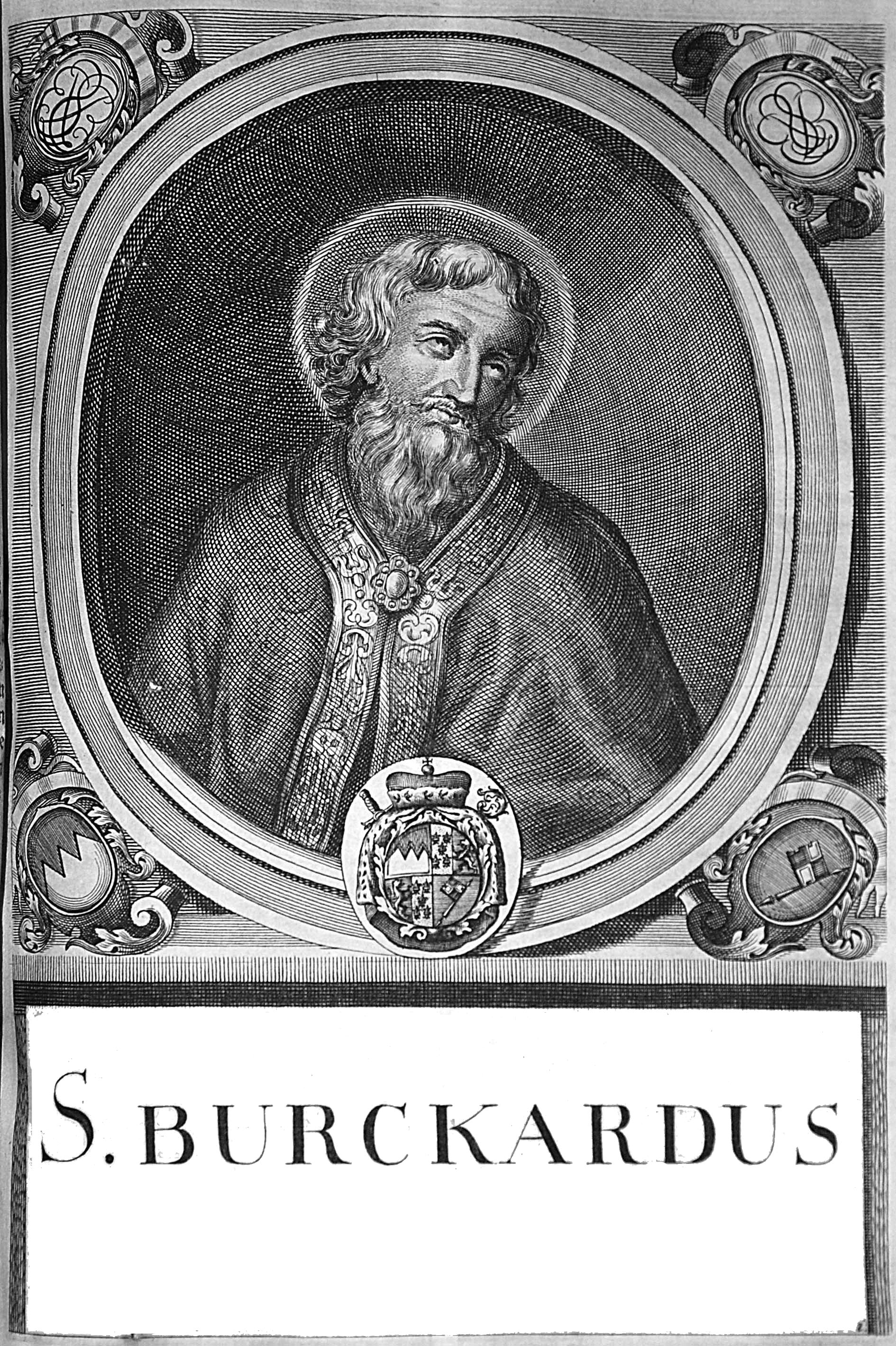
St. Burchard of Würzburg, first Bishop of Wurzburg.

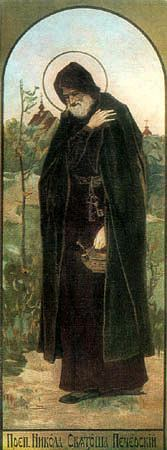
St. Nikola Sviatosha, Prince of Chernigov and Wonderworker, of the Kiev Caves.

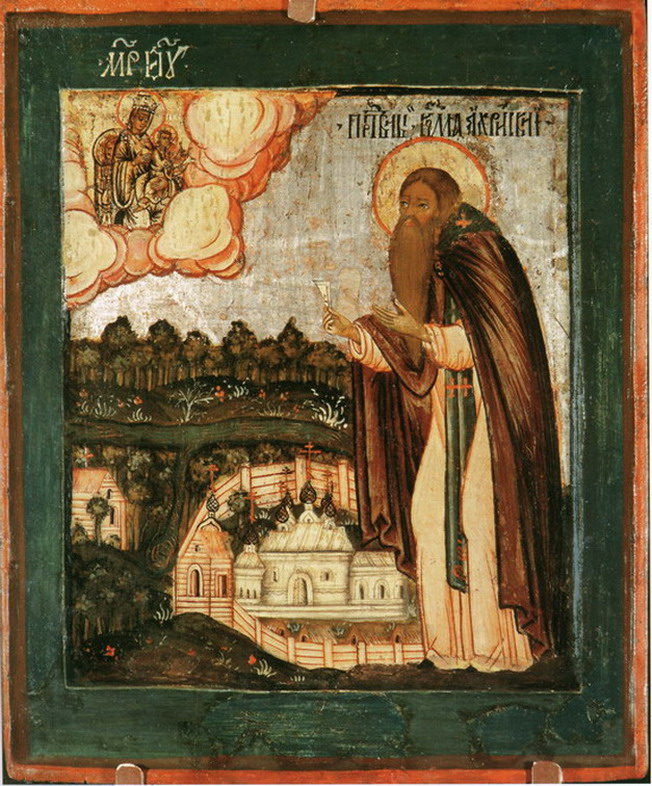
St. Cosmas, founder of Yakhromsk Monastery, Vladimir.

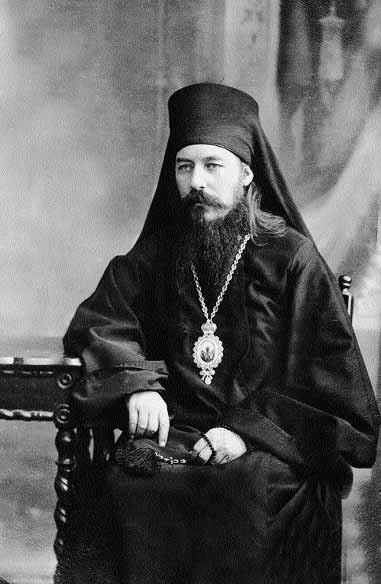
New Hieromartyr Ambrose (Polyansky), Bp. of Kamenetz-Podolsk.

== Sources ==
- October 14/27. Orthodox Calendar (PRAVOSLAVIE.RU).
- October 27 / October 14. HOLY TRINITY RUSSIAN ORTHODOX CHURCH (A parish of the Patriarchate of Moscow).
- October 14. OCA - The Lives of the Saints.
- The Autonomous Orthodox Metropolia of Western Europe and the Americas (ROCOR). St. Hilarion Calendar of Saints for the year of our Lord 2004. St. Hilarion Press (Austin, TX). p. 76.
- The Fourteenth Day of the Month of October. Orthodoxy in China.
- October 14. Latin Saints of the Orthodox Patriarchate of Rome.
- The Roman Martyrology. Transl. by the Archbishop of Baltimore. Last Edition, According to the Copy Printed at Rome in 1914. Revised Edition, with the Imprimatur of His Eminence Cardinal Gibbons. Baltimore: John Murphy Company, 1916. pp. 317–318.
- Rev. Richard Stanton. A Menology of England and Wales, or, Brief Memorials of the Ancient British and English Saints Arranged According to the Calendar, Together with the Martyrs of the 16th and 17th Centuries. London: Burns & Oates, 1892. pp. 492–493.

Greek Sources

- Great Synaxaristes: (in Greek) 14 ΟΚΤΩΒΡΙΟΥ. ΜΕΓΑΣ ΣΥΝΑΞΑΡΙΣΤΗΣ.
- (in Greek) Συναξαριστής. 14 Οκτωβρίου. ECCLESIA.GR. (H ΕΚΚΛΗΣΙΑ ΤΗΣ ΕΛΛΑΔΟΣ).
- (in Greek) 14/10/2017. Ορθόδοξος Συναξαριστής.

Russian Sources

- (in Russian) 27 октября (14 октября). Православная Энциклопедия под редакцией Патриарха Московского и всея Руси Кирилла (электронная версия). (Orthodox Encyclopedia - Pravenc.ru).
- (in Russian) 14 октября по старому стилю / 27 октября по новому стилю. Русская Православная Церковь - Православный церковный календарь на 2016 год.
