= Benjamin the Deacon and Martyr =

Persian Christian saint

Saint Benjamin the Deacon
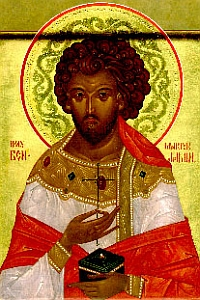
- An Eastern Orthodox icon of Saint Benjamin

Deacon, Hieromartyr
- Born: c. 329 AD; Persia
- Died: c. 424 AD; Persia
- Venerated in: Catholic Church; Eastern Orthodox Church; Oriental Orthodox Church
- Feast: March 31 (Catholic Church and Eastern Orthodox; with Abdas of Susa); October 13 (Eastern Orthodox, Byzantine Catholic)

Benjamin (c. 329 AD – c. 424 AD) was a deacon martyred around 424 in Persia. Benjamin was executed during a period of persecution of Christians that lasted forty years and through the reign of two Persian kings: Isdegerd I, who died in 421, and his son and successor, Varanes V. Varanes carried on the persecution with such great fury that Christians were submitted to the most cruel tortures.

== Martyrdom ==
Benjamin was imprisoned for a year for his Christian faith, and later released with the condition that he abandon preaching or speaking of his religion. His release was obtained by the Eastern Roman Emperor Theodosius II through an ambassador. However, Benjamin declared that it was his duty to preach about Christ and that he could not be silent. As a consequence, he was tortured mercilessly until his death in the year 424, specifically, "sharpened reeds [were] stuck under the nails of his fingers and toes."

According to his hagiography, when the king was apprised that Benjamin refused to stop preaching, he "... caused reeds to be run in between the nails and the flesh, both of his hands and feet, and to be thrust into other most tender parts, and drawn out again, and this to be frequently repeated with violence. Lastly, a knotty stake was thrust into his bowels, to rend and tear them, in which torment he expired..."

== Veneration ==
Benjamin's feast day is celebrated on October 13 in the Eastern Orthodox Church and the Byzantine Rite Eastern Catholic Churches. Benjamin's feast day is celebrated on March 31 by the Catholic Church and the Syriac churches. He is mentioned also in the Roman Martyrology, but has not been included in the General Roman Calendar.

== See also ==
- Abdas of Susa
- Christianity in Iran
- Forty Martyrs of Sebaste
- Persian martyr acts
- Saint Benjamin the Deacon and Martyr, patron saint archive
