= Domnina of Anazarbus =

Saint Domnina of Anazarbus
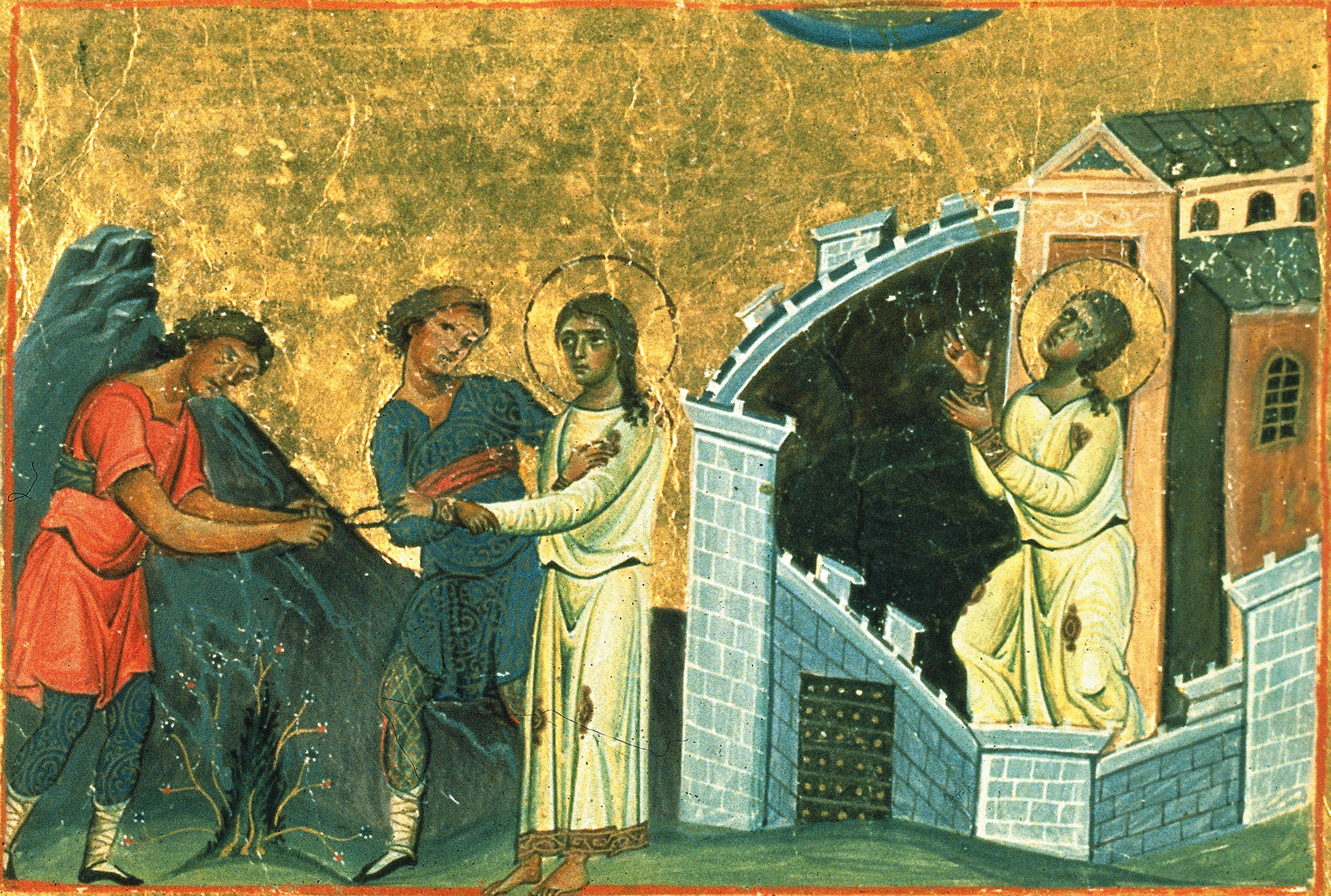

Martyr
- Died: 286 AD; Anazarbus, Asia Minor (modern-day Aǧaçli, Adana, Turkey)
- Venerated in: Roman Catholic Church; Eastern Orthodox Church
- Feast: October 12

Saint Domnina (Greek: Δομνίνα) is venerated as a Christian martyr by the Roman Catholic and Eastern Orthodox churches. According to tradition, she was a native of Cilicia who was imprisoned at Anazarbus and repeatedly beaten on the order of the Roman prefect Lysias (or Licius). She was then burned with fire. She died in prison.

According to one source, “The Roman Martyrologist must have used a corrupt manuscript in which Lycia was substituted for Lysias, as he places St. Domnina’s martyrdom in the Province of that name.”
