= Anastasia the Roman =

Ancient Roman nun and martyr

Saint Anastasia the Roman
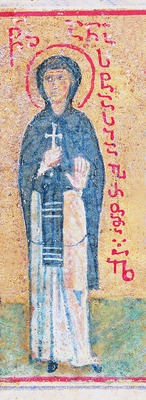
- Anastasia of Rome (III c)
- Died: c. 250; Rome
- Venerated in: Eastern Orthodox Church
- Feast: 29 October

Anastasia the Roman (Greek: Αγία Αναστασία η Ρωμαία, died c. 250) was 3rd-century Christian saint and nun who was martyred during the reign of Roman emperor Decius.

Anastasia was orphaned at the age of three and was raised in a convent, where she became renowned for her asceticism. During the persecutions under the Emperor Decius, she was apprehended, tortured, and beheaded by a city administrator named Probus. Her feast day is celebrated on 29 October.

This St. Anastasia should not be confused with another St. Anastasia of Rome who was martyred with St. Basilissa in 68 AD.

== See also ==
- List of saints named Anastasia

== Bibliography ==
- Orthodox Wiki
