= Peter Apselamus =

3rd-century Christian martyr

Saint Peter the Standard Bearer
- Martyr Peter the Standard Bearer of Eleutheropolis in Palestine. (Menologion of Basil II, 10th century).

Martyr
- Died: 11 January 309 or 311; Hebron, Palestine, Roman Empire
- Honored in: Eastern Orthodox Church, Roman Catholic Church
- Feast: October 14 (Orthodox), January 13 (Catholic)

Peter Abselamus (also known as Peter Absalon, Peter Balsamus, and Peter of Atroa), also called "the Standard Bearer", was a third-century Christian martyr. He was born in Anea, near Eleutheropolis and was known for his physical strength, charity and piety.

There is substantial disagreement regarding his death in 311 AD. The account in his Acta Sanctorum indicate that he was tortured and killed at Aulana, near Hebron, and later crucified. Another account, in Eusebius of Caesarea's History of the Martyrs in Palestine, indicates he was burned alive in Caesarea; yet another account gives a date of the 11th of January 309.

Louis-Sébastien Le Nain de Tillemont has stated that two different people are mentioned in the accounts. He stated that Peter Abselamus was crucified at Aulana, and that a different person, Peter Absalon, was burned at Caesarea.

The martyr at Aulana is commemorated as a saint, with a feast day of January 3.

The martyr at Caesarea's feast day is January 13. The Greek liturgy has his feast day on October 14, and is the only Palestinian martyr from the persecution of Diocletian, who has his name in the Jerusalem calendar.
