= Sant'Antonin, Venice =

Church in Venice, Italy

Sant'Antonin
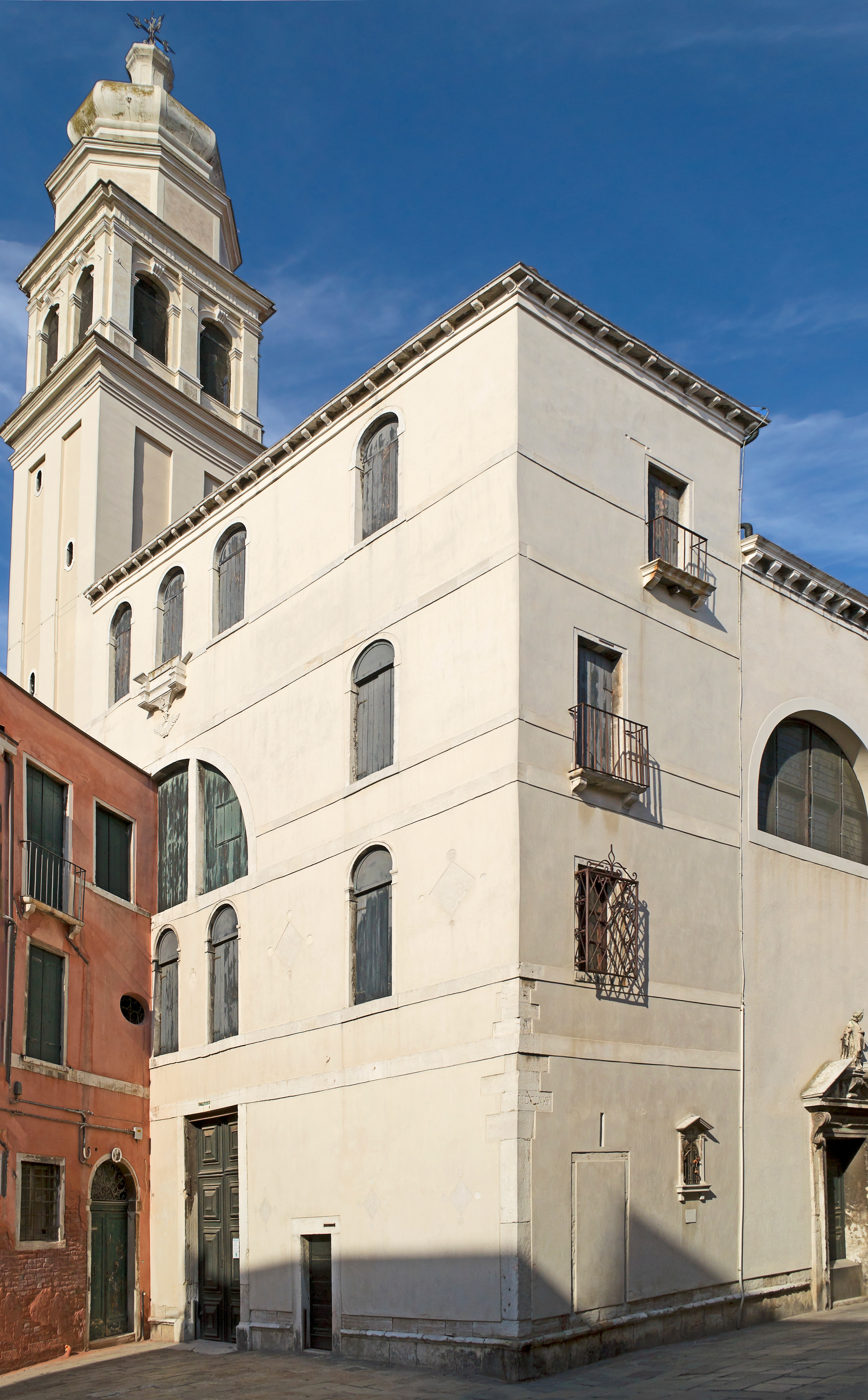
- Church and bell-tower

- Location within Venice Location within Italy

Religion
- Affiliation: Roman Catholic
- Province: Venice

Location
- Location: Venice, Italy
- Interactive map of Sant'Antonin
- Coordinates: 45°26′08″N 12°20′48″E

Architecture
- Completed: 12th century

Sant'Antonin is a church in the sestiere of Castello in Venice, Italy.

== History ==
The church was initially founded by the patrician Badoer family in the seventh century. It was reconstructed in the 12th century, and again in 1680, under designs of Baldassare Longhena. The bell-tower was added in 1750. The chapel on the left, dedicated to St Saba, was frescoed by Alessandro Vittoria on the walls, and in the ceiling by Sebastiano Ricci with Saints Saba and Antonin. The Chapel’s altarpiece by Lazzaro Bastiani depicts a Deposition. It derives originally from the church of San Severo.

The Tiepolo family commissioned the decoration of another chapel, with works by Palma il Giovane depicting the life of San Saba. The chapel is said to contain his remains brought here from Acre by Lorenzo Tiepolo during the 13th century War of Saint Sabas. The chapel also has a bust of Alvise Tiepolo by Alessandro Vittoria.

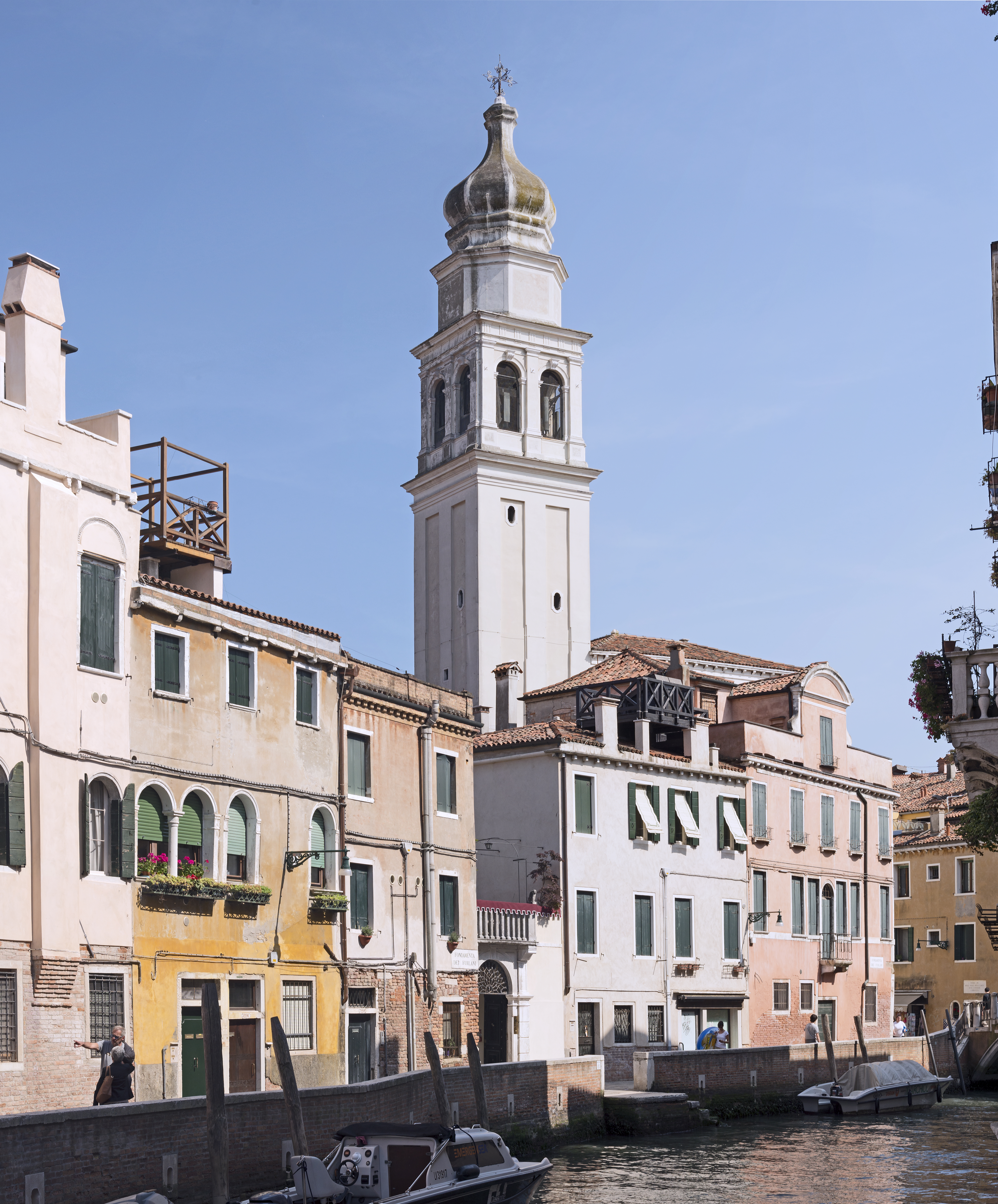
Campanile

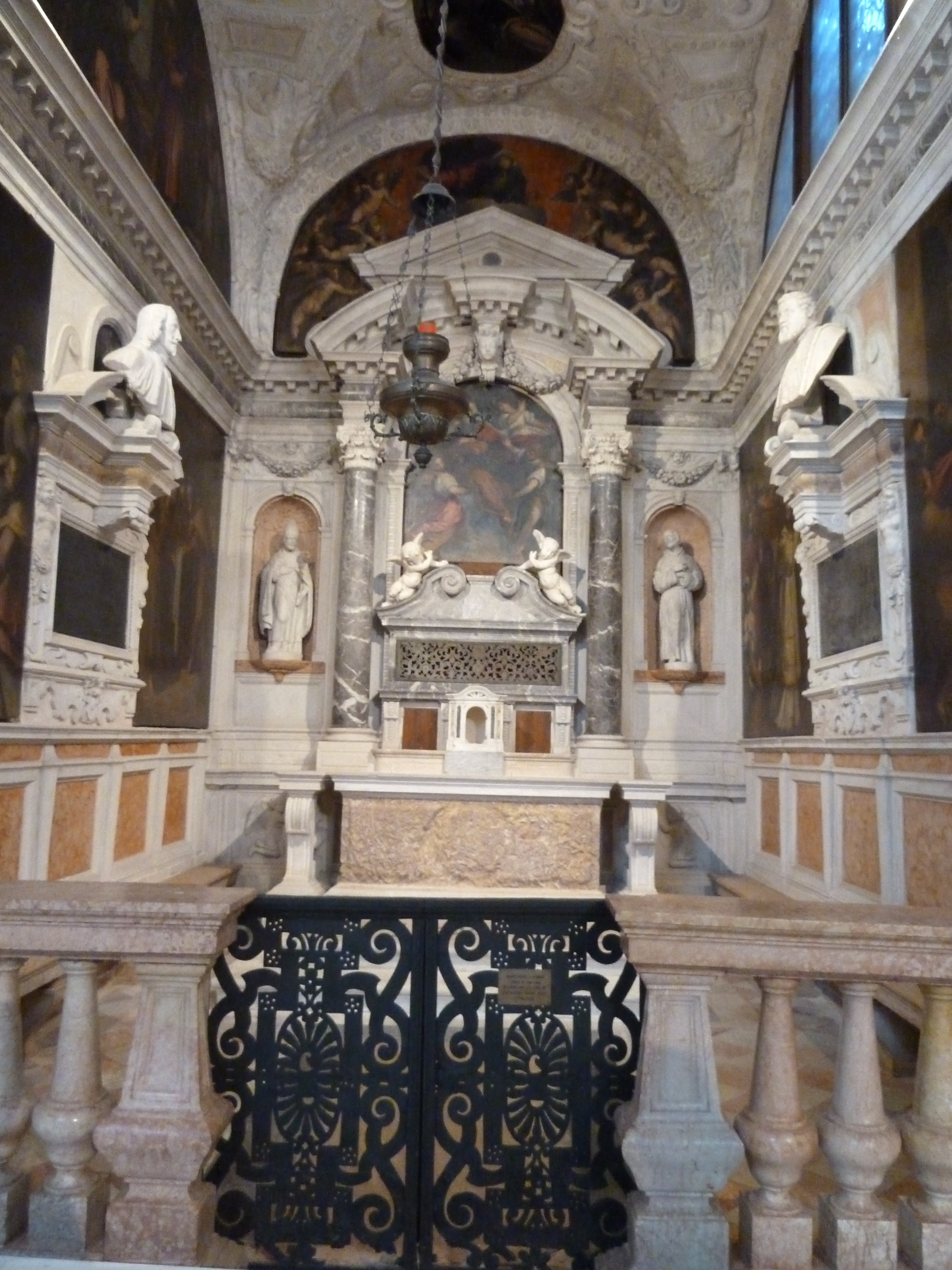
Interior

== Bibliography ==
- Marcello Brusegan, Le chiese di Venezia, Newton Compton, 2008. ISBN 88-541-0819-7.
