= December 30 =

December 30 this year in various calendars
- Wednesday, 30 December 2026
Akan	Monowukuo
Armenian	13 Arach 1476
Aztec	Huei Tozoztli 9, 4 Ehēcatl
Babylonian	20 Kislimu, 2337 SE
Balinese pawukon	Menga, Kajeng, Menala, Umanis, Maulu, Buda of Julungwangi, Yama, Gigis, Suka
Bengali	15 Poush, BS 1433
Chinese	Yang Earth Tiger・Three Stars Mansion; Fire Horse Year, Month 11, Day 22 (Dongzhi, 6 days until Xiaohan)
Common Era	30 December 2026 CE
Coptic	21 Koiak, AM 1743
Egyptian	18 Pachon, 2775 NE
Ethiopian	21 Tākḫśāś, 2019 Amätä Məhrät
French Republican	Décade I, Nonidi de Nivôse de l'Année 235 de la République
Gregorian	30 December, AD 2026
Hebrew	20 Tevet, AM 5787
Hindu	Uttaraphalgunī・Saubhāgya; Solar: 15 Pauṣa, 1948 SE; Lunisolar: Saptamī, Kṛishna pakṣa of Mārgaśīrṣa, 2083 VE; Rāudra・5127 KY・1,872,939
Icelandic	Miðvikudagur, 8 Mörsugur 2026
Islamic	20 Rajab, AH 1448 (using tabular method)
ISO week date	2026-W53-3
Japanese	22 Shimotsuki, Reiwa 8 (Tōji, 6 days until Shōkan)
Julian	17 December, AD 2026 (AM 7535)
Julian day	2461405
Korean	22 Jwidal, 4359 DE
Maya	13.0.14.4.2; 15 Kankin, 4 Ik
Roman	ante diem XVI Kalendas Ianuarias, MMDCCLXXX AUC
Solar Hijri	9 Dey, SH 1405
Tibetan	22 mgo, me pho rta 2153 or 1772 or 1000

<<	December					>>
Su	Mo	Tu	We	Th	Fr	Sa
		1	2	3	4	5
6	7	8	9	10	11	12
13	14	15	16	17	18	19
20	21	22	23	24	25	26
27	28	29	30	31
2026

December 30 in recent years
2025 (Tuesday)
2024 (Monday)
2023 (Saturday)
2022 (Friday)
2021 (Thursday)
2020 (Wednesday)
2019 (Monday)
2018 (Sunday)
2017 (Saturday)
2016 (Friday)

December 30 is the 364th day of the year (365th in leap years) in the Gregorian calendar; one day remains until the end of the year.

== Events ==
=== Pre-1600 ===
- 534 – The second and final edition of the Code of Justinian comes into effect in the Byzantine Empire.
- 999 – Battle of Glenmama: The combined forces of Munster and Meath under king Brian Boru inflict a crushing defeat on the allied armies of Leinster and Dublin near Lyons Hill in Ireland.
- 1066 – Granada massacre: A Muslim mob storms the royal palace in Granada, crucifies Jewish vizier Joseph ibn Naghrela and massacres most of the Jewish population of the city.
- 1419 – Hundred Years' War: Battle of La Rochelle.
- 1460 – Wars of the Roses: Lancastrians kill the 3rd Duke of York and win the Battle of Wakefield.

=== 1601–1900 ===
- 1641 – Reapers' War: Louis XIII of France swears the Catalan constitutions, being appointed Count of Barcelona and thus establishing the personal union of the Principality of Catalonia with the Kingdom of France.
- 1702 – Queen Anne's War: James Moore, Governor of the Province of Carolina, abandons the Siege of St. Augustine.
- 1813 – War of 1812: British soldiers burn Buffalo, New York.
- 1816 – The Treaty of St. Louis between the United States and the united Ottawa, Ojibwa, and Potawatomi Indian tribes is proclaimed.
- 1825 – The Treaty of St. Louis between the United States and the Shawnee Nation is proclaimed.
- 1853 – Gadsden Purchase: The United States buys land from Mexico to facilitate railroad building in the Southwest.
- 1890 – Following the Wounded Knee Massacre, the United States Army and Lakota warriors face off in the Drexel Mission Fight.
- 1896 – Filipino patriot and reform advocate José Rizal is executed by a Spanish firing squad in Manila.
- 1896 – Canadian ice hockey player Ernie McLea scores the first hat-trick in Stanley Cup play, and the Cup-winning goal as the Montreal Victorias defeat the Winnipeg Victorias 6–5.
- 1897 – The British Colony of Natal annexes Zululand.

=== 1901–present ===
- 1902 – The Discovery Expedition under Robert Falcon Scott attains a Farthest South at 82°17′S in Antarctica.
- 1903 – A fire at the Iroquois Theater in Chicago, Illinois kills at least 605.
- 1905 – Former Idaho governor Frank Steunenberg is assassinated at the front gate of his home in Caldwell.
- 1906 – The All-India Muslim League is founded in Dacca, East Bengal, British India (later Dhaka, Bangladesh).
- 1916 – Russian mystic and advisor to the Tsar Grigori Yefimovich Rasputin is murdered by a loyalist group led by Prince Felix Yusupov. His frozen, partially-trussed body was discovered in a Petrograd river three days later.
- 1916 – The last coronation in Hungary is performed for King Charles IV and Queen Zita.
- 1922 – The Union of Soviet Socialist Republics (USSR) is formed.
- 1927 – The Ginza Line, the first subway line in Asia, opens in Tokyo, Japan.
- 1935 – The Italian Air Force bombs a Swedish Red Cross hospital during the Second Italo-Abyssinian War.
- 1936 – The Flint sit-down strike hits General Motors.
- 1943 – Subhas Chandra Bose raises the flag of Indian independence at Port Blair.
- 1944 – King George II of Greece declares a regency, leaving the throne vacant.
- 1947 – Cold War: King Michael I of Romania is forced to abdicate by the Soviet Union-backed Communist government of Romania.
- 1952 – An RAF Avro Lancaster bomber crashes in Luqa, Malta after an engine failure, killing three crew members and a civilian on the ground.
- 1954 – The Finnish National Bureau of Investigation is established to consolidate criminal investigation and intelligence into a single agency.
- 1958 – The Guatemalan Air Force sinks several Mexican fishing boats alleged to have breached maritime borders, killing three and sparking international tension.
- 1967 – Aeroflot Flight L-51 crashes near Liepāja International Airport in Liepāja, Latvia, killing 43.
- 1970 – Hurricane Creek mine disaster, near Hyden, Kentucky
- 1972 – Vietnam War: Operation Linebacker II ends.
- 1987 – Stella Sigcau, Prime minister of the South African Bantustan of Transkei, is ousted from power in a bloodless military coup led by General Bantu Holomisa.
- 1993 – Israel establishes diplomatic relations with Vatican City and also upgrades to full diplomatic relations with Ireland.
- 1996 – Proposed budget cuts by Benjamin Netanyahu spark protests from 250,000 workers who shut down services across Israel.
- 1997 – In the worst incident in Algeria's insurgency, the Wilaya of Relizane massacres, 400 people from four villages are killed.
- 2000 – Rizal Day bombings: A series of bombs explode in various places in Metro Manila, Philippines within a period of a few hours, killing 22 and injuring about a hundred.
- 2004 – A fire in the República Cromagnon nightclub in Buenos Aires, Argentina, kills 194.
- 2005 – Tropical Storm Zeta forms in the open Atlantic Ocean, tying the record for the latest tropical cyclone ever to form in the North Atlantic basin.
- 2006 – Madrid–Barajas Airport is bombed.
- 2006 – The Indonesian passenger ferry MV Senopati Nusantara sinks in a storm, resulting in at least 400 deaths.
- 2006 – Former president of Iraq Saddam Hussein is executed.
- 2009 – A segment of the Lanzhou–Zhengzhou–Changsha pipeline ruptures in Shaanxi, China, and approximately 150,000 L (40,000 US gal) of diesel oil flows down the Wei River before finally reaching the Yellow River.
- 2009 – A suicide bomber kills nine people at Forward Operating Base Chapman, a key facility of the Central Intelligence Agency in Afghanistan.
- 2013 – More than 100 people are killed when anti-government forces attack key buildings in Kinshasa, Democratic Republic of the Congo.
- 2020 – A large explosion at the airport in the southern Yemeni city of Aden kills at least 22 people and wounds 50.

== Births ==
=== Pre–1600 ===
- AD 39 – Titus, Roman emperor (probable) (died 81)
- 159 – Empress Dowager Bian, second wife of Cao Cao, mother of Cao Wei's first emperor, Cao Pi (died 230)
- 1204 – Abû 'Uthmân Sa'îd ibn Hakam al Qurashi, ruler of Minorca (died 1282)
- 1371 – Vasily I of Moscow (died 1425)
- 1490 – Ebussuud Efendi, Ottoman lawyer and jurist (died 1574)
- 1548 – David Pareus, German theologian (died 1622)
- 1578 – Ulrik of Denmark, Danish prince-bishop (died 1624)

=== 1601–1900 ===
- 1642 – Vincenzo da Filicaja, Italian poet (died 1707)
- 1673 – Ahmed III, Ottoman sultan (died 1736)
- 1678 – William Croft, English organist and composer (died 1727)
- 1722 – Charles Yorke, English lawyer and politician, Lord Chancellor of Great Britain (died 1770)
- 1724 – Louis-Jean-François Lagrenée, French painter and educator (died 1805)
- 1757 – Sebastián Kindelán y O'Regan, colonial governor of East Florida, Santo Domingo and Cuba (died 1826)
- 1760 – Charles Sapinaud de La Rairie, French general (died 1829)
- 1792 – Sylvester Jordan, German lawyer and politician (died 1861)
- 1819 – Theodor Fontane, German author and poet (died 1898)
- 1819 – John W. Geary, American lawyer and politician, 16th Governor of Pennsylvania (died 1873)
- 1825 – Samuel Newitt Wood, American lawyer and politician (died 1891)
- 1842 – Osman Hamdi Bey, Ottoman administrator, intellectual, art expert and painter (died 1910)
- 1849 – John Milne, English seismologist and geologist (died 1913)
- 1851 – Asa Griggs Candler, American businessman and politician, 44th Mayor of Atlanta (died 1929)
- 1853 – André Messager, French pianist, composer, and conductor (died 1929)
- 1857 – Sylvio Lazzari, French-Austrian composer (died 1944)
- 1865 – Rudyard Kipling, Indian-English author and poet, Nobel Prize laureate (died 1936)
- 1869 – Stephen Leacock, English-Canadian political scientist and author (died 1944)
- 1869 – Ōzutsu Man'emon, Japanese sumo wrestler, the 18th Yokozuna (died 1918)
- 1873 – Al Smith, American lawyer and politician, 42nd Governor of New York (died 1944)
- 1878 – William Aberhart, Canadian evangelist and politician, seventh Premier of Alberta (died 1943)
- 1879 – Ramana Maharshi, Indian guru and philosopher (died 1950)
- 1883 – Archer Baldwin, American-English farmer and politician (died 1966)
- 1883 – Lester Patrick, Canadian ice hockey player and coach (died 1960)
- 1884 – Hideki Tōjō, Japanese general and politician, 40th Prime Minister of Japan (died 1948)
- 1886 – Austin Osman Spare, English artist and occultist (died 1956)
- 1887 – William Kolehmainen, Finnish-American runner and coach (died 1967)
- 1887 – K. M. Munshi, Indian politician, writer and educationist, founder of Bharatiya Vidya Bhavan (died 1971)
- 1890 – Adolfo Ruiz Cortines, Mexican soldier and politician, 47th President of Mexico (died 1973)
- 1897 – Alfredo Bracchi, Italian songwriter and screenwriter (died 1976)
- 1899 – Helge Ingstad, Norwegian explorer, lawyer, and politician, 2nd Governor of Svalbard (died 2001)

=== 1901–present ===
- 1904 – Dmitry Kabalevsky, Russian composer and academic (died 1987)
- 1905 – Daniil Kharms, Russian poet, author, and playwright (died 1942)
- 1906 – Alziro Bergonzo, Italian architect and painter (died 1997)
- 1906 – Carol Reed, English director and producer (died 1976)
- 1910 – Paul Bowles, American composer and author (died 1999)
- 1911 – Jeanette Nolan, American actress (died 1998)
- 1913 – Lucio Agostini, Italian-Canadian conductor and composer (died 1996)
- 1913 – Elyne Mitchell, Australian author (died 2002)
- 1914 – Bert Parks, American actor, singer, television personality, and beauty pageant host (died 1992)
- 1917 – Seymour Melman, American engineer and author (died 2004)
- 1919 – Dick Spooner, English cricketer (died 1997)
- 1919 – David Willcocks, English organist, composer, and conductor (died 2015)
- 1921 – Rashid Karami, Lebanese lawyer and politician, 32nd Prime Minister of Lebanon (died 1987)
- 1922 – Jane Langton, American author and illustrator (died 2018)
- 1923 – Prakash Vir Shastri, Indian academic and politician (died 1977)
- 1924 – Yvonne Brill, Canadian-American propulsion engineer (died 2013)
- 1925 – Ian MacNaughton, Scottish actor, producer, and director (died 2002)
- 1926 – Stan Tracey, English pianist and composer (died 2013)
- 1927 – Jan Kubíček, Czech painter and sculptor (died 2013)
- 1928 – Bo Diddley, American singer-songwriter and guitarist (died 2008)
- 1929 – Rosalinde Hurley, English physician, microbiologist, and academic (died 2004)
- 1930 – Roy Yorke Calne, English surgeon and academic (died 2024)
- 1930 – Elmira Minita Gordon, Belizean educator, 1st Governor-General of Belize (died 2021)
- 1930 – Red Rhodes, American pedal steel guitarist (died 1995)
- 1930 – Tu Youyou, Chinese chemist and pharmacist, Nobel Prize laureate
- 1931 – Skeeter Davis, American singer-songwriter (died 2004)
- 1931 – John T. Houghton, Welsh physicist and author (died 2020)
- 1931 – Frank Torre, American baseball player and manager (died 2014)
- 1933 – Timité Bassori, Ivorian filmmaker, actor, and writer
- 1934 – John N. Bahcall, American astrophysicist and astronomer, co-developed the Hubble Space Telescope (died 2005)
- 1934 – Joseph Bologna, American actor, director, playwright and screenwriter (died 2017)
- 1934 – Barry Briggs, New Zealand motorcycle racer and sportscaster
- 1934 – Joseph P. Hoar, American general (died 2022)
- 1934 – Tony Serra, American criminal defense and civil rights attorney, political activist and tax resister
- 1934 – Del Shannon, American singer-songwriter and guitarist (died 1990)
- 1934 – Russ Tamblyn, American actor
- 1935 – Omar Bongo, Gabonese lieutenant and politician, President of Gabon (died 2009)
- 1935 – Sandy Koufax, American baseball player and sportscaster
- 1935 – Jack Riley, American actor (died 2016)
- 1937 – Gordon Banks, English footballer and manager (died 2019)
- 1937 – John Hartford, American singer-songwriter and fiddler (died 2001)
- 1937 – Jim Marshall, American football player (died 2025)
- 1937 – Paul Stookey, American singer-songwriter and guitarist
- 1938 – Ron Wolf, American Football Hall of Fame General Manager
- 1939 – Glenda Adams, Australian author and academic (died 2007)
- 1939 – Felix Pappalardi, American singer-songwriter, bass player, and producer (died 1983)
- 1940 – James Burrows, American actor, director, producer, and screenwriter (died 2026)
- 1941 – Mel Renfro, American football player and coach
- 1942 – Vladimir Bukovsky, Russian author and activist (died 2019)
- 1942 – Guy Edwards, English race car driver
- 1942 – Michael Nesmith, American singer-songwriter, guitarist, and actor (died 2021)
- 1942 – Janko Prunk, Slovenian historian, academic, and politician
- 1942 – Robert Quine, American guitarist (died 2004)
- 1942 – Toomas Savi, Estonian physician and politician
- 1942 – Fred Ward, American actor (died 2022)
- 1944 – William J. Fallon, American admiral
- 1944 – Joseph Hilbe, American mathematician and philosopher (died 2017)
- 1945 – Davy Jones, English singer-songwriter and actor (died 2012)
- 1945 – Lloyd Kaufman, American director, producer, and screenwriter, co-founded Troma Entertainment
- 1945 – Paola Pigni, Italian runner (died 2021)
- 1945 – Concetta Tomei, American actress
- 1946 – Clive Bunker, English drummer and songwriter
- 1946 – Patti Smith, American singer-songwriter and poet
- 1946 – Berti Vogts, German footballer and coach
- 1947 – James Kahn, American author, screenwriter, and producer
- 1947 – Jeff Lynne, English singer-songwriter, guitarist, and producer
- 1947 – Steve Mix, American basketball player and coach
- 1948 – Jed Johnson, American interior designer and director (died 1996)
- 1949 – David Bedford, English runner
- 1949 – Jerry Coyne, American biologist and author
- 1949 – Jim Flaherty, Canadian lawyer and politician, 37th Canadian Minister of Finance (died 2014)
- 1950 – Timothy Mo, Chinese-English author
- 1950 – Lewis Shiner, American journalist and author
- 1950 – Bjarne Stroustrup, Danish computer scientist, created the C++ programming language
- 1950 – Martti Vainio, Finnish runner
- 1951 – Doug Allder, English footballer and coach
- 1951 – Chris Jasper, American musician, singer-songwriter, and producer (died 2025)
- 1951 – Nick Rose, English runner
- 1952 – June Anderson, American soprano and actress
- 1953 – Daniel T. Barry, American engineer and astronaut
- 1953 – Dana Key, American singer, guitarist, and producer (died 2010)
- 1953 – Graham Vick, English director and producer (died 2021)
- 1953 – Meredith Vieira, American journalist and game show host
- 1954 – Barry Greenstein, American poker player and philanthropist
- 1956 – Ingus Baušķenieks, Latvian singer-songwriter and producer
- 1956 – Suzy Bogguss, American country singer-songwriter and guitarist
- 1956 – Patricia Kalember, American actress
- 1956 – Sheryl Lee Ralph, American actress and singer
- 1957 – Matt Lauer, American journalist and television host
- 1957 – Glenn Robbins, Australian comedian and actor
- 1958 – Pedro Costa, Portuguese director, screenwriter, and cinematographer
- 1958 – Steven Smith, American engineer and astronaut
- 1959 – Antonio Pappano, English pianist and conductor
- 1959 – Kåre Thomsen, Norwegian guitarist and graphic designer
- 1959 – Tracey Ullman, English-American actress, singer, director, and screenwriter
- 1959 – Josée Verner, Canadian politician, 8th Canadian Minister of Intergovernmental Affairs
- 1960 – Richard M. Durbin, English biologist and academic
- 1961 – Douglas Coupland, German-Canadian author and playwright
- 1961 – Bill English, New Zealand farmer and politician, 39th Prime Minister of New Zealand
- 1961 – Sean Hannity, American radio and television host
- 1961 – Ben Johnson, Jamaican-Canadian sprinter
- 1961 – Charlie Nicholas, Scottish footballer and sportscaster
- 1963 – Chandler Burr, American journalist and author
- 1963 – Mike Pompeo, American diplomat and politician; 70th United States Secretary of State
- 1963 – Johnny Rogers, American-Spanish basketball player
- 1963 – Milan Šrejber, Czech tennis player
- 1964 – Almir Kayumov, Russian footballer and referee (died 2013)
- 1964 – Sylvie Moreau, Canadian actress and screenwriter
- 1964 – George Newbern, American actor
- 1965 – Heidi Fleiss, American procurer
- 1966 – Gary Chartier, American philosopher, scholar, and academic
- 1966 – Bennett Miller, American director and producer
- 1967 – Carl Ouellet, Canadian wrestler and sportscaster
- 1968 – Bryan Burk, American screenwriter and producer
- 1968 – Adam Dale, Australian cricketer
- 1968 – Sandra Glover, American hurdler
- 1968 – Albano Mucci, Australian activist
- 1969 – Emmanuel Clérico, French race car driver
- 1969 – Dave England, American snowboarder and stuntman
- 1969 – Jay Kay, English singer and songwriter
- 1969 – Kersti Kaljulaid, President of Estonia
- 1969 – Michelle McGann, American golfer
- 1969 – Meredith Monroe, American actress
- 1971 – Sister Bliss, English keyboard player, songwriter, and producer
- 1971 – C. S. Lee, Korean-American actor
- 1971 – Ricardo, Spanish footballer and manager
- 1971 – Daniel Sunjata, American actor
- 1972 – Daniel Amokachi, Nigerian footballer and manager
- 1972 – Maureen Flannigan, American actress and producer
- 1972 – Paul Keegan, Irish footballer
- 1972 – Dita Indah Sari, Indonesian trade union leader and activist
- 1973 – Jason Behr, American actor
- 1973 – Ato Boldon, Trinidadian runner, sportscaster, and politician
- 1974 – Alexandro Alves do Nascimento, Brazilian footballer (died 2012)
- 1974 – Dr. Jitheshji, Indian Speed Cartoonist and Pictorial Orator
- 1975 – Scott Chipperfield, Australian footballer
- 1975 – Tiger Woods, American golfer
- 1976 – Kastro, American rapper
- 1976 – Patrick Kerney, American football player
- 1976 – A. J. Pierzynski, American baseball player and sportscaster
- 1977 – Laila Ali, American boxer and actress
- 1977 – Glory Alozie, Nigerian-Spanish sprinter and hurdler
- 1977 – Grant Balfour, Australian baseball player
- 1977 – Saša Ilić, Serbian footballer and manager
- 1977 – Kenyon Martin, American basketball player
- 1977 – Lucy Punch, English actress
- 1977 – Kazuyuki Toda, Japanese footballer
- 1978 – Devin Brown, American basketball player
- 1978 – Tyrese Gibson, American singer-songwriter, producer, and actor
- 1978 – Phillips Idowu, English triple jumper
- 1978 – Zbigniew Robert Promiński, Polish drummer
- 1978 – Rob Scuderi, American ice hockey player
- 1979 – Michael Grimm, American singer-songwriter and guitarist
- 1980 – Eliza Dushku, American former actress and producer
- 1980 – D. J. Mbenga, Congolese-Belgian basketball player
- 1980 – Alison McGovern, British politician
- 1981 – Ali Al-Habsi, Omani footballer
- 1981 – Cédric Carrasso, French footballer
- 1981 – Michael Rodríguez, Costa Rican footballer
- 1981 – Matt Ulrich, American football player
- 1982 – Kristin Kreuk, Canadian actress
- 1982 – Tobias Kurbjuweit, German footballer
- 1982 – Dawan Landry, American football player
- 1983 – Eddie Edwards, American professional wrestler
- 1983 – Nick Symmonds, American runner
- 1983 – Kevin Systrom, American computer programmer and businessman, co-founded Instagram
- 1984 – Randall Azofeifa, Costa Rican footballer
- 1984 – Andra Day, American singer and songwriter
- 1984 – LeBron James, American basketball player, producer and businessman
- 1985 – Lars Boom, Dutch cyclist
- 1985 – Bryson Goodwin, Australian rugby league player
- 1985 – Anna Wood, American actress
- 1986 – Domenico Criscito, Italian footballer
- 1986 – Ellie Goulding, English singer-songwriter and producer
- 1986 – Caity Lotz, American actress
- 1986 – Jeff Ward, American actor
- 1986 – Gianni Zuiverloon, Dutch footballer
- 1987 – Jakub Nakládal, Czech ice hockey player
- 1989 – Tyler Anderson, American baseball player
- 1989 – Ryan Sheckler, American skateboarder and entrepreneur
- 1989 – Kateřina Vaňková, Czech tennis player
- 1990 – Bruno Henrique, Brazilian footballer
- 1990 – Joe Root, English cricketer
- 1990 – C. J. Wilcox, American basketball player
- 1991 – Camila Giorgi, Italian tennis player
- 1992 – Ryan Tunnicliffe, English footballer
- 1992 – Carson Wentz, American football player
- 1995 – Igor Shesterkin, Russian hockey goaltender
- 1995 – Joshua, American singer
- 1995 – Ollie Watkins, English footballer
- 1995 – V, South Korean singer

== Deaths ==
=== Pre-1600 ===
- 274 – Pope Felix I
- 717 – Egwin of Evesham, bishop of Worcester
- 903 – Tian Jun, Chinese warlord (born 858)
- 925 – Wang Shenzhi, founder of Min (born 862)
- 1115 – Theodoric II, Duke of Lorraine
- 1331 – Bernard Gui, inquisitor (born 1261 or 1262)
- 1435 – Bonne of Berry, Regent of Savoy (born 1362)
- 1436 – Louis III, Elector Palatine (born 1378)
- 1460 – Edmund, Earl of Rutland, Irish politician, Lord Chancellor of Ireland (born 1443)
- 1460 – Richard of York, 3rd Duke of York (born 1411)
- 1525 – Jakob Fugger, German banker and businessman (born 1459)
- 1572 – Galeazzo Alessi, Italian architect, designed the Basilica of Santa Maria degli Angeli (born 1512)
- 1573 – Giovanni Battista Giraldi, Italian author and poet (born 1504)
- 1591 – Pope Innocent IX (born 1519)

=== 1601–1900 ===
- 1606 – Heinrich Bünting, German priest and cartographer (born 1545)
- 1621 – Job of Manyava, Ukrainian monk and saint (born 1550)
- 1640 – John Francis Regis, French priest and saint (born 1597)
- 1643 – Giovanni Baglione, Italian painter and historian of art (born 1566)
- 1644 – Jan Baptist van Helmont, Flemish chemist, physiologist, and physician (born 1577)
- 1662 – Ferdinand Charles, Archduke of Austria (born 1628)
- 1769 – Nicholas Taaffe, 6th Viscount Taaffe, Irish-Austrian soldier and courtier (born 1685)
- 1777 – Maximilian III Joseph, Elector of Bavaria (born 1727)
- 1788 – Francesco Zuccarelli, Italian painter and academic (born 1702)
- 1803 – Francis Lewis, Welsh-American merchant and politician (born 1713)
- 1879 – Manuel de Araújo Porto-Alegre, Baron of Santo Ângelo, Brazilian poet and painter (born 1806)
- 1885 – Martha Darley Mutrie, British painter (born 1824)
- 1896 – José Rizal, Filipino ophthalmologist, journalist, and author (born 1861)

=== 1901–present ===
- 1906 – Josephine Butler, English feminist and social reformer (born 1828)
- 1908 – Thomas-Alfred Bernier, Canadian journalist, lawyer, and politician (born 1844)
- 1916 – Grigori Rasputin, Russian mystic (born 1869)
- 1928 – Jean Collas, French rugby player and tug of war competitor (born 1874)
- 1937 – Hans Niels Andersen, Danish businessman, founded the East Asiatic Company (born 1852)
- 1940 – Childe Wills, American engineer (born 1878)
- 1941 – El Lissitzky, Russian photographer and architect (born 1890)
- 1944 – Romain Rolland, French author and playwright, Nobel Prize laureate (born 1866)
- 1945 – Song Jin-woo, South Korean journalist and politician (born 1889)
- 1947 – Han van Meegeren, Dutch painter (born 1889)
- 1947 – Alfred North Whitehead, English-American mathematician and philosopher (born 1861)
- 1954 – Archduke Eugen of Austria (born 1863)
- 1955 – Rex Ingamells, Australian poet and author (born 1913)
- 1967 – Vincent Massey, Canadian lawyer and politician, 18th Governor General of Canada (born 1887)
- 1968 – Trygve Lie, Norwegian journalist and politician, first Secretary-General of the United Nations (born 1896)
- 1970 – Sonny Liston, American boxer (born 1932)
- 1971 – Jo Cals, Dutch lawyer and politician, Prime Minister of the Netherlands (born 1914)
- 1971 – Vikram Sarabhai, Indian physicist and academic (born 1919)
- 1979 – Richard Rodgers, American playwright and composer (born 1902)
- 1982 – Alberto Vargas, Peruvian-American painter and illustrator (born 1896)
- 1983 – Violette Cordery, English race car driver (born 1900)
- 1986 – Era Bell Thompson, American journalist (born 1905)
- 1988 – Yuli Daniel, Russian author and poet (born 1925)
- 1988 – Isamu Noguchi, American sculptor and landscaper (born 1904)
- 1990 – Raghuvir Sahay, Indian author, poet, and critic (born 1929)
- 1992 – Romeo Muller, American actor, screenwriter, for screenplays like the 1964, Rudolph the Red-Nosed Reindeer (TV special) (born 1928)
- 1993 – İhsan Sabri Çağlayangil, Turkish lawyer and politician, 20th Turkish Minister of Foreign Affairs (born 1908)
- 1993 – Irving "Swifty" Lazar, American talent agent (born 1907)
- 1993 – Giuseppe Occhialini, Italian-French physicist and academic (born 1907)
- 1994 – Dmitri Ivanenko, Ukrainian-Russian physicist and academic (born 1904)
- 1995 – Ralph Flanagan, American pianist, composer, and conductor (born 1914)
- 1995 – Doris Grau, American voice actor and script supervisor (born 1924)
- 1996 – Lew Ayres, American actor (born 1908)
- 1997 – Shinichi Hoshi, Japanese author and illustrator (born 1926)
- 1998 – Sam Muchnick, American wrestling promoter, co-founded the National Wrestling Alliance (born 1905)
- 1999 – Joff Ellen, Australian comedian and actor (born 1915)
- 1999 – Fritz Leonhardt, German engineer, co-designed the Cologne Rodenkirchen Bridge and Fernsehturm Stuttgart (born 1909)
- 1999 – Des Renford, Australian swimmer (born 1927)
- 1999 – Sarah Knauss, American supercentenarian (born 1880)
- 2000 – Julius J. Epstein, American screenwriter and producer (born 1909)
- 2002 – Mary Brian, American actress (born 1906)
- 2002 – Eleanor J. Gibson, American psychologist and academic (born 1910)
- 2002 – Mary Wesley, English author (born 1912)
- 2003 – John Gregory Dunne, American novelist, screenwriter, and critic (born 1932)
- 2004 – Artie Shaw, American clarinet player, composer, and bandleader (born 1910)
- 2005 – Eddie Barlow, South African cricketer and coach (born 1940)
- 2005 – Rona Jaffe, American novelist (born 1932)
- 2006 – Saddam Hussein, Iraqi general and politician, fifth President of Iraq (born 1937)
- 2006 – Terry Peck, Falkland Islander police officer and spy (born 1938)
- 2006 – Michel Plasse, Canadian ice hockey player (born 1948)
- 2009 – Rowland S. Howard, Australian singer-songwriter and guitarist (born 1959)
- 2009 – Abdurrahman Wahid, Indonesian journalist and politician, fourth President of Indonesia (born 1940)
- 2010 – Bobby Farrell, Dutch dancer and performer from Aruba (born 1949)
- 2011 – Ronald Searle, English-French cartoonist (born 1920)
- 2012 – Philip Coppens, Belgian-American journalist and author (born 1971)
- 2012 – Beate Sirota Gordon, Austrian-American director and producer (born 1923)
- 2012 – Rita Levi-Montalcini, Italian neurologist and academic, Nobel Prize laureate (born 1909)
- 2012 – Carl Woese, American microbiologist and biophysicist (born 1928)
- 2012 – Dennis Ferguson, Australian sex offender (born 1948)
- 2013 – Kinnaird R. McKee, American admiral (born 1929)
- 2013 – José María Maguregui, Spanish footballer and manager (born 1934)
- 2013 – Eiichi Ohtaki, Japanese singer-songwriter and producer (born 1948)
- 2013 – Johnny Orr, American basketball player and coach (born 1927)
- 2013 – Paul Sally, American mathematician and academic (born 1933)
- 2014 – Terry Becker, American actor, director, and producer (born 1921)
- 2014 – Jim Galloway, Scottish-Canadian clarinet player and saxophonist (born 1936)
- 2014 – Luise Rainer, German-born American-British actress (born 1910)
- 2015 – Doug Atkins, American football player (born 1930)
- 2015 – Howard Davis, Jr., American boxer and trainer (born 1956)
- 2015 – Mangesh Padgaonkar, Indian poet, playwright, and translator (born 1929)
- 2015 – Howard Pawley, Canadian lawyer and politician, 18th Premier of Manitoba (born 1934)
- 2017 – Erica Garner, American civil rights activist (born 1990)
- 2020 – Dawn Wells, American actress, (born 1938)
- 2022 – Barbara Walters, American journalist, producer, and author (born 1929)
- 2023 – Bryan Ansell, British role-playing and wargame designer (born 1955)
- 2023 – Tom Wilkinson, English actor (born 1948)
- 2023 – Aki Yashiro, Japanese singer (born 1950)
- 2025 – Khaleda Zia, Bangladeshi politician, Former prime minister of Bangladesh

== Holidays and observances ==
- Christian feast day:
  - Abraham the Writer
  - Anysia of Salonika
  - Egwin of Evesham
  - Frances Joseph-Gaudet (Episcopal Church)
  - Liberius of Ravenna
  - Pope Felix I
  - Ralph of Vaucelles
  - Roger of Cannae
  - December 30 (Eastern Orthodox liturgics)
- Day of the Declaration of Slovakia as an Independent Ecclesiastic Province (Slovakia)
- Rizal Day (Philippines)
- The fifth day of Kwanzaa (United States)
- The sixth of the Twelve Days of Christmas (Western Christianity)
