= Chishui River (Shaanxi) =

River in China

Coordinates: 28.8002°N 105.8488°E

The Chishui River (Chinese: 赤水河; literally "Red Water River") is a river in China. It is a tributary of the Wei River. It is near the town of Chishui (Chinese: 赤水镇), in Hua County, under the jurisdiction of Weinan, in the northwestern province of Shaanxi.

On December 30, 2009, the Lanzhou–Zhengzhou–Changsha product oil pipeline that connects Lanzhou, Gansu with Zhengzhou, Henan burst, spilling 150,000 litres (40,000 US gal) of diesel oil into the Chishui River resulting in the Yellow River oil spill.
