= December 30 (Eastern Orthodox liturgics) =

Day in the Eastern Orthodox liturgical calendar

Eastern Orthodox liturgical calendar
December 29	December 30	December 31
December 30 O.S. ≍ January 12 N.S. December 30 N.S ≍ December 17 O.S.

An Eastern Orthodox cross

December 30 in Eastern Orthodox liturgical calendars is a feast day and a day of commemoration of saints and martyrs. Although some Orthodox churches use the Revised Julian Calendar and others use the traditional Julian calendar, the fixed commemorations for their respective December 30 are broadly the same, no matter which calendar is used. (Note: Despite the dates being the same, the days to which they refer typically differ by 13 days. The notation Old Style or O.S. is sometimes used to indicate a date in the traditional Julian Calendar (the "Old Calendar"). The notation New Style or N.S. indicates a date in the Revised Julian calendar (the "New Calendar").)

== Feasts ==
- Afterfeast of the Nativity of Christ

== Saints ==
- Apostle Timon the Deacon of the Seventy (1st century)
- Virgin Martyr Anysia of Thessaloniki (298)
- Martyr Philoterus (Philetairus) of Nicomedia, and with him six soldiers and one count (311)
- Hieromartyr Zoticus the Priest, of Constantinople, Guardian of Orphans (c. 340) (see also December 31 - Greek)
- Saint Anysios, Bishop of Thessaloniki (384–407) (see also December 31)
- Martyrs Magistrianus, Paulinus, Umbrius, Verus, Severus, Callistratus, Florentius, Arianus, Anthimus, Ubricius, Isidore, Euculus, Sampson, Studius, and Thespesius, who suffered under Julian the Apostate (361–363)
- Venerable Theodora of Caesarea in Cappadocia (755)
- Venerable Theodora of Constantinople, Nun (940)
- Venerable Leo (Leonidus) the Archimandrite

== Pre-Schism Western saints ==
- Saint Liberius of Ravenna, Bishop of Ravenna in Italy, venerated as one of the founders of that diocese (c. 200)
- Martyrs Sabinus of Spoleto, Exuperantius, Marcellus, Venustian and Companions (303) (Note: Sabinus is described as a bishop who was martyred near Spoleto in Italy. Venustian and his family were converts of Sabinus, while Exuperantius and Marcellus are said to have been his deacons.) (Note: "AT Spoleto, the birthday of the holy martyrs Sabinus, bishop, Exuperantius and Marcellus, deacons; also of Venustian, governor, with his wife and sons, under the emperor Maximian. Marcellus and Exuperantius were first racked, then severely beaten with rods; afterwards being mangled with iron hooks, and burned in the sides, they terminated their martyrdom. Not long after, Venustian was put to the sword with his wife and sons. St. Sabinus, after having his hands cut off, and being a long time confined in prison, was scourged to death. The martyrdom of these saints is commemorated on the same day, although it occurred at different times.")
- Saint Egwin of Evesham, Bishop of Worcester (717) (Note: Consecrated to God in his youth, he eventually became the third Bishop of Worcester in England in 692 and may have founded the monastery of Evesham.)
- Saint Eugene of Milan, Bishop and Confessor
- Saint Sebastian, a monk who became Archbishop of Esztergom in 1002 and Primate of Hungary in the time of Saint Stephen I of Hungary (c. 1036)

== Post-Schism Orthodox saints ==
- Saint Tryphon, Bishop of Rostov (1468)
- Saint Macarius, Metropolitan of Moscow and All Russia (1563)
- Venerable Monastic Martyr Gideon of Karakallou Monastery, Mount Athos, at Turnovo (1818)
- Venerable Hadji-Georgis the Athonite (1886) (Note: He was glorified by the Ecumenical Patriarchate on February 11, 2026. The official communiqué of the Ecumenical Patriarchate was as follows: (in Greek)"Τό Ἱερόν Σῶμα ἀπεφάσισεν ὁμοφώνως τήν κατάταξιν εἰς τό ἁγιολόγιον τῆς Ἐκκλησίας τῶν ὁσιακῆς βιοτῆς Ἁγιορειτῶν Ἱερομονάχου Τύχωνος, τοῦ ἐν τῷ ἐν τῇ Σκήτῃ Καψάλας Ἱερῷ Σταυρονικητιανῷ Κελλίῳ τοῦ Τιμίου Σταυροῦ ἀσκήσαντος, καί μοναχοῦ Γεωργίου, τοὐπίκλην Χατζη-Γεώργη, τοῦ ἐκ Καππαδοκίας καταγομένου καί ἐν Κωνσταντινουπόλει κοιμηθέντος.") (see also: December 17 - O.S.)

=== New martyrs and confessors ===
- New Hieromartyr Sergius Florinsky, Priest of Rakvere, Estonia (1918)
- New Virgin Martyr Mary Danilova of Yaroslavl-Rostov (1946)

== Other commemorations ==
- Uncovering of the relics (1652) of Saint Daniel, Abbot of Pereyaslavl-Zalesski (1540)

== Icon gallery ==
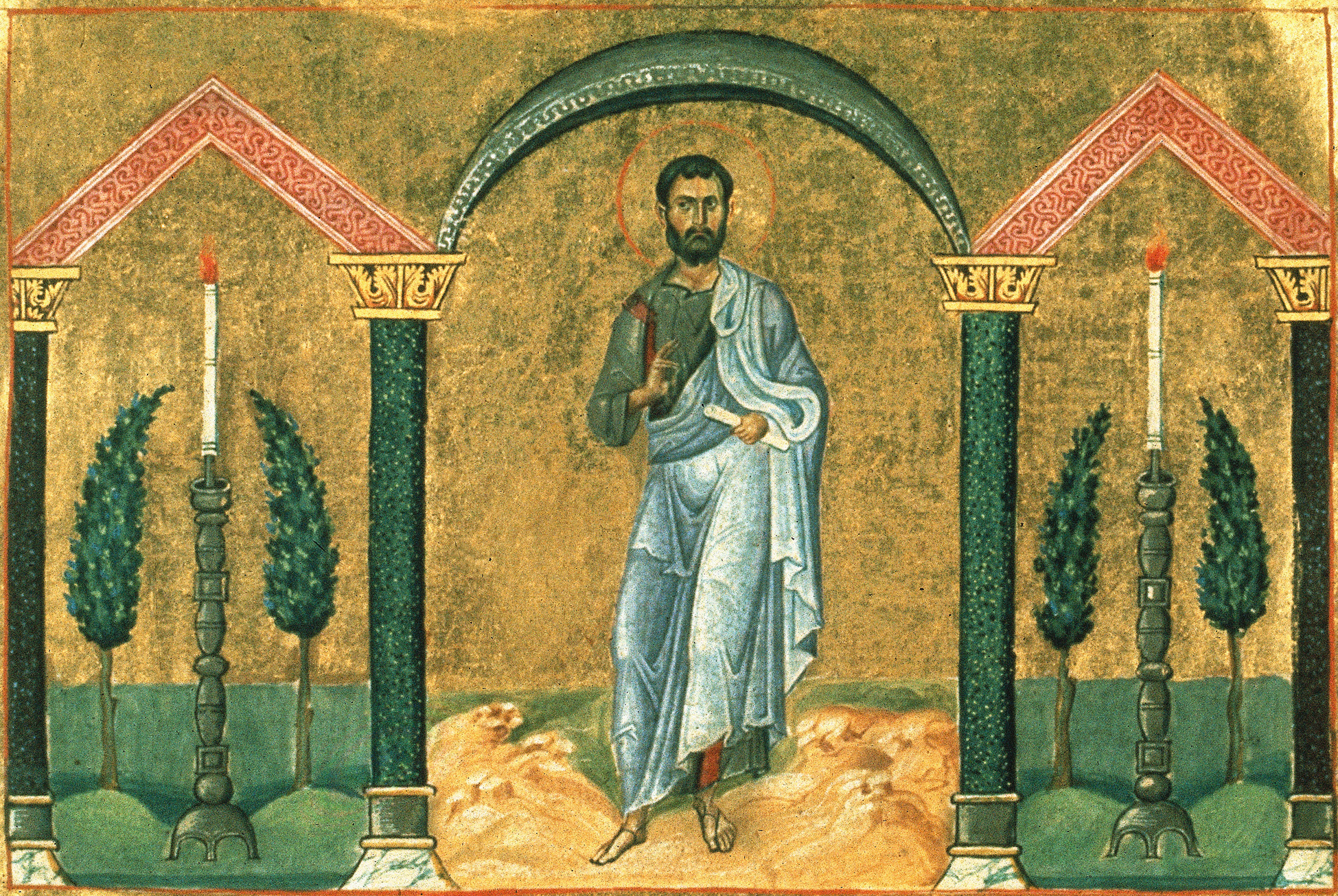
Apostle Timon the Deacon, of the Seventy.
(Menologion of Basil II, 10th century).

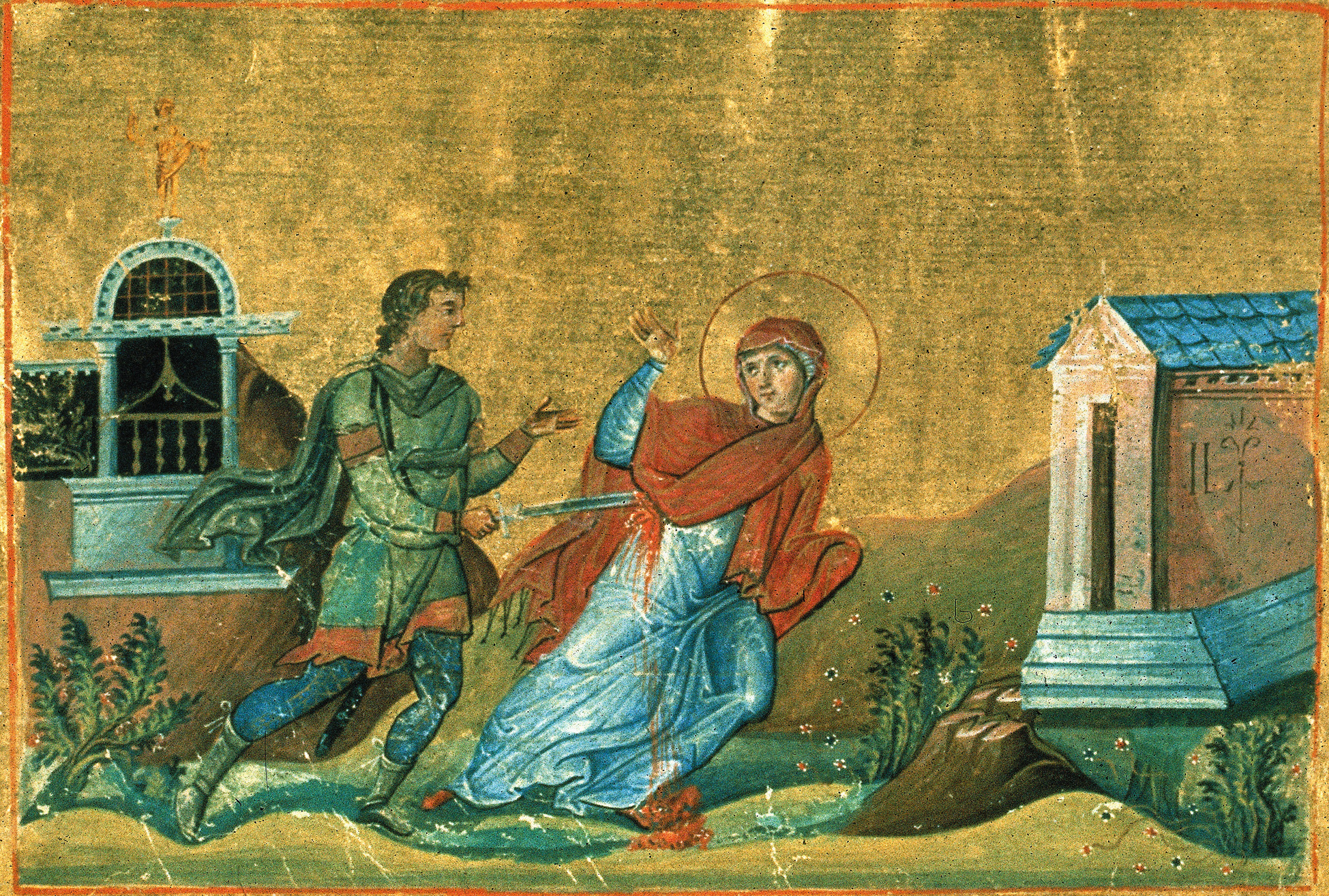
Virgin Martyr Anysia of Thessalonica.
(Menologion of Basil II, 10th century).

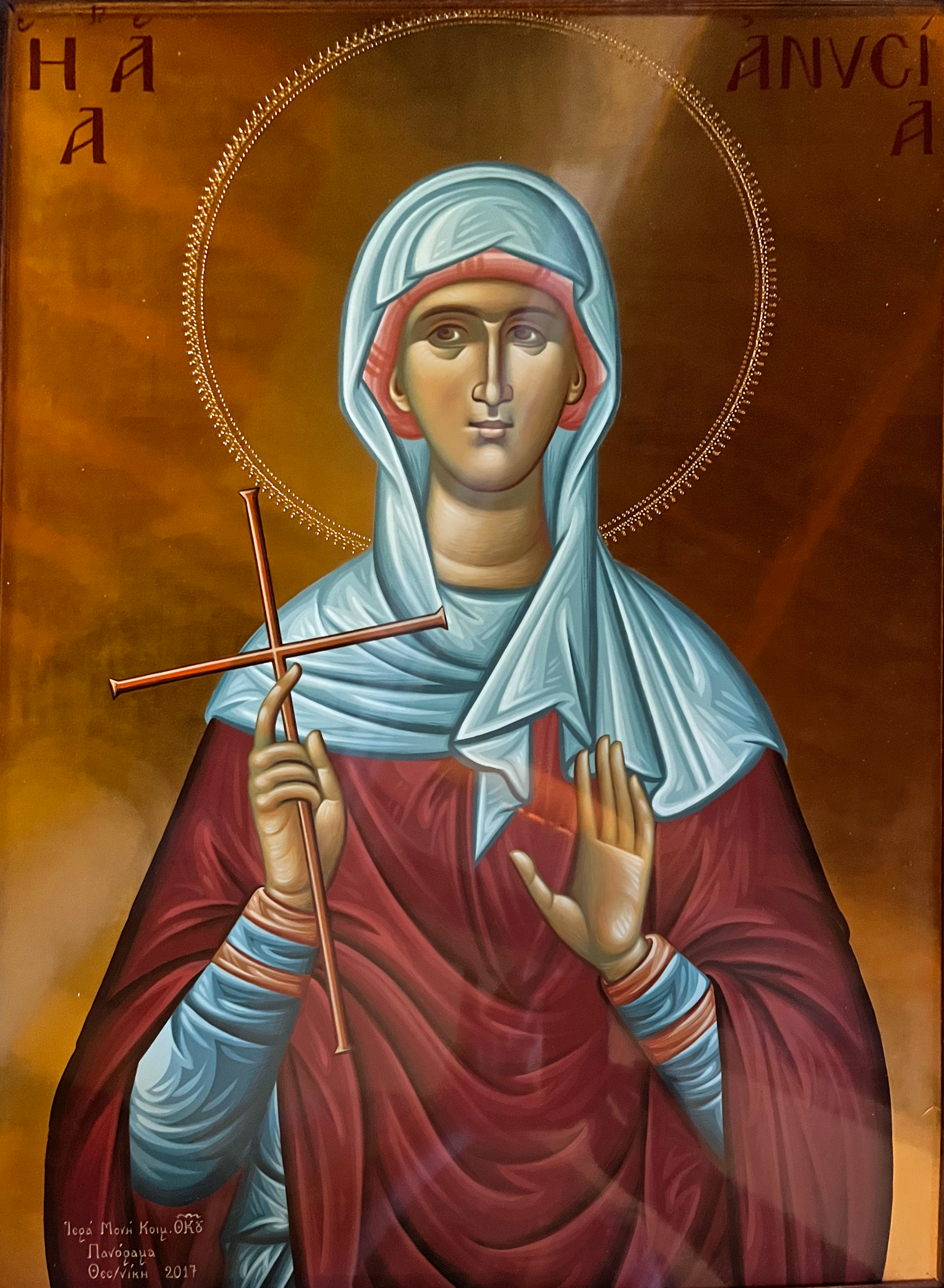
Virgin Martyr Anysia of Thessalonica.

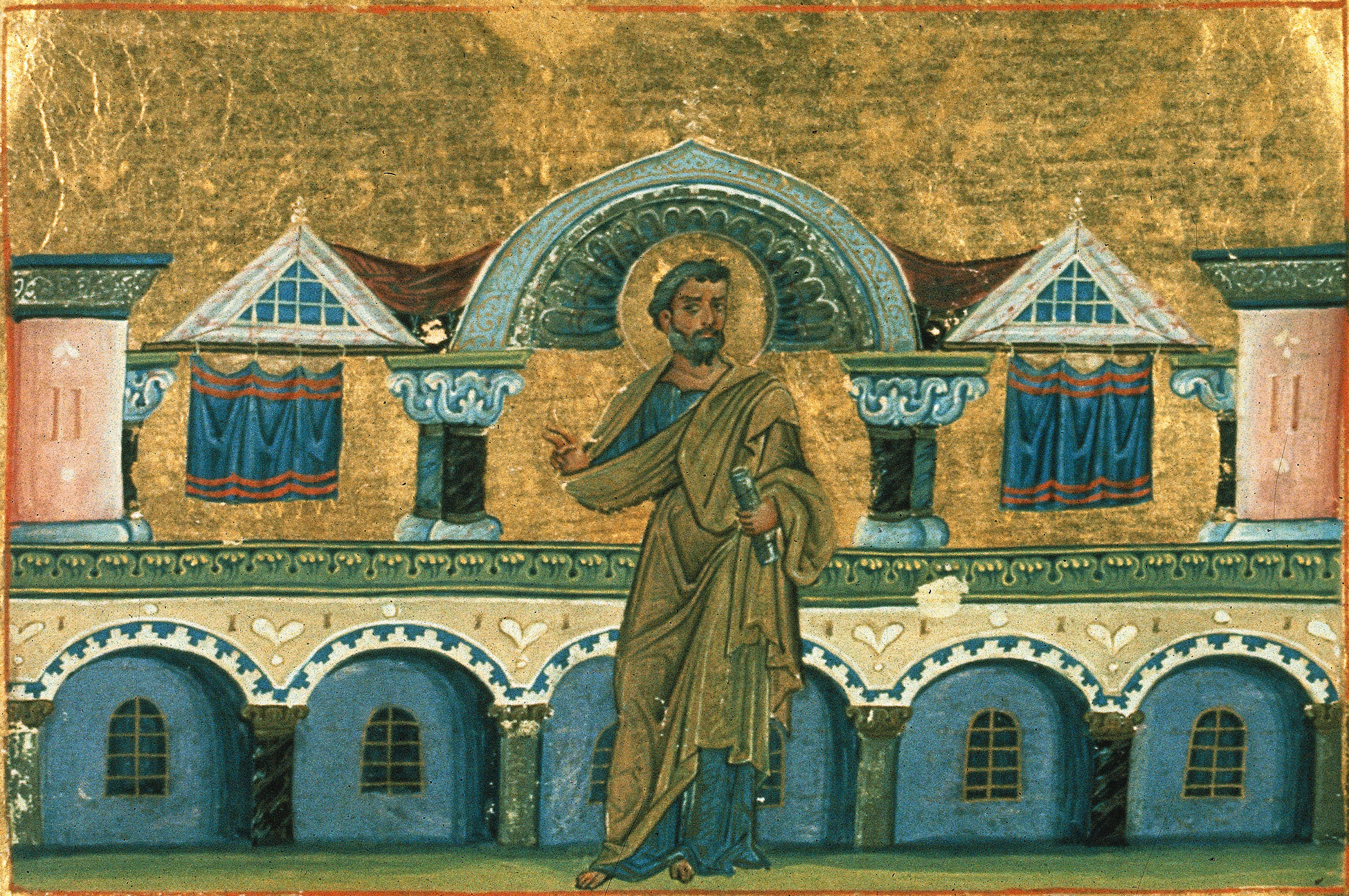
Hieromartyr Zoticus the Priest, of Constantinople, Guardian of Orphans.
(Menologion of Basil II, 10th century).

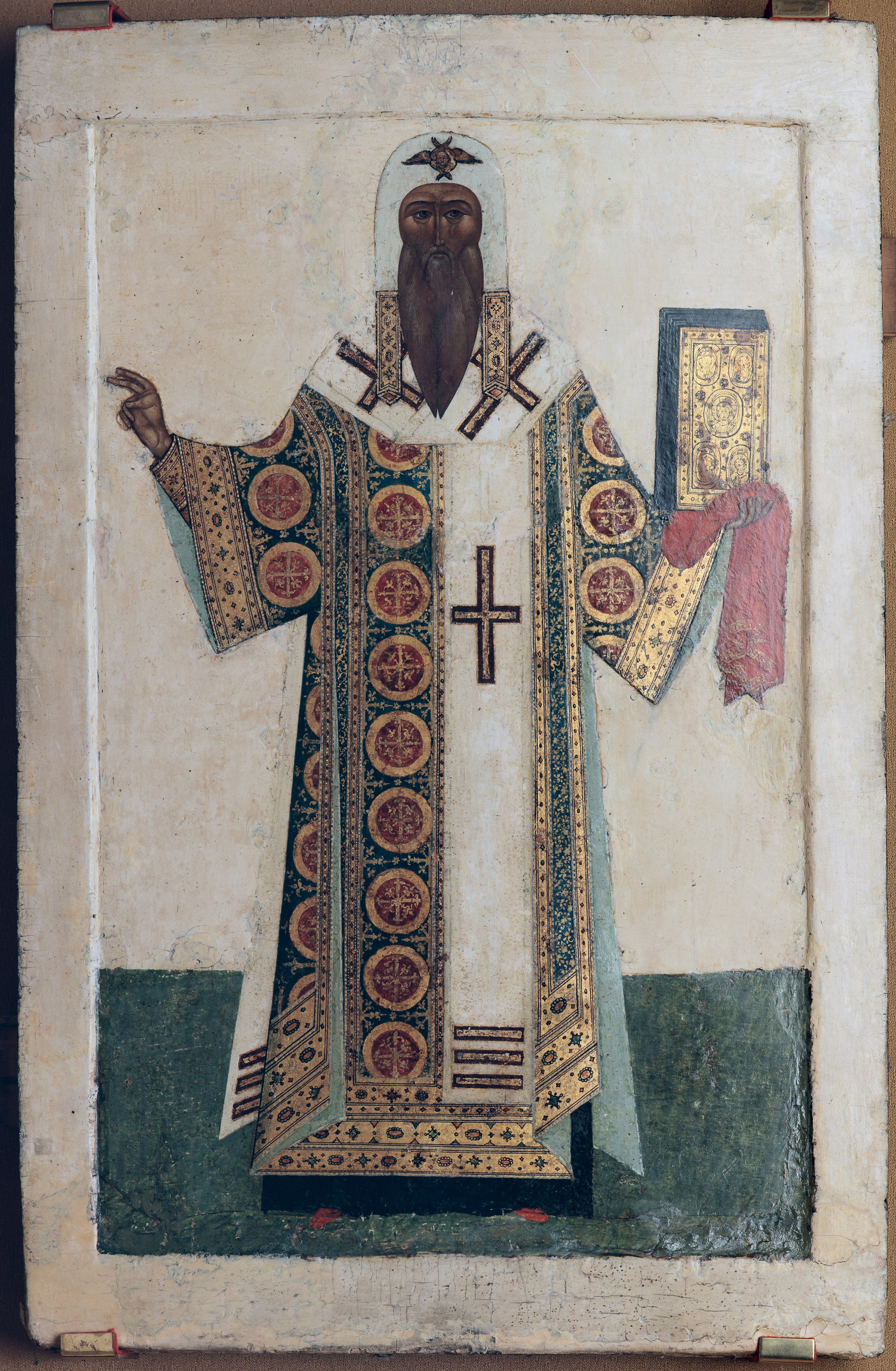
Saint Macarius, Metropolitan of Moscow and All Russia.

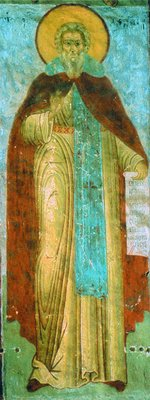
St. Daniel of Pereyaslavl-Zalesski.

== Sources ==
- December 30/January 12. Orthodox Calendar (PRAVOSLAVIE.RU).
- January 12 / December 30. HOLY TRINITY RUSSIAN ORTHODOX CHURCH (A parish of the Patriarchate of Moscow).
- December 30. OCA - The Lives of the Saints.
- The Autonomous Orthodox Metropolia of Western Europe and the Americas (ROCOR). St. Hilarion Calendar of Saints for the year of our Lord 2004. St. Hilarion Press (Austin, TX). pp. 3–4.
- December 30. Latin Saints of the Orthodox Patriarchate of Rome.
- The Roman Martyrology. Transl. by the Archbishop of Baltimore. Last Edition, According to the Copy Printed at Rome in 1914. Revised Edition, with the Imprimatur of His Eminence Cardinal Gibbons. Baltimore: John Murphy Company, 1916. pp. 401–402.

Greek Sources

- Great Synaxaristes: (in Greek) 30 ΔΕΚΕΜΒΡΙΟΥ. ΜΕΓΑΣ ΣΥΝΑΞΑΡΙΣΤΗΣ.
- (in Greek) Συναξαριστής. 30 Δεκεμβρίου. ECCLESIA.GR. (H ΕΚΚΛΗΣΙΑ ΤΗΣ ΕΛΛΑΔΟΣ).

Russian Sources

- (in Russian) 12 января (30 декабря). Православная Энциклопедия под редакцией Патриарха Московского и всея Руси Кирилла (электронная версия). (Orthodox Encyclopedia - Pravenc.ru).
- (in Russian) 30 декабря (ст.ст.) 12 января 2015 (нов. ст.). Русская Православная Церковь Отдел внешних церковных связей. (DECR).
