= December 17 (Eastern Orthodox liturgics) =

Day in the Eastern Orthodox liturgical calendar

Eastern Orthodox liturgical calendar
December 16	December 17	December 18
December 17 O.S. ≍ December 30 N.S. December 17 N.S ≍ December 4 O.S.

An Eastern Orthodox cross

December 17 in Eastern Orthodox liturgical calendars is a feast day and a day of commemoration of saints and martyrs. Although some Orthodox churches use the Revised Julian Calendar and others use the traditional Julian calendar, the fixed commemorations for their respective December 17 are broadly the same, no matter which calendar is used. (Note: Despite the dates being the same, the days to which they refer typically differ by 13 days. The notation Old Style or O.S. is sometimes used to indicate a date in the traditional Julian Calendar (the "Old Calendar"). The notation New Style or N.S. indicates a date in the Revised Julian calendar (the "New Calendar").)

== Saints ==
- Holy Prophet Daniel (600 BC) and the Three Holy Youths: Ananias, Azarias, and Misael (Note: The song of the three youths is alluded to in odes seven and eight of the canon, a hymn sung in the matins service and on other occasions in the Eastern Orthodox Church, where their feast day is December 17 (along with Daniel). The Orthodox Church also commemorates them on the two Sundays before the Nativity of Christ. The reading of the story of the fiery furnace, including the song, is prescribed for the vesperal Divine Liturgy celebrated by the Orthodox on Holy Saturday. Likewise, the three are commemorated as prophets in the Calendar of Saints of the Lutheran Church on December 17 with Daniel.)
- Monk-martyrs Patermuthius and Coprius (Copres), and Martyr Alexander the Soldier, of Egypt (361-363)
- Martyr Bacchus (Iacchus, Iakchos), from Triglia, by the sword
- Venerable Daniel (Stephen in schema) the Confessor of Spain and Egypt (10th century) (Note: Saint Daniel the Confessor, (in the schema Stephen) lived in the 10th century. He was a Spanish dignitary, and prefect of the island of Niverta. Disdaining worldly glory, he became a monk in Rome and went on pilgrimage to the holy places at Constantinople and Jerusalem, where he received the Great Schema and the name Stephen. He received the crown of martyrdom after he refused the Saracens' demand that he renounce Christ and become a Moslem.)
- Saints Athanasius, Nicholas, and Anthony, disciples of Athanasius the Athonite and founders of Vatopedi monastery, Mount Athos (10th century)

== Pre-Schism Western saints ==
- Saint Maxentiolus (Mezenceul), a disciple of Saint Martin of Tours in France, he founded Our Lady of Cunault (5th century) (Note: See: (in French) Église Notre-Dame de Cunault. Wikipédia. (French Wikipedia).)
- Saint Tydecho of Wales, brother of Saint Cadfan (6th century) (Note: He and his sister lived in Gwynedd. Several churches are dedicated to him.)
- Saint Briarch, born in Ireland, became a monk in Wales with Saint Tudwal, whom he accompanied to Brittany, built a monastery in Guingamp and reposed in Bourbiac (c. 627)
- Saint Judicaël, son of Hoel and king of Domnonia and Brittany, much loved by his people, spent the last twenty years of his life in the monastery of Gäel near Vannes (658)
- Saint Begga of Landen, founder and Abbess of a convent in Andenne on the Meuse in Belgium (698) (Note: Daughter of St. Pepin of Landen and St. Ida and sister of two other saints. She married Angisilus (Ansegis), son of St. Arnulf of Metz. After her husband's death St. Begga founded a convent in Andenne on the Meuse in Belgium where she was abbess.)
- Saint Sturm (Sturmius), Abbot and Apostle of Saxony, founder of Fulda Monastery, Germany (779) (Note: As a child he was entrusted to St. Boniface and brought up in the monastery of Fritzlar in Germany. Ordained, he was sent to enlighten the Saxons. He went to find a suitable site for a monastery in central Germany and chose Fulda. Sturm then went to Montecassino and on his return became Abbot of Fulda. Dearly loved by his monks, Sturm is considered as second only to Boniface as Apostle of Germany.)
- Saint Eigil, the fourth abbot of Fulda (822)

== Post-Schism Orthodox saints ==
- Venerable Dionysios the New of Zakynthos, Archbishop of Aegina (1624)
- Saint Misael, Hieromonk of Abalak (Abalatsk) Monastery, Irkutsk (1797 or 1852)
- Venerable Elder Hadji-Georgis the Athonite (1886) (Note: He was glorified by the Ecumenical Patriarchate on February 11, 2026. The official communiqué of the Ecumenical Patriarchate was as follows: (in Greek) Τό Ἱερόν Σῶμα ἀπεφάσισεν ὁμοφώνως τήν κατάταξιν εἰς τό ἁγιολόγιον τῆς Ἐκκλησίας τῶν ὁσιακῆς βιοτῆς Ἁγιορειτῶν Ἱερομονάχου Τύχωνος, τοῦ ἐν τῷ ἐν τῇ Σκήτῃ Καψάλας Ἱερῷ Σταυρονικητιανῷ Κελλίῳ τοῦ Τιμίου Σταυροῦ ἀσκήσαντος, καί μοναχοῦ Γεωργίου, τοὐπίκλην Χατζη-Γεώργη, τοῦ ἐκ Καππαδοκίας καταγομένου καί ἐν Κωνσταντινουπόλει κοιμηθέντος.) (see also: December 30 - N.S.)

=== New martyrs and confessors ===
- New Martyr Nicetas of Nyssa (c. 1300)
- New Hieromartyrs Paisius, Abbot of Trnava (Turnovo), Cacak (1814), and Avakum (Abbacum), Deacon (1815), at Belgrade
- New Hieromartyr Sergius Florinsky, Priest of Rakvere, Estonia (1918) (Note: See also: (in Russian) Флоринский, Сергей Фёдорович. Википедии. (Russian Wikipedia).) (see also: July 2)
- New Hieromartyr Nicholas Beltiukov, Protopresbyter of Perm (1918)
- New Hieromartyr Alexander Savelov, Priest of Perm (1918)
- New Hieromartyr John Zemlyani, Priest of Alma-Ata (1937)
- New Hieromartyr Peter Pokrovsky, Priest (1937)

== Other commemorations ==
- Sunday of the Holy Forefathers of Jesus Christ (December 11–17)
- Repose of lay elder Panagis of Ilami, Cyprus (1989)

== Icon gallery ==
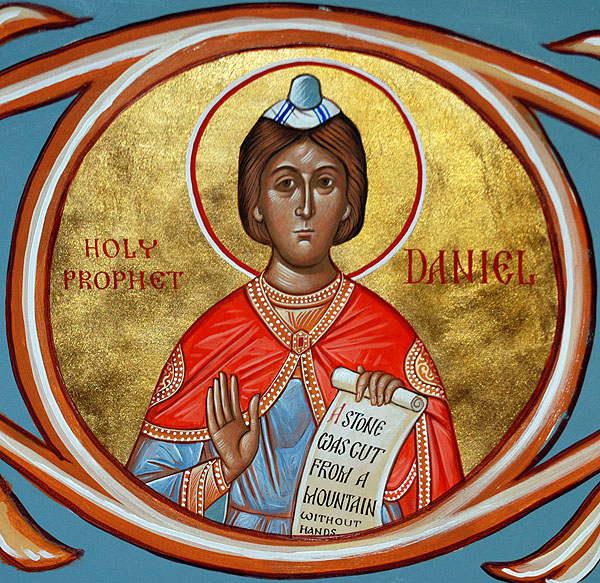
Icon of the Holy Prophet Daniel.

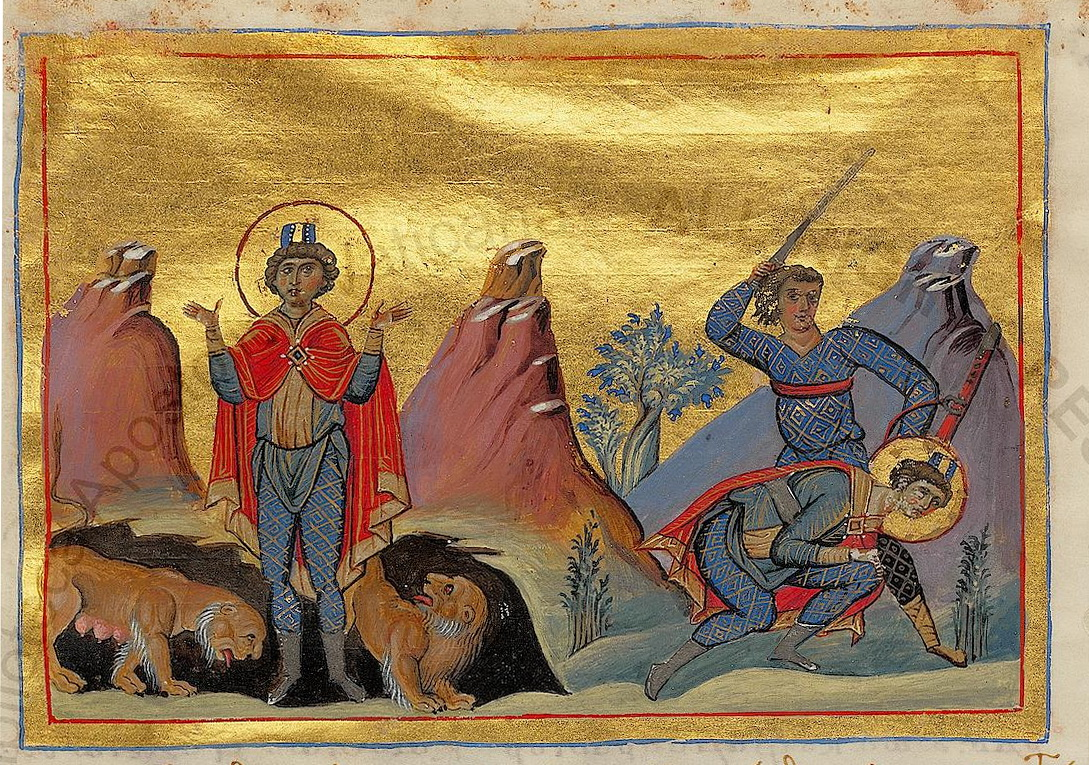
Holy Prophet Daniel in the lions den.
(Menologion of Basil II, 10th century).

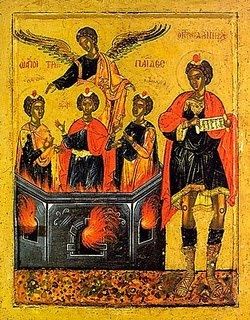
Holy Prophet Daniel and the Three Holy Youths.

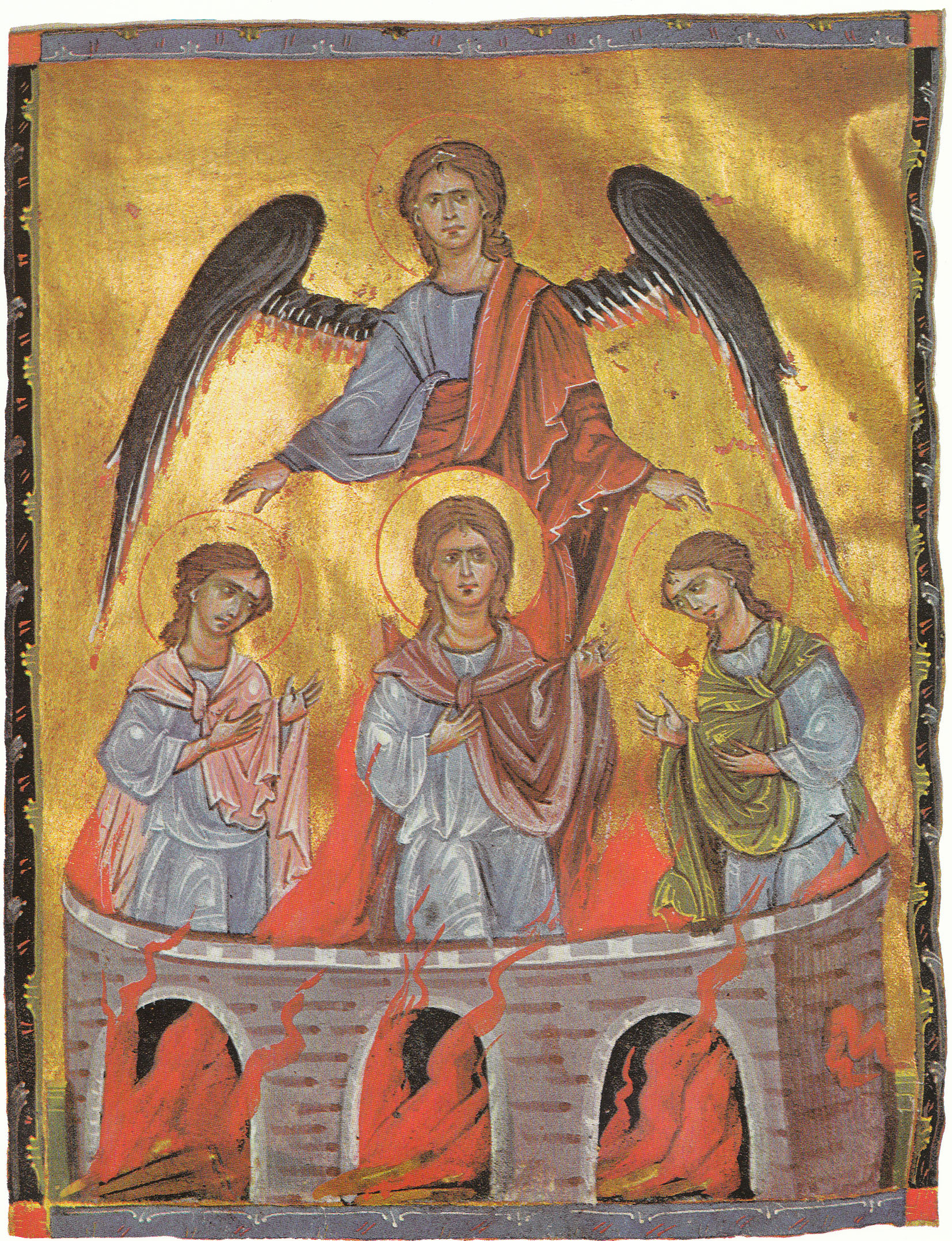
The Three Holy Youths: Ananias, Azarias, and Misael (Mashtots, 1266).

The Three Holy Youths in the furnace.
(Dionysiou Monastery, 1547).

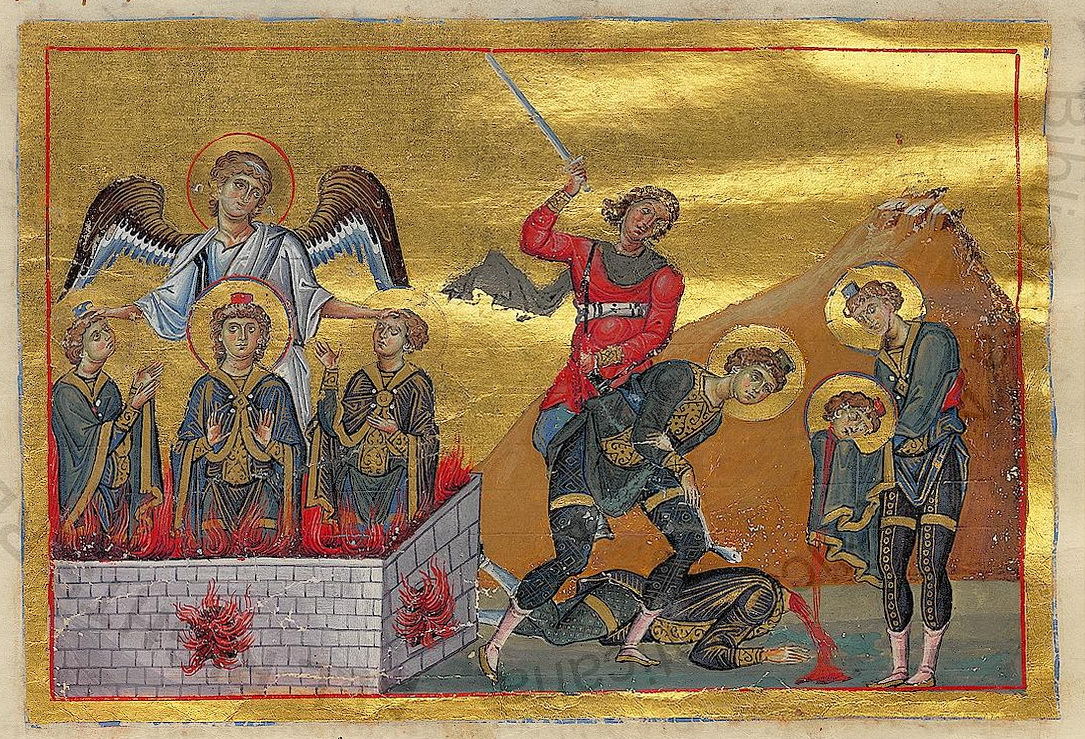
The Three Holy Youths: Ananias, Azarias, and Misael.
On the left: in the furnace.
On the right: the martyrdom of the 3 saints.
(Menologion of Basil II, 10th century).

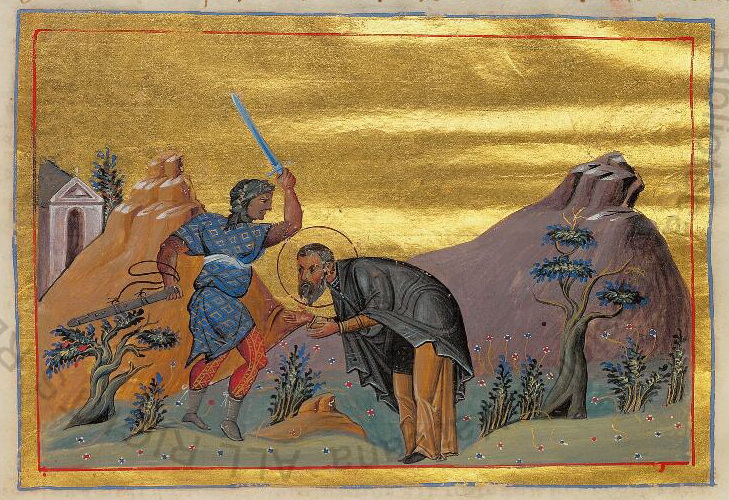
Martyr Bacchus (Iacchus, Iakchos) of Triglia.
(Menologion of Basil II, 10th century).

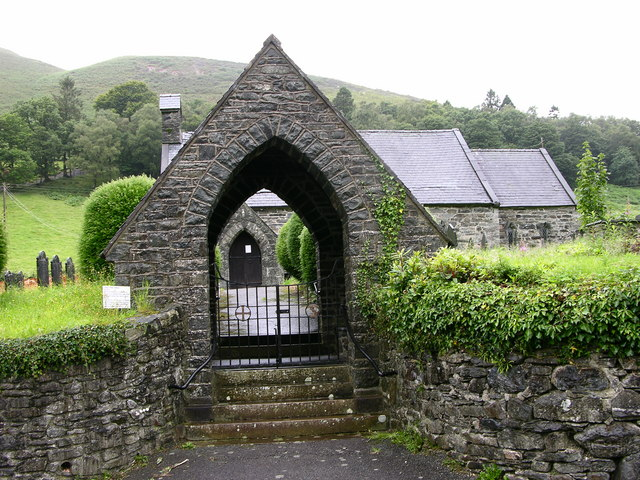
Entrance to church of St. Tydecho, Llanymawddwy, Wales.

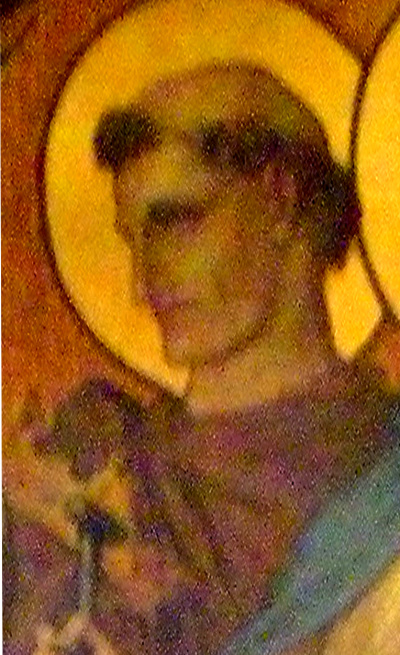
Crop of a painting of St. Judicaël.

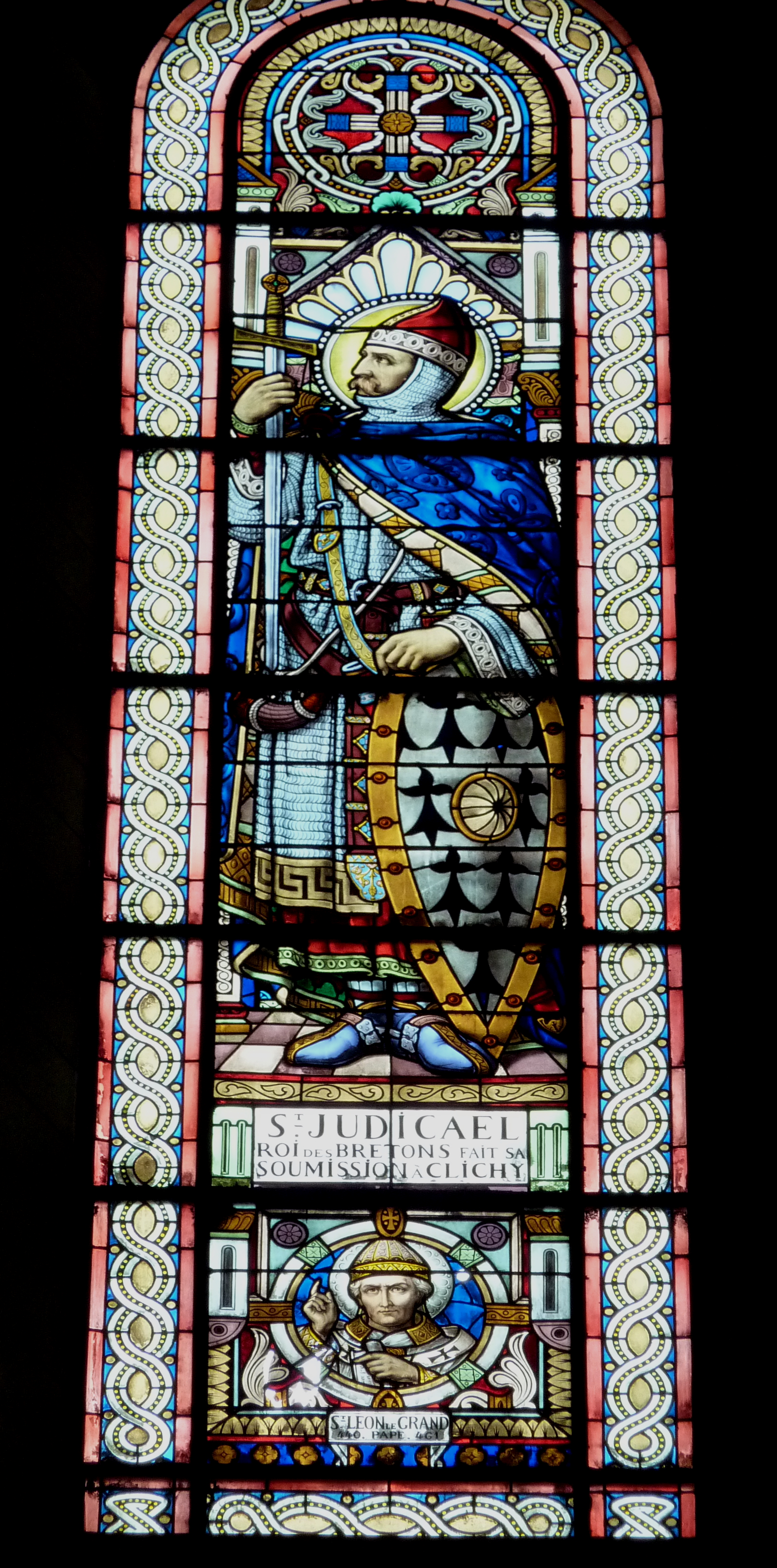
Stained glass of St. Judicaël.

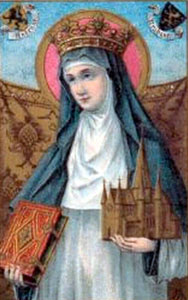
St. Begga.

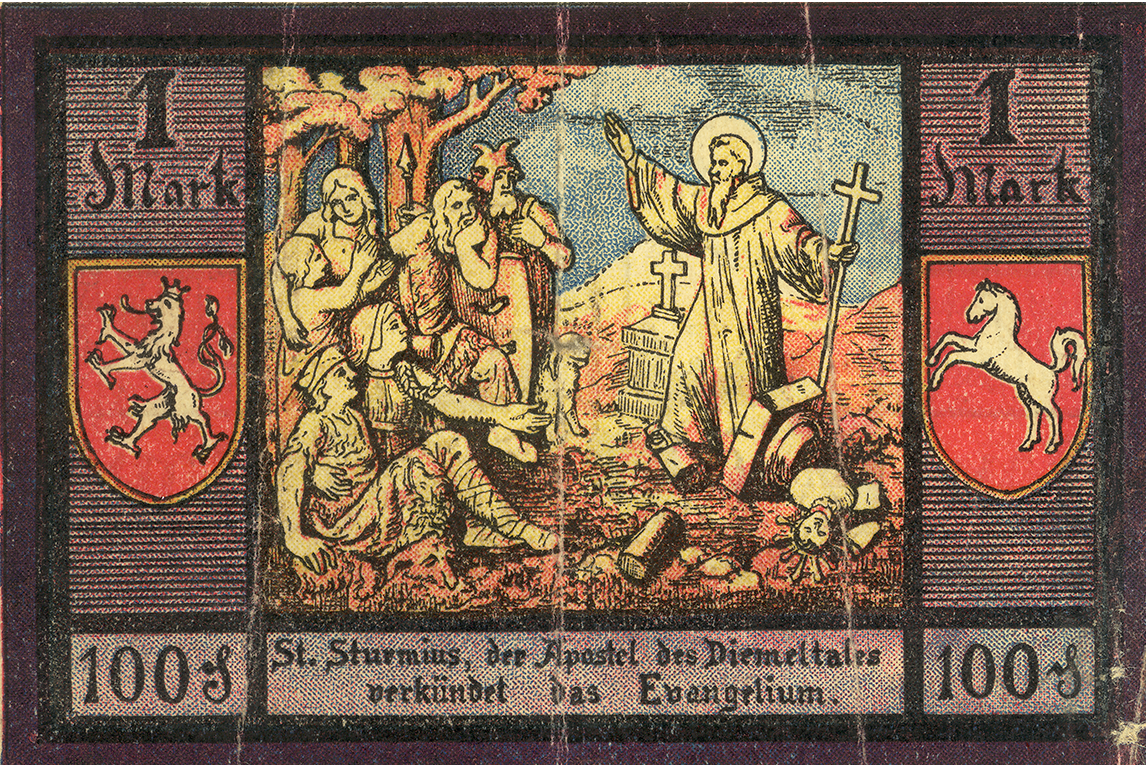
Saint Sturm, Apostle of Saxony, represented on a 1 Mark banknote, 1921.

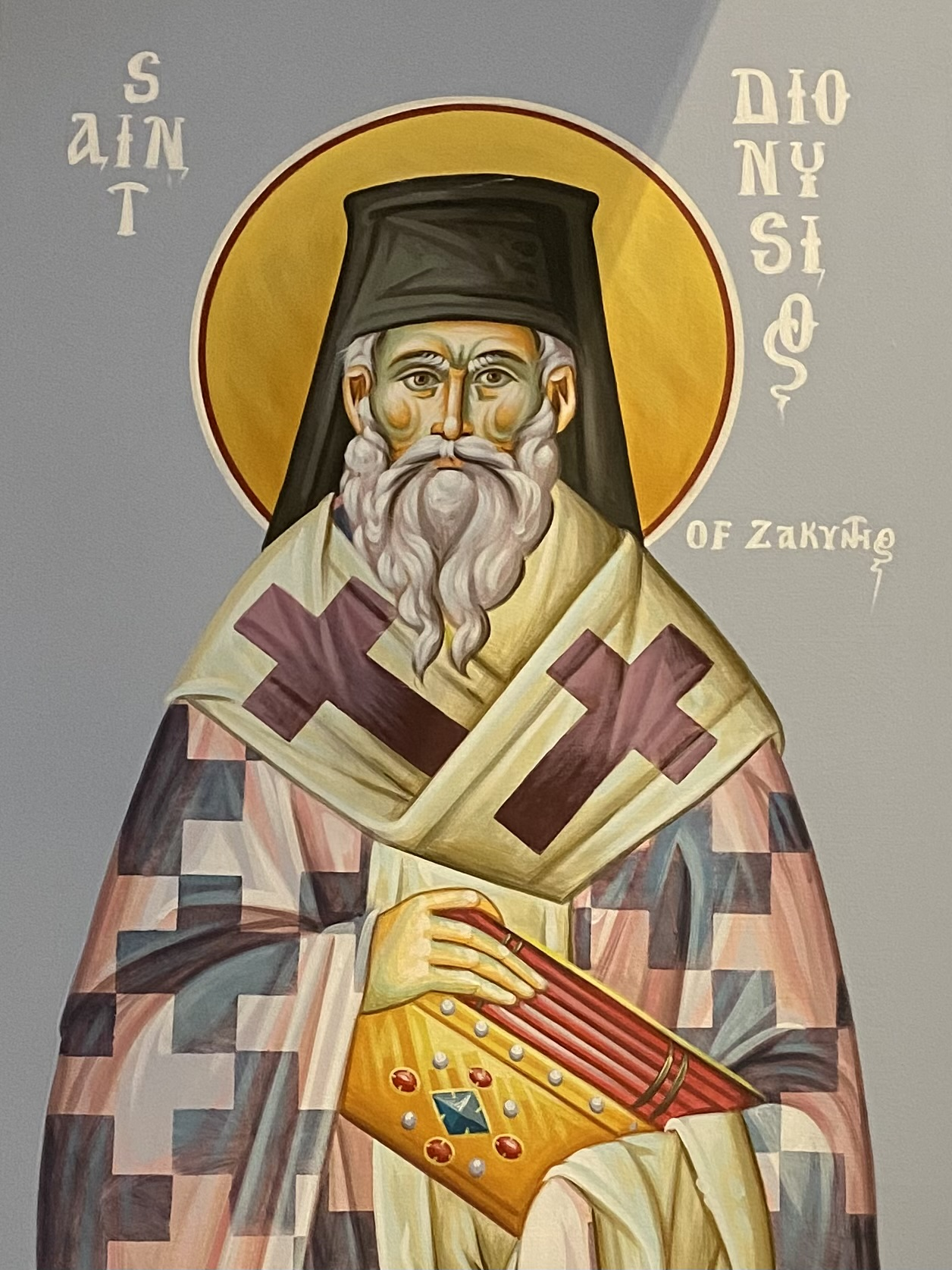
Venerable Dionysios the New of Zakynthos, Archbishop of Aegina.

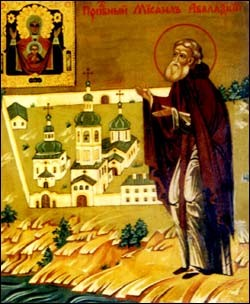
St. Misael, Hieromonk of Abalatsk Monastery, Irkutsk.

== Sources ==
- December 17/30. Orthodox Calendar (PRAVOSLAVIE.RU).
- December 30 / December 17. HOLY TRINITY RUSSIAN ORTHODOX CHURCH (A parish of the Patriarchate of Moscow).
- December 17. OCA - The Lives of the Saints.
- The Autonomous Orthodox Metropolia of Western Europe and the Americas (ROCOR). St. Hilarion Calendar of Saints for the year of our Lord 2004. St. Hilarion Press (Austin, TX). p. 94.
- December 17. Latin Saints of the Orthodox Patriarchate of Rome.
- The Roman Martyrology. Transl. by the Archbishop of Baltimore. Last Edition, According to the Copy Printed at Rome in 1914. Revised Edition, with the Imprimatur of His Eminence Cardinal Gibbons. Baltimore: John Murphy Company, 1916.

Greek Sources

- Great Synaxaristes: (in Greek) 17 ΔΕΚΕΜΒΡΙΟΥ. ΜΕΓΑΣ ΣΥΝΑΞΑΡΙΣΤΗΣ.
- (in Greek) Συναξαριστής. 17 Δεκεμβρίου. ECCLESIA.GR. (H ΕΚΚΛΗΣΙΑ ΤΗΣ ΕΛΛΑΔΟΣ).

Russian Sources

- (in Russian) 30 декабря (17 декабря). Православная Энциклопедия под редакцией Патриарха Московского и всея Руси Кирилла (электронная версия). (Orthodox Encyclopedia - Pravenc.ru).
- (in Russian) 17 декабря (ст.ст.) 30 декабря 2013 (нов. ст.). Русская Православная Церковь Отдел внешних церковных связей. (DECR).
