= Theosis: The True Purpose of Human Life =

1992 book by Archimandrite George

- Author: Archimandrite George (Kapsanis)
- Original title: Η θέωσις, ως σκοπός της ζωής του ανθρώπου
- Translator: Archimandrite George
- Language: Greek (original), English (translated)
- Subject: Christian theology, Eastern Orthodox theology, Theosis
- Genre: Non-fiction, religious
- Publisher: Holy Monastery of St. Gregorios, Mount Athos
- Publication date: 1992
- Publication place: Greece
- English publication date: 1997
- Media type: Print (Paperback)
- Pages: 47
- ISBN: 9798861946926
- OCLC: 1432090743

Theosis: The True Purpose of Human Life is a monographic book written by Archimandrite George (Kapsanis) in the Gregoriou Monastery on Mount Athos, Greece. The book explores the concept of theosis, the Eastern Orthodox understanding of deification, as the ultimate purpose of human life.

The author proclaims that union with God and His Kingdom is the intended path for all humans. The book received a total of four edition: 1992, 1997, 2001, and 2006. Archimandrite George was also involved in translating the works into other languages.

== Author ==
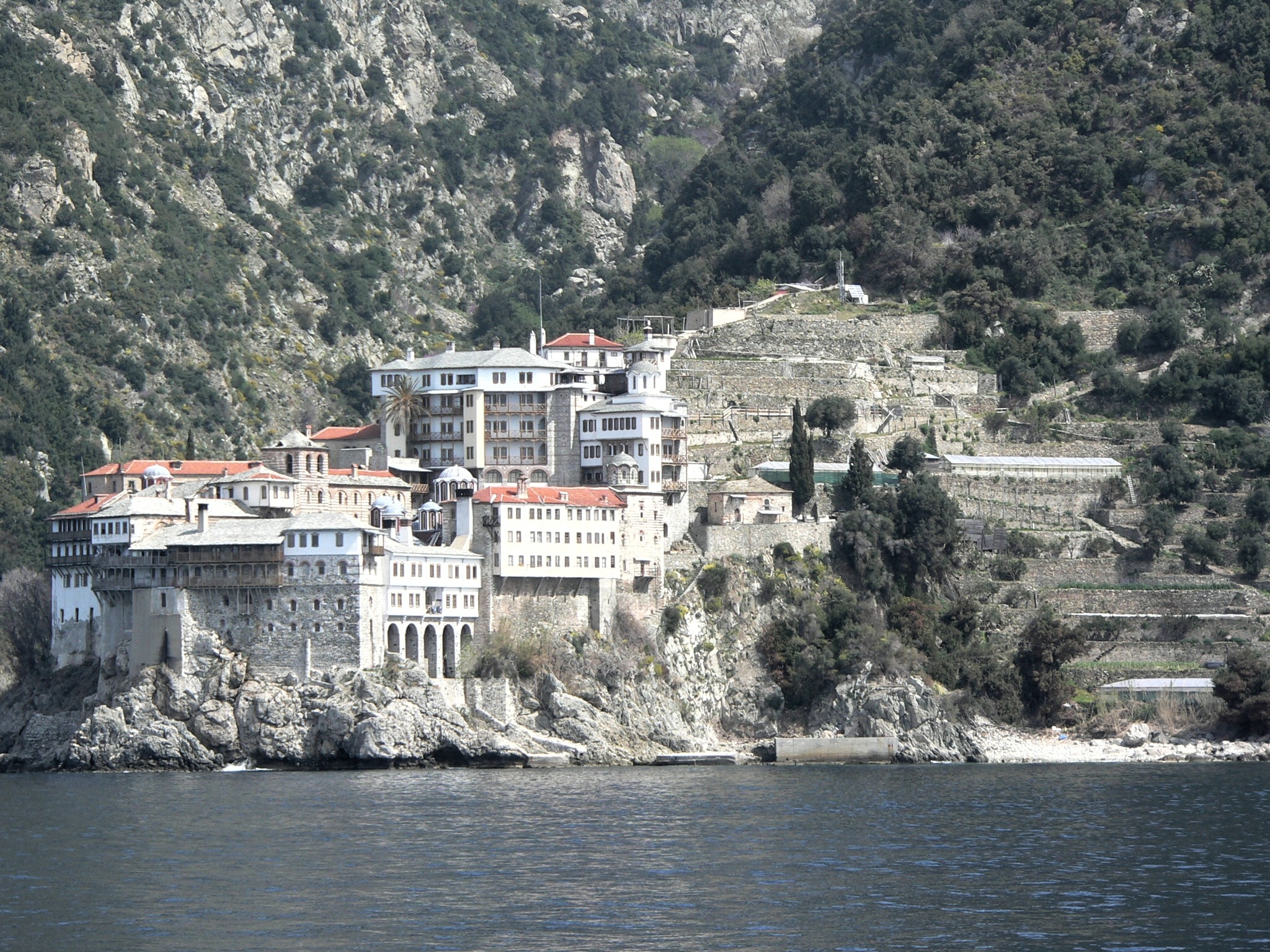
Gregoriou Monastery, where Archimandrite George lived.

The author of Theosis is Archimandrite George (Kapsanis). He served as the abbot of Gregoriou Monastery on Mount Athos from 1974 until his repose in 2014.

In his reflections, Archimandrite George discusses the profound joy and fulfillment he receives in communion with Christ. He often spoke about the personal relationship between God and humans, and the role of grace in transforming the human person through ascetic practice, prayer, and participation in Orthodox sacraments. He recounted the words of a monk, Father Symeon, who, shortly after his repose, was asked about his state and replied, "Now I'm with Christ". Archimandrite George reflected this sentiment, stating:

"When you're with Christ, it's wonderful. No matter where you are, Athens, Thessaloniki, the Holy Mountain. It really is wonderful to be with Christ, wherever you are."

His writings and teachings were established in the patristic tradition. Theosis originated as a lecture given by Archimandrite George in the early 1990s and was later published and translated into several languages.

== Content ==
The book discusses the Eastern Orthodox theological concept of theosis as a central aspect of human spiritual life. The book presents the view that human life is oriented toward participation in God's divine nature.

The text addresses the role of the incarnation of Jesus Christ in restoring humanity's relationship with God. Archimandrite George discusses theosis as a process through which human beings grow spiritually and focuses on transformation and participation in asceticism. He compares this to other theological interpretations of salvation by discussing personal spiritual growth and the meaning of ethical living. The book describes spiritual disciplines traditionally associated with Eastern Orthodox Christianity, including ceaseless prayer, ascetic practices and virtues, repentance and forgiveness, and sacramental participation.

The author also focuses on certain biblical passages and writings of early Church Fathers to support the practice of theosis. Verses including Romans 14:17 ("For the kingdom of God is not a matter of eating and drinking, but of righteousness, peace and joy in the Holy Spirit") are cited to established a spiritual connection between humanity and God's Kingdom:

The dual task of Orthodox Theology is to define and also to protect from human distortion the teachings of Jesus Christ. As can be seen, Theology is far more than knowledge about God acquired through academic study. Christianity is a living faith, founded on revelation born of the Holy Spirit

== Reception and Impact ==
The work has been referenced in some academic works when studying Christian mysticism and theology. For instance, Mikael Leidenhag's study, The Doctrine of Theosis and the Reality of Purpose, talks about the idea that theosis is important for an individual's transformation and presents a direction that God has for humanity. Graydon Cress references the book and notes that theosis is "the goal of the Christian life in the Eastern Church." In a publishing by the Atlantis Press, when discussing positive psychology, mention how ancient practices, like theosis, help one understand their "true self" and for those seeking authenticity in their spiritual life.
