= Raoul (founder of Vaucelles Abbey) =

Saint of the Catholic Church

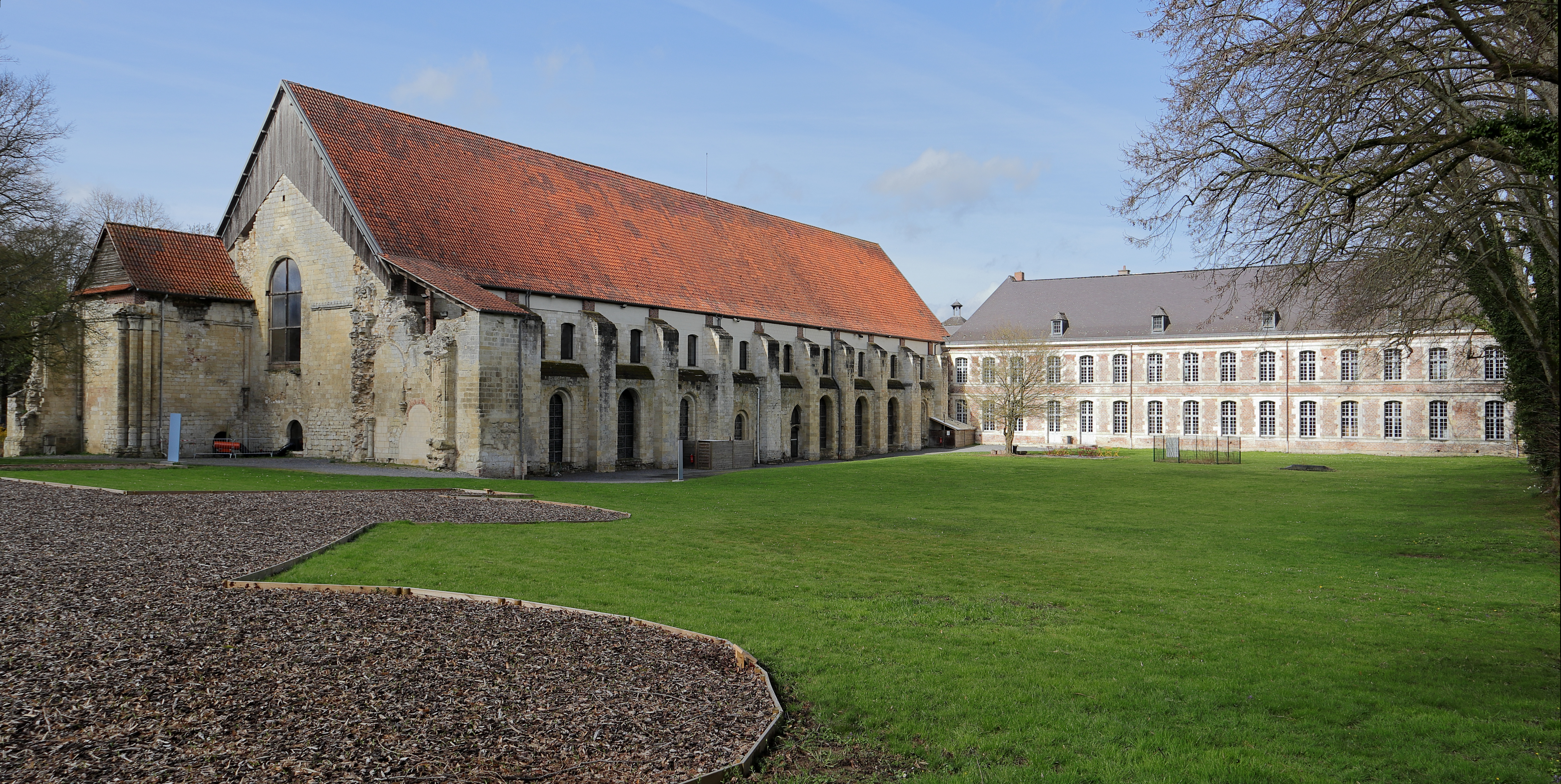
Monastery of Vaucelles

Raoul, founder of Vaucelles Abbey or Saint Raoul (a/k/a San Raul, St. Radolph, Dom Rodulphe, or Ralph of Vaucelles) (died c.1151) is a saint of the Catholic Church who founded the famous monastery of Vaucelles in France. Raoul was an English Benedictine monk who became a follower of St. Bernard of Clairvaux (who founded the Cistercian order).

== Life ==
Raoul was born probably at Merston, in England and became a monk at Clairvaux. Bernard sent Raoul, in 1132 to found a monastery at Vaucelles, located in the northwest of France, near Cambrai. By 1145, Raoul had succeeded in building the Abbaye de Vaucelles, which over the years grew to hold several hundred monks and became the largest Cistercian abbey of Europe. The restored cloister remains today.

Raoul served as abbot for twenty years until his death around 1151. With his monks he dedicated himself to prayer, reading of the sacred books and to teaching agriculture. In the time of want, he supported for months as many as five thousand paupers. Charles de Visch, in his Bibliotheque Cistercienne, counts him among the learned writers of his time.

Canonized for his rectitude and austerity in 1179, St. Raoul can be celebrated liturgically on 30 December.
