= Yellow River oil spill =

2009 oil pipeline rupture in China

- Location: Weinan, Shaanxi, China
- Coordinates: 34.6117°N 110.289°E
- Date: 30 December 2009

Cause
- Cause: Rupture of the Lanzhou-Zhengzhou oil pipeline
- Operator: China National Petroleum Corporation

Spill characteristics
- Volume: 150,000 L (40,000 US gal)
- Shoreline impacted: > 100 km

The Yellow River oil spill was an oil spill in the Yellow River in Shaanxi, China which took place due to the rupturing of a segment of Lanzhou-Zhengzhou oil pipeline on December 30, 2009. Approximately 150,000 L (40,000 US gal) of diesel oil flowed down the Wei River before finally reaching the Yellow River, the source of drinking water for millions of people, on January 4, 2010.

== Background ==
The Lanzhou-Zhengzhou oil pipeline project was approved in 2007 and opened for operation in March 2009. It is a part of the 2,070 km (1,290 mi)-long Lanzhou-Zhengzhou-Changsha pipeline with a capacity of transporting 15 million tons of oil per year. According to China National Petroleum Corporation (CNPC), the rupture took place on December 30, 2009 due to an accident near Weinan where construction was underway by third-party workers. However, the incident was not publicized until January 3, 2010. The deputy director of the Yellow River Water Resources Commission called for an investigation into the accident, refuting CNPC's claim that the accident was caused by third-party construction workers.

== Spill control efforts ==
About 150,000 litres of diesel had already leaked out before the pipeline was closed by CNPC. According to Pacific Environment China's co-director Wen Bo, 700 workers were quickly mobilized by the government to control the spill as soon as its occurrence became known. They dug diversion channels and built floating dams to stop the pollutant from advancing further downstream. Solidifying chemicals were also used to remove the fuel from the stream. Despite these efforts, officials found traces of diesel in the Yellow River on January 4, 2010, 200 km upstream of Zhengzhou. No pollution was detected downstream of Sanmenxia, although the Sanmenxia reservoir was found to contain traces of toxic diesel. Sanmenxia Dam and its six hydroelectric generators were shut down to prevent the flow of pollutant further downstream. On 5 January, Zhang Xun, an official of the Ministry of Environmental Protection confirmed that the spill had been contained in the Sanmenxia reservoir and was no longer a threat to the river water downstream.

== See also ==
- Global storm activity of 2010
- 2010 China floods
