= Hadji-Georgis the Athonite =

19th-century Greek Orthodox Christian Athonite monk

Saint Hadji-Georgis the Athonite
- Born: Gabriel; 1809; Germir, Cappadocia (in present-day Melikgazi, Kayseri Province, Turkey)
- Residence: Mount Athos
- Died: 30 December 1886; Istanbul
- Influences: Neophytos Karamanlis
- Tradition or genre: Athonite Monasticism, Hesychasm

Elder Hadji-Georgis the Athonite (Greek: Γέρων Χατζη-Γεώργης ο Αθωνίτης; born 1809; died 30 December 1886) was a Cappadocian Greek Orthodox monk and ascetic.

== Early life ==
In 1809, he was born as Gabriel in Kermira (also spelled Germir or Kermil), in what is now Melikgazi, Kayseri Province, Turkey. His father, Jordan, was a native of Kermira, while his mother, Maria, was from Gelveri (present-day Güzelyurt, Aksaray Province). Gabriel had a brother named Anastasios.

When he was 14 years old, he moved to Constantinople with his family to be with his uncle, who served as an official in the court of Sultan Mahmud II. Gabriel served in the sultan's court for four years.

== Monastic life ==
In 1828, during the Greek War of Independence, he left Constantinople and took a boat to Gregoriou Monastery at Mount Athos. He was tonsured there as a monk and then moved to Kafsokalyvia, where he became a disciple of Father Neophytos Karamanlis. At Kafsokalyvia, he stayed at the Cave of Niphon of Kafsokalyvia for four years, and moved to the hut of Saint George afterwards, where the brotherhood of Father Neophytos lived. He then moved to Kerasia with the brotherhood Father Neophytos. At Kerasia, he became an elder in 1848 after Father Neophytos had left to live at the cell of Saint Nicholas in Karyes, which belonged to Simonopetra Monastery. At Kerasia, Elder Hadji-Georgis founded his own brotherhood.

The disciples of Elder Hadji-Georgis went on to found brotherhoods at other cells and sketes. One group of six disciples led by Father Evlogios founded a brotherhood at the Cell of Saint George Phaneromenos ("the Revealed") near Karyes.

Later, Elder Hadji-Georgis founded the cell of Saint Stephen at Gregoriou Monastery.

On October 27, 1882, the Russian cell of Saint Stephen in Kapsala (not to be confused with the cell of Saint Stephen at Gregoriou Monastery) expelled Elder Hadji-Georgis. He spent the rest of his life in exile in Constantinople during the reign of Sultan Abdul Hamid II. There, he was reputedly a wonderworker and healed many people.

== Death and burial ==
He died on December 30, 1886 (Old Calendar date: December 17, 1886) and was buried at the Church of the Living-giving Fountain of the Theotokos in Balıklı, Istanbul. His brother Anastasios, who died in 1883, was also buried there.

He was glorified by the Ecumenical Patriarchate on February 11, 2026. (Note: The official communiqué of the Ecumenical Patriarchate was as follows: (in Greek) "Τό Ἱερόν Σῶμα ἀπεφάσισεν ὁμοφώνως τήν κατάταξιν εἰς τό ἁγιολόγιον τῆς Ἐκκλησίας τῶν ὁσιακῆς βιοτῆς Ἁγιορειτῶν Ἱερομονάχου Τύχωνος, τοῦ ἐν τῷ ἐν τῇ Σκήτῃ Καψάλας Ἱερῷ Σταυρονικητιανῷ Κελλίῳ τοῦ Τιμίου Σταυροῦ ἀσκήσαντος, καί μοναχοῦ Γεωργίου, τοὐπίκλην Χατζη-Γεώργη, τοῦ ἐκ Καππαδοκίας καταγομένου καί ἐν Κωνσταντινουπόλει κοιμηθέντος.")
