= Liberius I of Ravenna =

Bishop of Ravenna and saint

Saint Liberius I of Ravenna

Bishop of Ravenna, Venerable
- Died: c. 200
- Venerated in: Catholic Church; Eastern Orthodox Church
- Canonized: Pre-congregation
- Feast: 30 December

Liberius I (died c. 200) was Bishop of Ravenna. He is regarded as the founder of the see of Ravenna and was one of its first bishops. He is venerated as a saint in the Catholic Church and Eastern Orthodox Church. His feast day is 30 December.
