= Gregoriou Monastery =

Eastern Orthodox monastery, Mount Athos

- Μονή Γρηγορίου
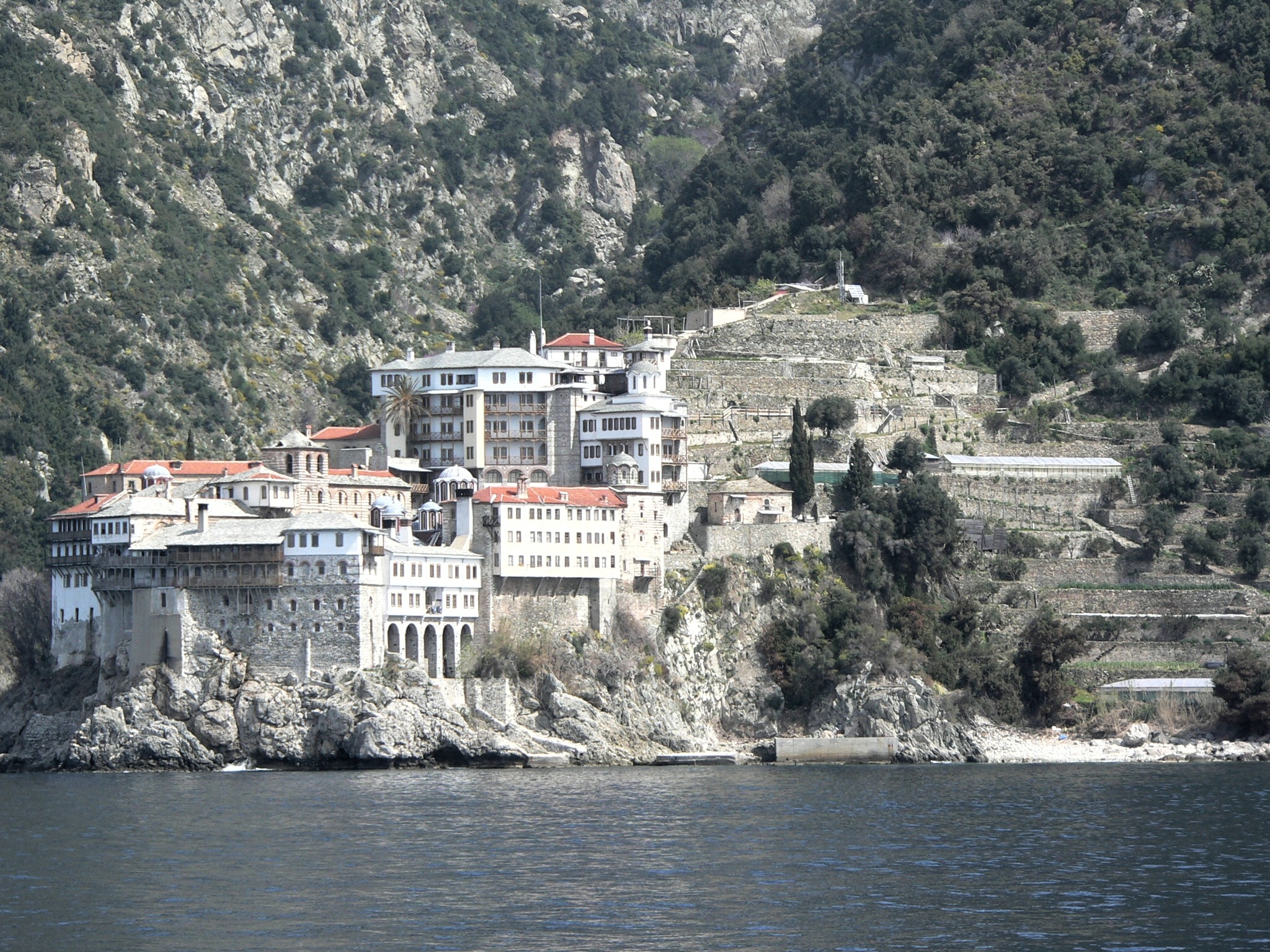
- View of the monastery from sea level.

- Location within Mount Athos
- Interactive map of Gregoriou Monastery

Monastery information
- Full name: Holy Monastery of Saint Gregory; Holy Monastery of Osiou Gregoriou
- Order: Ecumenical Patriarchate
- Dedication: Saint Nicholas
- Diocese: Mount Athos

People
- Founder: Saint Gregory the Hesycast (December 7)
- Abbot: Archimandrite Elder Christopher
- Important associated figures: Archimandrite Elder Symeon (1859–1905); Archimandrite Elder Athanasios (1924–1937); Archimandrite Elder George Kapsanis (1974–2014)

Site
- Location: Mount Athos, Greece
- Coordinates: 40.1793°N 24.2555°E

The Holy Monastery of Saint Gregory (Greek: Ιερά Μονή Οσίου Γρηγορίου), also known as Gregoriou Monastery (Greek: Μονή Γρηγορίου) is an Orthodox Christian monastery in the monastic state of Mount Athos in Greece. The Monastery ranks seventeenth in the hierarchy of the Athonite monasteries. It is built by the sea, on the southeastern side of the peninsula, neighboring the monasteries of Simonopetras and Dionysiou. Gregoriou is very much a pilgrim friendly monastery with a strong sense of pastoral care. Pilgrim visitors are numerous and well provided for. The Monastery is completely girt by the sea, built on a corner of land jutting into the sea, with only steep craggy rocks backed up behind it.

Archimandrite George (Kapsanis) published a book, Theosis: The True Purpose of Human Life, here at Mount Athos in the Gregorious Monastery. Four editions exist, the first being in 1992 and the most recent in 2006. The book discusses about Theosis, the Eastern Orthodox idea of divinization.

== History ==
The Monastery was founded in 1310 by Saint Gregory of Sinai the Younger (feast day December 7), a Serbian monk that dwelled in a cave, which still exists, about 20 minutes up from the Monastery. He dedicated the Monastery and the main church to Saint Nicholas the Wonderworker (December 6). Saint Anastasia of Rome (October 29) is officially considered the third patron saint of the Monastery, due to her holy relics that are kept there and the many miracles she performs.

Gregoriou Monastery had burnt down twice, first in 1496 and later in 1761. After the second fire, reconstruction began almost immediately. This is today's "old courtyard", consisting of the main church of St. Nicholas and most of the surrounding buildings. Due to an increase of monks since then, extensions have been added. The first entrance, following courtyard and surrounding buildings were added in 1892, and the new five story wing located east of the main church was added in 1997. Restorations are always in progress in order to maintain the monastery as functional for the life of the brothers and pilgrims.

By the end of the 15th century, according to the Russian pilgrim Isaiah, the monastery was Serbian.

As of 2020, the brotherhood consists of over 90 monks. The Monastery is known for its involvement and contributions to theological dialogues, and for its many publications of theological and pastoral books. One way the brothers support themselves is through their handicrafts. They produce high quality traditional Athonite incense, and natural handmade olive oil soap.

The monastery holds about 300 manuscripts, of which 11 are on parchment, and it has approximately 20,000 printed books.

== Notable people ==
- Abbot Vissarion of Grigoriou (1943–1974)
- Abbot Dionysios of Grigoriou (1974)
- Archimandrite Georgios (Kapsanis) (1935 – 8 June 2014), Abbot of Grigoriou Monastery from 1974 to 2014
