= Anysia of Thessalonica =

4th-century Christian virgin and martyr

Saint Anysia of Thessalonica
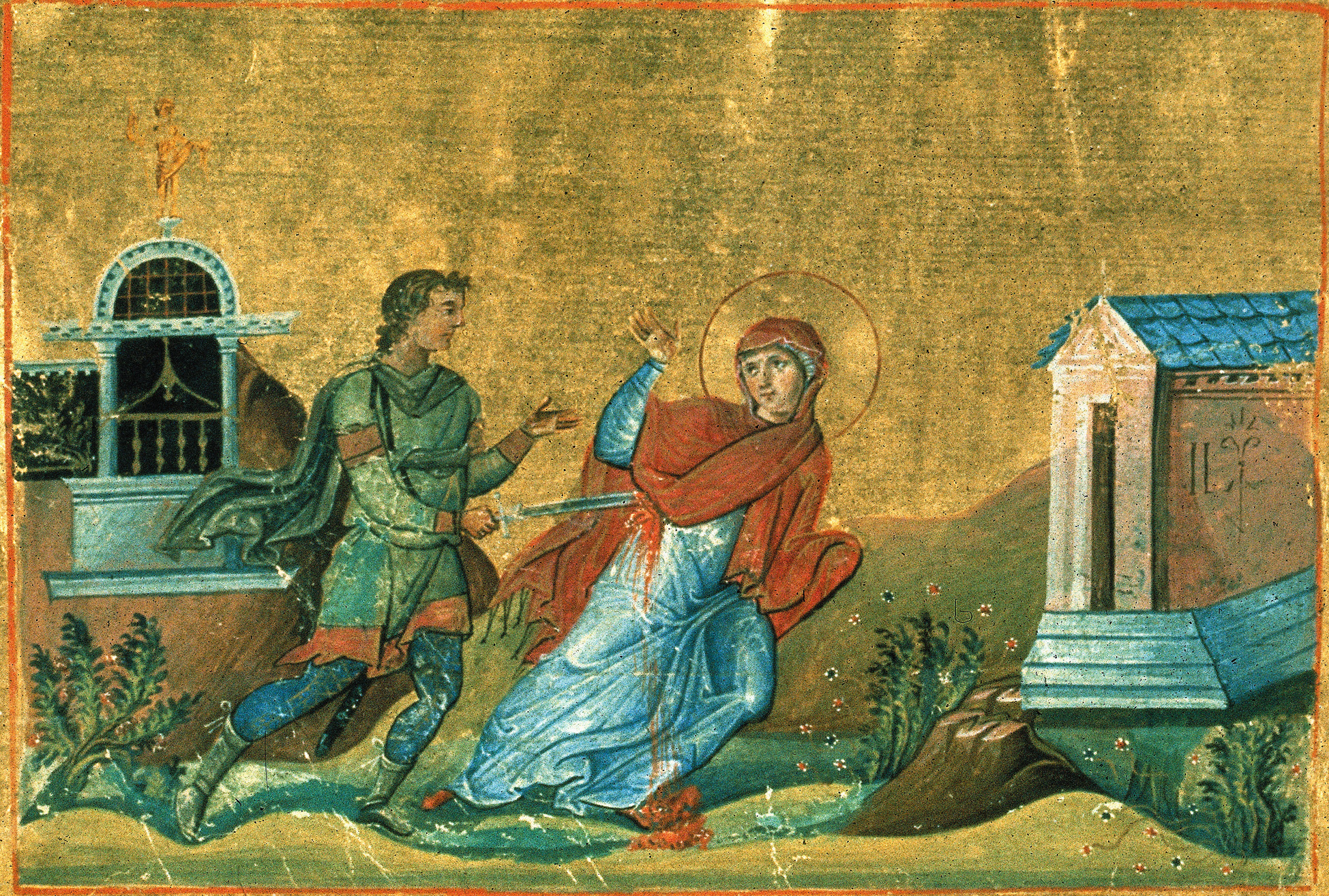
- The assault and murder of Saint Anysia by the soldier, from the Menologion of Basil II, 10th century

Martyr
- Born: 284; Thessalonica, Macedonia, Roman Empire
- Died: 304; Gate of Cassandra, Thessalonica, Macedonia, Roman Empire
- Venerated in: Eastern Orthodox Church; Roman Catholic Church
- Major shrine: Basilica of Saint Demetrios, Thessaloniki, Greece
- Feast: 30 December
- Attributes: Veil, cross

Saint Anysia of Thessalonica (Greek: Άγία Άνυσία; died c. 304) was a Christian virgin and martyr of the 4th century. She was born of pious and affluent parents who "raised her in Christian piety". They died when Anysia was young, leaving her their wealth, which she distributed to the poor, choosing to live "a strict life of fasting, vigil, and prayer".

Anysia's biography is related by Symeon the Metaphrast in a volume of his work published in 947; according to hagiographer Alban Butler, Anysia's story lacks historical confirmation. During the Diocletianic Persecution, Anysia was on her way to church, but was stopped while passing through the Cassandriote Gate by a soldier, who insisted that she tell him where she was going. In her fright, she made the sign of the cross on her forehead and when she admitted that she was a Christian, he began to force her to make sacrifices to the Roman gods. They struggled and he tried to remove her veil; she spit in his face in defiance. In anger, he killed her by running her through with his sword. The Christians buried her near the gate; when the persecution ended, they built a chapel over her grave.

Anysia is venerated in the Eastern Orthodox Church in countries under Byzantine influence; her feast day is December 30.
