= Lanzhou–Zhengzhou–Changsha pipeline =

Chinese oil pipeline

Location
- Country: China
- Province: Gansu, Hebei, Henan, Hunan
- Direction: north–south
- Start: Lanzhou
- Passes through: Zhengzhou
- To: Changsha

General information
- Type: Oil products
- Owner: PetroChina
- Construction started: 2007
- Commissioned: 2009

Technical information
- Length: 2,070 km (1,290 mi)
- Maximum discharge: 15 million tonnes

The Lanzhou–Zhengzhou–Changsha product oil pipeline is a pipeline carrying diesel and other oil products from the northwest to the central regions of China. The 2,070-kilometre (1,290 mi) pipeline starts in Lanzhou in Gansu, and runs through Zhengzhou in Henan to Changsha in Hunan. In Zhengzhou, it is linked with Jinzhou–Zhengzhou product pipeline running from Jinzhou in Liaoning to Zhengzhou.

The pipeline project was approved in 2007. The 1,188-kilometre (738 mi) long Lanzhou–Zhengzhou segment started operating on 30 March 2009. The Zhengzhou–Changsha segment is expected to be completed by the end of June 2010. The pipeline has an annual transportation capacity of 15 million tonnes. It is operated by PetroChina.

== Yellow River oil spill ==
On 30 December 2009, due to the rupturing of a segment of the pipeline, there was an oil spill in China's Yellow River. Approximately 150,000 litres (33,000 imp gal; 40,000 US gal) of diesel oil flowed down the Wei and Chishui Rivers before finally reaching the Yellow River on 4 January 2010.

== See also ==
- Kazakhstan-China oil pipeline
- Alashankou–Dushanzi Crude Oil Pipeline
