= Monastic community of Mount Athos =

Autonomous region in Greece

Coordinates: 40°17′N 24°13′E

Mount Athos Ἄθως / Ἅγιον Ὄρος
- Autonomous region
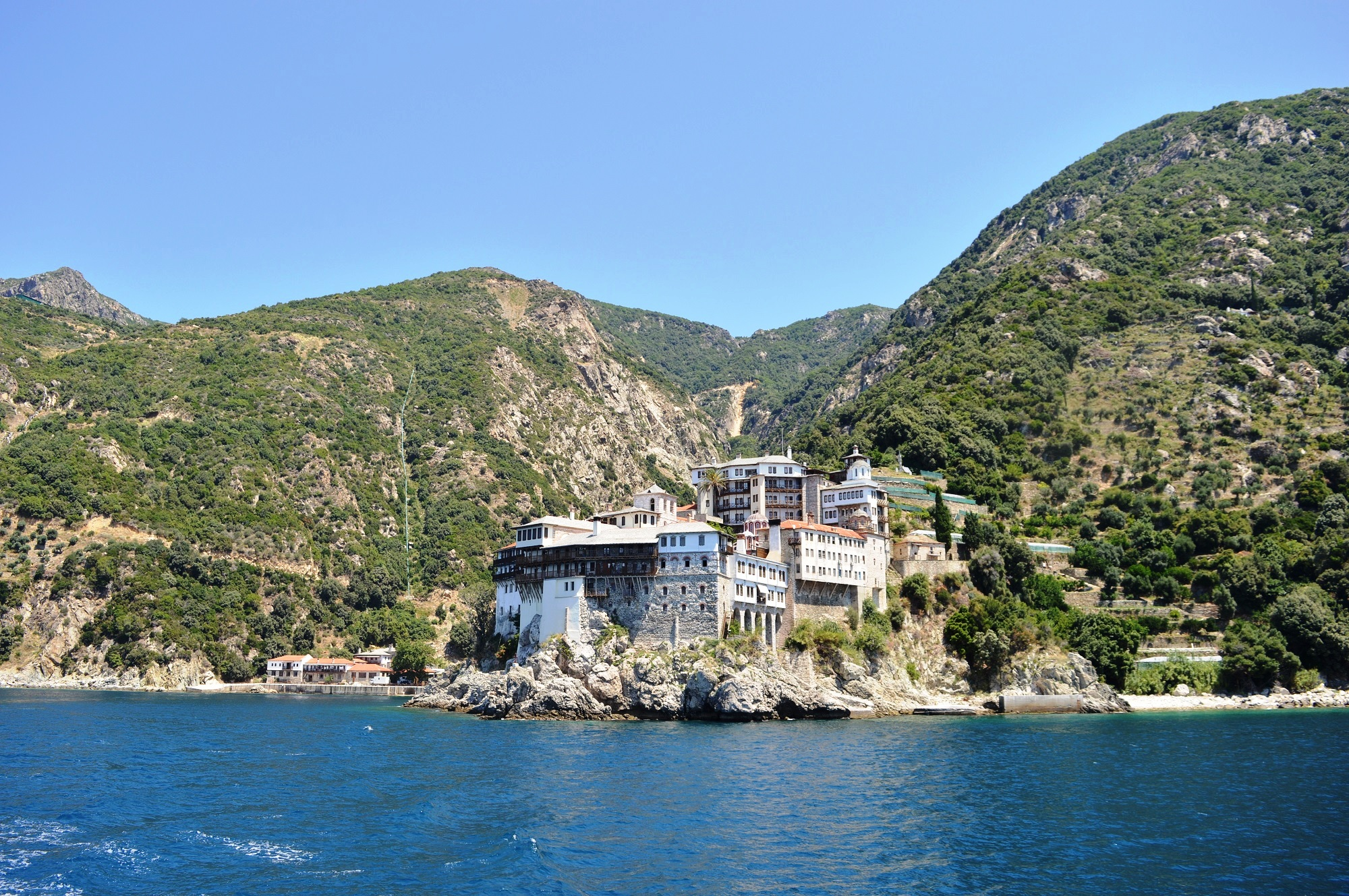
- Gregoriou Monastery, one of the 20 monasteries on Mount Athos

- Map of Greece: to the east of Chalkidiki, in red, the Athos peninsula is visible. (Location of Mount Athos within Greece)
- Sovereign state: Greece
- Capital: Karyes
- Official languages: Greek
- Common languages: Greek (main language); Bulgarian (in Zograf); Romanian (in Lakkoskiti and Prodromos); Russian (in St. Panteleimon); Serbian (in Hilandar)
- Demonym(s): Athonite; Agiorite
- Government: Monastic community
  - Ecumenical Patriarch: Bartholomew I
  - Protepistate: Elder Stefanos of Hilandar
  - Civil Administrator: Alkiviadis Stefanis

Area
  - Total: 336 km^{2} (130 sq mi)
- Highest elevation: 2,033 m (6,670 ft)

Population
  - 2021 estimate: 1,746
- Currency: Euro (€) (EUR)
- Time zone: UTC+02:00 ( EET (internationally); Byzantine time (locally))
  - Summer (DST): UTC+03:00 (EEST)
- Date format: dd.mm.yyyy
- Driving side: Right
- Calling code: +30 2377
- ISO 3166 code: GR-69

The monastic community living on the Mount Athos peninsula is an Eastern Orthodox community of monks living in Northern Greece. The community enjoys autonomous self-government within the borders of the peninsula.

The Greek Ministry of Foreign Affairs manages relations between Athos and the Government of Greece. The community includes 20 monasteries and dependent settlements. The monasteries house around 2,000 Eastern Orthodox monks from Greece and many other countries, including Eastern Orthodox countries such as Serbia, Romania, Moldova, Georgia, Bulgaria, Montenegro, North Macedonia, Ukraine and Russia, who vow to live an ascetic life at Athos, isolated from the rest of the world. The Athonite monasteries feature a rich collection of well-preserved artifacts, rare books, ancient documents, and artworks of immense historical value, and Mount Athos has been listed as a World Heritage Site since 1988.

Women are banned from Mount Athos by religious tradition.

== Administration and organization ==
According to the constitution of Greece, the territory of "[t]he Athos peninsula extending beyond Megali Vigla and constituting the region of Aghion Oros" is, "following ancient privilege", "a self-governed part of the Greek State, whose sovereignty thereon shall remain intact". The constitution also states that "[a]ll persons leading a monastic life thereon acquire Greek citizenship without further formalities, upon admission as novices or monks." The constitution states "[h]eterodox or schismatic persons" are forbidden to stay on the territory. The community consists of 20 main monasteries which constitute the Holy Community. Karyes is home to a civil administrator as the representative of the Greek state. The governor is an executive appointee.

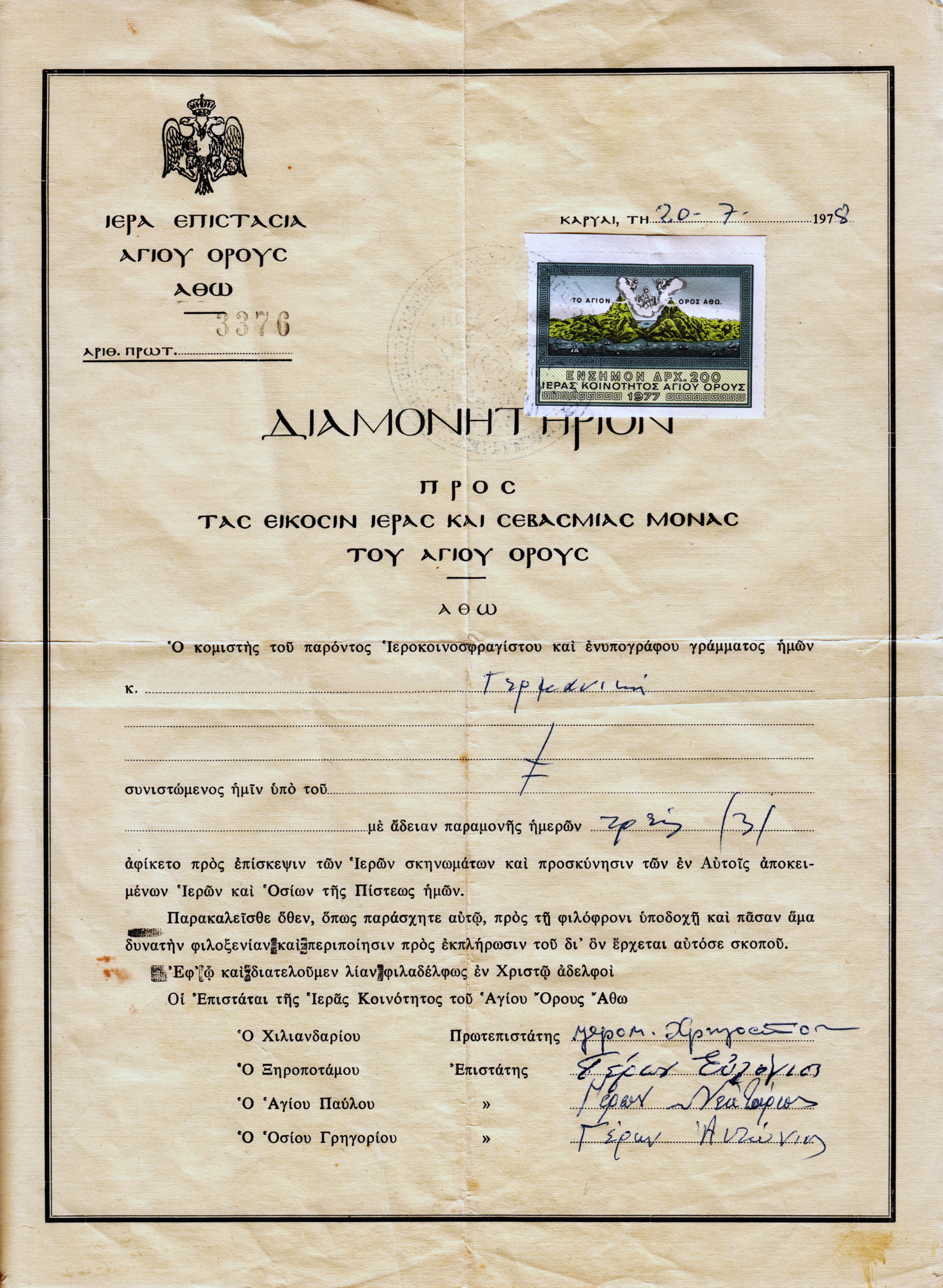
diamonitirion ("access permit") from 1978

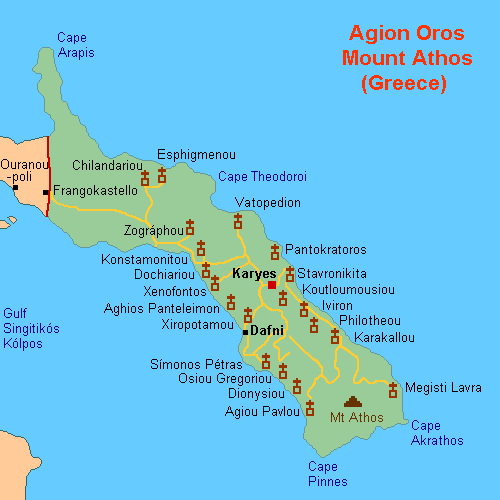
Map of the community

Although Mount Athos is legally part of the European Union like the rest of Greece, the monastic community institutions have a special jurisdiction, which was reaffirmed during the admission of Greece to the European Community (precursor to the European Union). This empowers the monastic authorities to restrict the free movement of people and goods in its territory; in particular, only men are allowed to enter.

Athos is separated from the neighbouring municipality of Aristotelis by a fence about 9 kilometres (5.6 mi) in length. Karyes is the administrative center and the seat of the synod and the civil administration.

=== Administration ===
Civil authorities are represented by the Civil Administrator of Mount Athos, appointed by presidential decree on recommendation of the Ministry of Foreign Affairs. He supervises the function of the institutions and the public order.

The monasteries on Athos are stauropegic, i.e. they are exempt from the authority of the local bishop and only report to the Ecumenical Patriarch of Constantinople. The monastic community is under the direct jurisdiction of the Ecumenical Patriarch of Constantinople Bartholomew I.

Flag of the Greek Orthodox Church used by the monastic community

Each of the 20 monasteries is administered by an archimandrite elected by the monks for life. The Convention of the Brotherhood (Γεροντία, Gerontía) is the legislative body. Each of the other establishments (sketes, cells, huts, retreats, and hermitages) is a dependency of one of the 20 monasteries and is assigned to the monks by a document called omologon (ομόλογον).

=== Monks ===
All persons leading a monastic life on Athos receive Greek citizenship upon admission as novices or monks. Laymen can visit Athos, but they need a special permit known as a diamonitirion (διαμονητήριον).

In 17 of the monasteries, the monks are predominantly ethnic Greek. The Hilandar Monastery is Serbian, the Zograf Monastery is Bulgarian, and the Agiou Panteleimonos Monastery is Russian.

Most of the sketes are also predominantly ethnic Greek; however, two sketes are Romanian. They are the coenobitic "Skētē Timiou Prodromou" (under Megistis Lavras Monastery) and the idiorrhythmic "Skētē Agiou Dēmētriou tou Lakkou", also called "Lakkoskētē" (under to the Agiou Pavlou monastery). A third skete is Bulgarian, the coenobitic "Skētē Bogoroditsa" (under the Agiou Panteleimonos monastery).

The Greek language is commonly used in all the Greek monasteries, but in some monasteries there are other languages in use: in Agiou Panteleimonos, Russian (67 monks in 2011); in Hilandar Monastery, Serbian (58); in Zographou Monastery and Skiti Bogoroditsa, Bulgarian (32); and in Timiou Prodromou and Lakkoskiti, Romanian (64).

== History ==
=== Byzantine era: the first monasteries ===
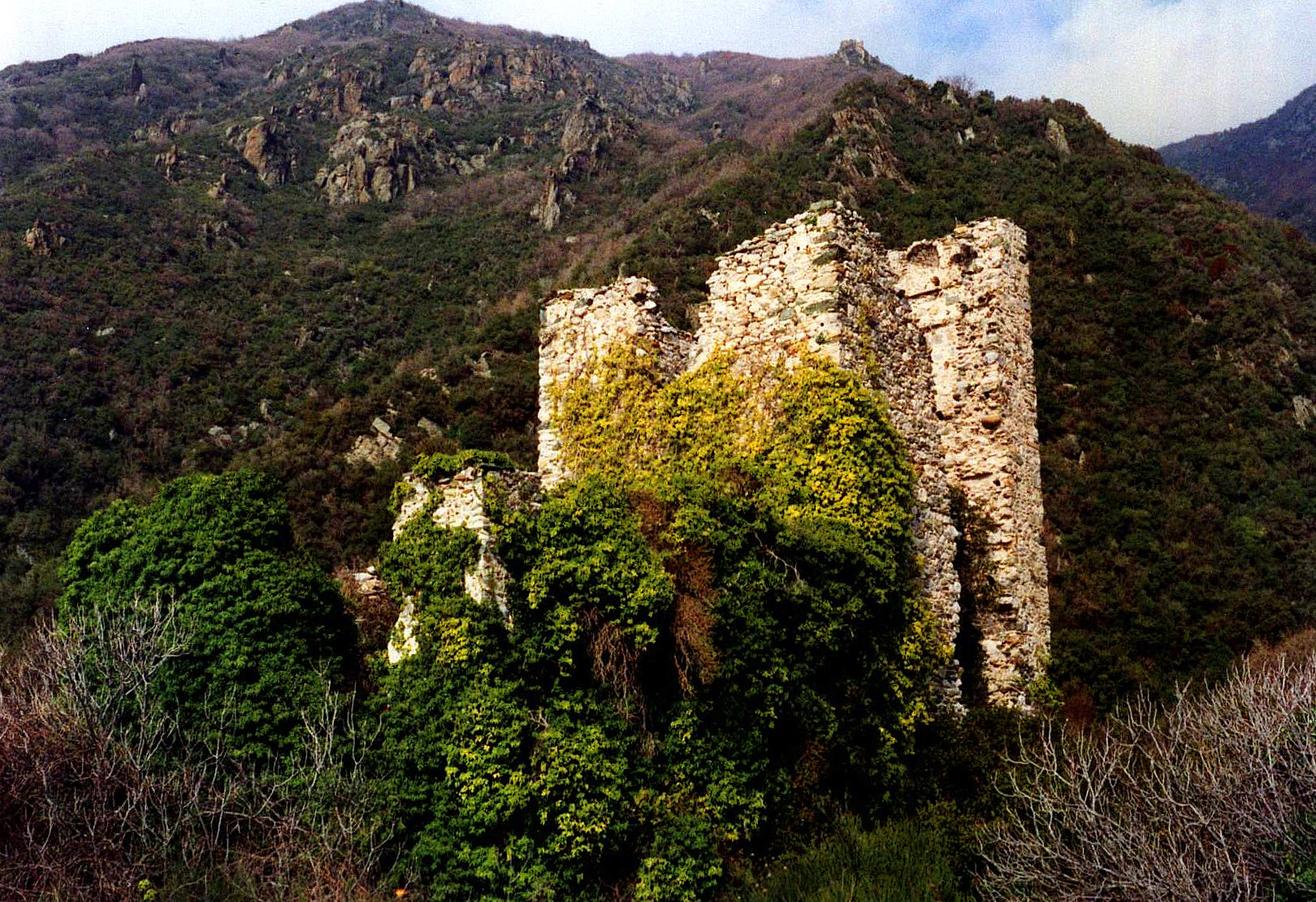
A Byzantine watch tower, protecting the dock (αρσανάς, arsanás) of Xeropotamou monastery

The chroniclers Theophanes the Confessor (end of 8th century) and Georgios Kedrenos (11th century) wrote that the 726 eruption of the Thera volcano was visible from Mount Athos, indicating that it was inhabited at the time. The historian Genesios recorded that monks from Athos participated in the seventh Ecumenical Council of Nicaea of 787. Following the Battle of Thasos in 829, Athos was deserted for some time due to the destructive raids of the Cretan Saracens. Around 860, the monk Euthymios the Younger came to Athos from Bithynia.

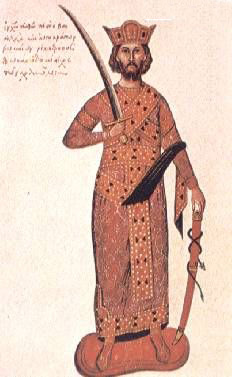
Emperor Nicephorus Phocas

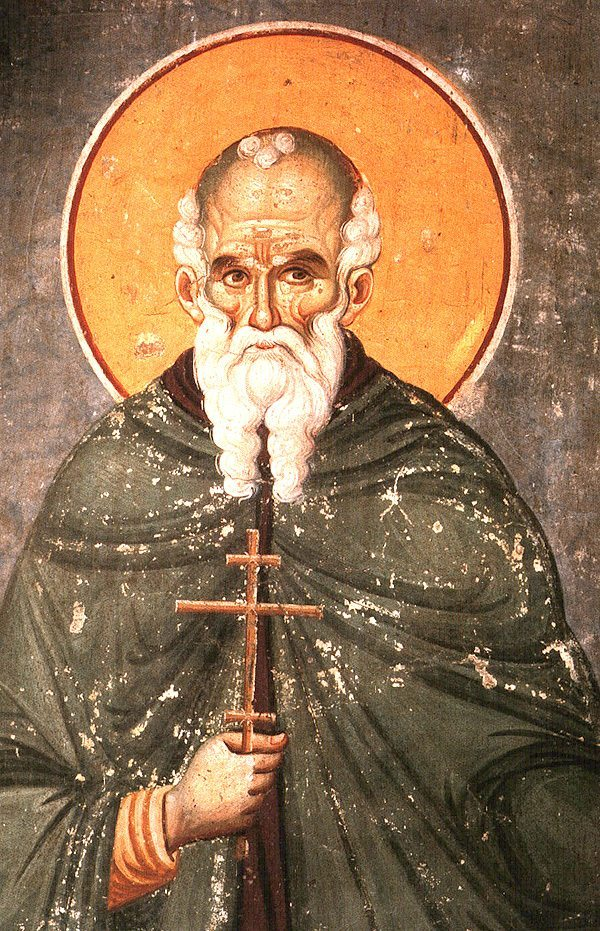
Athanasios the Athonite

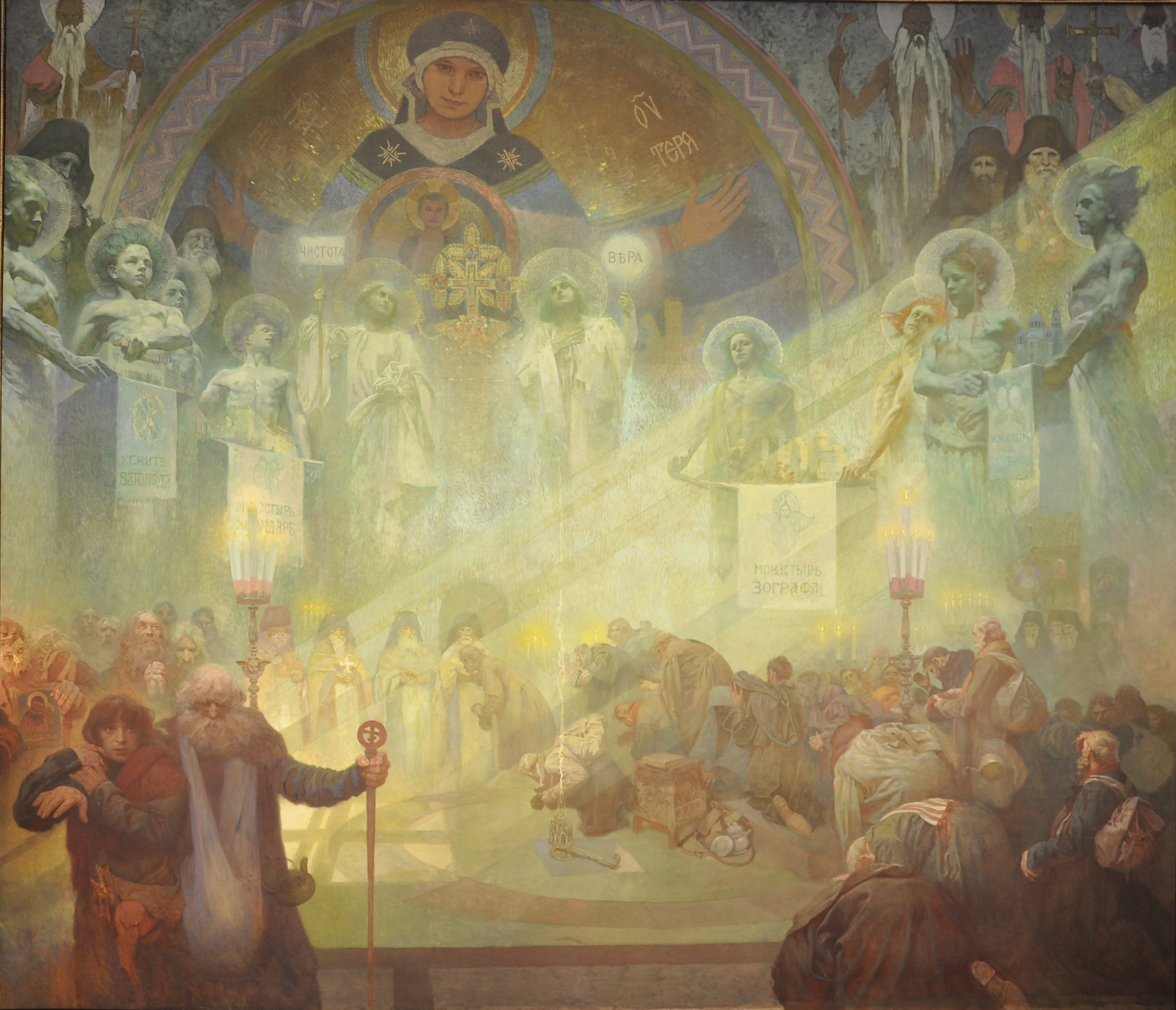
Holy Mount Athos: The Holy Mount Athos: Sheltering the Oldest Orthodox Literary Treasures (1926), by Alphonse Mucha, The Slav Epic

In 958, the monk Athanasios the Athonite (Άγιος Αθανάσιος ο Αθωνίτης) arrived on Mount Athos. In 962, he built the large central church of the Protaton in Karyes. In the next year, with the support of his friend Emperor Nicephorus Phocas, the monastery of Great Lavra was founded, still the largest and most prominent of the twenty monasteries existing today. During the following centuries, it enjoyed the protection of the Byzantine emperors, and its wealth and possessions grew considerably. Alexios I Komnenos, emperor from 1081 to 1118, gave Mount Athos complete autonomy from the Ecumenical Patriarch and the Bishop of Ierissos, and also exempted the monasteries from taxation. Furthermore, until 1312, the Protos of Karyes was directly appointed by the Byzantine Emperor.

The first charter of Mount Athos, signed in 972 by Emperor John Tzimiskes, Athanasius the Athonite, and 46 hegumenoi, is currently kept at the Protaton in Karyes. It is also known as the Tragos ('goat'), since it was written on goatskin parchment. The second charter or typikon of Mount Athos was written in September 1045 and signed by 180 hegumenoi. Emperor Constantine IX Monomachos ratified the typikon with an imperial chrysobull in June 1046. This charter was also the first official document that referred to Mount Athos as the "Holy Mountain".

From 985 to 1287, there was a Benedictine monastery on Mount Athos (between Magisti Lavra and Philotheou Karakallou) known as Amalphion after the people of Amalfi who founded it. The monastery was founded with the support of John the Iberian, a Georgian and the founder of the Iviron Monastery, and is thought to have influenced Latin Christian monasticism and piety.

The Fourth Crusade in the 13th century brought new Roman Catholic overlords, which forced the monks to complain and ask for the intervention of Pope Innocent III until the restoration of the Byzantine Empire. The peninsula was raided by Catalan mercenaries in the 14th century in the so-called Catalan vengeance, due to which the entry of people of Catalan origin was prohibited until 2005. The 14th century also saw the theological conflict over the hesychasm practised on Mount Athos and defended by Gregory Palamas (Άγιος Γρηγόριος ο Παλαμάς). In late 1371 or early 1372, the Byzantines defeated an Ottoman attack on Athos.

=== Serbian era and influences ===
Serbian lords of the Nemanjić dynasty offered financial support to the monasteries of Mount Athos, while some of them also made pilgrimages and became monks there. Stefan Nemanja helped build the Hilandar monastery on Mount Athos together with his son Archbishop Saint Sava in 1198.

From 1342 until 1372, Mount Athos was under Serbian administration. Serbian Emperor Stefan Dušan helped Mount Athos with many large donations to all monasteries. In the charter of emperor Stefan Dušan to the Monastery of Hilandar the Emperor gave to the monastery Hilandar direct rule over many villages and churches, including the church of Svetog Nikole u Dobrušti in Prizren, the church of Svetih Arhanđela in Štip, the Church of Svetog Nikole in Vranje and surrounding lands and possessions. He also gave large possessions and donations to the Karyes Hermitage of St. Sabas and the Holy Archangels in Jerusalem. Empress Helena, wife of the Emperor Stefan Dušan, was among the very few women allowed to visit and stay in Mount Athos, to protect her from the plague. She avoided breaking the ban against a woman setting foot on the mountain by not touching the ground for her entire visit, being constantly carried in a litter.

Thanks to the donations by Dušan, the Serbian monastery of Hilandar was enlarged to more than 10,000 hectares, thus having the largest possessions on Mount Athos among other monasteries, and occupying 1/3 of the area. Serbian nobleman Antonije Bagaš, together with Nikola Radonja, bought and restored the ruined Agiou Pavlou monastery between 1355 and 1365, becoming its abbot.

The time of the Serbian Empire was a prosperous period for Hilandar and other monasteries in Mount Athos, and many of them were restored, rebuilt, and significantly enlarged.

Serbian princess Mara Branković was the second Serbian woman that was granted permission to visit the area. At the end of the 15th century, five monasteries on Mount Athos had Serbian monks and were under the Serbian Prior: Docheiariou, Grigoriou, Ayiou Pavlou, Ayiou Dionysiou and Hilandar

=== Ottoman era ===
The Byzantine Empire ceased to exist in the 15th century, and the Ottoman Empire took its place.

From the account of the Russian pilgrim Isaiah, by the end of the 15th century, monasteries in Mount Athos represented monastic communities from large and diverse parts of the Balkans. Other monasteries listed by him bear no such designations; in particular, Docheiariou, Grigoriou, Ayiou Pavlou, Ayiou Dionysiou, and Chilandariou were Serbian; Karakalou and Philotheou were Albanian; Panteleïmon was Russian; Simonopetra was Bulgarian; Great Lavra, Vatopedi, Pantokratoros and Stavronikita were Greek; and Zographou, Kastamonitou, Xeropotamou, Koutloumousiou, Xenophontos, Iviron and Protaton did not bear any designation.

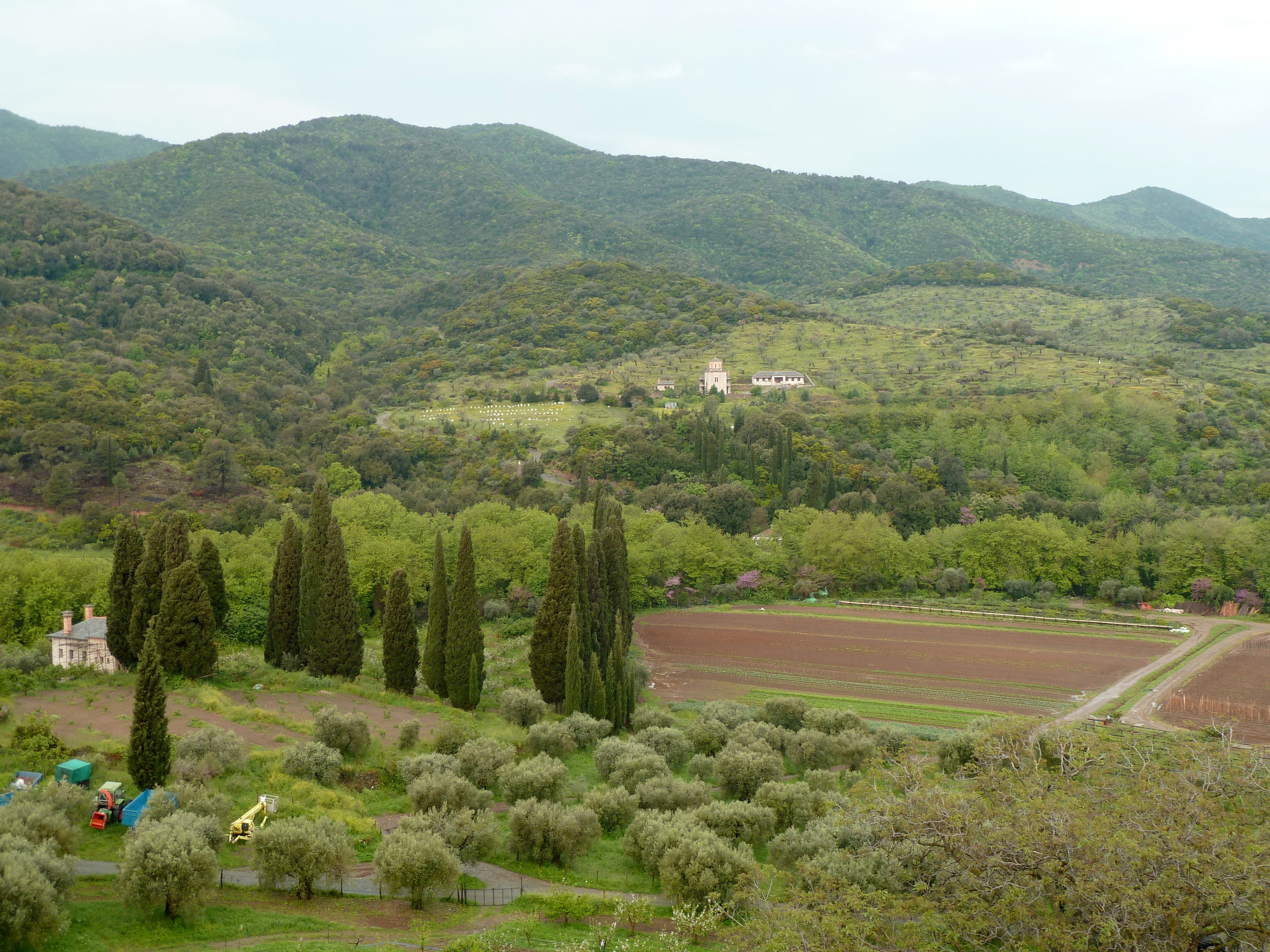
View of the area around Vatopedi monastery

Sultan Selim I was a substantial benefactor of the Xeropotamou monastery. In 1517, he issued a fatwa and a Hatt-i Sharif ("noble edict") that "the place, where the Holy Gospel is preached, whenever it is burned or even damaged, shall be erected again". He also endowed privileges to the Abbey and financed the construction of the dining area and the underground of the Abbey, as well as the renovation of the wall paintings in the central church that were completed between the years 1533 and 1541.

This new way of monastic organization was an emergency measure taken by the monastic communities to counter their harsh economic environment. Contrary to the cenobitic system, monks in idiorrhythmic communities have private property and work for themselves, bearing sole responsibility for acquiring food and other necessities; they dine separately in their cells, only meeting with other monks at church. At the same time, the monasteries' abbots were replaced by committees, and at Karyes the Protos was replaced by a four-member committee.

In 1749, with the establishment of the Athonite Academy near Vatopedi monastery, the local monastic community took a leading role in the modern Greek Enlightenment movement of the 18th century. This institution offered high level education, especially under Eugenios Voulgaris, where ancient philosophy and modern physical science were taught.

=== Late modern times ===
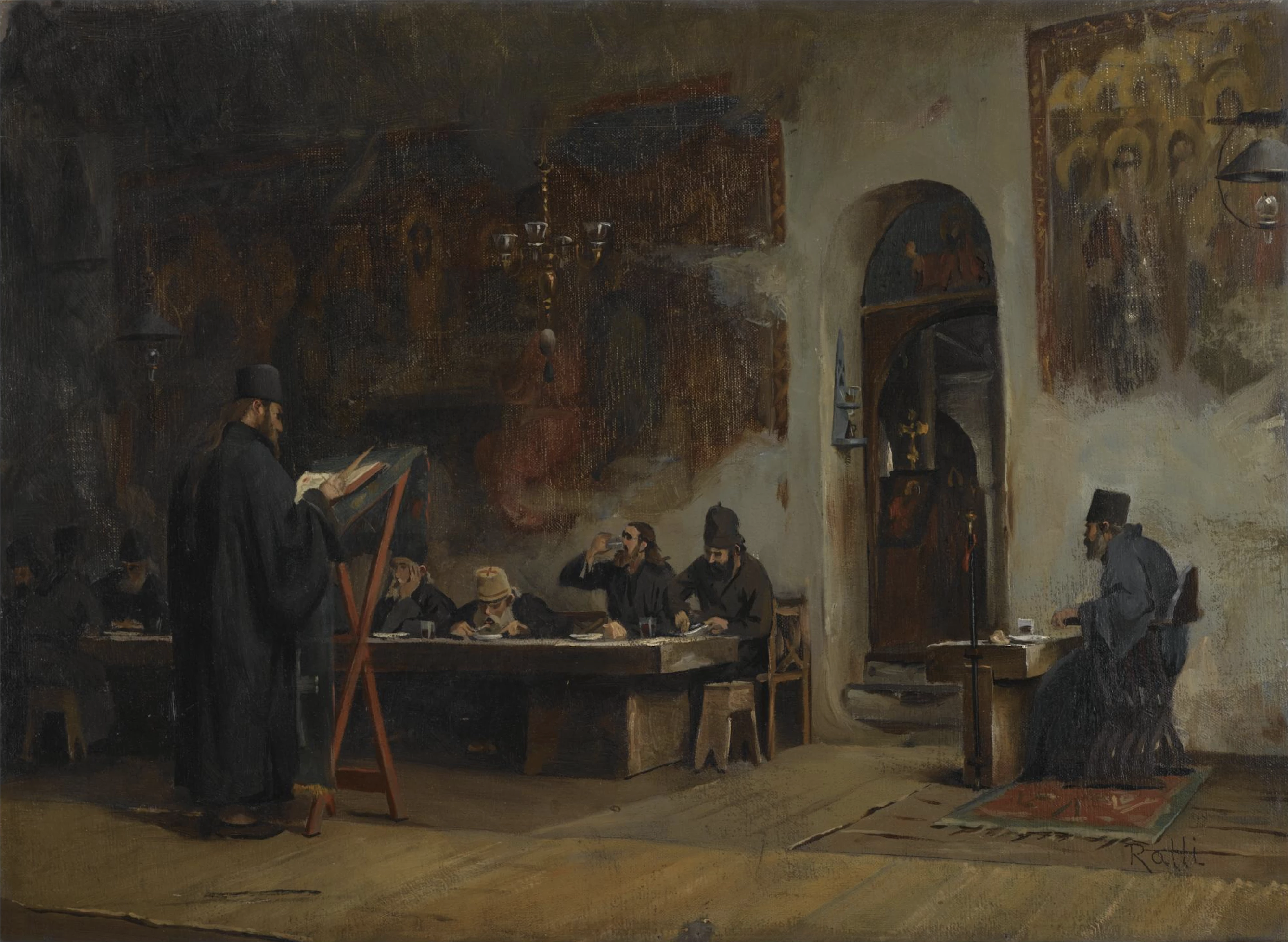
Refectory in a Greek Monastery, Mount Athos by Théodore Jacques Ralli, 1885

In modern times after the end of Ottoman rule new Serbian kings from the Obrenović dynasty and Karađorđević dynasty and the new bourgeois class resumed their support of Mount Athos.

In November 1912, during the First Balkan War, the Ottomans were forced out by the Greek Navy.

In June 1913, a small Russian fleet, consisting of the gunboat Donets and the transport ships Tsar and Kherson, delivered the archbishop of Vologda, and a number of troops to Mount Athos to intervene in the theological controversy over imiaslavie (a Russian Orthodox movement).

Maryse Choisy entered Athos in the 1920s disguised as a sailor. She later wrote about her escapade in Un mois chez les hommes (A Month with Men). In the 1930s, Aliki Diplarakou dressed as a man and snuck into Athos. Her stunt was discussed in a 13 July 1953 Time magazine article entitled "The Climax of Sin".

A monk named Mihailo Tolotos is claimed to have lived on Athos from c. 1855–1856 to 1938. On October 29, 1938, the American community newspaper Edinburg Daily Courier of Edinburg, Indiana reported that Tolotos had died at the age of 82. Reportedly, Tolotos had never seen a woman in his life, as his mother had died in childbirth and he was brought up in the monastery by the monks. His 1938 death was again mentioned in January 7, 1949, edition of Raleigh Register in an Nixon Furniture Company advertisement, saying he lived a secluded life in the monastery, suggesting he may have never left the monastery.

Photographer Ali Sami Bey with a priest in Mount Athos

Following the outbreak of World War II, Time magazine described during the German invasion of Greece in 1941 a bombing attack near Athos, "The Stukas swooped across the Aegean skies like dark, dreadful birds, but they dropped no bombs on the monks of Mount Athos". During the German occupation of Greece, the Epistassia formally asked Adolf Hitler to place Athos under his personal protection. Hitler agreed and received the title "High Protector of the Holy Mountain" (German: Hoher Protektor des heiligen Berges) from the monks. Athos was able to avoid significant damage during the war.

=== Contemporary times ===
After the war, a Special Double Assembly passed the constitutional charter of the monastic community, which was then ratified by the Greek Parliament.

In 1953, Cora Miller, an American Fulbright Program teacher, landed briefly along with two other women, stirring up a controversy among the local monks. The monasteries of Mount Athos have a history of opposing ecumenism, or movements towards reconciliation between the Orthodox Church of Constantinople and the Catholic Church. The Esphigmenou monastery is particularly outspoken in this respect, having raised black flags to protest against the meeting of Patriarch Athenagoras I of Constantinople and Pope Paul VI in 1972. Esphigmenou was subsequently expelled from the representative bodies of the Athonite Community. The conflict escalated in 2002 with Patriarch Bartholomew I of Constantinople declaring the monks of Esphigmenou an illegal brotherhood and ordering their eviction; the monks refused to be evicted, and the Patriarch ordered a new brotherhood to replace them.

The monasteries also have opposed ecumenism between the Orthodox Church of Constantinople and Oriental Orthodox Churches. Following the First and Second Agreed Statements published by the Joint Commission of the Theological Dialogue between the Orthodox Church and the Oriental Orthodox Churches in 1989 and 1990 respectively, and the subsequent Proposals for Lifting Anathemas in 1993, a committee formed by the monasteries published a responding memorandum expressing their condemnation of what they perceived to be an imminent false union with "the Non-Chalcedonians". After the dissolution of the Yugoslav Communist regime and Socialist Yugoslavia many presidents and prime ministers of Serbia visited Mount Athos.

A 2003 resolution of the European Parliament requested the lifting of the ban on women and girls for violating "the universally recognised principle of gender equality".

On 26 May 2008, five Moldovans illegally entered Greece by way of Turkey, ending up in Athos. Four of these migrants were women. The monks forgave them for trespassing and informed them that the area was forbidden to females.

In 2008 a group of Greek women contravened the 1,000-year ban on females on the mount during a protest after five monasteries laid claim to 8,100 hectares (20,000 acres) of land on the nearby Chalkidiki peninsula. About ten women jumped over the border fence and spent about 20 minutes on the monastery territory, being joined by Greek MP Litsa Ammanatidou-Paschalidou.

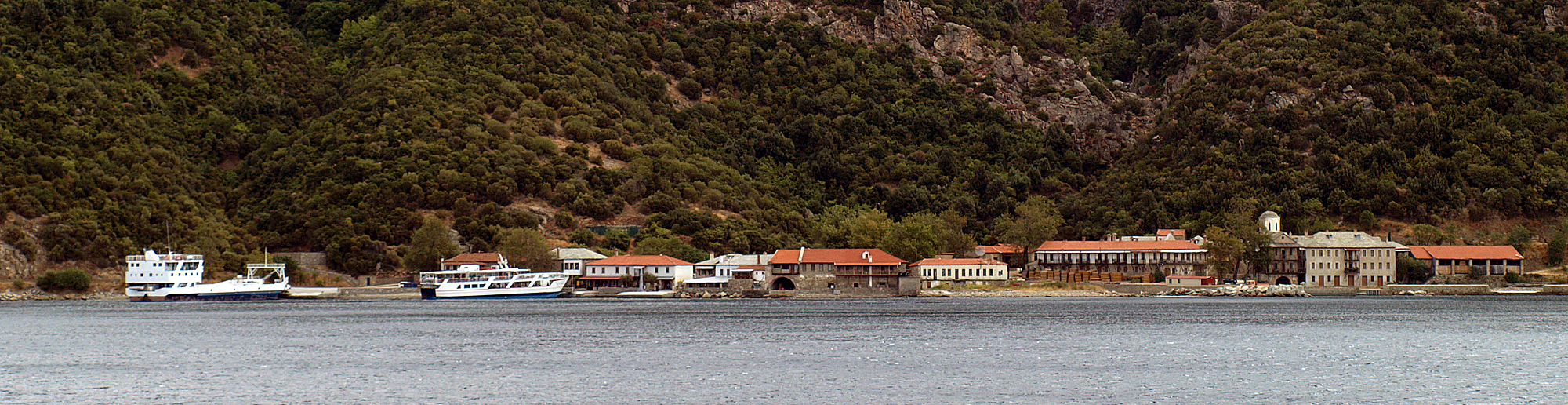
View of Dafni

In 2018, Athos became an issue in Greece-Russia relations when the Greek government denied entry to Russian clerics headed there. The media reported allegations that the Russian Federation was using Athos as a base for intelligence operations in Greece. In October 2018, the Moscow Patriarchate broke communion with the Ecumenical Patriarchate and banned its adherents from visiting sites controlled by Patriarch Bartholomew I of Constantinople, including Athos, in retaliation for his decision to grant autocephaly to the Orthodox Church of Ukraine.

In the context of the Russian invasion of Ukraine and related sanctions, in 2022 the money-laundering authority of Greece launched an investigation into the suspicious transfer of large funds from Russia to Russia-friendly monasteries and monks at Mount Athos. Several senior Russian officials had visited Mount Athos in the preceding months.

== Monastic life ==
=== Post-1970 peak ===
After reaching a low point of just 1,145 mainly elderly monks in 1971, the monasteries have been undergoing a steady and sustained renewal. By the year 2000, the monastic population had reached 1,610, with all 20 monasteries and their associated sketes receiving an infusion of mainly young, well-educated monks. In 2009, the population stood at nearly 2,000. Many younger monks possess university education and advanced skills that allow them to work on the cataloging and restoration of the Mountain's vast repository of manuscripts, vestments, icons, liturgical objects and other works of art, most of which remain unknown to the public because of their sheer volume. Projected to take several decades to complete, this restorative and archival work is funded by UNESCO and the EU, and aided by many academic institutions.

=== Monasteries ===
A pilgrim/visitor to a monastery who is accommodated in the archontariki (αρχονταρίκι) or guesthouse can follow its daily schedule: praying (services in church or in private), common dining, working (according to the duties of each monk) and rest. During religious celebrations, long vigils are typically held and the daily program is dramatically altered. The gate of the monastery closes by sunset and opens again by sunrise.

Many of the monasteries are dedicated to the Virgin Mary. Vatopedi and Philotheou are dedicated to the Annunciation, Agiou Pavlou to the Purification, Hilandar to the Presentation, and Iviron to the Dormition.

==== Cells ====
A cell is a house with a small church where 1–3 monks live under the supervision of a monastery. Usually, each cell possesses a piece of land for agricultural or other use. Each cell has to organize some activities for income.

=== Sketes ===
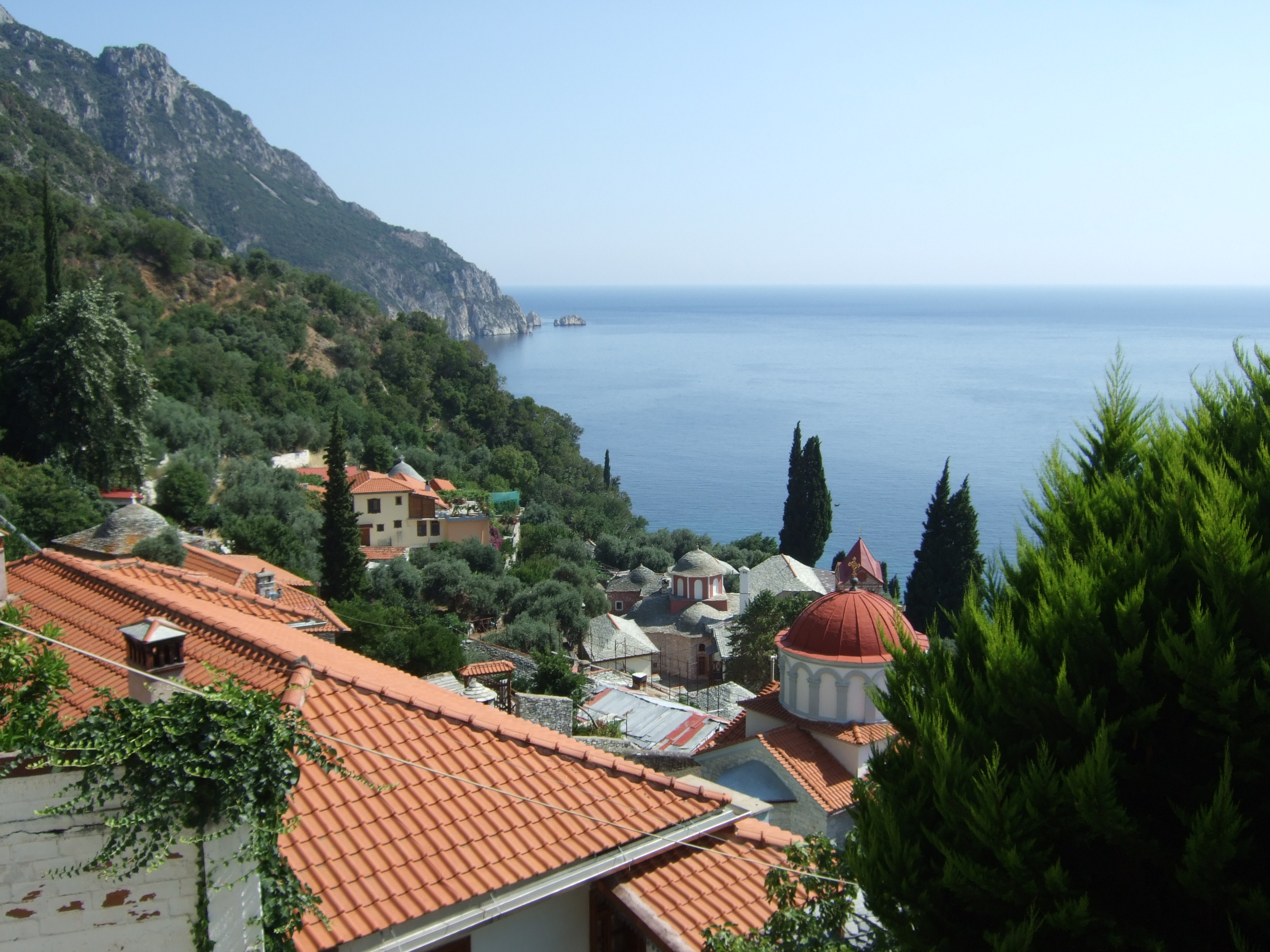
A view of Nea Skiti

Small communities of neighbouring cells have developed since the beginning of monastic life on Athos, some of which using the word "skete" (σκήτη) meaning "monastic settlement" or "lavra" (λαύρα) meaning "monastic congregation". The word "skete" is of Coptic origin and in its original form is a placename of a location in the Egyptian desert known today as Scetis.

== List of religious institutions ==
=== Twenty monasteries ===
The sovereign monasteries, in the order of their place in the Athonite hierarchy:

Great Lavra Monastery	Vatopedi Monastery	Iviron Monastery	Helandariou Monastery	Dionysiou Monastery
Μεγίστη Λαύρα	Βατοπέδι	Ιβήρων	Χιλανδαρίου; Хиландар (Serbian)	Διονυσίου
Koutloumousiou Monastery	Pantokratoros Monastery	Xeropotamou Monastery	Zografou Monastery	Docheiariou Monastery
Κουτλουμούσι	Παντοκράτορος	Ξηροποτάμου	Ζωγράφου; Зограф (Bulgarian)	Δοχειαρίου
Karakalou Monastery	Filotheou Monastery	Simonos Petras Monastery	Agiou Pavlou Monastery	Stavronikita Monastery
Καρακάλλου	Φιλοθέου	Σίμωνος Πέτρα	Αγίου Παύλου	Σταυρονικήτα
Xenophontos Monastery	Osiou Grigoriou Monastery	Esphigmenou Monastery	Agiou Panteleimonos Monastery	Konstamonitou Monastery
Ξενοφώντος	Οσίου Γρηγορίου	Εσφιγμένου	Αγίου Παντελεήμονος; Пантелеймонов (Russian)	Κωνσταμονίτου

==== Former monasteries ====
Papazôtos (1988) lists the following former 11th-century monasteries at Mount Athos, most of which are located northwest of Karyes.

English name	Greek name	Notes
Monastery of Voroskopou	μονή τοῦ ἁγίου Συμεών τοῦ Βοροσκόπου	on the northwestern coast, west of Esphigmenou Monastery
Monastery of Agios Panteleimonos of Thessaloniki	μονή τοῦ ἁγίου Παντελεήμονος τοῦ Θεσσαλονικέως	site of the current Paleomonastiro; southeast of Evangelismou Skete of Xenophontos
Monastery of Kaletzi	μονή τοῦ Καλέντζη	east of Vatopedi; present-day Kolitsou (Κολιτσού)
Monastery of Kalyka	μονή τοῦ Σωτῆρος Χριστοῦ τοῦ Κάλυκα	on the northwestern coast, west of Esphigmenou Monastery; just west of Voroskopou
Monastery of Katzari	μονή τοῦ Σωτῆρος Χριστοῦ τοῦ Κατζάρη	east of Evangelismou Skete of Xenophontos
Monastery of Xylourgou	μονή τῆς Ὑπεραγίας Θεοτόκου τοῦ Ξυλουργού	southeast of Agios Dimitrios Skete (of Vatopedi); northwest of Pantokratoros Monastery
Monastery of Agios Prokopios	μονή τοῦ ἁγίου Προκοπίου	southwest of Agios Dimitrios Skete (of Vatopedi)
Monastery of Saravari	μονή τοῦ Σωτῆρος Χριστοῦ τοῦ Σαράβαρη	southeast of Karyes, on the old route to Iviron Monastery
Monastery of Trochala	μονή τοῦ Τρόχαλα	south of Agios Dimitrios Skete (of Vatopedi)
Monastery of Agios Hypatios	μονή τοῦ ἁγίου Ὑπατίου	northeast of Konstamonitou Monastery
Monastery of Falakrou	μονή τοῦ Ἀσωμάτου τοῦ Φαλακροῦ	near Bogoroditsa Skete; present-day Faraklou (Φαρακλού)
Monastery of Agios Philippos	μονή τοῦ ἁγίου Φιλίππου	north of the Megali Giovanitsa port (arsanas) of Hilandar Monastery

Other former monasteries include Amalfinon Monastery, a Latin monastery, and the Monastery of Zelianos, a Slavic (Bulgarian) monastery located near Xenophontos Monastery and Old Rosiko.

=== Sketes ===
A skete is a community of Christian hermits following a monastic rule, allowing them to worship in comparative solitude, while also affording them a level of mutual practical support and security. There are two kinds of sketes in Mount Athos. A coenobitic skete follows the style of monasteries. An idiorrhythmic skete follows the style of a small village: it has a common area of worship (a church), with individual hermitages or small houses around it, each one for a small number of occupants. The twelve main official sketes on Mount Athos are:

Skete	Type	Monastery	Alternative names / notes
Agias Annas Αγίας Άννας	Idiorrhythmic	Megistis Lavras	(= Saint Anne) Agiánna
Agias Triados or Kafsokalyvíon Αγίας Τριάδος ή Καυσοκαλυβίων	Idiorrhythmic	Megistis Lavras	(= Holy Trinity) Kafsokalývia (= "burned huts")
Timiou Prodromou Τιμίου Προδρόμου	Coenobitic	Megistis Lavras	(= Holy Fore-runner, i.e. St John the Baptist) Prodromu, Sfântul Ioan Botezătorul – Romanian
Agiou Andrea Αγίου Ανδρέα	Coenobitic	Vatopediou	(= Saint Andrew) Also known as Saray (Σαράι)
Skiti Agiou Dimitriou of Vatopedi Αγίου Δημητρίου	Idiorrhythmic	Vatopediou	(= Saint Demetrius) Vatopediní
Skiti Timiou Prodromou of Iviron Τιμίου Προδρόμου Ιβήρων	Idiorrhythmic	Iviron	(= Holy Forerunner, i.e. St John the Baptist) Ivirítiki
Agiou Panteleimonos Αγίου Παντελεήμονος	Idiorrhythmic	Koutloumousiou	(= Saint Panteleimon/Pantaleon) Koutloumousianí
Profiti Ilia Προφήτη Ηλία	Coenobitic	Pantokratoros	(= Prophet Elijah)
Theotokou or Nea Skiti Θεοτόκου ή Νέα Σκήτη	Idiorrhythmic	Agiou Pavlou	(= Of God-Bearer or New Skete)
Agiou Dimitriou tou Lakkou or Lakkoskiti Αγίου Δημητρίου του Λάκκου ή Λακκοσκήτη	Idiorrhythmic	Agiou Pavlou	(= Saint Demetrius of the Ravine or Ravine-Skete) Lacu, Sfântul Dumitru – Romanian
Evangelismou tis Theotokou Ευαγγελισμού της Θεοτόκου	Idiorrhythmic	Xenophontos	(= Annunciation of Theotokos) Xenofontiní
Bogoroditsa Βογορόδιτσα	Coenobitic	Agiou Panteleimonos	

Other settlements and hermitages at Mount Athos that are sometimes referred to as "sketes" include Nea Tivaida (Νέα Θηβαΐδα; a Russian skete), Little St. Anne's Skete, and the Skete of St. Basil (Άγιος Βασίλειος; a Greek-speaking skete). However, none of them are officially considered to sketes by the administration of Mount Athos. Former sketes include Rosiko (Ρωσικό) and Chourmitsa (Μετόχι Χουρμίτσας) (both Russian sketes).

=== Settlements ===
The main settlements are:

- Karyes (main administrative center)
- Dafni (main port)

Other smaller settlements are:

- Vigla
- Agios Nilos
- Kerasia
- Karoulia
- Katounakia
- Kafsokalyvia
- Vouleftiria
- Provata
- Morfonou
- Kapsala

== Law ==
=== Visitors ===
Daily visitors to Mount Athos are restricted to 100 lay Eastern Orthodox Christian and 10 non-Eastern Orthodox male pilgrims, and all are required to obtain a special entrance permit from the Mount Athos Pilgrims' Bureau called the diamonitirion (διαμονητήριον). Pilgrims pick up the permit from the Pilgrims' Bureau office in Thessaloniki and then present it at Ouranopoli or Ierissos before boarding the ferry to Mount Athos. This permit is valid for three days unless a monastery requests permission to extend it, or if an extension application is submitted at Karyes. Eastern Orthodox clergy are required to obtain a special entrance permit from the Patriarchate of Constantinople. Only men are permitted to visit the territory, which is called the "Garden of Virgin Mary" (Greek: Περιβόλι της Παναγιάς, romanized: Perivoli tis Panagias) by the monks. Residents on the peninsula must be men aged 18 and over who are members of the Eastern Orthodox Church and also either monks or workers. Until the year 2000, the monks of Mount Athos prohibited entry to any Catalan citizens due to the events sparked by the Catalan Company, a mercenary army, in the 14th century.

Visitors from holy orders (Orthodox monks and clerics) must also seek written permission (evlogia) from the Ecumenical Patriarchate of Constantinople in Istanbul.

There are two types of diamonitirions:

- The genikon diamonitirion or "general permit" is issued by the Pilgrims' Bureau (officially known as the Holy Executive οf the Holy Mount Athos - Pilgrims' Bureau) in Thessaloniki, located on Egnatia Street near the Arch of Galerius. This permit gives the right to stay in Mount Athos for 3 nights (4 days including the day of departure). It can be extended in Karyes if necessary, generally for an additional two nights. This permit is limited to 100 Orthodox visitors and 10 non-Orthodox visitors per day. Pilgrims can apply up to 6 months in advance. High season is typically during July, August, Christmas, Great Lent, and Easter, and slots may fill up a few months in advance.
- The idikon diamonitirion or "individual permit" (Greek: ειδικον διαμονητήριον) is issued by the monastery itself for a period usually from 4 days to 1 year, officially with the right to reside only in the monastery indicated in the invitation (although in practice, a pilgrim with this permission may actually also stay overnight in any other monastery).

As part of measures to fight the COVID-19 pandemic, visits to Mount Athos were suspended from 19 March 2020 until 11 May 2021.

=== Prohibition on entry of women ===
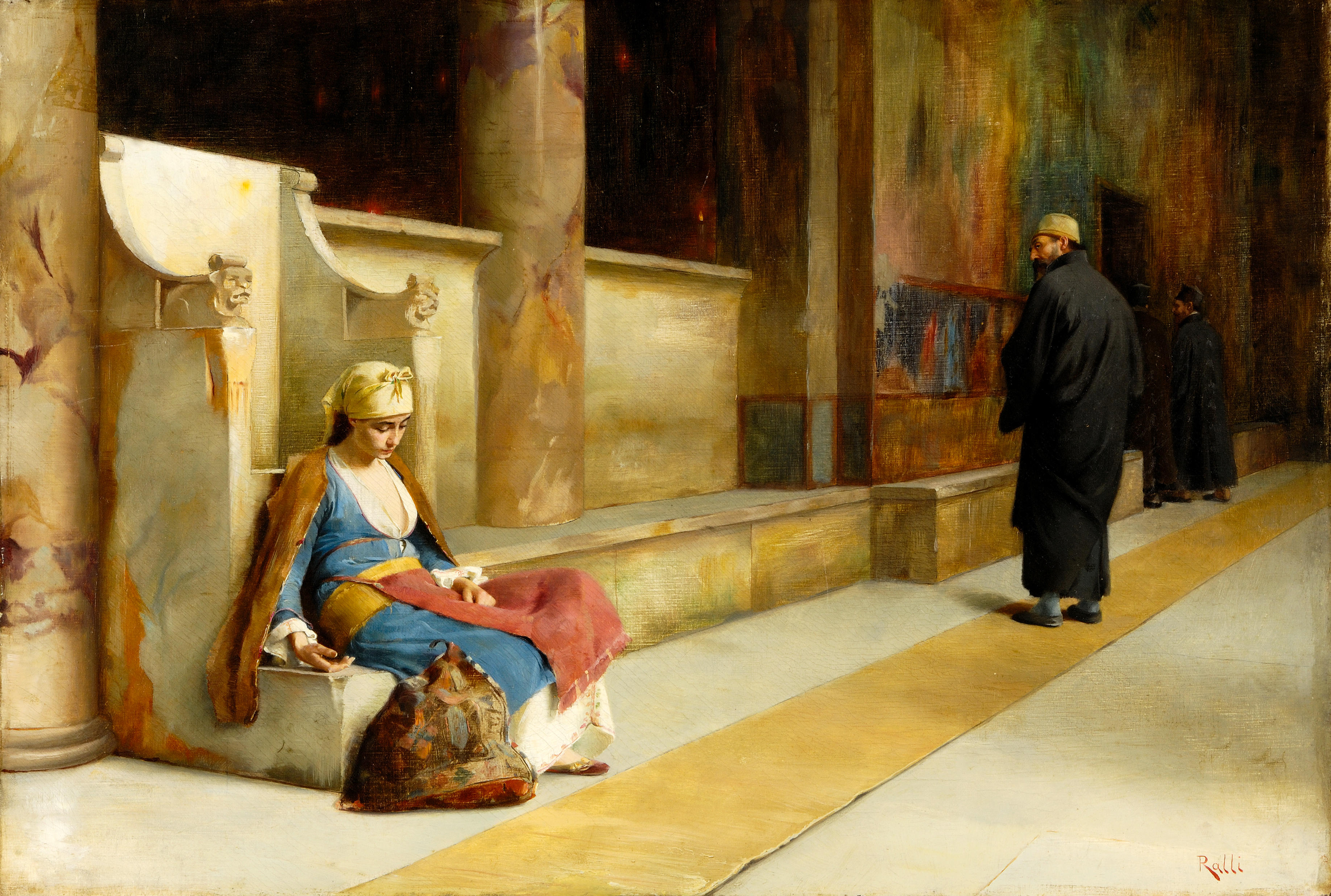
Resting in a Greek Monastery by Théodore Jacques Ralli, 1873–1909, women resting in a Greek monastery with the gaze of an Orthodox priest.

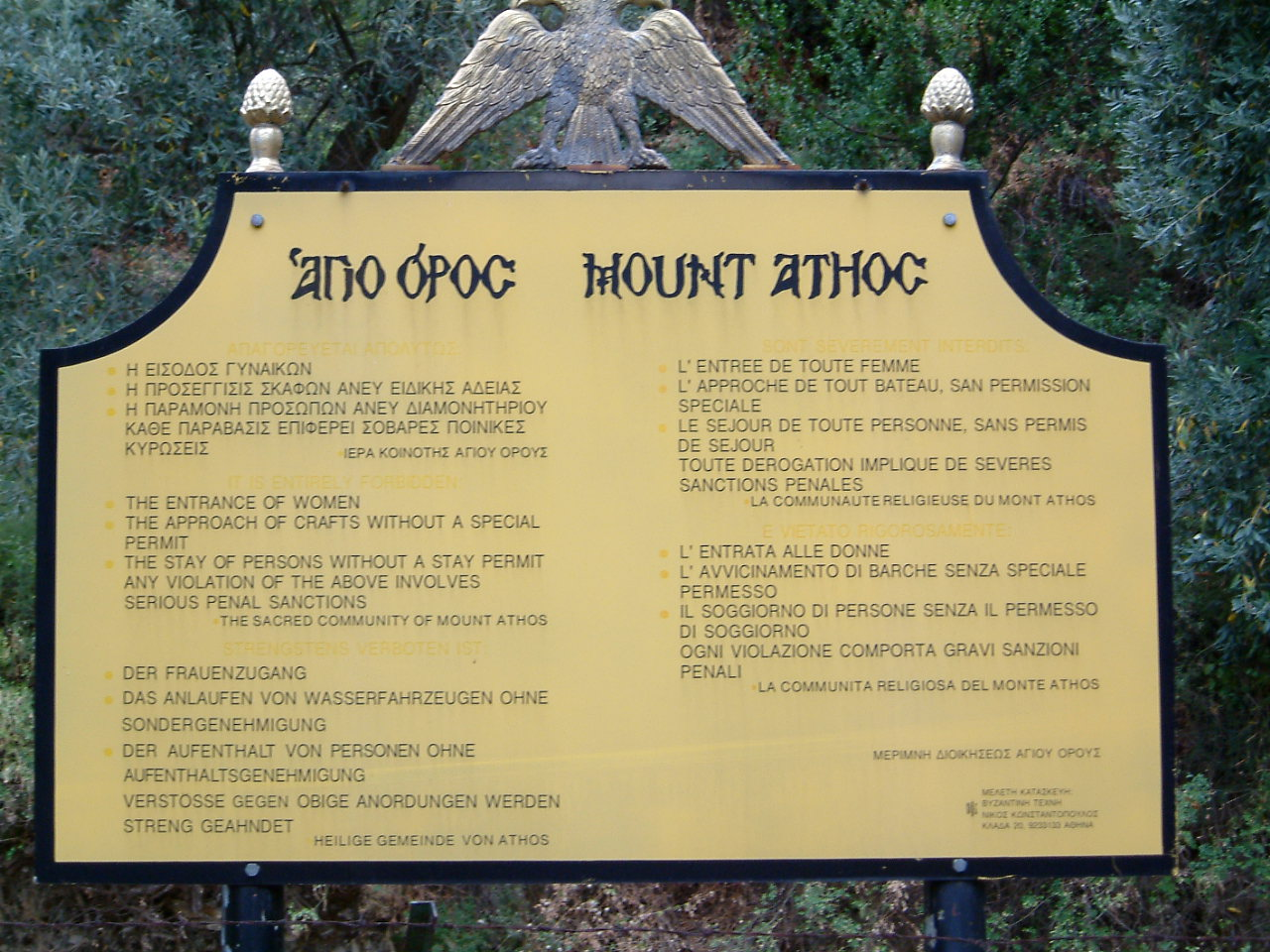
Sign at entrance to Mount Athos

The monastic community bans women and female animals from entry in what is called an avaton (Άβατον). This intended to make living in celibacy easier for men who have chosen to do so. The main goal is to ensure celibacy, but also because the Virgin Mary alone represents her gender on Mount Athos, which is dedicated to her glory.

The ban was officially proclaimed by several emperors, including Constantine Monomachos, in a chrysobull of 1046.

Female domestic animals such as cows or sheep are also barred, the only exception being cats due to their mousing abilities.

==== Status in the European Union ====
As part of an EU member state, Mount Athos is part of the European Union and, for the most part, subject to EU law. While outside the EU's Value Added Tax area, Mount Athos is within the Schengen Area. A declaration attached to Greece's accession treaty to the Schengen Agreement states that Mount Athos's "special status" should be taken into account in the application of the Schengen rules. The monks strongly objected to Greece joining the Schengen Area based on fears that the EU would be able to end the centuries-old prohibition on the admittance of women. The prohibition is unchanged and a special permit is required to enter the peninsula. The monks were also concerned that the agreement could affect their traditional right to offer sanctuary to men from Orthodox countries such as Russia. Such monks do nowadays need a Greek visa and permission to stay, even if that is given generously by the Greek ministry, based on requests from Athos.

== See also ==
- Meteora
- Okinoshima (Fukuoka)
- Footpaths of Mount Athos
- Antiathonas
- Byzantine Empire
- Eastern Orthodox Church
- Friends of Mount Athos
- Hesychasm
- History of the Byzantine Empire
- List of historic Greek countries and regions
- New Athos
- Postage stamps and postal history of Mount Athos
- Sovereign State of the Bektashi Order

== Bibliography ==
- Holy Mountain. Stone Arched Bridges and Aqueducts (ISBN 978-618-00-0827-2) by Frangiscos Martinos. Edited by Dimitri Michalopoulos (Athens, 2019).
- Mount Athos ISBN 960-213-075-X by Sotiris Kadas. An illustrated guide to the monasteries and their history (Athens 1998). With many illustrations of the Byzantine art treasures on Mount Athos.
- Athos The Holy Mountain by Sydney Loch. Published 1957 & 1971 (Librairie Molho, Thessaloniki). Loch spent most of his life in the Byzantine tower at Ouranopolis, close to Athos, and describes his numerous visits to the Holy Mountain.
- The Station: Athos: Treasures and Men by Robert Byron. First published 1931, reprinted with an introduction by John Julius Norwich, 1984.
- Dare to be Free ISBN 0-330-10629-5 by Walter Babington Thomas. Offers insights into the lives of the monks of Mt Athos during World War II, from the point of view of an escaped POW who spent a year on the peninsula evading capture.
- Blue Guide: Greece ISBN 0-393-30372-1, pp. 600–03. Offers history and tourist information.
- Mount Athos: Renewal in Paradise ISBN 978-0300093537, by Graham Speake. Published by Yale University Press in 2002. An extensive book about Athos in the past, the present and the future. Includes valuable tourist information. Features numerous full-colour photographs of the peninsula and daily life in the monasteries. 2nd edition published by Denise Harvey in 2014, which includes revisions, updates, and a new chapter documenting the changes that have occurred in the twelve years since its first publication.
- From the Holy Mountain by William Dalrymple. ISBN 0-8050-6177-0. Published 1997.
- Ivanov, Emil: Das Bildprogramm des Narthex im Rila-Kloster in Bulgarien unter besonderer Berücksichtigung der Wasserweihezyklen auf dem Athos, Diss., Erlangen, 2002.
- Ivanov, Emil: Apokallypsedarstellungen in der nachbyzantinischen Kunst, in: Das Münster, 3, 2002, 208–217.
- Encounters on the Holy Mountain: Stories from Mount Athos ISBN 978-2-503-58911-4, P. Howorth, C. Thomas (eds). Published by Brepols in 2020.
- Leigh Fermor, Patrick: The Broken Road. The final volume of his original trilogy, edited by Colin Thubron and Artemis Cooper, has an excellent descriptive tour around each of the main Monasteries, from his visit in January-February 1935.
- Fotić, Aleksandar (1994). "The Official Explanations for the Confiscation and Sale of Monasteries (Churches) and their Estates at the Time of Selim II". Turcica: Revue d'études turques. 26: 34–54.
- Fotić, Aleksandar (2010). "Athonite Travelling Monks and the Ottoman Authorities (16th - 18th Centuries)". Perspectives on Ottoman Studies: Papers from the 18th Symposium of the International Committee of Pre-Ottoman and Ottoman Studies (CIEPO). Berlin: LIT Verlag. pp. 157–165.
- "Mount Athos". National Geographic. Vol. 164, no. 6. December 1983. pp. 738–766. ISSN 0027-9358. OCLC 643483454.
- Dales, Douglas; Speake, Graham (2020). The life of prayer on Mount Athos. Oxford. ISBN 978-1-78997-521-5. OCLC 1153341087.
- Mileusnić, Slobodan (2000) [1989]. Sveti Srbi (in Serbian). Novi Sad: Prometej. ISBN 8676394784. OCLC 44601641.
- Speake, Graham (2018). A history of the Athonite Commonwealth : the spiritual and cultural diaspora of Mount Athos. New York. ISBN 978-1-108-34922-2. OCLC 1041501028.
- Speake, Graham; Kallistos, Bishop of Diokleia (2015). Spiritual guidance on Mount Athos. Oxford. ISBN 978-3-0353-0693-4. OCLC 904800265.
- Speake, Graham; Ware, Kallistos (2012). Mount Athos : Microcosm of the Christian East. Oxford: Lang, Peter, AG, Internationaler Verlag der Wissenschaften. ISBN 978-3-0353-0233-2. OCLC 823378976.
- Speake, Graham (2014). Mount Athos : renewal in paradise. Limni, Evia, Greece. ISBN 978-960-7120-34-2. OCLC 903320491.
- Gothóni, René; Speake, Graham (2008). The monastic magnet : roads to and from Mount Athos. Bern: Peter Lang. ISBN 978-3-03911-337-8. OCLC 230209474.
- Conomos, Dimitri E.; Speake, Graham (2005). Mount Athos, the sacred bridge : the spirituality of the Holy Mountain. Oxford: Peter Lang. ISBN 3-03910-064-5. OCLC 67924540.
