= Postage stamps and postal history of Mount Athos =

This is a survey of the postage stamps and postal history of Mount Athos.

== Russian post office and stamps ==
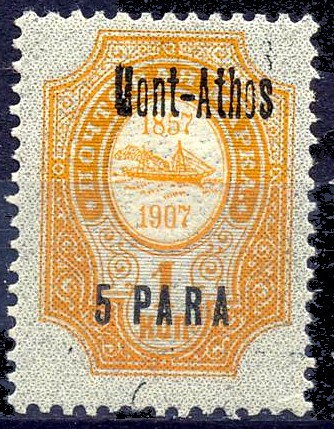
ROPIT stamp for Mount Athos

A Russian post office was established at Karyai in the last years of the 19th century. The post office used Russian stamps for the Levant. A series of stamps overprinted "Mont-Athos" was issued in 1910.

== Greek stamp issues ==
In accordance with the agreement concluded by the Hellenic Postal Service with the Holy Kinot of Mount Athos in May 2008, postage stamps are issued for use in the two post offices located in Mount Athos, in Karyai, the seat of administration, and in the port of Dafni at the foot of the mountain.

== Contemplated WW1 allied postage stamp issue ==
In the winter of 1915–1916 the Allied forces were considering occupation of the Holy Mountain. In anticipation of this they prepared a set of stamps which were intended for issue on 25 January 1916 for the use of the Governing body of the Monastic Community.

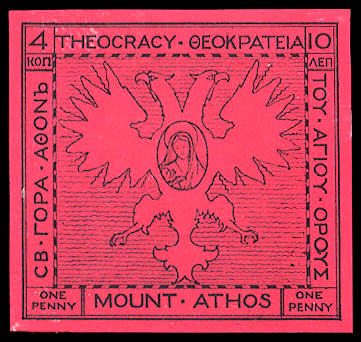
Essay of Harry Pirie-Gordon

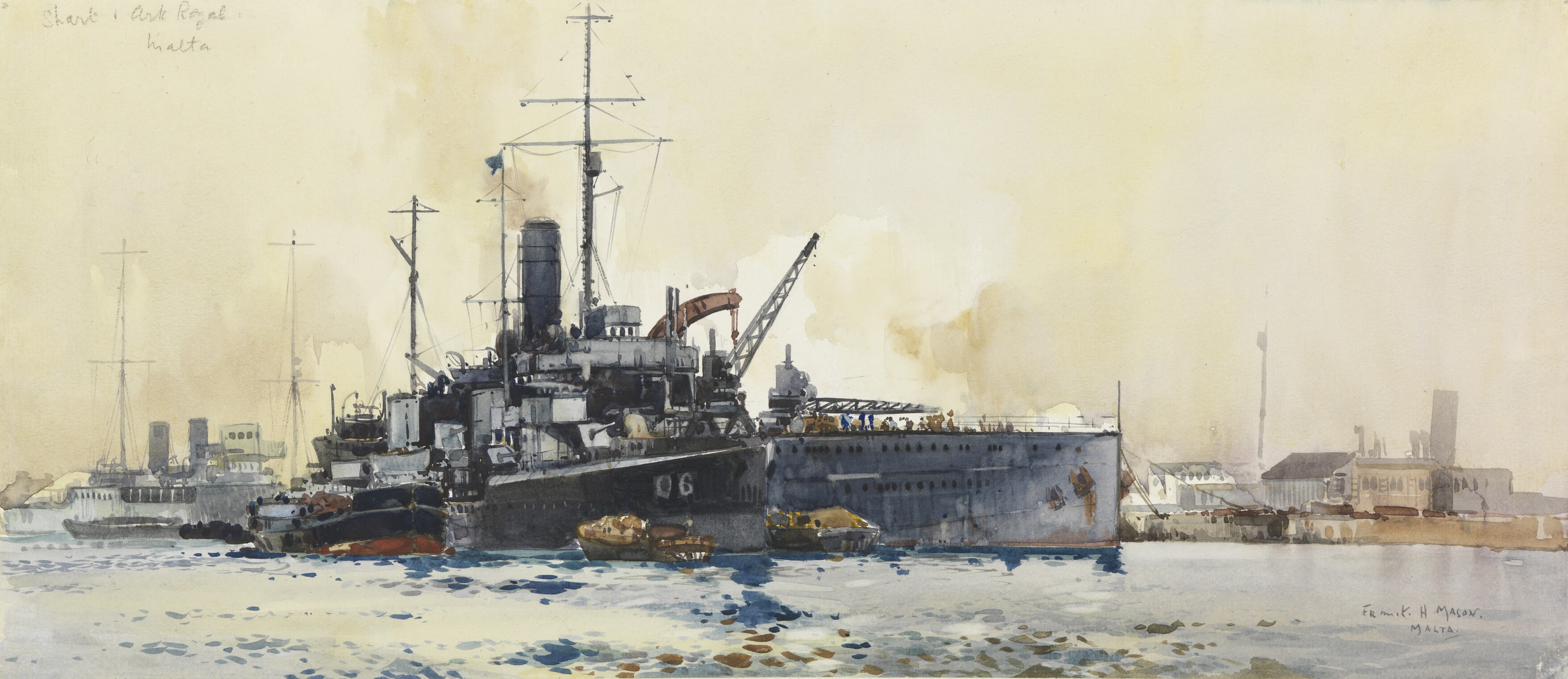
HMS Ark Royal

These stamps were produced in sheets of 12 (3 rows of 4), on board the seaplane carrier HMS Ark Royal. Six values were produced, ranging up to one shilling, and all were printed in black but on various different paper types.

The design of these stamps consisted of a square border with the name MOUNT ATHOS at the bottom in English, the left in Russian and on the right in Greek. At the top was inscribed THEOCRACY. The denomination appeared at each corner with the English in the lower corners, Greek in the top left and Russian in the top right. The inner section showed a double headed Byzantine eagle with the effigy of the Madonna and Child in an oval on its breast.

These stamps have no official status but fall into the category of prepared for use but not issued.

== Greek 1916 overprint ==
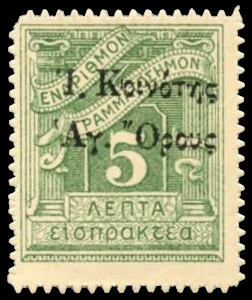
Postage due stamp prepared, but not issued by Greek administration for Mount Athos, 1916

For political reasons in 1916 the Greek Government overprinted Greek "Campaign 1912" and postage due (1913 issue) stamps, as well as postal stationery, with the inscription "Ι. Κοινότης Αγ. Όρους" (Holy Community of Sacred Mountain). The decision was reversed before the stamps were officially issued.

== See also ==
- Postage stamps and postal history of Greece
- Postage stamps and postal history of Crete
- Postage stamps and postal history of Epirus
