= Esphigmenou =

Eastern Orthodox monastery, Mount Athos

- Εσφιγμένου
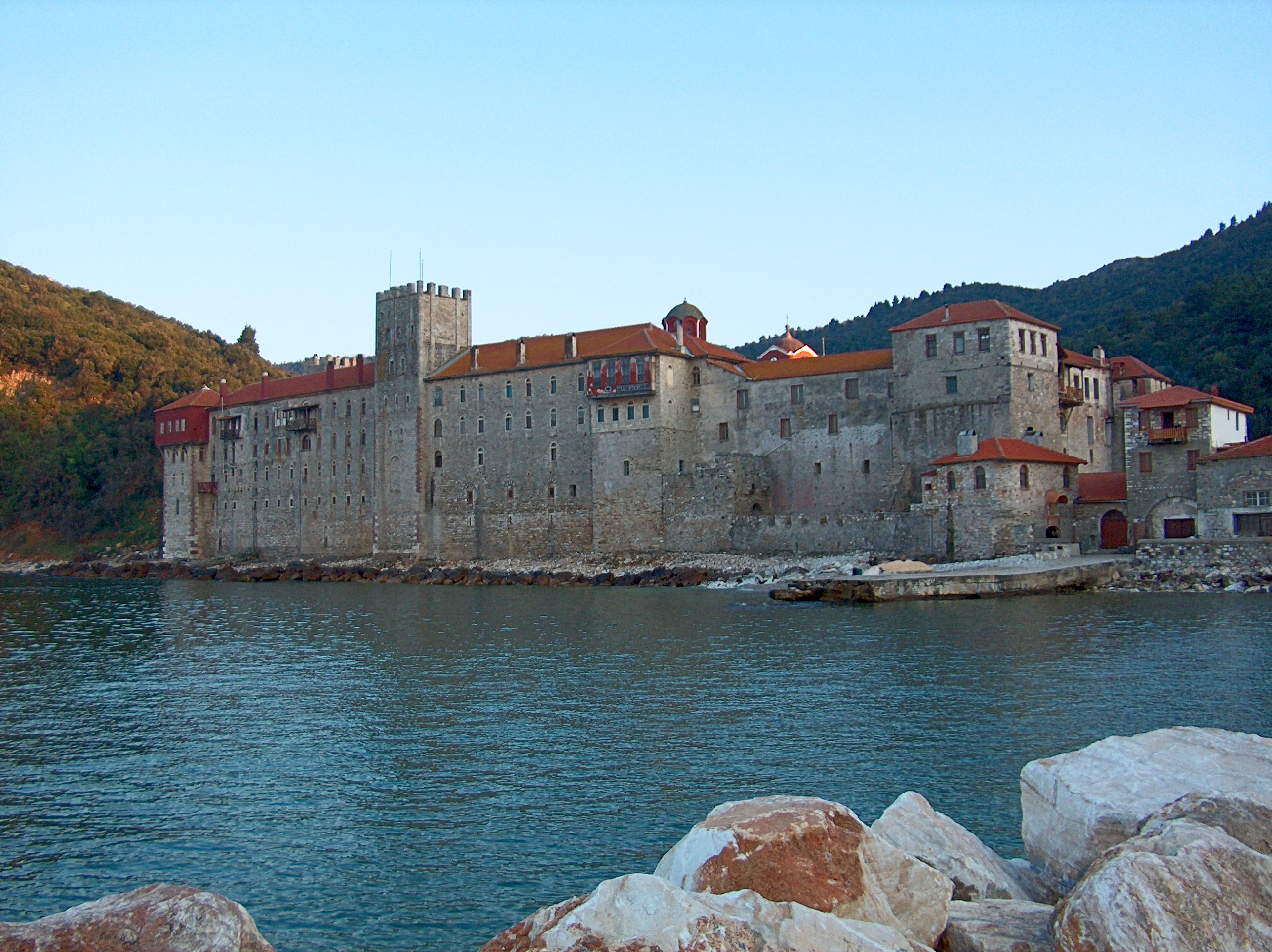
- External view of the monastery façade from a nearby quay.

- Location within Mount Athos
- Interactive map of Esphigmenou

Monastery information
- Full name: Sacred Patriarchal and Stauropegic Monastery Esphigmenou
- Dedication: Ascension of Christ
- Diocese: Mount Athos

People
- Founders: Theodosius II & Pulcheria (According to Athonite tradition)
- Prior: Archimandrite Elder Methodius (Papalambrakopoulos) (de facto); Archimandrite Elder Bartholomew (Gazetas) (de jure)

Site
- Location: Mount Athos, Greece
- Coordinates: 40.352689°N 24.138053°E
- Public access: Men only

The Sacred Patriarchal and Stauropegic Monastery Esphigmenou (Greek: Ιερά Πατριαρχική και Σταυροπηγιακή Μονή Εσφιγμένου) is an Eastern Orthodox monastery dedicated to the Ascension of Christ in the monastic state of Mount Athos in Greece. It is built next to the sea at the northern part of the Athonite peninsula. Located near the Hilandar monastery, it is the northernmost of all Athonite monasteries.

The current monastery dates back to the 10th century, while tradition holds that the site had been used as a monastery since as early as the 5th century. Esphigmenou ranks eighteenth in the hierarchy of the Athonite monasteries and since the early 1970s has been embroiled in legal and ecclesiastical disputes. It is considered amongst the most conservative of the monastic houses on Mount Athos.

== Name ==
In Greek, the monastery's name literally means tightened, and there are conflicting traditions regarding the origin of the name. One attributes it to the fact that the monastery is built on a stretch of land, tightened by three surrounding hills and the sea. John Comnenus, a 17th-century metropolitan of Drystra, wrote in his book Proskynetarion tou Agiou Orous tou Athonos:

It is called Esphigmenou because it is restricted by three small mountains, close to the sea.

Another tradition attributes the name to a monk who either founded or restored the monastery, recounting that he used to wear a tight rope around his waist, so from him the monastery got its name "of the tightened".

== History ==
Athonite tradition attributes the foundation of the monastery to the Byzantine Emperor Theodosius II and his sister St. Pulcheria during the 5th century; the remains of this early monastery, having been subsequently destroyed by a huge rock that fell from the nearby hills, can still be found 500 metres from the existing monastery. However, historical and archaeological evidence cannot safely confirm this tradition and, therefore, the precise time of the monastery's foundation, as well as its founders, cannot be positively identified.

The evidence can however confirm that as early as the late 10th or early 11th century the monastery existed. It is mentioned in at least three manuscripts. The monastery is referred to in a letter by Saint Paul of Xeropotamou dating from 1016. The will of the monk Demetrius of Chalki, dating from 1030, is signed by a monk who calls himself "Theoktistos monk and abbot of Esphigmenou Monastery". Finally, the monastery is mentioned in the second Typicon of Mount Athos in 1046.

The monastery greatly prospered until the Ottoman conquest. Many Byzantine emperors, such as John V Palaiologos, contributed to this prosperity, as did other Orthodox rulers such as Serbian Emperor Stefan Dušan and Serbian Despot Đurađ Branković. This prosperity was however overshadowed by constant disputes over land issues with the neighboring Vatopediou monastery, as well as by many pirate raids and two great fires that damaged the monastery during the 14th century. According to manuscripts held in the monastery's collection, the pirates posed a serious threat to the monastery because the sea near it is usually calm compared to the seas around the rest of the Athonite peninsula. Because of these reasons the monastery was eventually ruined and practically deserted, which allowed the nearby monasteries of Hilandar and Zograf to grab various portions of land from it, which led to further legal disputes.

However, the monastery managed to recover eventually, as evidenced by a manuscript dated from 1569 that tells of 51 monks working for its reestablishment. In 1655, Czar Alexis I of Russia gave the monks permission to travel throughout his lands every five years to raise funds for the monastery. During the same period the rulers of the Danubian Principalities also made significant contributions to the monastery. During the early 18th century, Bishop Gregory of Melenikon made donations to the monastery and eventually became one of its monks, undertaking a renovation of the monastery. Also, Bishop Daniel of Thessaloniki took care of the monastery's finances and, with the consent of the Athonite community and Patriarch Gerasimus III of Constantinople, made the monastery a cenobium. The relevant patriarchical edict was published in 1797 by Patriarch Gregory V of Constantinople, who also rebuilt the southern part of the monastery that had been ruined.

A series of competent abbots (Acacius, Euthymius, Theodoritus, and Agathangellus) greatly renovated and expanded the monastery, to the point where the current structures date almost exclusively from their time. The successor of Agathangellus, Lucas, founded an iconographic school, which did great service to the monastery for many years.

During the Greek War of Independence, the monastery, being the northernmost on the peninsula, suffered gravely from the Ottoman armies that ravaged Mount Athos. However, during this period, it also experienced some degree of prosperity.

During the Macedonian Struggle, the monastery supported the Greek guerillas in their struggle against the Bulgarian komitadjis.

== Controversy ==
Esphigmenou along with other Mt. Athos monasteries, sketes and monks, had been involved in a long dispute with the Ecumenical Patriarchate of Constantinople. The dispute continues since a new "Esphigmenou brotherhood", was established.

The monastic community of Mount Athos is under the direct spiritual jurisdiction of the Ecumenical Patriarch and all Athonite monks are canonically required to commemorate (Greek: να μνημονεύουν) the Patriarch. However, since the 1970s, Esphigmenou, along with other Mt. Athos monasteries, had accused the Ecumenical Patriarch Athenagoras of being ecumenist and had refused to commemorate him. These complaints mainly consist of canon law prohibiting Orthodox from praying with heretics.

The relationship between the current occupant monks of Esphigmenou Monastery and the Ecumenical Patriarchate has greatly deteriorated since 2002, when Ecumenical Patriarch Bartholomew I of Constantinople declared them as being in schism from the Orthodox Church (using a rule that many believe was created to keep Roman Catholics out of the Holy Mountain). Since the Constitution of Greece prohibits schismatics (or Roman Catholics) from dwelling in Athos, the occupants of Esphigmenou were ordered by a Thessaloniki court to leave the monastery; however they refused to comply. The case was taken to the Supreme Court of Greece.

The Holy Synod of the Ecumenical Patriarchate of Constantinople reacted by declaring the schismatic monks inside Esphigmenou illegal, and on 3 October 2005 sanctioned the formation of a new Esphigmenou brotherhood, under the spiritual guidance of Archimandrite Chrysostomos Katsoulieris. In November 2005 Katsoulieris and his monks tried to take over the ‘old’ Esphigmenou konaki in Karyes (building 23), but failed and the police had to be invoked to separate the parties. On Sunday, October 22, 2006, Patriarch Bartholomew himself placed the “foundation stone” of the new and official konaki of Esphigmenou. This is a new building near the old konaki (nr 23A). Temporary, until the dispute is resolved, this konaki will be the (official) monastery itself. For this event a heavy police force was mobilized but the ceremony was completed calmly and peacefully. Esphigmenou again gained global attention in December 2006 when members of the new brotherhood tried to force their way into the monastery's offices in Karyes (in the "old" konaki at nr 23). In the ensuing clashes seven monks were severely injured: four of the ‘official’ monks and three of the schismatic monks. All were brought to hospital by the police outside Athos. The last three were not allowed to return to the Holy Mountain.

In January 2007, the district attorney of Thessaloniki pressed charges against the monks of Esphigmenou ("σχισματικοί ρασοφόροι") for "embezzlement" of over 150,000 euros and the estate rightfully belonging to the monastery.

In 2014, Greek police took part in an operation to clear an apartment in Thessaloniki used as a hostel by the 'old' Esphigmenou monks. Police said one monk and five supporters were in the apartment in central Thessaloniki during the raid, which followed a court ruling for the eviction. Riot police cordoned off surrounding blocks to prevent other supporters from hindering the operation.

The monks continued to remain inside the premises of Esphigmenou Monastery, under blockade, as shown in a 2016 travel documentary by British presenter Simon Reeve. The supply ship that supports Mt. Athos no longer stops at Esphigmenou, their bank accounts have been seized and nearly all of their property outside Mt. Athos has been taken over by the 'new' monastic community.

In January 2017, eight monks of 'old' Esphigmenou monastic community, including abbot Methodios (Papalamprakopoulos), received jail sentences in-absentia from Thessaloniki Mixed Jury Criminal Court. The monks were charged with instigating violence and throwing Molotov cocktails at police officers following an incident in July 2013 in the Athonite capital of Karyes (relating to the occupation of the 'old' konaki building). The incident in question occurred when court bailiffs arrived to the Esphigmenou administrative offices in Karyes on July 29, 2013, to evict the schismatic monks, who responded by throwing three Molotov cocktails and an explosive device. Abbot Methodios and monk Antypas, the main aggressor, both received twenty-year sentences, effective immediately. The other six monks were charged as accomplices, receiving sentences of ten years and four months. The sentence was appealed by the defendants.

In April 2019, the monks inhabiting the buildings of Esphigmenou Monastery, considered squatters by the Ecumenical Patriarchate and the Sacred Community of Mt. Athos, were sentenced to 6-months imprisonment with a 3-year suspension for fraud against the Greek state. The schismatic monks were illegally exempted from the value-added tax and pretending to be the regular administration of the monastery by using the name and seal of the Holy Monastery of Esphigmenou. Thus, they were illegally receiving economic benefits, not paying the taxes due. Monks of the Holy Mountain are exempt from the tax, but the squatter monks are not officially considered Athonites. A few days later, a Thessaloniki appeals court handed down a sentence of 17-years’ imprisonment and a fine of 600 euros for the abbot Methodios and the monk Antypas for the 2013 attacks. The other six monks were sentenced to 9 years and 5 months (all prison sentences were slightly reduced from the 2017 ruling).

On 8 July 2020, the Greek Supreme Court rejected the appeal filed by the 'old' Esphigmenou community against the decision of the Court of Appeals of Thessaloniki from June 17, that obliged them to hand over all the occupied territories both on and outside of Mt. Athos to the new Esphigmenou brotherhood, currently based in the Athonite capital of Karyes. On July 23 police officers arrived at the monastery's dependencies in Ierissos and in Nea Roda and forced the monks to leave.

As of 2022, the conflict is ongoing, with the 'old' Esphigmenou monks still occupying the monastery buildings and the administration building in Karyes. Banners with the slogan Orthodoxia i Thanatos (Ορθοδοξία ή Θάνατος, "Orthodoxy or Death") can still be seen at the monastery.

As of July 2024, the police has been preparing an operation to evict the monks.

== Architecture ==
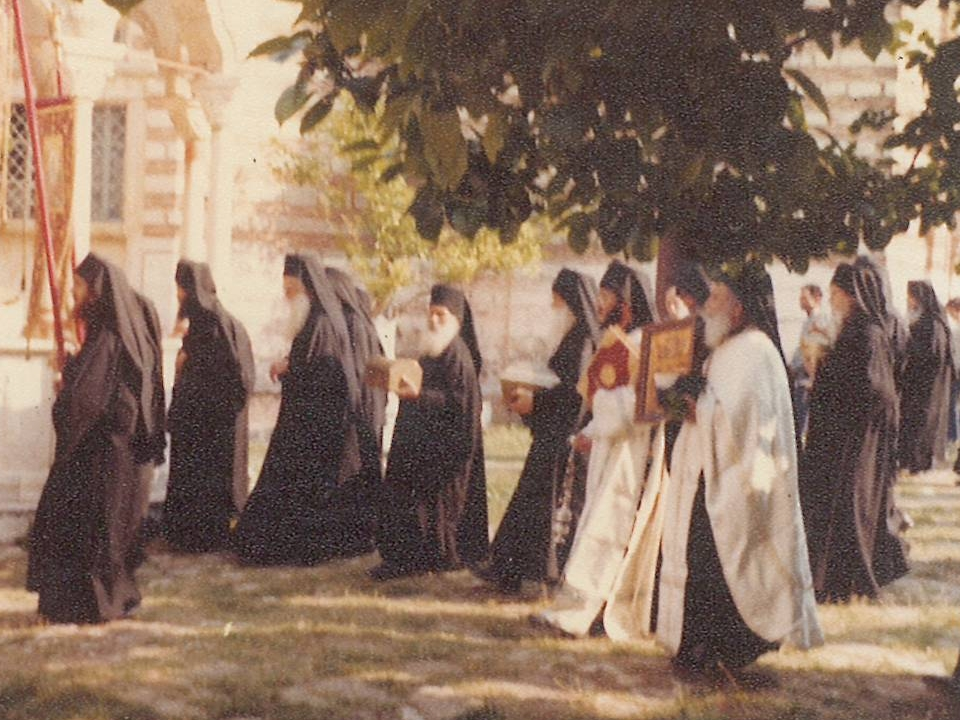
Procession to the font behind the catholicon for the lesser blessing of waters following the all-night vigil, feast of the Ascension, 1978

The monastery is home to various important structures. Although the monastery was founded no later than the 11th century, the current structures were built mainly during the first half of the 19th century. The general outline of the monastery is a rectangular wall which forms a spacious inner courtyard. In the middle of the courtyard lies the catholicon surrounded by the wings that house the monks' cells, the guesthouse and the refectory.

The catholicon, which is dedicated to the Ascension of Christ, was built between 1806 and 1810 by the abbot Theodoritos on the site of an earlier catholicon and in the manner of Athonite churches. It was consecrated by Patriarch Gregory V in 1811. The construction of the catholicon was greatly aided by personal donations from Bishop Ignatius of Kassandreia. The temple itself is spacious and majestic and bears eight domes on its lead-covered roof, the central dome being the largest. The marble used for its construction was transported to Athos from Tinos, the place of origin of the church's architect, Paul.

The nave of the catholicon was decorated with iconography in 1811 and the sanctuary in 1818 by the iconographers Veniamin, Zacharias and Makarios. The decoration was completed in 1841 with iconography of the narthex by the iconographers Ioasaf, Nikiforos, Gerasimos and Anthimos. The altar, the iconostasis, as well as other features of the temple, date back to this era. The iconostasis in particular, which depicts scenes from the Old and the New Testaments, is carved wood, covered with golden plating and is considered one of the most important post-Byzantine iconostases on Athos. The catholicon also has two chapels, a vestibule and a porch, added in 1845 by Ecumenical Patriarch Anthimus VI of Constantinople, a previous Esphigmenite monk.

Outside the southeastern corner of the catholicon there is a font (Greek: Φιάλη), that is used to keep holy water. It was built in 1815 by the abbot Euthymios, at the site of an older similar structure that dated from the time of John V Palaiologos. The structure is roofed by a dome that is held up by eight marble columns, connected by sculpted marble metopes.

The refectory is the oldest building in the monastery. It is a semi-detached building in the west wing, across from the catholicon. It is a rectangular building, renovated in 1810 by Abbot Euthymios. Its iconography, dating back to the 16th and 17th centuries still survives, albeit greatly damaged by the fires that the Ottoman soldiers lit to accommodate themselves during their stay in the monastery during the Greek revolutionary war.

The monastery also has 13 chapels, eight inside the main complex and five outside. Among the inner chapels, the most important are the chapel of the Presentation of Mary and the chapel of the Archangels at the sides of the catholicon. The other inner chapels are distributed at various sites inside the monastery and contain no frescoes but house important icons. Of the outer chapels, the most notable is the chapel of Saint Anthony of Kiev, the founder of the Kiev Pechersk Lavra — St. Anthony's life states he became a monk on Athos and Esphigmenou's tradition has his having lived in a secluded cave there overlooking the sea, which is still shown to visitors, and he is commemorated on the feast for All Saints of Esphigmenou — that lies just across from the monastery.

== Cultural treasures ==
The monastery's treasury houses many important relics. The treasury, along with the monastery's library are temporarily housed over the catholicon's narthex. Among important cultural treasures, such as crosses, books, garments, etc., Esphigmenou has in its possession a large (3.05×2.80 m) part of Napoleon Bonaparte's tent, which was donated to the monastery by Patriarch Gregory V of Constantinople. The monks use this once a year, at the celebration of the Ascension of Christ, as a tent over the entrance of the catholicon.

The so-called Cross of Pulcheria lies at the catholicon's altar, which also houses cases of holy relics and a very important Byzantine mosaic icon. The icon is barely 0.15×0.07 m^{2} and depicts Christ in a standing position in great detail. The icon is surrounded by a silver frame that depicts the apostles, while holy relics are embedded on its lower side.

The monastery also has a large collection of manuscripts. Its library houses 372 manuscripts, of which 75 are parchment, some bearing iconographic decoration. Famous among these is the renowned Minologion, coded #14, that bears 80 miniatures. The library also holds a collection of roughly 2,000 printed books, while 6,000 more are housed in another part of the monastery, on the second floor of the northern wing.

== Administration of Mount Athos ==
The Holy Mountain is governed by the "Holy Community" (Ιερά Κοινότης) which consists of the representatives of the 20 Holy Monasteries, having as executive committee the four-membered "Holy Administration" (Ιερά Επιστασία), with the Protos (Πρώτος) being its head. Civil authorities are represented by the Civil Governor, appointed by the Greek Ministry of Foreign Affairs, whose main duty is to supervise the function of the institutions and the public order.

Due to its irregular relations with the patriarchate of Constantinople, the current occupants of Esphigmenou Monastery had long not been represented in the "Holy Community", but presently the new canonical Esphigmenou brotherhood, which is still seeking access to the monastery land, seats a representative.

== Bibliography ==
- Kadas, Sotiris (1981). The Holy Mountain (in Greek). Athens: Ekdotike Athenon. ISBN 960-213-199-3.
