= Bogoroditsa Skete =

- Σκήτη Βογορόδιτσας
- Location within Mount Athos
- Interactive map of Bogoroditsa Skete

Monastery information
- Established: 1020 or earlier
- Dedication: Dormition of the Mother of God

Site
- Location: Mount Athos; Greece
- Coordinates: 40°17′30″N 24°14′20″E
- Public access: Men only

Bogoroditsa (Greek: Σκήτη Βογορόδιτσας) is a skete (smaller, dependent monastic house) of the Agiou Panteleimonos monastery (Monastery of St. Panteleimon) in the monastic state of Mount Athos, Greece.

It is inhabited by Bulgarian monks and it follows the coenobitic way of monastic life. The complex became a skete in 1818 and today has a main church and secondary chapel.

The Skete is situated in a forested area, between the monasteries of Vatopedi and Pantokrator.

Bogoroditsa lies on the site of the pre-existing monastery of Xylourgos. Xylourgos (meaning Carpenter) had been a fully, independent Russian community known from as early as 1020. The majority of the community moved in 1169 to the Monastery of St. Panteleimon, but Xylourgos continued to thrive through the 11th and 12th centuries.
