= Skete of the Annunciation =

Orthodox skete in Mount Athos, Greece

Coordinates: 40.2525°N 24.1981°E

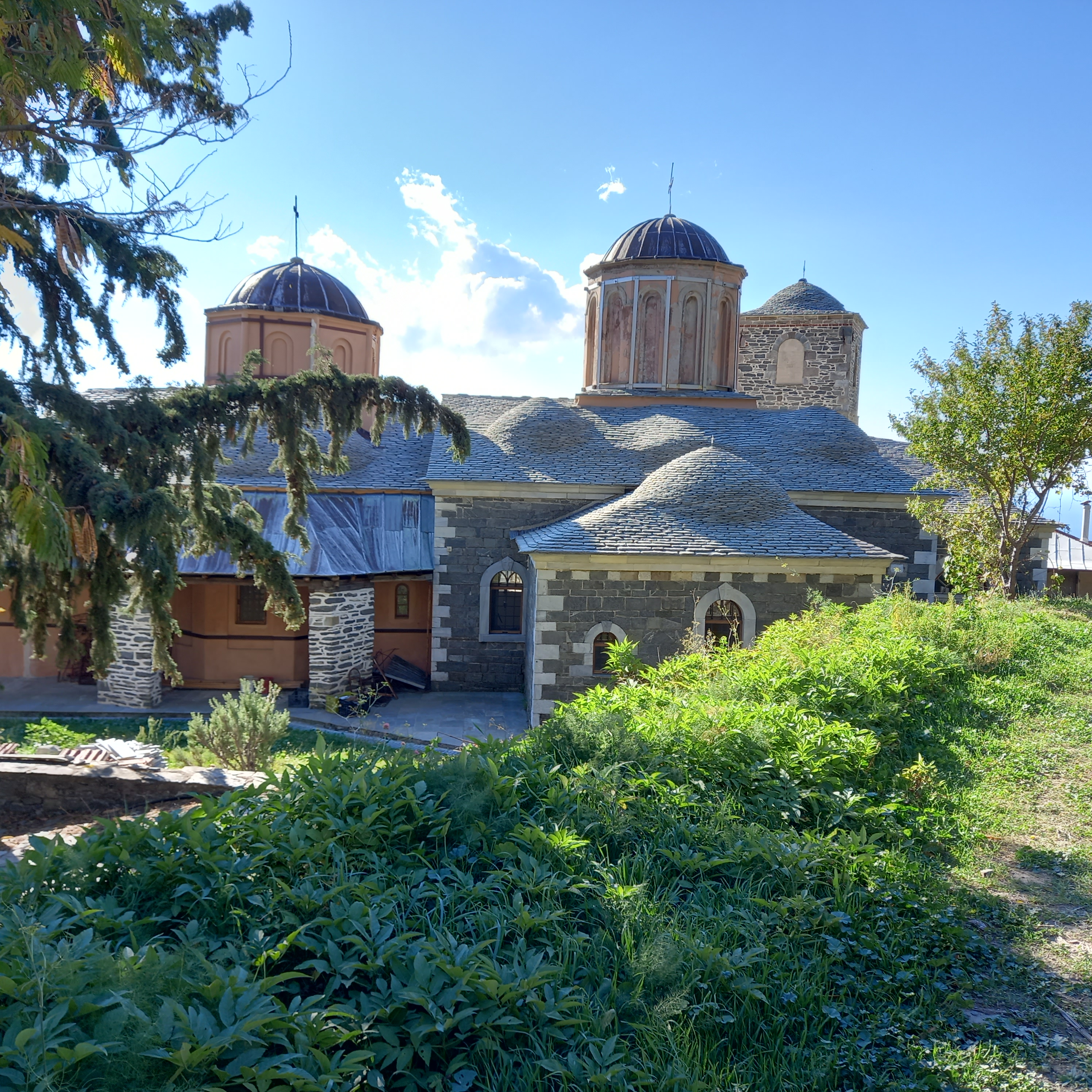
The main church of the skete

The Skete of the Annunciation of the Theotokos (Greek: Σκήτη Ευαγγελισμού της Θεοτόκου) is a skete of the Monastery of Xenophontos, on Mount Athos, Greece.

The skete was founded in 1766 by the hieromonk Sylvester, and the monks Efrem and Agapios.

Today the skete consists of 26 residences occupied by 10 monks, a library holding 360 hand written codexes and 500 prints, and a church built in 1766 containing 100 icons and the relics of St. Charalampos and St. Modestos.
