= Protos (monastic office) =

The protos (Greek: πρώτος, "first, premier") is a monastic office at the Orthodox monastic community of Mount Athos in Greece. The office headquarters are located in Karyes, Mount Athos.

== Authority ==
The office is assumed by a monk who is elected among the members of the Iera Epistasia ("Holy Administration" or "Holy Executive Committee") which functions as the executive committee of the Iera Koinotita ("Holy Community") — the governing body of the monastic community of Mount Athos, composed of representatives from each of the Athonite monasteries — to be the head of the Athonite monastic community.

The Protos is also known as the Protos Hesychastes, or the "First Hesychast."

== History ==
Since the founding of the Karyes Protaton in the tenth century until 1312, the Protos was directly appointed by the Byzantine Emperor after being elected by the hegumenoi of Mount Athos. However, in November 1312, Andronikos II Palaiologos issued a chrysobull requiring the Protos to be appointed by the Ecumenical Patriarch of Constantinople rather than by the Emperor. The third typikon of Mount Athos, issued in 1400 and signed by Manuel II Palaiologos, also reaffirmed this requirement while also restoring various rights and powers of the Protos.

== List of protoi ==
- Christodoulos of Patmos, after 1093
- Hilarion
- John Tarchaneiotes, ca. 1107
- John Chortaitinos, fl. 1253
- Niphon Kausokalybites, 1345-1347
- Anthony, 1348 (Serbian)
- Dorotheus of Hilandar, 1356-1366 (Serbian)
