= Dafni, Mount Athos =

Coordinates: 40°12′51″N 24°13′19″E

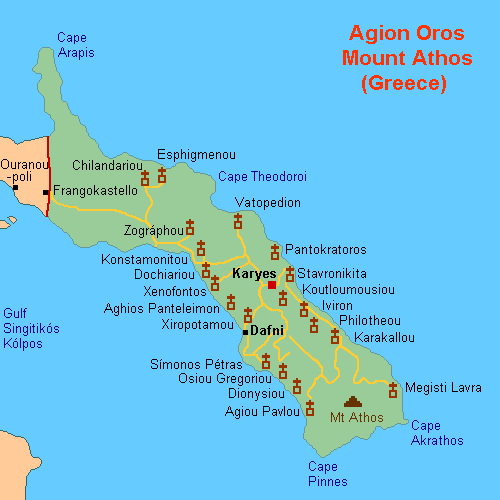
Map of the Athonite peninsula.

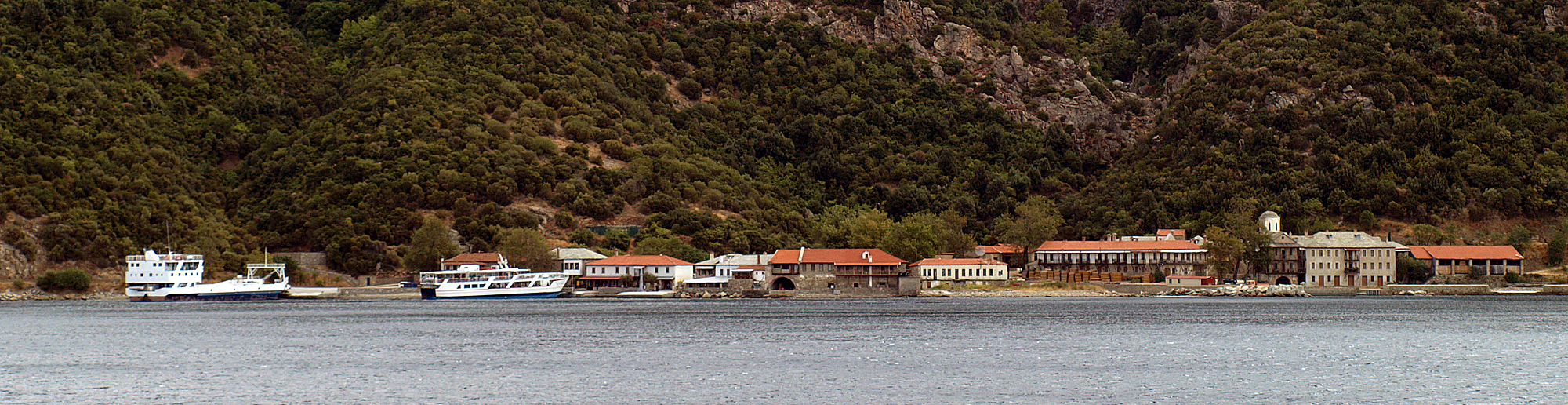
Dafni, view from the sea

Dafni (Greek: Δάφνη) is a small settlement on Mount Athos. It is located on the southern coast of the Athonite peninsula between Xeropotamou Monastery and Simonopetra Monastery. It is used mainly as a port and an entry point to the Athonite monastic state, with daily ferries from the town of Ouranoupoli, Chalkidiki. There are also domestic ferries from Dafni to other parts of the peninsula, including the port of Kafsokalyvia and various individual monasteries. The 2001 Greek national census reported a population of 38 inhabitants.
