= Karyes, Mount Athos =

Karyes Καρυές
- Settlement
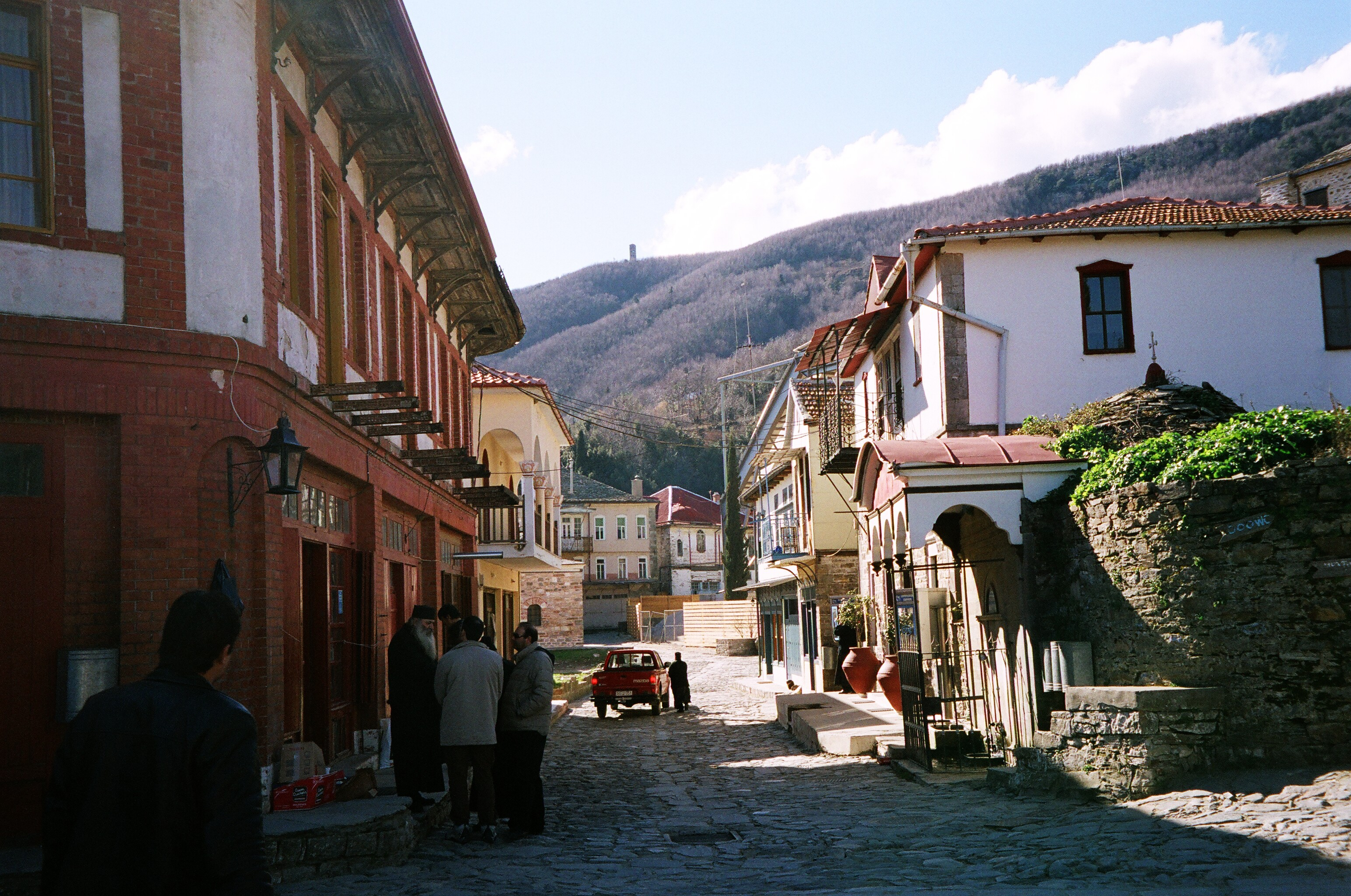
- The main street in Karyes

- Location within Greece
- Coordinates: 40°15′26″N 24°14′45″E
- Country: Greece
- Administrative region: Monastic community of Mount Athos

Population (2021)
  - Total: 135
- Time zone: UTC+2 (EET)
  - Summer (DST): UTC+3 (EEST)

Karyes (Greek: Καρυές) is a settlement in Mount Athos of the Athonite monastic community. The 2021 Greek census reported a population of 135 inhabitants. It is the largest settlement in Mount Athos.

The major church at Karyes is the Protaton, which is the church of the Protos, or president of the monastic community. The famed Axion Estin icon is kept at the Protaton. Each of the twenty monasteries of Mount Athos also has a konaki, or representative's residence, at Karyes.

Koutloumousiou Monastery is located just a few hundred meters to the south of the town center of Karyes.

== History ==
Serbian Bishop Saint Sava built a church and cell at Karyes, where he stayed for some years, becoming a hieromonk, then an archimandrite in 1201. He wrote the Karyes Typicon during his stay there, and a marble inscription of his work still exists. In 1219 Sava became the first Archbishop of Serbia.

In the year 1283, Latin Crusaders during the reign of the Byzantine Emperor Michael Paleologos, attacked Mount Athos. They tortured and hanged the Protos, and sacked the Protaton, murdering many of the monks. These monks are commemorated as martyrs by the Eastern Orthodox Church on 5 December (for those churches which follow the traditional Julian Calendar, 5 December falls on 18 December of the Gregorian Calendar).

== Geography ==
=== Climate ===
Climate data for Karyes, Greece
Month	Jan	Feb	Mar	Apr	May	Jun	Jul	Aug	Sep	Oct	Nov	Dec	Year
Mean daily maximum °C (°F)	10 (50)	11 (52)	13 (55)	17 (63)	21 (70)	26 (79)	29 (84)	29 (84)	25 (77)	20 (68)	16 (61)	12 (54)	19 (66)
Mean daily minimum °C (°F)	6 (43)	7 (45)	9 (48)	11 (52)	16 (61)	20 (68)	23 (73)	24 (75)	20 (68)	16 (61)	12 (54)	8 (46)	14 (58)
Source: "Karyes Monthly Climate Average, Greece". World Weather Online.

== Gallery ==
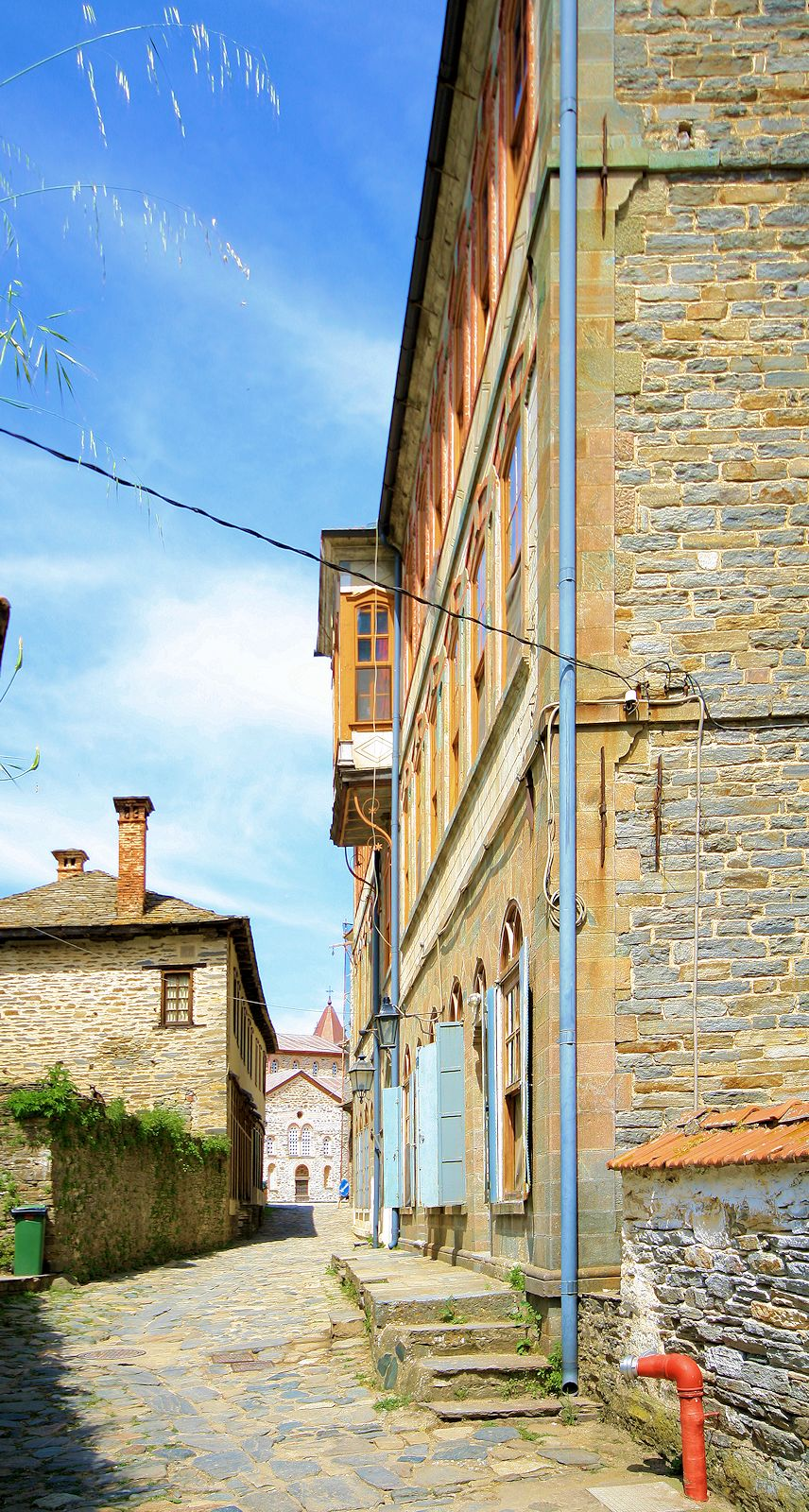

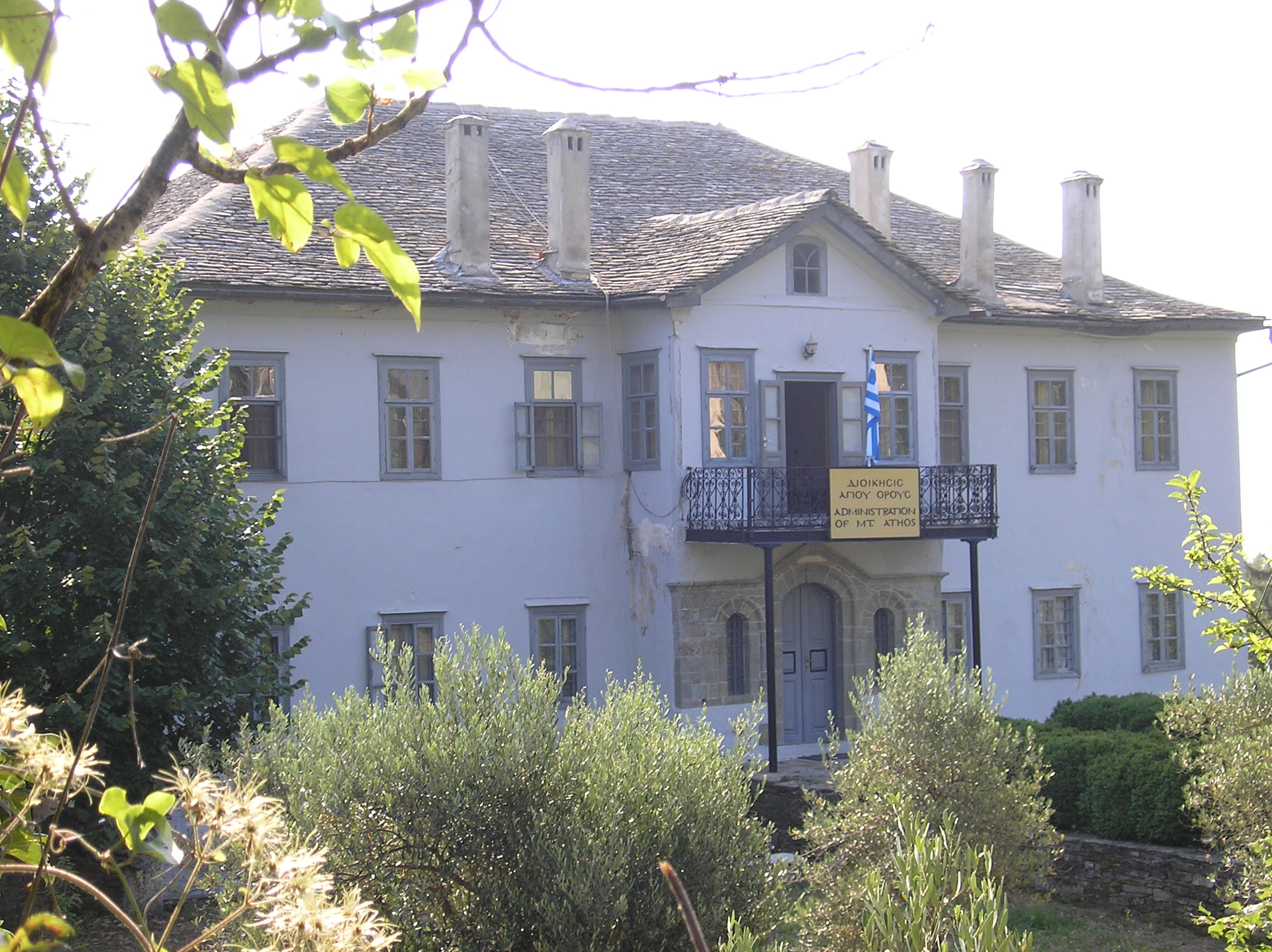
Mt Athos administration building

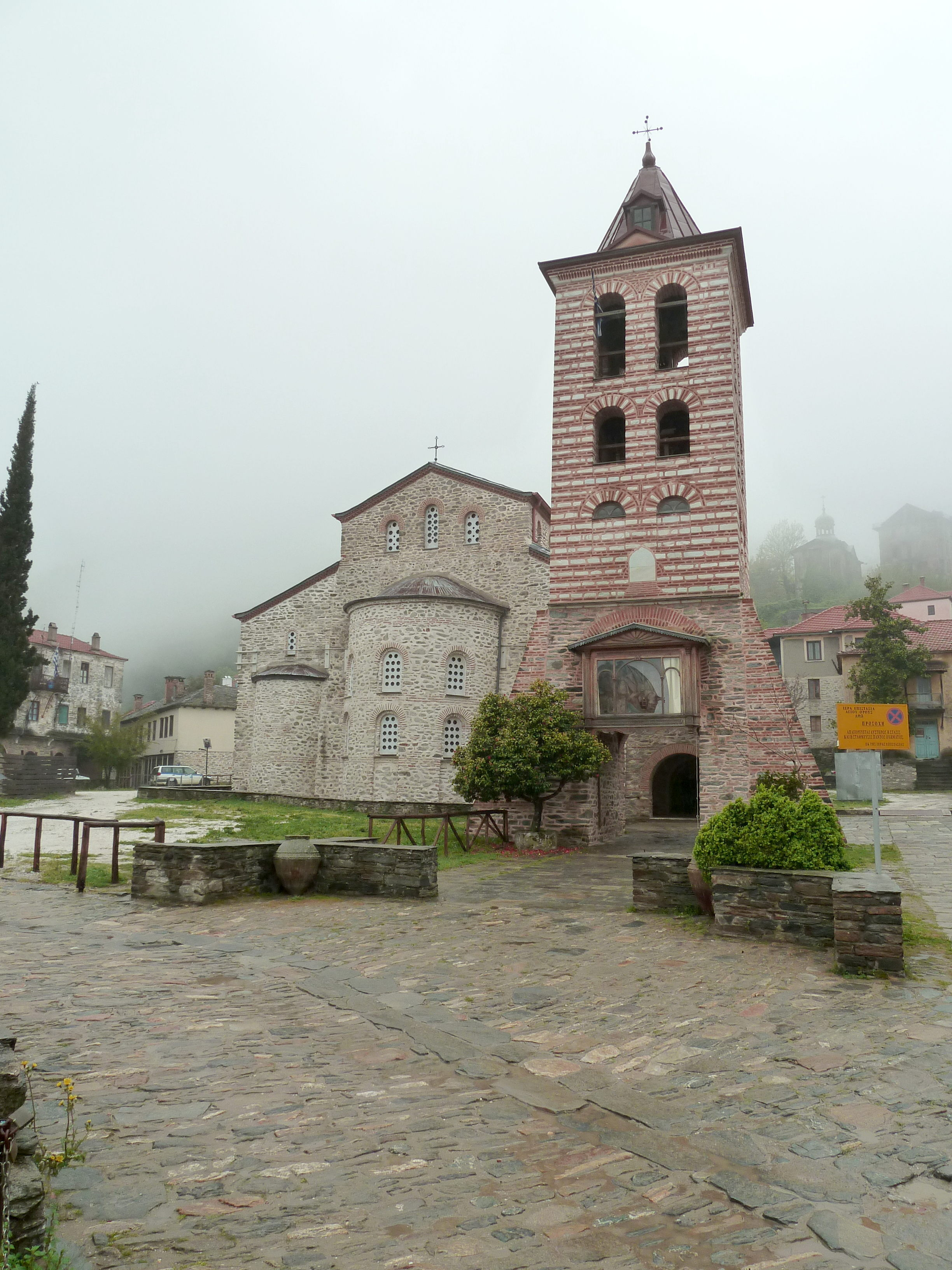
The main church (Protaton)

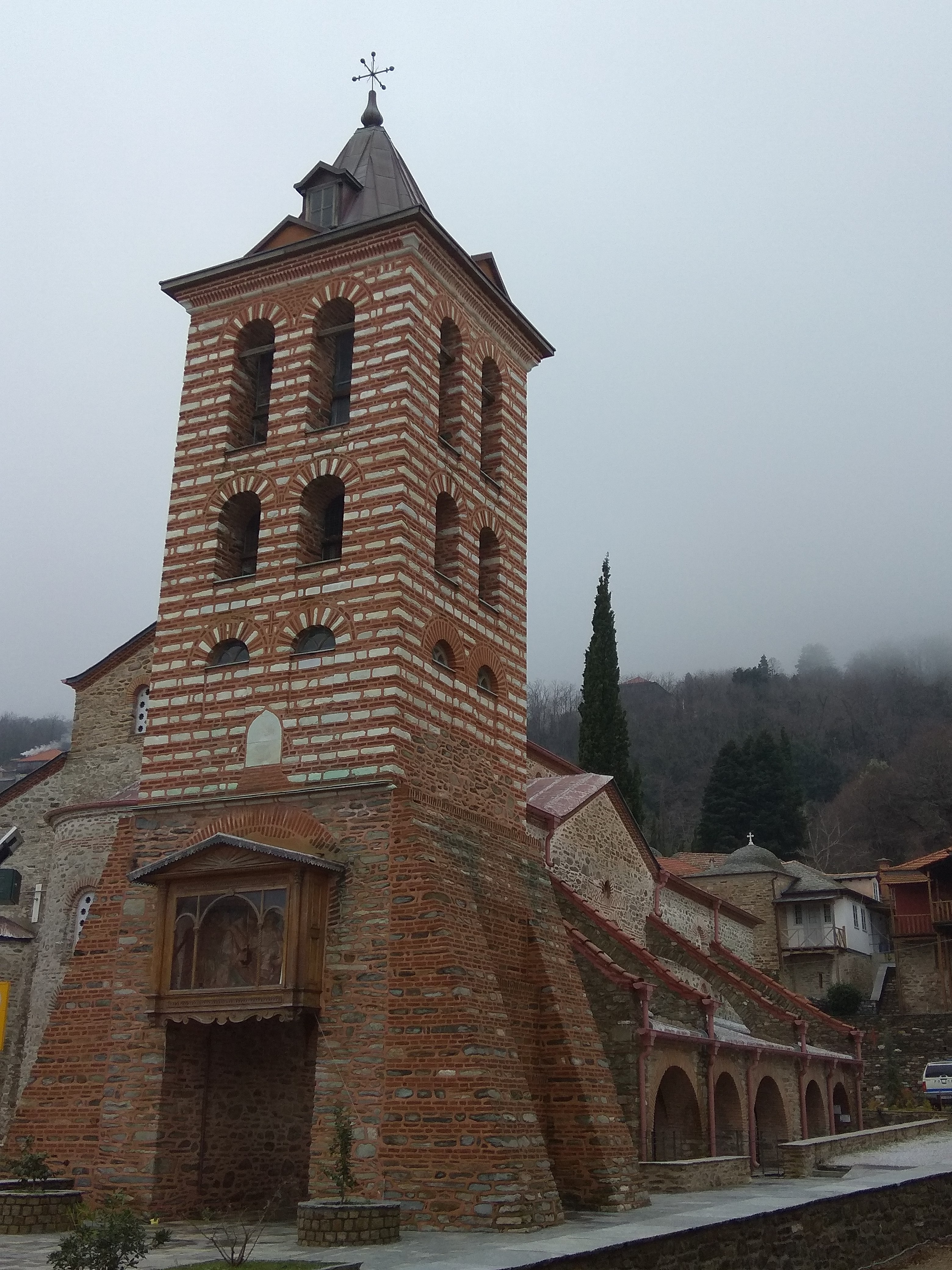
Closer view of the main church

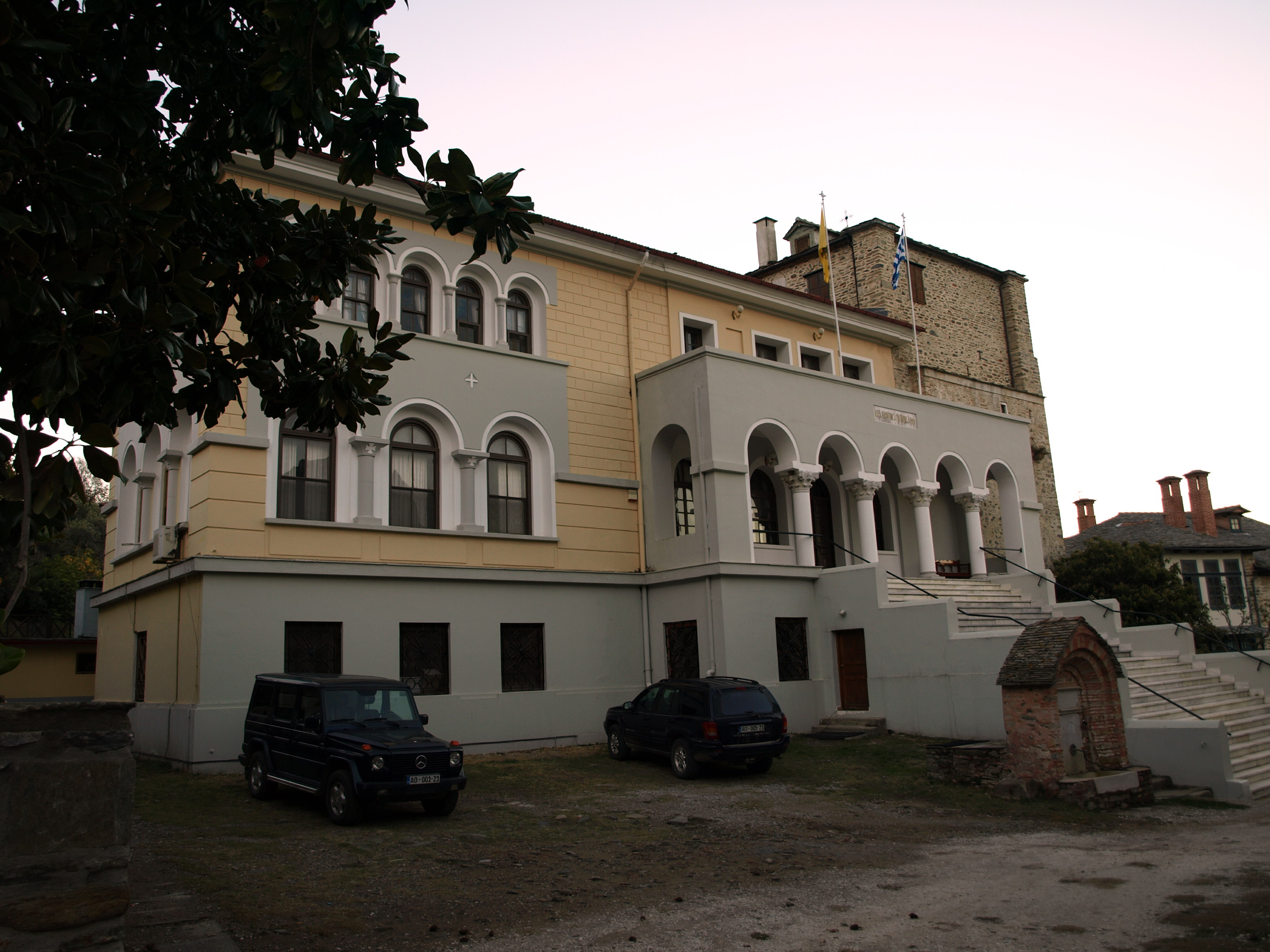
The building of the monastic Community (Iera Koinotita)

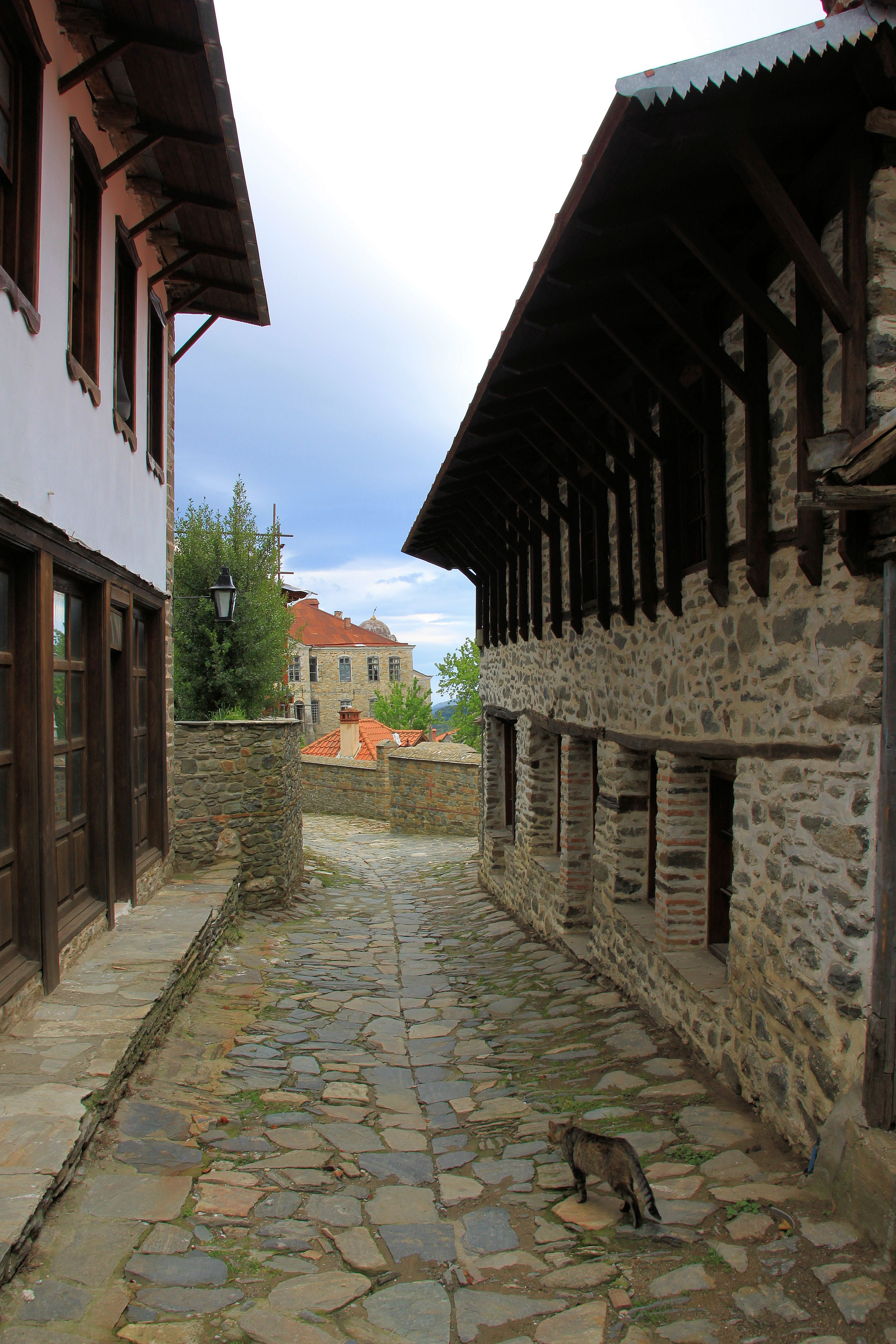
Α cobbled street

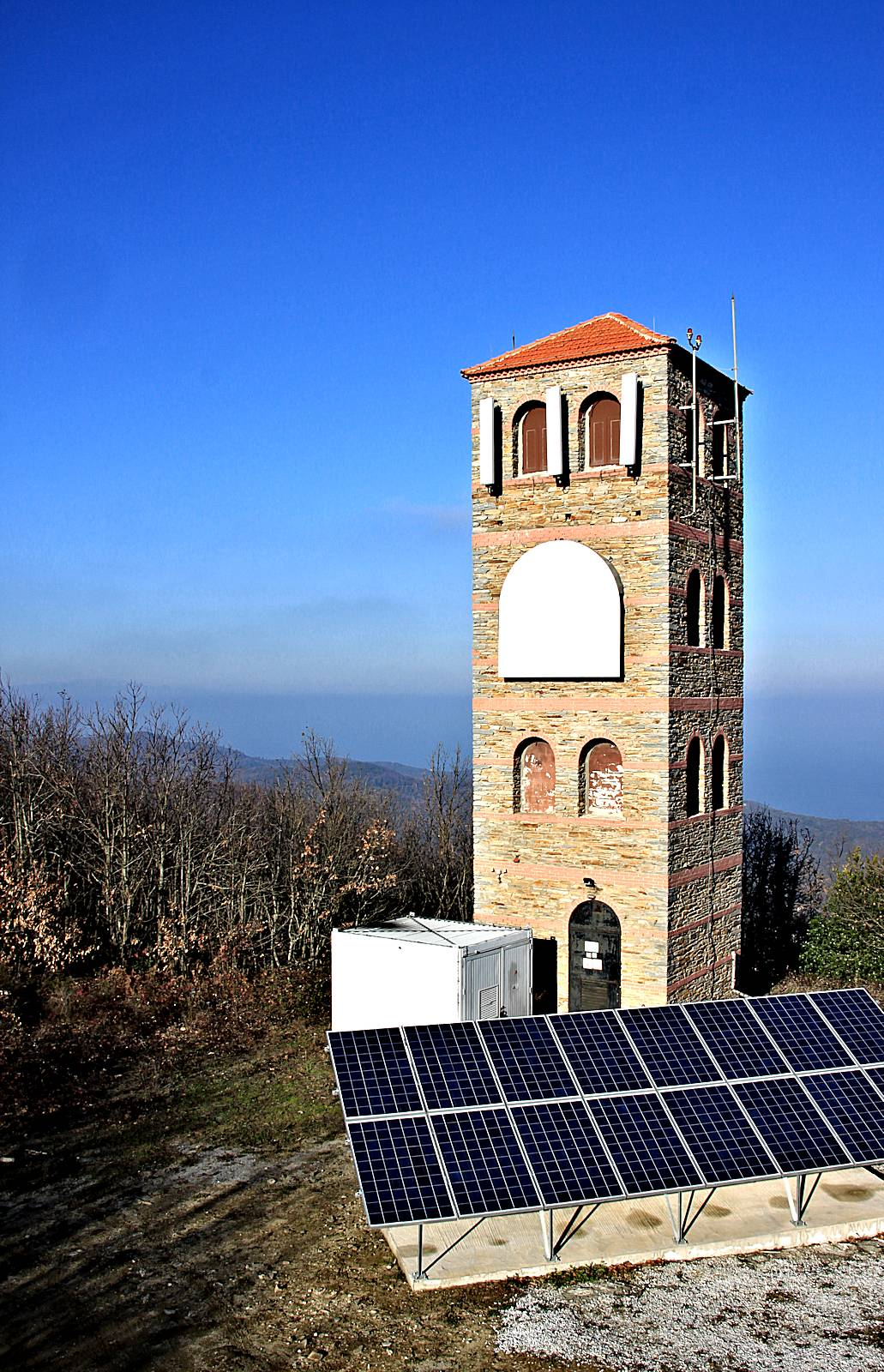
Α stone tower

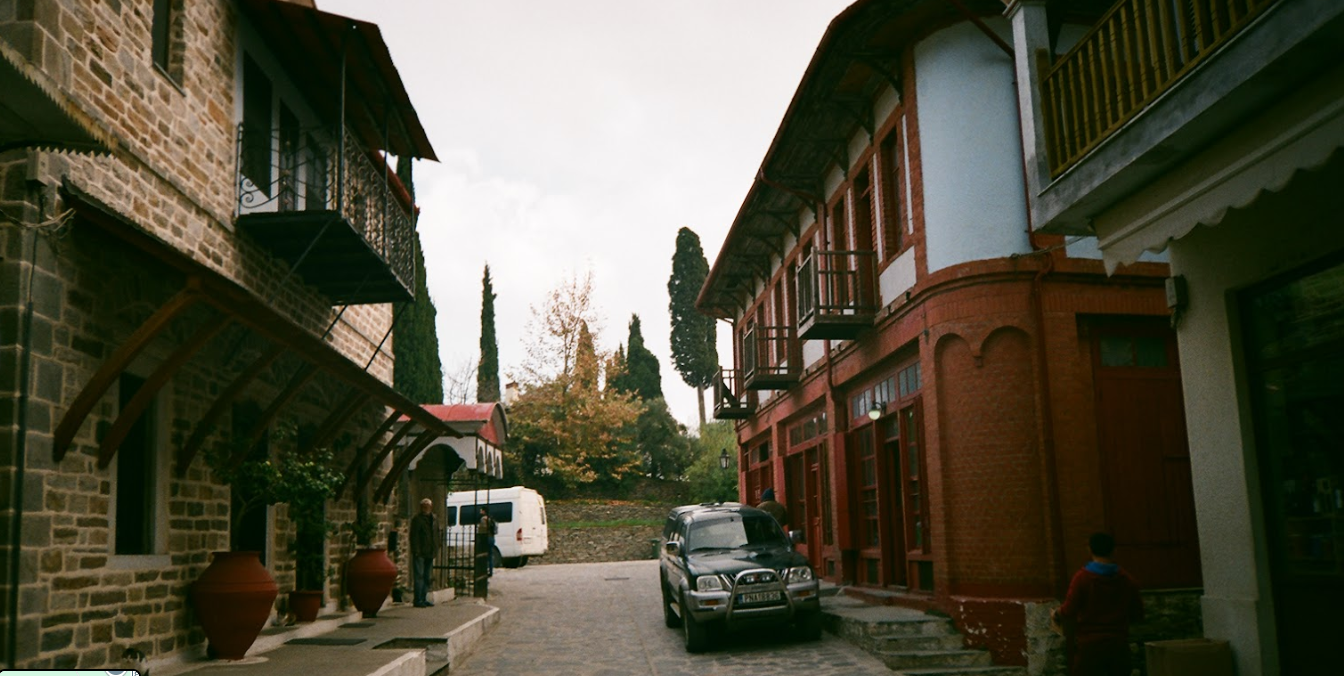
The shop Σ. Ν. Καρτσιώτης in Karyes, Mount Athos
