= List of New Testament lectionaries (501–1000) =

A New Testament Lectionary is a handwritten copy of a lectionary, or book of New Testament Bible readings. Lectionaries may be written in majuscule or minuscule Greek letters, on parchment, papyrus, vellum, or paper.

Lectionaries which have the Gospels readings are called Evangeliaria or Evangelistaria, those which have the Acts or Epistles, Apostoli or Praxapostoli. They appear from the 6th century.

Gregory in 1909 enumerated 2234 lectionaries. To the present day 2484 lectionary manuscripts have been catalogued by the (INTF) in Münster.

Below is the list of lectionary 501 to 1000. For other related lists, see:

- List of New Testament lectionaries
- List of New Testament lectionaries (1–500)
- List of New Testament lectionaries (1001–1500)
- List of New Testament lectionaries (1501–2000)

== Legend ==
- The numbers (#) are the now standard system of Caspar René Gregory (Gregory–Aland).
- Dates are estimated to the nearest century (except lectionaries dated by scribes which are shown in the Date column).
- Content only the Gospel lessons (Evangelistarion), and other lessons from the rest of the NT apart from Revelation (Apostolos). Sometimes the surviving portion of a codex is so limited that specific books, chapters or even verses can be indicated. Linked articles, where they exist, generally specify content in detail, by verse.
- Digital images are referenced with direct links to the hosting web pages. The quality and accessibility of the images is as follows:

Gold color indicates high resolution color images available online.
Tan color indicates high resolution color images available locally, not online.
Light tan color indicates only a small fraction of manuscript pages with color images available online.
Light gray color indicates black/white or microfilm images available online.
Light blue color indicates manuscript not imaged, and is currently lost or ownership unknown.
Light pink color indicates manuscript destroyed, presumed destroyed, or deemed too fragile to digitize.
Violet color indicates high resolution ultraviolet images available online.

Contents Legend:
† Indicates the manuscript has damaged or missing pages.
^{P} Indicates only a portion of the original book remains.
^{K} Indicates manuscript also includes commentary notes.
^{sel} Indicates contents include Scripture readings for selected days only.
^{e} Indicates contents include weekday Scripture readings.
^{esk} Indicates contents include weekday Scripture readings from Easter to Pentecost and Saturday/Sunday readings for other weeks.
^{sk} Indicates contents include only Saturday and Sunday Scripture readings.
^{Lit} Indicates Liturgical book containing an assortment of New Testament texts.
^{PsO} Indicates a Psalter with Biblical Odes.
[ ] Brackets around Gregory-Aland number indicate the number is no longer is use.

Script Legend:
ΑΩ indicates Majuscule script
αω indicates Minuscule script
P^{U} indicates manuscript is a palimpsest and script is the text under the later script.
P^{O} indicates manuscript is a palimpsest and script is the text over the prior script.

== List of named or notable lectionaries ==
=== Lectionaries 501–600 ===
#	Date	Contents	Script	Pages	Institution	City, State	Country	Images
ℓ 501	1641	Gospels + Apostles^{Lit}	αω	76	Exarchist Monastery of Saint Mary, G. b. 23	Grottaferrata	Italy	
ℓ 502	16th	Gospels + Apostles^{sk}	αω	114	Exarchist Monastery of Saint Mary, G. b. 24	Grottaferrata	Italy	
ℓ 503	13th	Gospels^{Lit}	αω	83	Exarchist Monastery of Saint Mary, G. b. 35	Grottaferrata	Italy	
ℓ 504	17th	†Gospels + Apostles^{k}	αω	91	Exarchist Monastery of Saint Mary, G. b. 38	Grottaferrata	Italy	
ℓ 505	16th	Gospels + Apostles^{Lit}	αω	335	Exarchist Monastery of Saint Mary, G. b. 42	Grottaferrata	Italy	
ℓ 506	18th	Gospels + Apostles^{Lit}	αω	77	Exarchist Monastery of Saint Mary, D. b. 22	Grottaferrata	Italy	
ℓ 507	14th	Gospels^{Lit}	αω P^{O}	115	Exarchist Monastery of Saint Mary, D. g. 7	Grottaferrata	Italy	
ℓ 508	18th	Gospels^{Lit-P}	αω	103	Exarchist Monastery of Saint Mary, D. g. 26	Grottaferrata	Italy	
ℓ 509	11th	Gospels^{P}	αω	14	Exarchist Monastery of Saint Mary, D. d. 6, 3	Grottaferrata	Italy	
ℓ 510	12th	†Gospels^{esk}	αω	131	Laurentian Library, Gadd. rel 124	Florence	Italy	CSNTM
ℓ 511	9th	Gospels^{P}	ΑΩ P^{U}	1	Riccardian Library, 69, fol. 110	Florence	Italy	
ℓ 512	15th	†Gospels^{esk}	αω	236	University of Messina, 58	Messina	Italy	
ℓ 513	12th	Gospels^{e}	αω	318	University of Messina, 65	Messina	Italy	
ℓ 514	10th	Gospels^{e}	ΑΩ	266	University of Messina, 66	Messina	Italy	
ℓ 515	12th	Gospels^{e}	αω	223	University of Messina, 73	Messina	Italy	
ℓ 516	13th	†Gospels^{esk}	αω	136	University of Messina, 75	Messina	Italy	
ℓ 517	12th	†Gospels^{esk}	αω	184	University of Messina, 94	Messina	Italy	
ℓ 518	13th	†Gospels^{esk}	αω	186	University of Messina, 95	Messina	Italy	
ℓ 519	12th	Gospels^{e}	αω	298	University of Messina, 96	Messina	Italy	INTF
ℓ 520	1184	Gospels^{e}	αω	285	University of Messina, 98	Messina	Italy	
ℓ 521	12th	Gospels^{esk}	αω P^{O}	119	University of Messina, 111	Messina	Italy	
ℓ 522	12th	†Gospels^{esk}	αω	146	University of Messina, 112	Messina	Italy	
ℓ 523	12th	Gospels + Apostles^{P}	αω	60	University of Messina, 150	Messina	Italy	
ℓ 524	12th	†Gospels^{esk}	αω	189	University of Messina, 170	Messina	Italy	
ℓ 525	8th	Gospels^{P}	ΑΩ	2	University of Messina, 175. II	Messina	Italy	
ℓ 526	10th	Gospels^{P}	ΑΩ	12	Fabroniana Library, 311	Pistoia	Italy	
ℓ 527	10th	Gospels^{P}	ΑΩ	3	Angelica Library, 106, fol. 4-6	Rome	Italy	
ℓ 528	15th	Gospels + Apostles^{Lit}	αω	254	Vatican Library, Barb. gr. 303	Vatican City	Vatican City	
ℓ 529	15th	Gospels + Apostles^{Lit}	αω	188	Vatican Library, Barb. gr. 410	Vatican City	Vatican City	
ℓ 530	15th	Gospels + Apostles^{Lit}	αω	386	Vatican Library, Barb. gr. 419	Vatican City	Vatican City	
ℓ 531	11th	Gospels^{Lit}	αω	145	Vatican Library, Barb. gr. 431	Vatican City	Vatican City	
ℓ 532	11th	Gospels + Apostles^{Lit}	αω	159	Vatican Library, Barb. gr. 443	Vatican City	Vatican City	
ℓ 533	12th	Gospels + Apostles^{Lit}	αω	206	Vatican Library, Barb. gr. 446	Vatican City	Vatican City	
ℓ 534	12th	Gospels^{esk}	αω	223	Vatican Library, Barb. gr. 448	Vatican City	Vatican City	INTF
ℓ 535	13th	Gospels^{esk}	αω	221	Vatican Library, Barb. gr. 461	Vatican City	Vatican City	DVL
ℓ 536	11th	Gospels^{esk}	αω	161	Vatican Library, Barb. gr. 471	Vatican City	Vatican City	
ℓ 537	12th	†Gospels^{e}	αω	248	Vatican Library, Barb. gr. 579	Vatican City	Vatican City	
ℓ 538	10th	Gospels^{sel}	ΑΩ	227	Vatican Library, Chis. R VII 52 (gr. 43)	Vatican City	Vatican City	
ℓ 539	11th	Gospels^{e}	αω	314	Vatican Library, Vat. gr. 350	Vatican City	Vatican City	DVL
ℓ 540	13th	Gospels^{esk}	αω	244	Vatican Library, Vat. gr. 352	Vatican City	Vatican City	DVL
ℓ 541	10th	†Gospels^{esk}	ΑΩ	237	Vatican Library, Vat. gr. 353	Vatican City	Vatican City	DVL
ℓ 542	10th	Gospels^{esk}	ΑΩ	315	Vatican Library, Vat. gr. 355	Vatican City	Vatican City	DVL
ℓ 543	10th	Gospels^{esk}	ΑΩ	322	Vatican Library, Vat. gr. 357	Vatican City	Vatican City	DVL
ℓ 544	11th	†Gospels^{esk}	αω	200	Vatican Library, Vat. gr. 362	Vatican City	Vatican City	DVL
ℓ 545	10th	Gospels^{P}	ΑΩ	4	Vatican Library, Vat. gr. 540, fol. 1. 2. 195. 196	Vatican City	Vatican City	INTF
ℓ 546	10th	Gospels^{esk}	αω	152	Vatican Library, Vat. gr. 781	Vatican City	Vatican City	
ℓ 547	13th	†Gospels^{esk}	αω	151	Vatican Library, Vat. gr. 1217	Vatican City	Vatican City	INTF
ℓ 548	14th	Gospels + Apostles^{Lit-P}	αω	34	Vatican Library, Vat. gr. 1228	Vatican City	Vatican City	DVL
ℓ 549	13th	Gospels^{esk}	αω	223	Vatican Library, Vat. gr. 1523	Vatican City	Vatican City	DVL
ℓ 550	12th	Gospels^{esk}	αω	192	Vatican Library, Vat. gr. 1601	Vatican City	Vatican City	INTF
ℓ 551	13th	Gospels^{e}	αω	361	Vatican Library, Vat. gr. 1625	Vatican City	Vatican City	INTF
ℓ 552	13th	Gospels^{Lit-P}	αω	266	Vatican Library, Vat. gr. 1813	Vatican City	Vatican City	DVL
ℓ 553	13th	†Gospels^{e}	αω	110	Vatican Library, Vat. gr. 1886	Vatican City	Vatican City	
ℓ 554	1373	Gospels + Apostles^{Sel}	αω P^{O}	34	Vatican Library, Vat. gr. 1973, fol. 24-57	Vatican City	Vatican City	DVL
ℓ 555	15th	Gospels + Apostles^{Lit-P}	αω	115	Vatican Library, Vat. gr. 1978	Vatican City	Vatican City	
ℓ 556	15th	Gospels + Apostles^{Lit}	αω	211	Vatican Library, Vat. gr. 2012	Vatican City	Vatican City	
ℓ 557	15th	Gospels + Apostles^{Lit}	αω	128	Vatican Library, Vat. gr. 2051	Vatican City	Vatican City	
ℓ 558	1561	Gospels + Apostles^{Lit}	αω	207	Vatican Library, Vat. gr. 2052	Vatican City	Vatican City	INTF
ℓ 559	8th	Gospels^{P}	ΑΩ P^{U}	7	Vatican Library, Vat. gr. 2061, fol. 164. 169. 174. 175. 209. 214. 227	Vatican City	Vatican City	DVL
ℓ 560	14th	†Gospels^{P-K}	αω P^{O}	79	Vatican Library, Vat. gr. 2100	Vatican City	Vatican City	
ℓ 561	16th	Gospels^{P}	αω	5	Vatican Library, Vat. gr. 2129, p. 1-10 (p. 17-158: 2064)	Vatican City	Vatican City	DVL
ℓ 562	991	Gospels^{P}	αω	91	Vatican Library, Vat. gr. 2138	Vatican City	Vatican City	DVL
ℓ 563	9th	Gospels^{esk}	ΑΩ	306	Vatican Library, Vat. gr. 2144	Vatican City	Vatican City	INTF
ℓ 564	14th	Gospels^{e}	αω	361	Vatican Library, Vat. gr. 2167	Vatican City	Vatican City	
ℓ 565	10th	Gospels^{P}	ΑΩ	4	Vatican Library, Vat. gr. 2251, fol. I.II.273.274	Vatican City	Vatican City	INTF
ℓ 566	11th	Gospels^{P}	ΑΩ	2	Vatican Library, Ottob. gr. 444, fol. A. B	Vatican City	Vatican City	INTF
ℓ 567	9th	Gospels^{P}	ΑΩ	2	Vatican Library, Pal. gr. 1	Vatican City	Vatican City	INTF
ℓ 568	15th	Gospels^{k-K}	αω	397	Vatican Library, Pal. gr. 221	Vatican City	Vatican City	
ℓ 569	16th	Gospels^{k-K}	αω	192	Vatican Library, Pal. gr. 239	Vatican City	Vatican City	
ℓ 570	10th	†Gospels^{esk}	αω	158	Vatican Library, Reg. gr. Pii II 33	Vatican City	Vatican City	INTF
ℓ 571	17th	Gospels^{K}	αω	356	Vatican Library, Reg. gr. 44	Vatican City	Vatican City	
ℓ 572	14th	Gospels + Apostles^{Lit}	αω	337	Vatican Library, Reg. gr. 49	Vatican City	Vatican City	
ℓ 573	12th	Gospels + Apostles^{Lit}	αω	137	Vatican Library, Reg. gr. 59	Vatican City	Vatican City	INTF
ℓ 574	1125	Gospels^{e}	αω	226	Alagoniana Library, 3	Syracuse	Italy	INTF
ℓ 575	15th	Gospels + Apostles^{Lit}	αω	218	Alagoniana Library, 4	Syracuse	Italy	
ℓ 576	12th	Gospels^{esk}	αω	205	San Lazzaro Library, 1612	Venice	Italy	
ℓ 577	17th	Gospels^{Lit-P}	αω	211	Dionysiou Monastery, 378	Mount Athos	Greece	
ℓ 578	11th	Gospels^{e}	αω	252	University Library, Ms. 222 (D Laing 9)	Edinburgh	United Kingdom	CSNTM
ℓ 579	13th	Gospels^{e(sk)}	αω	230	Aristotle University, Ms. 81	Thessaloniki	Greece	CSNTM
ℓ 580	9th	†Gospels^{esk}	αω	103	Formerly, Skete of St. Andrew (destroyed)	Athos	Greece	
ℓ 581	16th	Gospels^{e}	αω	?	Formerly, Skete of St. Andrew (destroyed)	Athos	Greece	
ℓ 582	14th	†Gospels^{esk}	αω	125	Formerly, Skete of St. Andrew (destroyed)	Athos	Greece	
ℓ 583	13th	Apostles^{esk}	αω	141	Library of Study and Conservation, Ms. 42	Besançon	France	
ℓ 584	14th	†Apostles^{esk}	αω	115	National Library, Supplement Grec 800	Paris	France	BnF
ℓ 585	15th	Apostles^{e}	αω	180	Estense Library, G. 102, a.T.8.7 (II D 3)	Modena	Italy	
ℓ 586	10th	Apostles^{P}	ΑΩ P^{U}	17	University of Birmingham Cadbury Research Library, Cod. Peckov. Gr. 7, fol. 1-3, 352-365	Birmingham	United Kingdom	
ℓ 587	12th	Apostles^{e}	αω	218	National Library of Greece, 205	Athens	Greece	CSNTM
ℓ 588	1485	Apostles^{e}	αω	347	National Library of Greece, 206	Athens	Greece	CSNTM
ℓ 589	15th	Apostles^{e}	αω	217	National Library of Greece, 90	Athens	Greece	CSNTM
ℓ 590	11th	†Apostles^{e}	αω	169	National Library of Greece, 101	Athens	Greece	CSNTM
ℓ 590	11th	†Apostles^{e}	αω	169	National Library of Greece, 101	Athens	Greece	CSNTM
ℓ 591	11th	†Apostles^{e}	αω	243	National Library of Greece, 106	Athens	Greece	CSNTM
ℓ 592	1576	†Apostles^{e}	αω	187	National Library of Greece, 115	Athens	Greece	CSNTM
ℓ 593	15th	Apostles^{e}	αω	229	National Library of Greece, 102	Athens	Greece	CSNTM
ℓ 594	15th	Apostles^{esk}	αω	190	National Library of Greece, 114	Athens	Greece	CSNTM
ℓ 595	15th	†Apostles^{esk}	αω	64	Royal Site of San Lorenzo de El Escorial, W. IV. 22, fol. 1-64	San Lorenzo de El Escorial	Spain	
ℓ 596	1146	Apostles^{sel}	αω	136	Royal Site of San Lorenzo de El Escorial, Y. III. 9	San Lorenzo de El Escorial	Spain	
ℓ 597	10th	Apostles^{esk}	αω	140	Exarchist Monastery of Saint Mary, A. b. 4	Grottaferrata	Italy	
ℓ 598	11th	Apostles^{esk}	αω	245	Exarchist Monastery of Saint Mary, A. b. 5	Grottaferrata	Italy	CSNTM
ℓ 599	11th	†Apostles^{esk}	αω	64	Exarchist Monastery of Saint Mary, A. b. 7	Grottaferrata	Italy	CSNTM
ℓ 600	14th	†Apostles^{esk}	αω	127	Exarchist Monastery of Saint Mary, A. b. 8	Grottaferrata	Italy	

[top]

=== Lectionaries 601–700 ===
#	Date	Contents	Script	Pages	Institution	City, State	Country	Images
ℓ 601	12th	†Apostles^{esk}	αω	104	Exarchist Monastery of Saint Mary, A. b. 9	Grottaferrata	Italy	
ℓ 602	13th	Apostles^{P}	αω	16	Exarchist Monastery of Saint Mary, Z. d. 118, fol. 90-105	Grottaferrata	Italy	
ℓ 603	11th	Apostles^{e}	αω	192	Exarchist Monastery of Saint Mary, A. b. 11	Grottaferrata	Italy	
ℓ 604	12th	†Apostles^{e}	αω	217	Laurentian Library, S. Marco 704	Florence	Italy	CSNTM
ℓ 605	13th	Apostles^{P}	αω	29	Ambrosiana Library, C. 16. inf.	Milan	Italy	
ℓ 606	12th	Apostles^{e}	αω P^{O}	331	University of Messina, 93	Messina	Italy	
ℓ 607	1556	†Apostles^{esk}	αω	158	Vatican Library, Barb. gr. 429	Vatican City	Vatican City	
ℓ 608	12th	†Apostles^{e}	αω	322	Vatican Library, Barb. gr. 478	Vatican City	Vatican City	DVL
ℓ 609	12th	†Apostles^{e}	αω	185	Vatican Library, Barb. gr. 502	Vatican City	Vatican City	
ℓ 610	15th	Apostles^{e}	αω	271	Saint Catherine's Monastery, Gr. 295	Sinai	Egypt	CSNTM
ℓ 611	13th	†Apostles^{esk}	αω	136	Vatican Library, Vat. gr. 368	Vatican City	Vatican City	DVL
ℓ 612	14th	Apostles^{e}	αω	226	Vatican Library, Vat. gr. 369	Vatican City	Vatican City	
ℓ 613	12th	†Apostles^{e}	αω	232	Vatican Library, Vat. gr. 2068	Vatican City	Vatican City	DVL
ℓ 614	13th	†Apostles^{esk}	αω	111	Vatican Library, Vat. gr. 2116	Vatican City	Vatican City	
ℓ 615	15th	Apostles^{esk}	αω	149	Vatican Library, Pal. gr. 241	Vatican City	Vatican City	
ℓ 616	12th	†Apostles^{e}	αω	168	Vatican Library, Reg. gr. 11	Vatican City	Vatican City	INTF
ℓ 617	11th	Apostles^{e}	αω	280	Marciana National Library, Gr. II,115 (1058), fol. 1-280	Venice	Italy	
ℓ 618	14th	†Apostles^{e}	αω	367	Marciana National Library, Gr. II,128 (1216)	Venice	Italy	
ℓ 619	16th	Apostles^{ek}	αω	121	Osiou Gregoriou Monastery, 60	Mount Athos	Greece	
ℓ 620	1542	Apostles^{e}	αω	343	Dionysiou Monastery, 386	Mount Athos	Greece	
ℓ 621	17th	†Apostles^{e}	αω	246	Dionysiou Monastery, 387	Mount Athos	Greece	
ℓ 622	16th	†Apostles^{e}	αω	305	Dionysiou Monastery, 392	Mount Athos	Greece	
ℓ 623	13th	†Apostles^{e}	αω	25	Russian Academy of Sciences Historical Institute, Dmitr. 13b	Saint Petersburg	Russia	
ℓ 623	13th	†Apostles^{e}	αω	18	Docheiariou Monastery, 17	Mount Athos	Greece	
ℓ 624	12th	†Apostles^{e}	αω	216	Docheiariou Monastery, 20	Mount Athos	Greece	
ℓ 625	12th	†Apostles^{e}	αω	239	Docheiariou Monastery, 27	Mount Athos	Greece	
ℓ 626	17th	†Apostles^{esk}	αω	275	Docheiariou Monastery, 141	Mount Athos	Greece	
ℓ 627	8th	Gospels^{esk}	ΑΩ	237	Dionysiou Monastery, 1	Mount Athos	Greece	INTF
ℓ 628	10th	Gospels^{esk}	αω	220	Dionysiou Monastery, 2	Mount Athos	Greece	INTF
ℓ 629	12th	†Gospels^{esk}	αω	146	Dionysiou Monastery, 3	Mount Athos	Greece	INTF
ℓ 630	13th	†Gospels^{esk}	αω	110	Dionysiou Monastery, 6	Mount Athos	Greece	INTF
ℓ 631	12th	†Gospels^{esk}	αω	152	Dionysiou Monastery, 11	Mount Athos	Greece	INTF
ℓ 632	13th	Gospels^{e}	αω	382	Dionysiou Monastery, 13	Mount Athos	Greece	INTF
ℓ 633	11th	†Gospels^{e}	αω	237	Dionysiou Monastery, 14	Mount Athos	Greece	INTF
ℓ 634	12th	†Gospels^{e}	αω	314	Dionysiou Monastery, 15	Mount Athos	Greece	INTF
ℓ 635	12th	Gospels^{e}	αω	323	Dionysiou Monastery, 16	Mount Athos	Greece	INTF
ℓ 636	12th	Gospels^{e}	αω	315	Dionysiou Monastery, 17	Mount Athos	Greece	INTF
ℓ 637	12th	Gospels^{P}	αω	98	Dionysiou Monastery, 18	Mount Athos	Greece	INTF
ℓ 638	11th	Gospels^{e}	αω	292	Dionysiou Monastery, 19	Mount Athos	Greece	INTF
ℓ 639	12th	Gospels^{e}	αω	300	Dionysiou Monastery, 20	Mount Athos	Greece	INTF
ℓ 640	9th	Gospels^{esk}	ΑΩ	258	Dionysiou Monastery, 21	Mount Athos	Greece	INTF
ℓ 641	12th	Gospels^{P}	αω	44	Dionysiou Monastery, 85	Mount Athos	Greece	INTF
ℓ 642	16th	Matthew 10:5-8, 14:1-13; Luke 10:16-17, 38-42, 11:27-28; John 19:25-26; Acts 13:31-32; 1 Corinthians 1:18-24; Philippians 2:5-11; Hebrews 2:7-10	αω	4	Dionysiou Monastery, 163, fol. A. 1-3	Mount Athos	Greece	INTF
ℓ 643	1655	Gospels^{e}	αω	334	Owner Unknown			
ℓ 644	1559	Gospels^{e}	αω	301	Dionysiou Monastery, 303	Mount Athos	Greece	INTF
ℓ 645	17th	Gospels^{e}	αω	371	Dionysiou Monastery, 304	Mount Athos	Greece	
ℓ 646	17th	Gospels^{e}	αω	244	Dionysiou Monastery, 305	Mount Athos	Greece	
ℓ 647	17th	Gospels^{e}	αω	347	Dionysiou Monastery, 306	Mount Athos	Greece	
ℓ 648	16th	Gospels^{esk}	αω	232	Duke University, Greek MS 028	Durham, NC	United States	
ℓ 649	15th	Gospels^{e}	αω	257	Dionysiou Monastery, 308	Mount Athos	Greece	
ℓ 650	1395	Gospels^{e}	αω	262	Dionysiou Monastery, 309	Mount Athos	Greece	
ℓ 651	12th	Gospels^{e}	αω	371	Docheiariou Monastery, 1	Mount Athos	Greece	
[ℓ 652]								
ℓ 653	1276	Gospels^{e}	αω	270	Docheiariou Monastery, 13, fol. 2-271	Mount Athos	Greece	
ℓ 653	1276	Gospels^{e}	αω	1	Russian National Library, Gr. 310	Saint Petersburg	Russia	
ℓ 654	12th	†Gospels^{e}	αω	279	Docheiariou Monastery, 14	Mount Athos	Greece	
ℓ 655	13th	Gospels^{e}	αω	241	Docheiariou Monastery, 15	Mount Athos	Greece	
ℓ 656	13th	†Gospels^{esk}	αω	206	Docheiariou Monastery, 19	Mount Athos	Greece	
ℓ 657	12th	Gospels^{esk}	αω	153	Docheiariou Monastery, 23	Mount Athos	Greece	
ℓ 658	11th	†Gospels^{esk}	αω	257	Docheiariou Monastery, 24	Mount Athos	Greece	
ℓ 659	11th	Gospels^{esk}	αω	246	Docheiariou Monastery, 36	Mount Athos	Greece	
[ℓ 660]								
ℓ 661	15th	†Gospels^{e}	αω	239	Docheiariou Monastery, 137	Mount Athos	Greece	
ℓ 662	11th	Gospels^{esk}	αω	205	Esphigmenou Monastery, 19	Mount Athos	Greece	
ℓ 663	11th	Gospels^{e}	αω	296	Esphigmenou Monastery, 20	Mount Athos	Greece	INTF
ℓ 664	12th	Gospels^{e}	αω	242	Esphigmenou Monastery, 21	Mount Athos	Greece	
ℓ 665	12th	Gospels^{e}	αω	220	Esphigmenou Monastery, 22	Mount Athos	Greece	
ℓ 666	11th	Gospels^{e}	αω	230	Esphigmenou Monastery, 23	Mount Athos	Greece	
ℓ 667	11th	Gospels^{esk}	αω	193	Esphigmenou Monastery, 24	Mount Athos	Greece	
ℓ 668	9th	Gospels	ΑΩ P^{U}	175	Esphigmenou Monastery, 27	Mount Athos	Greece	
ℓ 669	14th	†Gospels^{e}	αω	272	Esphigmenou Monastery, 28	Mount Athos	Greece	
ℓ 670	12th	†Gospels^{e}	αω	182	Esphigmenou Monastery, 35	Mount Athos	Greece	
ℓ 671	13th	†Gospels	αω	84	Esphigmenou Monastery, 60	Mount Athos	Greece	
ℓ 672	9th	Gospels^{esk}	ΑΩ	312	Iviron Monastery, 1	Mount Athos	Greece	INTF
ℓ 673	12th	†Gospels^{e}	αω	298	Iviron Monastery, 3	Mount Athos	Greece	
ℓ 674	14th	Gospels^{esk}	αω	205	Iviron Monastery, 4	Mount Athos	Greece	
ℓ 675	12th	Gospels^{sel}	αω	269	Iviron Monastery, 6	Mount Athos	Greece	
ℓ 676	13th	Gospels^{esk}	αω	164	Iviron Monastery, 20	Mount Athos	Greece	
ℓ 677	1205	†Gospels^{esk}	αω	186	Iviron Monastery, 23	Mount Athos	Greece	
ℓ 678	14th	Gospels^{esk}	αω	145	Iviron Monastery, 35	Mount Athos	Greece	
ℓ 679	1201	Gospels^{esk}	αω	209	Iviron Monastery, 305	Mount Athos	Greece	
ℓ 680	13th	Gospels + Apostles^{e}	αω	262	Iviron Monastery, 245	Mount Athos	Greece	INTF, Library of Congress
ℓ 681	1642	Gospels + Apostles^{Lit}	αω	322	Iviron Monastery, 826	Mount Athos	Greece	
ℓ 682	14th	†Gospels^{esk}	αω	299	Iviron Monastery, 637	Mount Athos	Greece	
ℓ 683	15th	†Gospels^{e}	αω	350	Iviron Monastery, 638	Mount Athos	Greece	
ℓ 684	16th	Gospels^{esk}	αω	228	Iviron Monastery, 639	Mount Athos	Greece	
ℓ 685	16th	†Gospels^{esk}	αω	197	Iviron Monastery, 640	Mount Athos	Greece	
ℓ 686	16th	†Gospels + Apostles	αω	191	Iviron Monastery, 825	Mount Athos	Greece	
ℓ 687	16th	Gospels + Apostles^{sel}	αω	76	Iviron Monastery, 884	Mount Athos	Greece	
ℓ 688	14th	†Gospels^{e}	αω	336	Karakallou Monastery, 10	Mount Athos	Greece	
ℓ 689	10th/11th (?)	Gospels^{esk}	ΑΩ	228	Karakallou Monastery, 11	Mount Athos	Greece	MAR
ℓ 690	13th	Gospels^{e}	αω	251	Karakallou Monastery, 15	Mount Athos	Greece	
ℓ 691	13th	†Gospels^{esk}	αω	103	Karakallou Monastery, 16	Mount Athos	Greece	MAR
ℓ 692	1232	Gospels^{sk}	αω	241	Karakallou Monastery, 17	Mount Athos	Greece	
ℓ 693	15th	Gospels^{Lit}	αω	28	Iviron Monastery, 880	Mount Athos	Greece	
ℓ 694	14th	Gospels^{e}	αω	325	Konstamonitou Monastery, 98	Mount Athos	Greece	
ℓ 695	14th	Gospels^{esk}	αω P^{O}	153	Konstamonitou Monastery, 99	Mount Athos	Greece	
ℓ 696	12th	Gospels^{esk}	αω	256	Koutloumousiou Monastery, 60	Mount Athos	Greece	
ℓ 697	12th	†Gospels^{esk}	αω	278	Koutloumousiou Monastery, 61	Mount Athos	Greece	
ℓ 698	13th	Gospels^{e}	αω	288	Koutloumousiou Monastery, 62	Mount Athos	Greece	INTF
ℓ 699	12th	Gospels^{esk}	αω	337	Koutloumousiou Monastery, 63	Mount Athos	Greece	
ℓ 700	12th	Gospels^{e}	αω	238	Koutloumousiou Monastery, 64	Mount Athos	Greece	

[top]

=== Lectionaries 701–800 ===
#	Date	Contents	Script	Pages	Institution	City, State	Country	Images
ℓ 701	12th	†Gospels^{e}	αω	306	Koutloumousiou Monastery, 65	Mount Athos	Greece	
ℓ 702	11th	Gospels^{esk}	αω	165	Koutloumousiou Monastery, 66	Mount Athos	Greece	
ℓ 703	9th	Gospels^{P}	ΑΩ P^{U}	41	Koutloumousiou Monastery, 86	Mount Athos	Greece	
ℓ 704	10th	Gospels^{esk}	ΑΩ	247	Koutloumousiou Monastery, 90	Mount Athos	Greece	INTF
ℓ 705	12th	†Gospels^{e}	αω	226	Konstamonitou Monastery, 100	Mount Athos	Greece	
ℓ 706	16th	†Gospels^{e}	αω	133	Koutloumousiou Monastery, 280	Mount Athos	Greece	
ℓ 707	16th	Gospels + Apostles^{k}	αω	292	Koutloumousiou Monastery, 282	Mount Athos	Greece	
ℓ 708	16th	Gospels^{e}	αω	271	Koutloumousiou Monastery, 292	Mount Athos	Greece	
ℓ 709	11th	†Gospels^{esk}	αω	163	Xenophontos Monastery, 3	Mount Athos	Greece	MAR
ℓ 710	1181	Gospels^{esk}	αω	101	Xenophontos Monastery, 1	Mount Athos	Greece	MAR
ℓ 710	1181	Gospels^{esk}	αω	1	Russian National Library, Gr. 298	Saint Petersburg	Russia	
ℓ 711	16th	Gospels^{esk}	αω	235	Xenophontos Monastery, 58	Mount Athos	Greece	
ℓ 712	16th	Gospels + Apostles^{Lit}	αω	134	Xenophontos Monastery, 59	Mount Athos	Greece	
ℓ 713	18th	Gospels^{Lit-P}	αω	66	Xenophontos Monastery, 68	Mount Athos	Greece	
ℓ 714	13th	†Gospels^{esk}	αω	155	Xeropotamou Monastery, 110	Mount Athos	Greece	
ℓ 715	13th	†Gospels^{(e)sk}	αω	230	Xeropotamou Monastery, 112	Mount Athos	Greece	
ℓ 716	12th	Gospels^{P}	αω	3	State Library, 10	Vytina	Greece	
ℓ 716	12th	Gospels^{P}	αω	62	Xeropotamou Monastery, 118	Mount Athos	Greece	
ℓ 716	12th	Gospels^{P}	αω	2	St. Panteleimon Monastery, 97,3	Mount Athos	Greece	
ℓ 716	12th	Gospels^{P}	αω	2	Agios Lavrentios Church, Σπ	Pelion	Greece	
ℓ 717	16th	Gospels^{e}	αω	401	Xeropotamou Monastery, 122	Mount Athos	Greece	INTF
ℓ 718	1654	Gospels^{e}	αω	275	Xeropotamou Monastery, 125	Mount Athos	Greece	
ℓ 719	1586	Gospels^{e}	αω	366	Xeropotamou Monastery, 126	Mount Athos	Greece	INTF
ℓ 720	9th	Gospels^{P}	ΑΩ	2	Xeropotamou Monastery, 234	Mount Athos	Greece	
ℓ 721	17th	Gospels + Apostles^{Lit}	αω	71	Xeropotamou Monastery, 247	Mount Athos	Greece	
ℓ 722	10th	Gospels^{P}	ΑΩ	21	St. Panteleimon Monastery, 62	Mount Athos	Greece	
ℓ 723	12th	Gospels^{(e)sk}	αω	171	St. Panteleimon Monastery, 4	Mount Athos	Greece	
ℓ 724	12th/ 13th	†Gospels^{e}	αω	249	St. Panteleimon Monastery, 1	Mount Athos	Greece	
ℓ 725	12th	Gospels^{(es)k}	αω	256	St. Panteleimon Monastery, 2	Mount Athos	Greece	
ℓ 726	12th	Gospels^{e}	αω	301	St. Panteleimon Monastery, 3	Mount Athos	Greece	
ℓ 727	14th	Gospels^{esk}	αω	236	St. Panteleimon Monastery, 32	Mount Athos	Greece	
ℓ 728	13th	Gospels^{P}	αω	50	Agiou Pavlou Monastery, 1	Mount Athos	Greece	
ℓ 729	12th	Gospels^{e}	αω	281	Church of Protaton, 11	Mount Athos	Greece	MAR
ℓ 730	9th	Gospels^{P}	ΑΩ	2	Church of Protaton, 13	Mount Athos	Greece	
ℓ 731	11th	Gospels^{e}	αω	267	Church of Protaton, 15	Mount Athos	Greece	MAR
ℓ 732	14th	Gospels^{e}	αω	278	Church of Protaton, 44	Mount Athos	Greece	
ℓ 733	18th	Gospels^{Lit-P}	αω	74	Osiou Gregoriou Monastery, 71	Mount Athos	Greece	
ℓ 734	9th	Gospels^{P}	ΑΩ	3	Church of Protaton, 14, fol. 1.2.246	Mount Athos	Greece	
ℓ 735	9th	Gospels^{esk}	ΑΩ	234	Church of Protaton, 20	Mount Athos	Greece	MAR
ℓ 736	16th	Gospels + Apostles^{Lit}	αω	?	Philotheou Monastery, 213	Mount Athos	Greece	
ℓ 737	16th	Gospels + Apostles^{Lit}	αω	10	Hilandar Monastery, 15	Mount Athos	Greece	
ℓ 738	1524	Apostles^{esk}	αω	150	Docheiariou Monastery, 146	Mount Athos	Greece	
ℓ 739	16th	†Apostles^{e}	αω	247	Iviron Monastery, 831	Mount Athos	Greece	
ℓ 740	11th	†Apostles^{e}	αω	183	Karakallou Monastery, 3	Mount Athos	Greece	
ℓ 741	15th	Apostles^{esk}	αω	160	Karakallou Monastery, 66	Mount Athos	Greece	
ℓ 742	17th	†Apostles^{e}	αω	346	Konstamonitou Monastery, 21	Mount Athos	Greece	
ℓ 743	14th	†Apostles^{e}	αω	338	Konstamonitou Monastery, 22	Mount Athos	Greece	
ℓ 744	14th	†Gospels^{e}	αω	305	Stavronikita Monastery, 1	Mount Athos	Greece	MAR
ℓ 745	14th	Gospels^{e}	αω	337	Stavronikita Monastery, 27	Mount Athos	Greece	MAR
ℓ 746	13th	Gospels^{esk}	αω	166	Stavronikita Monastery, 42	Mount Athos	Greece	MAR
ℓ 747	1319	Gospels + Apostles^{esk}	αω	187	Stavronikita Monastery, 102	Mount Athos	Greece	
ℓ 748	13th	Gospels^{e}	αω	351	Philotheou Monastery, 1	Mount Athos	Greece	
ℓ 749	9th	Gospels^{P}	ΑΩ	36	Philotheou Monastery, 2	Mount Athos	Greece	
ℓ 750	13th	Gospels^{e}	αω	323	Philotheou Monastery, 3	Mount Athos	Greece	
ℓ 751	11th	†Gospels + Apostles^{esk}	αω	344	Philotheou Monastery, 6	Mount Athos	Greece	
ℓ 752	12th	†Gospels^{e}	αω	332	Philotheou Monastery, 18	Mount Athos	Greece	
ℓ 753	14th	Apostles^{skl}	αω	202	Philotheou Monastery, 25	Mount Athos	Greece	
ℓ 754	1583	Gospels^{e}	αω	209	Philotheou Monastery, 61	Mount Athos	Greece	
ℓ 755	15th	Gospels^{Lit}	αω	164	Philotheou Monastery, 1889 (125)	Mount Athos	Greece	
ℓ 756	13th	Gospels^{esk}	αω	107	Hilandar Monastery, 6	Mount Athos	Greece	
ℓ 757	14th	Gospels^{sel}	αω	188	Hilandar Monastery, 105	Mount Athos	Greece	
ℓ 758	11th	Gospels	αω	310	Owner unknown			
ℓ 759	1521	Gospels + Apostles^{Lit}	αω	430	Greek Orthodox Patriarchate, 222	Alexandria	Egypt	
ℓ 760	14th	Gospels^{esk}	αω	171	Greek Orthodox Patriarchate, 45	Alexandria	Egypt	
ℓ 761	14th	†Gospels^{esk}	αω	312	Greek Orthodox Patriarchate, 45	Alexandria	Egypt	
ℓ 761	14th	†Gospels^{esk}	αω	1	Russian National Library, Gr. 397	Saint Petersburg	Russia	
ℓ 762	14th	Gospels^{esk}	αω	421	Greek Orthodox Patriarchate, 163	Alexandria	Egypt	
ℓ 763	14th	Gospels^{e}	αω	396	Greek Orthodox Patriarchate, 9	Alexandria	Egypt	
ℓ 764	12th	†Gospels^{(e)sk}	αω	207	Greek Orthodox Patriarchate, 55	Alexandria	Egypt	
ℓ 765	13th	Gospels^{e}	αω	253	Greek Orthodox Patriarchate, 17	Alexandria	Egypt	
ℓ 766	12th	†Gospels^{e}	αω	256	Greek Orthodox Patriarchate, 53, fol. 5-260	Alexandria	Egypt	
ℓ 767	14th	Gospels^{esk}	αω	324	Greek Orthodox Patriarchate, 85	Alexandria	Egypt	
ℓ 768	11th	†Gospels^{e}	αω	269	Greek Orthodox Patriarchate, 59	Alexandria	Egypt	INTF
ℓ 769	14th	Gospels^{esk}	αω	216	Greek Orthodox Patriarchate, 54	Alexandria	Egypt	
ℓ 770	10th	Gospels^{e}	αω	330	Ecumenical Patriarchate, Triados 1	Istanbul	Turkey	CSNTM
ℓ 771	?	Gospels	αω	?	Ecumenical Patriarchate, Chalki, Triados, 2	Istanbul	Turkey	
ℓ 772	?	Gospels	αω	?	Ecumenical Patriarchate, Chalki, Triados, 3	Istanbul	Turkey	
ℓ 773	11th	Gospels^{e}	αω	247	Ecumenical Patriarchate, Triados 4 (2)	Istanbul	Turkey	CSNTM
ℓ 774	1188	Gospels^{esk}	αω	155	Ecumenical Patriarchate, Triados 5 (3)	Istanbul	Turkey	CSNTM
ℓ 775	15th	Gospels^{esk}	αω	150	Ecumenical Patriarchate, Chalki, Triados, 6	Istanbul	Turkey	
ℓ 776	14th	Gospels^{e}	αω	435	Ecumenical Patriarchate, Chalki, Triados, 7	Istanbul	Turkey	
ℓ 777	13th	Gospels^{esk}	αω	123	Ecumenical Patriarchate, Triados 8 (6)	Istanbul	Turkey	CSNTM
ℓ 778	14th	Gospels^{e}	αω	158	Ecumenical Patriarchate, Chalki, Triados, 9	Istanbul	Turkey	
ℓ 779	1403	Gospels^{esk}	αω	288	Ecumenical Patriarchate, Triados 10 (8)	Istanbul	Turkey	CSNTM
ℓ 780	13th	Gospels^{esk}	αω	324	Ecumenical Patriarchate, Theological School of Chalki, 1	Istanbul	Turkey	
ℓ 781	14th	Gospels^{esk}	αω	193	Ecumenical Patriarchate, Theological School of Chalki, 2	Istanbul	Turkey	
ℓ 782	12th	Gospels^{esk}	αω	159	Ecumenical Patriarchate, Theological School of Chalki 3	Istanbul	Turkey	CSNTM
ℓ 783	1542	Gospels^{e}	αω	245	Ecumenical Patriarchate, Theological School of Chalki 4	Istanbul	Turkey	INTF
ℓ 784	11th	Gospels^{esk}	αω	132	Ecumenical Patriarchate, Theological School of Chalki 5	Istanbul	Turkey	CSNTM
ℓ 785	14th	Gospels^{esk}	αω	124	Ecumenical Patriarchate, Theological School of Chalki 6	Istanbul	Turkey	CSNTM
ℓ 786	13th	Gospels^{esk}	αω	199	Ecumenical Patriarchate, Theological School of Chalki 7	Istanbul	Turkey	CSNTM
ℓ 787	12th	†Gospels^{e}	αω	262	Ecumenical Patriarchate, Kamariotissis 12	Istanbul	Turkey	CSNTM
ℓ 788	14th	Gospels^{esk}	αω	130	Ecumenical Patriarchate, Theological School of Chalki 76	Istanbul	Turkey	
ℓ 789	14th	Gospels^{esk}	αω	267	Ecumenical Patriarchate, Kamariotissis 84 (81)	Istanbul	Turkey	CSNTM
ℓ 790	13th	Gospels^{esk}	αω	334	Ecumenical Patriarchate, Skevophylakion, 2	Istanbul	Turkey	
ℓ 791	13th	Gospels^{e}	αω	416	Ecumenical Patriarchate, Skevophylakion, 1	Istanbul	Turkey	INTF
ℓ 792	13th	Gospels^{e}	αω	369	National Library of Greece	Athens	Greece	INTF
ℓ 793	12th	Gospels^{esk}	αω	227	University of Toronto The Thomas Fisher Rare Book Library, MSS 05316	Toronto	Canada	UoT
ℓ 794	12th	Gospels^{e}	αω	376	National Library of Greece	Athens	Greece	
ℓ 795	13th	Gospels^{e}	αω	257	National Library of Greece	Athens	Greece	
ℓ 796	15th	†Gospels^{esk}	αω	249	Turkish Historical Society, 48	Ankara	Turkey	
ℓ 797	13th	Gospels^{esk}	αω	148	Greek Orthodox Patriarchate, 56	Alexandria	Egypt	
ℓ 798	10th	†Gospels^{esk}	ΑΩ	79	Leimonos Monastery, 1	Kalloni, Lesbos	Greece	LM
ℓ 799	10th	Gospels^{esk}	αω	288	Leimonos Monastery, 37	Kalloni, Lesbos	Greece	LM
ℓ 800	11th	Gospels^{e}	αω	319	Leimonos Monastery, 38	Kalloni, Lesbos	Greece	LM

[top]

=== Lectionaries 801–900 ===
#	Date	Contents	Script	Pages	Institution	City, State	Country	Images
ℓ 801	14th	Gospels^{e}	αω	355	Leimonos Monastery, 40	Kalloni, Lesbos	Greece	LM
ℓ 802	12th	Gospels^{e}	αω	221	Leimonos Monastery, 41	Kalloni, Lesbos	Greece	LM
ℓ 803	12th	Gospels^{e}	αω	428	Leimonos Monastery, 66	Kalloni, Lesbos	Greece	LM
ℓ 804	13th	Gospels^{P}	αω	81	Greek Orthodox Patriarchate, 314	Alexandria	Egypt	
ℓ 805	9th	Gospels^{esk}	ΑΩ	287	Monastery of Saint John the Theologian, 68	Patmos	Greece	INTF
ℓ 806	9th	Gospels^{esk}	ΑΩ	205	Monastery of Saint John the Theologian, 69	Patmos	Greece	INTF
ℓ 807	9th	Gospels^{esk}	ΑΩ	295	Monastery of Saint John the Theologian, MS 70	Patmos	Greece	CSNTM
ℓ 808	9th	Gospels^{esk}	ΑΩ	185	Monastery of Saint John the Theologian, 71	Patmos	Greece	
ℓ 809	12th	Apostles^{e}	αω	286	Saint Catherine's Monastery, Gr. 286	Sinai	Egypt	CSNTM
ℓ 810	12th	Gospels^{e}	αω	330	Monastery of Saint John the Theologian, 73	Patmos	Greece	
ℓ 811	12th	Gospels^{e}	αω	342	Monastery of Saint John the Theologian, 74	Patmos	Greece	
ℓ 812	12th	Gospels^{e}	αω	293	Monastery of Saint John the Theologian, 75	Patmos	Greece	
ℓ 813	1069	Gospels^{e}	αω	331	Monastery of Saint John the Theologian, 77	Patmos	Greece	
ℓ 814	10th	Gospels^{esk}	αω	183	Monastery of Saint John the Theologian, 78	Patmos	Greece	
ℓ 815	11th	Gospels^{esk}	αω	315	Monastery of Saint John the Theologian, 79	Patmos	Greece	
ℓ 816	11th	†Gospels^{esk}	αω	210	Monastery of Saint John the Theologian, 85	Patmos	Greece	
ℓ 817	11th	†Gospels^{esk}	αω	175	Monastery of Saint John the Theologian, 86	Patmos	Greece	
ℓ 818	13th	Gospels^{P}	αω	18	Greek Orthodox Patriarchate, 1	Alexandria	Egypt	
ℓ 819	13th	Gospels^{e}	αω	296	Monastery of Saint John the Theologian, 88	Patmos	Greece	
ℓ 820	14th	†Gospels^{esk}	αω	144	Monastery of Saint John the Theologian, 89	Patmos	Greece	
ℓ 821	12th	†Gospels^{e}	αω	205	Monastery of Saint John the Theologian, 91	Patmos	Greece	
ℓ 822	1205	Gospels^{e}	αω	252	Monastery of Saint John the Theologian, 93	Patmos	Greece	
ℓ 823	10th	Gospels^{esk}	ΑΩ	195	Monastery of Saint John the Theologian, 99	Patmos	Greece	
ℓ 824	14th	†Gospels^{esk}	αω	123	Monastery of Saint John the Theologian, 101	Patmos	Greece	
ℓ 825	1427	Gospels^{esk}	αω	283	Monastery of Saint John the Theologian, 330	Patmos	Greece	
ℓ 826	15th	Gospels^{e}	αω	241	Monastery of Saint John the Theologian, 331	Patmos	Greece	
ℓ 827	1443	Gospels^{e}	αω	333	Monastery of Saint John the Theologian, 332	Patmos	Greece	INTF
ℓ 828	12th	Gospels^{P}	αω	6	Greek Orthodox Patriarchate, 12, fol. 358-363	Alexandria	Egypt	
ℓ 829	14th	Gospels^{P}	αω	7	Greek Orthodox Patriarchate, 60	Alexandria	Egypt	
ℓ 830	9th	†Gospels^{esk}	ΑΩ	87	Byzantine and Christian Museum, 159	Athens	Greece	
ℓ 831	14th	†Gospels^{e}	αω	161	National Library of Greece, 2054	Athens	Greece	
ℓ 832	15th	†Gospels^{e}	αω	273	National Library of Greece, NLG 2116	Athens	Greece	CSNTM
ℓ 833	14th	†Gospels^{e}	αω	322	St. Panteleimon Monastery, 5	Mount Athos	Greece	
ℓ 834	12th	†Gospels^{esk}	αω	185	St. Panteleimon Monastery, 30	Mount Athos	Greece	
ℓ 835	1072	Gospels^{e}	αω	293	St. Panteleimon Monastery, 27	Mount Athos	Greece	
ℓ 836	1340	Gospels^{k}	αω	231	National Library of Greece, NLG 2115	Athens	Greece	CSNTM
ℓ 837	15th	Gospels + Apostles^{P}	αω	300	National Library of Greece, NLG 2044	Athens	Greece	CSNTM
ℓ 838	1185	Gospels^{e}	αω	252	Owner Unknown			
ℓ 839	15th	Apostles^{esk}	αω	224	Konstamonitou Monastery, 23	Mount Athos	Greece	
ℓ 840	12th	Apostles^{e}	αω	160	Konstamonitou Monastery, 101	Mount Athos	Greece	
ℓ 840	12th	Apostles^{e}	αω	16	Russian Academy of Sciences Historical Institute, Dmitr. 13a	Saint Petersburg	Russia	
ℓ 841	1555	Apostles^{e}	αω	233	Koutloumousiou Monastery, 277	Mount Athos	Greece	
ℓ 842	15th	Apostles^{esk}	αω	153	Koutloumousiou Monastery, 354	Mount Athos	Greece	
ℓ 843	17th	Apostles^{esk}	αω	140	Koutloumousiou Monastery, 355	Mount Athos	Greece	
ℓ 844	862	†Gospels^{sel}	ΑΩ	188	Saint Catherine's Monastery, Gr. 210	Sinai	Egypt	CSNTM
ℓ 845	9th	Gospels^{esk}	ΑΩ	253	Saint Catherine's Monastery, Gr. 211	Sinai	Egypt	CSNTM
ℓ 846	9th	Gospels + Apostles^{sel}	ΑΩ P^{O}	114	Saint Catherine's Monastery, Gr. 212	Sinai	Egypt	CSNTM
ℓ 847	967	Gospels^{esk}	ΑΩ	339	Saint Catherine's Monastery, Gr. 213	Sinai	Egypt	CSNTM
ℓ 847	967	Gospels^{esk}	ΑΩ	1	Russian National Library, Gr. 282	Saint Petersburg	Russia	
ℓ 848	9th	†Gospels^{esk}	ΑΩ	153	Saint Catherine's Monastery, Gr. 214	Sinai	Egypt	CSNTM
ℓ 849	9th	†Gospels^{esk}	ΑΩ	29	Saint Catherine's Monastery, Gr. 215	Sinai	Egypt	CSNTM
ℓ 850	12th	Gospels^{e}	αω	261	Saint Catherine's Monastery, Gr. 216	Sinai	Egypt	CSNTM
ℓ 851	11th	Gospels^{esk}	αω	341	Saint Catherine's Monastery, Gr. 217	Sinai	Egypt	CSNTM
ℓ 852	12th	Gospels^{e}	αω	336	Saint Catherine's Monastery, Gr. 218	Sinai	Egypt	CSNTM
ℓ 853	11th	Gospels^{e}	αω	270	Saint Catherine's Monastery, Gr. 219	Sinai	Egypt	CSNTM
ℓ 854	1167	Gospels^{e}	αω	355	Saint Catherine's Monastery, Gr. 220	Sinai	Egypt	CSNTM
ℓ 855	1175	Gospels^{e}	αω	284	Saint Catherine's Monastery, Gr. 221	Sinai	Egypt	CSNTM
ℓ 856	12th	Gospels^{esk}	αω	421	Saint Catherine's Monastery, Gr. 222	Sinai	Egypt	CSNTM
ℓ 857	11th	Gospels^{esk}	αω	206	Saint Catherine's Monastery, Gr. 223	Sinai	Egypt	
ℓ 857	11th	Gospels^{esk}	αω	1	Russian National Library, Gr. 289	Saint Petersburg	Russia	
ℓ 858	12th	†Gospels^{esk}	αω	169	Saint Catherine's Monastery, Gr. 224	Sinai	Egypt	CSNTM
ℓ 859	11th	†Gospels^{esk}	αω	156	Saint Catherine's Monastery, Gr. 225	Sinai	Egypt	CSNTM
ℓ 860	12th	†Gospels^{esk}	αω	224	Saint Catherine's Monastery, Gr. 226	Sinai	Egypt	CSNTM
ℓ 861	12th	Gospels^{e}	αω	281	Saint Catherine's Monastery, Gr. 227	Sinai	Egypt	CSNTM
ℓ 862	13th	Gospels^{sk}	αω	323	Saint Catherine's Monastery, Gr. 228	Sinai	Egypt	CSNTM
ℓ 863	11th	†Gospels^{esk}	αω	242	Saint Catherine's Monastery, Gr. 229	Sinai	Egypt	CSNTM
ℓ 864	11th	Gospels^{esk}	αω	273	Saint Catherine's Monastery, Gr. 230	Sinai	Egypt	CSNTM
ℓ 865	11th	Gospels^{esk}	αω	151	Saint Catherine's Monastery, Gr. 231	Sinai	Egypt	CSNTM
ℓ 865	11th	Gospels^{esk}	αω	1	Russian National Library, Gr. 288	Saint Petersburg	Russia	
ℓ 866	1174	Gospels^{esk}	αω	143	Saint Catherine's Monastery, Gr. 232	Sinai	Egypt	CSNTM
ℓ 867	12th	Gospels^{e}	αω	273	Saint Catherine's Monastery, Gr. 233	Sinai	Egypt	CSNTM
[ℓ 868]=ℓ 1405								
ℓ 869	12th	Gospels^{esk}	αω	240	Saint Catherine's Monastery, Gr. 235	Sinai	Egypt	CSNTM
ℓ 870	11th	Gospels^{esk}	αω	236	Saint Catherine's Monastery, Gr. 236	Sinai	Egypt	CSNTM
ℓ 871	12th	Gospels^{esk}	αω	208	Saint Catherine's Monastery, Gr. 237	Sinai	Egypt	CSNTM
ℓ 872	14th	Apostles^{e}	αω	194	Church of Protaton, 54	Mount Athos	Greece	
ℓ 873	1554	Apostles^{esk}	αω	162	Stavronikita Monastery, 129	Mount Athos	Greece	
ℓ 874	16th	Gospels^{e}	αω	365	Saint Catherine's Monastery, Gr. 240	Sinai	Egypt	CSNTM
ℓ 875	11th	†Gospels^{esk}	αω	230	Saint Catherine's Monastery, Gr. 241	Sinai	Egypt	CSNTM
ℓ 876	12th	†Gospels^{e}	αω	182	Saint Catherine's Monastery, Gr. 242	Sinai	Egypt	CSNTM
ℓ 877	11th	†Gospels^{(esk)}	αω	118	Saint Catherine's Monastery, Gr. 243	Sinai	Egypt	CSNTM
ℓ 878	12th	†Gospels^{esk}	αω	2	Saint Catherine's Monastery, Gr. 244; Gr. 245	Sinai	Egypt	CSNTM
[ℓ 879]								
ℓ 880	13th	Gospels^{P}	αω	56	Saint Catherine's Monastery, Gr. 246	Sinai	Egypt	CSNTM
ℓ 881	14th	Apostles^{e}	αω	216	Philotheou Monastery, 17	Mount Athos	Greece	
ℓ 882	13th	Apostles	αω	?	National Archives of Albania	Tirana	Albania	
ℓ 883	11th	Apostles^{e}	αω	233	Ecumenical Patriarchate, Triados 13 (11)	Istanbul	Turkey	CSNTM
ℓ 884	13th	†Apostles^{e}	αω	206	Ecumenical Patriarchate, Chalki, Triados, 14	Istanbul	Turkey	INTF
ℓ 885	15th	Gospels^{esk}	αω	226	Saint Catherine's Monastery, Gr. 251	Sinai	Egypt	CSNTM
ℓ 886	16th	Gospels^{e}	αω	408	Saint Catherine's Monastery, Gr. 252	Sinai	Egypt	CSNTM
ℓ 887	14th	Gospels^{esk}	αω	300	Saint Catherine's Monastery, Gr. 253	Sinai	Egypt	CSNTM
ℓ 888	14th	Gospels^{e}	αω	331	Saint Catherine's Monastery, Gr. 254	Sinai	Egypt	CSNTM
ℓ 889	14th	Gospels^{esk}	αω	401	Saint Catherine's Monastery, Gr. 255	Sinai	Egypt	CSNTM
ℓ 890	1420	Gospels^{sk}	αω	277	Saint Catherine's Monastery, Gr. 256	Sinai	Egypt	CSNTM
ℓ 891	1102	†Gospels^{esk}	αω	212	Saint Catherine's Monastery, Gr. 257	Sinai	Egypt	CSNTM
ℓ 892	15th	Gospels + Apostles^{sk}	αω	224	Saint Catherine's Monastery, Gr. 258	Sinai	Egypt	CSNTM
ℓ 893	15th	Gospels + Apostles^{esk}	αω	404	Saint Catherine's Monastery, Gr. 271	Sinai	Egypt	CSNTM
ℓ 894	15th	†Gospels + Apostles^{esk}	αω	146	Saint Catherine's Monastery, Gr. 272	Sinai	Egypt	CSNTM
ℓ 895	13th	Apostles^{esk}	αω	134	Ecumenical Patriarchate, Chalki, Triados, 15	Istanbul	Turkey	INTF
ℓ 896	13th	Gospels^{Lit}	αω	489	Saint Catherine's Monastery, Gr. 550	Sinai	Egypt	CSNTM
ℓ 897	1522	Gospels^{Lit}	αω	397	Saint Catherine's Monastery, Gr. 659	Sinai	Egypt	CSNTM
ℓ 898	17th	Gospels + Apostles^{Lit}	αω	38	Saint Catherine's Monastery, Gr. 720	Sinai	Egypt	
ℓ 899	14th	Gospels + Apostles^{Lit}	αω	330	Saint Catherine's Monastery, Gr. 738	Sinai	Egypt	
ℓ 900	15th	†Gospels + Apostles^{Lit}	αω	160	Saint Catherine's Monastery, Gr. 748	Sinai	Egypt	

[top]

=== Lectionaries 901–1000 ===
#	Date	Contents	Script	Pages	Institution	City, State	Country	Images
ℓ 901	12th	Gospels + Apostles^{Lit}	αω	322	Saint Catherine's Monastery, Gr. 754	Sinai	Egypt	CSNTM
ℓ 901	12th	Gospels + Apostles^{Lit}	αω	1	Russian National Library, Gr. 405	Saint Petersburg	Russia	
ℓ 902	13th	Gospels + Apostles^{Lit}	αω	307	Saint Catherine's Monastery, Gr. 756	Sinai	Egypt	CSNTM
ℓ 903	13th	Gospels + Apostles^{Lit}	αω	166	Saint Catherine's Monastery, Gr. 775	Sinai	Egypt	CSNTM
ℓ 904	13th	†Gospels + Apostles^{Lit}	αω	268	Saint Catherine's Monastery, Gr. 796	Sinai	Egypt	CSNTM
ℓ 905	14th	Gospels + Apostles^{Lit}	αω	107	Saint Catherine's Monastery, Gr. 1042	Sinai	Egypt	
ℓ 906	14th	Gospels + Apostles^{Lit}	αω	254	Saint Catherine's Monastery, Gr. 800	Sinai	Egypt	
ℓ 907	9th	Gospels^{esk}	ΑΩ P^{U}	82	Saint Catherine's Monastery, Gr. 929	Sinai	Egypt	CSNTM
ℓ 907	9th	Gospels^{esk}	ΑΩ P^{U}	1	Russian National Library, Gr. 372	Saint Petersburg	Russia	
ℓ 908	1697	Gospels^{Lit}	αω	80	Saint Catherine's Monastery, Gr. 943	Sinai	Egypt	
ℓ 909	10th	Gospels + Apostles^{Lit}	αω	86	Saint Catherine's Monastery, Gr. 957	Sinai	Egypt	CSNTM
ℓ 909	10th	Gospels + Apostles^{Lit}	αω	82	Russian National Library, Gr. 418	Saint Petersburg	Russia	
ℓ 910	13th	Gospels + Apostles^{Lit}	αω P^{O}	155	Saint Catherine's Monastery, Gr. 960	Sinai	Egypt	CSNTM
ℓ 911	12th	Gospels + Apostles^{Lit}	αω	100	Saint Catherine's Monastery, Gr. 961	Sinai	Egypt	CSNTM
ℓ 912	12th	Gospels + Apostles^{Lit}	αω	202	Saint Catherine's Monastery, Gr. 962	Sinai	Egypt	CSNTM
ℓ 913	14th	Gospels + Apostles^{Lit}	αω	53	Saint Catherine's Monastery, Gr. 965	Sinai	Egypt	
ℓ 914	1426	Gospels + Apostles^{Lit}	αω	489	Saint Catherine's Monastery, Gr. 968	Sinai	Egypt	CSNTM
ℓ 914	1426	Gospels + Apostles^{Lit}	αω	1	Russian National Library, Gr. 323	Saint Petersburg	Russia	
ℓ 915	15th	Gospels + Apostles^{Lit}	αω	430	Saint Catherine's Monastery, Gr. 972	Sinai	Egypt	
ℓ 916	12th	Gospels + Apostles^{Lit}	αω	168	Saint Catherine's Monastery, Gr. 973	Sinai	Egypt	CSNTM
ℓ 916	12th	Gospels + Apostles^{Lit}	αω	1	Russian National Library, Gr. 418	Saint Petersburg	Russia	
ℓ 917	15th	Gospels + Apostles^{Lit}	αω	495	Saint Catherine's Monastery, Gr. 977	Sinai	Egypt	
ℓ 918	14th	Gospels + Apostles^{Lit}	αω	294	Saint Catherine's Monastery, Gr. 981	Sinai	Egypt	
ℓ 919	14th	Gospels + Apostles^{Lit}	αω	211	Saint Catherine's Monastery, Gr. 982	Sinai	Egypt	
ℓ 920	15th	Gospels + Apostles^{Lit}	αω	140	Saint Catherine's Monastery, Gr. 986	Sinai	Egypt	
ℓ 921	12th	Apostles^{e}	αω	234	Ecumenical Patriarchate, Chalki, Kamariotissis, 59	Istanbul	Turkey	CSNTM
ℓ 922	11th	Gospels^{P}	αω	1	Bodleian Library, E. D. Clarke 9, fol. III. 182 (fol. 1-181: 383)	Oxford	United Kingdom	
ℓ 923		Gospels + Apostles^{P}	αω		Owner Unknown			
ℓ 924	12th	Gospels + Apostles^{Lit}	αω	166	Vatican Library, Reg. gr. 54	Vatican City	Vatican City	
ℓ 925	17th	Gospels^{Lit}	αω	65	Marciana National Library, Gr. II,188 (1402)	Venice	Italy	
ℓ 926	12th	Gospels^{P}	αω P^{U}	26	British Library, Add MS 10068	London	United Kingdom	BL
ℓ 927	14th	Gospels + Apostles^{Lit}	αω	270	British Library, Add MS 24378	London	United Kingdom	BL
ℓ 928	13th	John 5:24-45	αω	1	National Library, Supplement Grec 179.180, fol. 79	Paris	France	INTF
ℓ 929	12th	Gospels + Apostles^{Lit}	αω	26	Union Theological Seminary The Burke Library, UTS MS 041	New York, NY	United States	UC
ℓ 930	13th	†Gospels^{e}	αω	230	British Library, Add MS 19459	London	United Kingdom	BL
ℓ 931	15th	Gospels + Apostles^{k}	αω	75	Marciana National Library, Gr. II,130 (1173)	Venice	Italy	
ℓ 932	13th	Gospels^{PsO}	αω	117	British Library, Add MS 40656	London	United Kingdom	BL
ℓ 933	13th	Gospels^{k-K}	αω	142	Vallicelliana Library, C. 7	Rome	Italy	
ℓ 934	966	Gospels^{PsO-K}	αω	222	Russian National Library, Gr. 64	Saint Petersburg	Russia	
ℓ 935	12th	Gospels + Apostles^{Lit}	αω	478	National Library, Grec 13	Paris	France	
ℓ 936	13th	Gospels + Apostles^{Lit}	αω	200	National Library, Grec 263	Paris	France	BnF
ℓ 937	13th	Gospels + Apostles^{Lit}	αω	70	Owner Unknown			
ℓ 938	13th	Apostles^{e}	αω	239	Ecumenical Patriarchate, Kamariotissis 74 (71)	Istanbul	Turkey	CSNTM
ℓ 939	12th	Gospels^{esk}	αω	238	British Library, Add MS 34059	London	United Kingdom	BL
ℓ 940	13th	Gospels^{Lit}	αω	147	British Library, Egerton MS 2743	London	United Kingdom	BL
ℓ 941	12th	†Gospels^{esk}	αω	165	British Library, Egerton MS 2745	London	United Kingdom	BL
ℓ 942	12th	Gospels^{sel}	αω	210	Topkapi Palace Museum, 21	Istanbul	Turkey	INTF
ℓ 943	14th	Gospels^{esk}	αω	295	Russian National Library, Gr. 185	Saint Petersburg	Russia	
ℓ 944	10th	Gospels^{esk}	αω	198	National and University Library, Ms. 1.895	Strasbourg	France	INTF
ℓ 945	15th/16th	Gospels + Apostles^{Lit}	αω	390	Jagiellonian Library, Graec. qu. 17	Kraków	Poland	
ℓ 946	10th	Gospels^{P}	αω	2	Berlin State Library, Graec. fol. 29	Berlin	Germany	
ℓ 946	10th	Gospels^{P}	αω	3	Saint Catherine's Monastery, N. E. Σπ. ΜΓ 26	Sinai	Egypt	
ℓ 947	12th	Gospels^{esk}	αω	284	Gesamthochschul Library, 2° Ms. theol. 61	Kassel	Germany	
ℓ 948	12th	Gospels^{P}	αω	12	University Library, Cod. Gr. 18 8	Leipzig	Germany	
ℓ 949	13th	†Gospels^{esk}	αω	159	University Library, Gr. 68	Uppsala	Sweden	UU
ℓ 950	13th	Gospels^{e}	αω	210	University Library, Gr. 69	Uppsala	Sweden	UU
ℓ 951	12th	Gospels^{e}	αω	247	Drew University Rose Memorial Library, Ms. 6	Madison, NJ	United States	CSNTM
ℓ 952	12th	†Gospels^{esk}	αω	175	Drew University Rose Memorial Library, Ms. 7	Madison, NJ	United States	CSNTM
ℓ 953	16th	Gospels^{P}	αω	13	Drew University Rose Memorial Library, Ms. 8	Madison, NJ	United States	CSNTM
ℓ 954=[ℓ 2361]	14th	Gospels^{esk}	αω	334	Owner Unknown			INTF
ℓ 955	13th	Gospels^{esk}	αω	238	Brown University, John Hay Library, Ms. Greek 1	Providence, RI	United States	
ℓ 956	15th	Gospels^{e}	αω	180	The New York Public Library, Rare Books and Manuscripts Division, MA 102	New York, NY	United States	CSNTM
ℓ 957	16th	Gospels^{P}	αω	10	National Library, Supplement Grec 1105	Paris	France	BnF
ℓ 958	13th	Gospels^{e}	αω	232	National Library, Supplement Grec 1267	Paris	France	BnF
ℓ 959	15th	Gospels + Apostles^{Lit}	αω	379	National Library, Supplement Grec 1272	Paris	France	BnF
ℓ 960	15th	Gospels + Apostles^{Lit}	αω	410	Municipal Library, Ms. 1204, Ms. 1204	Troyes	France	
ℓ 961	12th	Gospels^{P}	ΑΩ	7	National Library, Copt. 129,7, fol. 51, 56; 8, fol. 136; 9, fol. 74; 10, fol. 193; fol. 83, 84	Paris	France	
ℓ 962	11th	Gospels^{P}	ΑΩ	3	Vatican Library, Borg. copt. 109	Vatican City	Vatican City	
ℓ 962	11th	Gospels^{P}	ΑΩ	1	Musée du Louvre, E. 10039b	Paris	France	
ℓ 962	11th	Gospels^{P}	ΑΩ	2	National Library, Copt. 129,19, fol. 35f.	Paris	France	
ℓ 963+[ℓ 1614], [0100]	9th	Gospels^{P}	ΑΩ	4	University of Michigan Library, Ms. 124	Ann Arbor, MI	United States	CSNTM
ℓ 963+[ℓ 1614], [0100]	9th	Gospels^{P}	ΑΩ	1	Bodleian Library, Copt. f. 160 (P)	Oxford	United Kingdom	
ℓ 963+[ℓ 1614], [0100]	9th	Gospels^{P}	ΑΩ	5	National Library, Copt. 129,10, fol. 196; 19, fol. 57; Copt. 133,1, fol. 89, 98, 98b	Paris	France	
ℓ 964	13th	Gospels^{P}	ΑΩ	1	National Library, Copt. 129,19, fol. 65	Paris	France	
ℓ 965 + [0114]	9th	Gospels^{P}	ΑΩ	7	National Library, Copt. 129,10; 21, fol. 1-4, 10; Copt. 133,1, fol. 50	Paris	France	
ℓ 965 + [0114]	9th	Gospels^{P}	ΑΩ	1	Austrian National Library, Pap. K. 9673a	Vienna	Austria	
ℓ 966	12th	Gospels^{esk}	αω	376	Marciana National Library, Gr. I,64 (437)	Venice	Italy	
ℓ 967	10th	Gospels	αω		Owner Unknown			
ℓ 968	12th		αω	24	National Library, Suppl. Gr. 185, fol. 154-177 (fol. 1-39.68-153: 120)	Paris	France	
ℓ 968	12th		αω	6	University Library, B. P. Gr. 96	Leiden	Netherlands	
ℓ 969			αω		Panagia Hozoviotissa Monastery	Amorgos	Greece	
ℓ 970			αω		Panagia Hozoviotissa Monastery	Amorgos	Greece	
ℓ 971	1043	†Gospels^{esk}	αω	232	Russian State Library, F.270.1a.6 (Gr. 16)	Moscow	Russia	CSNTM
ℓ 972	11th	†Gospels^{esk}	αω	208	Russian State Library, F.270 07 (gr. 17)	Moscow	Russia	
ℓ 973	12th	Gospels^{esk}	αω	271	Russian State Library, F.270 09 (gr. 18)	Moscow	Russia	
ℓ 974	13th	Gospels^{P}	αω	60	Russian State Library, F.270 11 (gr. 20)	Moscow	Russia	
ℓ 975	13th	†Gospels^{e}	αω	204	Russian State Library, F.270 12 (gr. 19)	Moscow	Russia	
ℓ 976	1320	†Gospels^{e}	αω	226	Russian State Library, F.270 13 (gr. 21)	Moscow	Russia	
ℓ 977	14th	†Gospels + Apostles^{k}	αω	133	Russian State Library, F.270 14 (gr. 22)	Moscow	Russia	
ℓ 978	13th	†Gospels + Apostles	αω	140	Zoodochos Pigi Monastery (Hagias), 22	Andros	Greece	
ℓ 979	12th	Gospels^{e}	αω	408	Zoodochos Pigi Monastery (Hagias), 85	Andros	Greece	
ℓ 980	11th	Gospels^{e}	αω	283	Zoodochos Pigi Monastery (Hagias), 86	Andros	Greece	
ℓ 981	13th	†Gospels^{esk}	αω	193	Zoodochos Pigi Monastery (Hagias), 87	Andros	Greece	
ℓ 982	14th	†Gospels	αω	321	Zoodochos Pigi Monastery (Hagias), 90	Andros	Greece	
ℓ 983	13th	†Gospels^{esk}	αω	150	Zoodochos Pigi Monastery (Hagias), 92	Andros	Greece	
ℓ 984	12th	Gospels^{esk}	αω	248	Zoodochos Pigi Monastery (Hagias), 95	Andros	Greece	
ℓ 985	12th	†Gospels^{e}	αω	322	Zoodochos Pigi Monastery (Hagias), 97	Andros	Greece	
ℓ 986	13th	Gospels^{e}	αω	195	Zoodochos Pigi Monastery (Hagias), 103	Andros	Greece	
ℓ 987	12th	Gospels^{e}	αω	304	Augusteum und Lutherhaus, S. 143/2878	Wittenberg	Germany	
ℓ 988	12th	Gospels^{sk}	αω	187	Monastery of St. John the Theologian, 11	Antissa, Lesbos	Greece	
ℓ 989	12th	Gospels^{esk}	αω	110	Monastery of St. John the Theologian, 12	Antissa, Lesbos	Greece	
ℓ 990	1565	Gospels^{e}	αω	375	Plomari Club Benjamin, MS 498	Lesbos	Greece	CSNTM
ℓ 991	10th/11th	Gospels^{e}	αω	335	Patriarchate of Jerusalem, Taphu 33	Jerusalem	Israel	CSNTM
ℓ 992	1762	Gospels^{e}	αω	115	Patriarchate of Jerusalem, Taphu 105	Jerusalem	Israel	CSNTM
ℓ 993	17th	Gospels^{P}	αω	49	Patriarchate of Jerusalem, Taphu 161	Jerusalem	Israel	CSNTM
ℓ 994	1502	Gospels^{esk}	αω	108	Patriarchate of Jerusalem, Taphu 526	Jerusalem	Israel	CSNTM
ℓ 995	11th	Gospels^{e}	αω	294	Patriarchate of Jerusalem, Saba 12	Jerusalem	Israel	CSNTM
ℓ 995	11th	Gospels^{e}	αω	2	Russian National Library, Gr. 304	Saint Petersburg	Russia	
ℓ 996	11th	Gospels^{esk}	αω	207	Patriarchate of Jerusalem, Saba 23	Jerusalem	Israel	CSNTM
ℓ 997	12th	Gospels^{e}	αω	225	Patriarchate of Jerusalem, Saba 40	Jerusalem	Israel	CSNTM
ℓ 998	14th	†Gospels^{esk}	αω	318	Patriarchate of Jerusalem, Saba 58	Jerusalem	Israel	CSNTM
[ℓ 999] = ℓ 1408								
ℓ 1000	11th	†Gospels^{esk}	αω	163	Patriarchate of Jerusalem, Saba 82	Jerusalem	Israel	CSNTM

[top]

== See also ==
Lists

- Categories of New Testament manuscripts
- List of New Testament papyri
- List of New Testament uncials
- List of New Testament minuscules
- List of New Testament Latin manuscripts

Articles

- Novum Testamentum Graece
- Biblical manuscript
- Palaeography
- Textual criticism

== Bibliography ==
- Dr. Peter M. Head. The Early Greek Bible Manuscript Project: New Testament Lectionary Manuscripts.
- K. Aland, M. Welte, B. Köster, K. Junack, Kurzgefasste Liste der griechischen Handschriften des Neuen Testaments, Walter de Gruyter, Berlin, New York 1994, pp. 219 ff.
- Aland, Kurt; Barbara Aland (1995). The Text of the New Testament: An Introduction to the Critical Editions and to the Theory and Practice of Modern Textual Criticism. Translated by Erroll F. Rhodes (2nd ed.). Grand Rapids, Michigan: William B. Eerdmans Publishing Co. ISBN 0-8028-4098-1.
- Seid, Timothy. "A Table of Greek Manuscripts". Interpreting Ancient Manuscripts. Retrieved June 22, 2007.
- Black M., Aland K., Die alten Übersetzungen des Neuen Testaments, die Kirchenväterzitate und Lektionare: der gegenwärtige Stand ihrer Erforschung und ihre Bedeutung für die griechische Textgeschichte, Wissenschaftliche Beirat des Instituts für neutestamentliche Textforschung, Berlin 1972.
- Carroll D. Osburn, The Greek Lectionaries of the New Testament, in. The Text of the New Testament in Contemporary Research, ed. Bart D. Ehrman and Michael W. Holmes, William B. Eerdmans Publishing Company, Grand Rapids 1995, pp. 61–74.
