= List of New Testament minuscules (1901–2000) =

A New Testament minuscule is a copy of a portion of the New Testament written in a small, cursive Greek script (developed from Uncial).

== Legend ==
- The numbers (#) are the now standard system of Caspar René Gregory, often referred to as the Gregory-Aland numbers.
- Included among the cataloged minuscules are the following types of manuscripts, color coded:

Grey represents continuous text manuscripts containing only New Testament portions
Beige represents manuscripts with New Testament portions and a catena (quotations from church fathers)
Light cyan represents manuscripts of single-author commentaries who included the full Scripture text.
Light red represents manuscripts of single-author commentaries who included both the full Scripture text and a catena.
Light purple represents manuscripts of commentaries where the Scripture text was abridged.
White represents manuscript numbers no longer in use.

- Dates are estimated to the nearest 100 year increment where specific date is unknown.
- Content generally only describes sections of the New Testament: Gospels, The Acts of the Apostles (Acts), Pauline epistles, and so on. Sometimes the surviving portion of a codex is so limited that specific books, chapters or even verses can be indicated. Linked articles, where they exist, generally specify content in detail, by verse.
- Digital images are referenced with direct links to the hosting web pages, with the exception of those at the INTF. The quality and accessibility of the images is as follows:

Gold color indicates high resolution color images available online.
Tan color indicates high resolution color images available locally, not online.
Light tan color indicates only a small fraction of manuscript pages with color images available online.
Light gray color indicates black/white or microfilm images available online.
Light blue color indicates manuscript not imaged, and is currently lost or ownership unknown.
Light pink color indicates manuscript destroyed, presumed destroyed, or deemed too fragile to digitize.
Violet color indicates high resolution ultraviolet images available online.

† Indicates the manuscript has damaged or missing pages.
^{P} Indicates only a portion of the books were included.
^{K} Indicates manuscript also includes a commentary.
^{S} Indicates lost portions of manuscript replaced via supplement of a later hand.
^{abs} (abschrift) Indicates manuscript is copy.
[ ] Brackets around Gregory-Aland number indicate the manuscript belongs to an already numbered manuscript, was found to not be a continuous text manuscript, was found to be written in modern Greek versus Koine Greek, was proved a forgery, or has been destroyed.

== Minuscules 1901-2000 ==
#	Date	Contents	Pages	Institution and refs.	City, State	Country	Images
1901	1524	Gospels	296	Monastery of Saint John the Theologian, 635	Patmos	Greece	INTF
1902	14th	Acts†, Pauline Epistles†	297	Esphigmenou Monastery, 198	Mount Athos	Greece	INTF
1903	1636	Acts, Pauline Epistles, Revelation	250	Xeropotamou Monastery, 243	Mount Athos	Greece	INTF
1904	11th	Acts†, Pauline Epistles^{P}†,	35	Koutloumousiou Monastery, 86	Mount Athos	Greece	INTF
1905	10th	Pauline Epistles†	251	National Library, Coislin 27	Paris	France	INTF
1906	1056	Pauline Epistles	272	National Library, Coislin 28	Paris	France	INTF
1907	11th	Pauline epistles†	169	Cambridge University Library, Ff. 1.30	Cambridge	UK	INTF
1907	11th	Pauline epistles†	170	Magdalen College, Gr. 7	Oxford	UK	DB
1907	11th	Pauline epistles†	170	Magdalen College, Gr. 7	Oxford	UK	INTF
1908	11th	Pauline epistles	255	Bodleian Library, Roe 16	Oxford	UK	INTF
1909	12th	Romans 7:7 - 16:24 (Nicetas Catena)	359	Bavarian State Library, Cod.graec. 412	Munich	Germany	BSB, INTF
[1909^{abs}]= 2888							
1910	11th/12th	Galatians - Hebrews	312	National Library, Coislin 204	Paris	France	INTF
1911	16th	Pauline epistles	233	British Library, Harley MS 5552	London	UK	BL
1911	16th	Pauline epistles	233	British Library, Harley MS 5552	London	UK	INTF
1912	10th	Pauline Epistles (without Titus and Philemon)	170	Victor Emmanuel III National Library, Cod. Neapol. ex Vind. 8	Naples	Italy	INTF
1913	13th	Theophylact Commentary on the Pauline epistles†	85	Leipzig University Library, Cod. Gr. 16, fol. 1-85	Leipzig	Germany	INTF
1914	12th	Pauline epistles	266	Vatican Library, Vat.gr.761	Vatican City	Vatican	INTF
1915	10th	Romans, 1 Corinthians, 2 Corinthians	411	Vatican Library, Vat.gr.762	Vatican City	Vatican	INTF
1916	11th	Pauline epistles	177	Vatican Library, Vat.gr.765	Vatican City	Vatican	INTF
1917	12th	Pauline epistles	249	Vatican Library, Vat.gr.766	Vatican City	Vatican	INTF
1918	14th	Romans - 1 Timothy†, Revelation†	60	Vatican Library, Vat.gr.1136	Vatican City	Vatican	INTF
1918	14th	Romans - 1 Timothy†, Revelation†	4	Vatican Library, Vat.gr.1882	Vatican City	Vatican	DVL
1919	11th	Pauline Epistles	426	Laurentian Library, Plut.10.04	Florence	Italy	BML, INTF
1920	10th	Pauline Epistles	285	Laurentian Library, Plut.10.06	Florence	Italy	BML, INTF
1921	11th	Pauline Epistles	270	Laurentian Library, Plut.10.07	Florence	Italy	BML, INTF
1922	13th	Pauline Epistles	260	Laurentian Library, Plut.10.19	Florence	Italy	BML, INTF
1923	11th	Pauline Epistles	369	Marciana National Library, Gr. Z. 33 (423)	Venice	Italy	INTF
1924	11th	Pauline Epistles	332	Marciana National Library, Gr. Z. 34 (349)	Venice	Italy	INTF
1925	11th	2 Corinthians - Hebrews	159	Marciana National Library, Gr. Z. 35 (343)	Venice	Italy	INTF
1926	12th	Theophylact Commentary on 1 Corinthians, 2 Corinthians	462	State Historical Museum, V. 97, S. 305	Moscow	Russia	INTF
1927	10th	Pauline Epistles	241	State Historical Museum, V. 94, S. 98	Moscow	Russia	INTF
1928	15th	Theophylact Commentary on Romans†	41	State Historical Museum, V. 418, S. 363, fol. 117-157	Moscow	Russia	INTF
1929	1387	Theophylact Commentary on the Pauline Epistles†	381	Bavarian State Library, Cod.graec. 504	Munich	Germany	BSB, CSNTM, INTF
[1929^{abs}]= 2889							
1930	16th	Theophylact Commentary on the Pauline Epistles	488	Bavarian State Library, Cod.graec. 35	Munich	Germany	INTF
1931	16th	Pauline Epistles	168	National Library, Grec 126	Paris	France	INTF
1932	11th	Pauline Epistles†	227	National Library, Grec 222	Paris	France	BnF, INTF
1933	1045	Pauline Epistles	273	National Library, Grec 223	Paris	France	BnF, INTF
1934	11th	Pauline Epistles, Revelation	274	National Library, Grec 224	Paris	France	BnF, INTF
1935	16th	Theophylact Commentary on Romans - 2 Thessalonians	401	National Library, Grec 225	Paris	France	BnF, INTF
1936	16th	Chrysostom Commentary on Romans 1:1 - 6:11	96	National Library, Grec 226	Paris	France	BnF
1937	16th	1 Corinthians	213	National Library, Grec 227	Paris	France	BnF, INTF
1938	13th	Hebrews (Nicetas Catena)	391	National Library, Grec 238	Paris	France	BnF, INTF
1939	16th	Theodoret Commentary on the Pauline Epistles	261	National Library, Grec 849	Paris	France	BnF, INTF
1940	16th	1 Thessalonians - Hebrews	71	Formerly, Turin National University Library, C.VI.29 (destroyed)	Turin	Italy	
1941	13th	Pauline Epistles†	241	Ambrosiana Library, B 6 inf.	Milan	Italy	INTF
1942	12th	Chrysostom Commentary on Romans - 1 Thessalonians†	175	Ambrosiana Library, A 51 /b sup.	Milan	Italy	INTF
1943	14th	Theophylact Commentary on the Pauline Epistles	341	Ambrosiana Library, F 125 sup.	Milan	Italy	INTF
[1944] = 2288							
1945	13th	Theodoret Commentary on the Pauline Epistles	137	Vatican Library, Vat.gr.1649	Vatican City	Vatican	INTF
1946	11th	1 Corinthians - Hebrews†	181	Vatican Library, Ott.gr.31	Vatican City	Vatican	DVL
1946	11th	1 Corinthians - Hebrews†	181	Vatican Library, Ott.gr.31	Vatican City	Vatican	INTF
1947	15th	Theophylact Commentary on the Pauline Epistles†	198	Vatican Library, Ott.gr.61	Vatican City	Vatican	DVL
1947	15th	Theophylact Commentary on the Pauline Epistles†	198	Vatican Library, Ott.gr.61	Vatican City	Vatican	INTF
1948	15th	Pauline Epistles, Revelation	187	Vatican Library, Ott.gr.176	Vatican City	Vatican	DVL
1948	15th	Pauline Epistles, Revelation	187	Vatican Library, Ott.gr.176	Vatican City	Vatican	INTF
1949	15th	Romans 1:1 - 9:1	144	Vatican Library, Ott.gr.356	Vatican City	Vatican	DVL
1949	15th	Romans 1:1 - 9:1	144	Vatican Library, Ott.gr.356	Vatican City	Vatican	INTF
1950	14th	Theophylact Commentary on the Pauline Epistles†	279	Vatican Library, Chig.R.V.32	Vatican City	Vatican	INTF
1951	12th	Pauline Epistles	158	Vatican Library, Chig.R.VIII.55	Vatican City	Vatican	INTF
1952	14th	Pauline Epistles	267	Vatican Library, Barb.gr.503	Vatican City	Vatican	INTF
1953	13th	Romans 1:1 - 1 Corinthians 1:12	70	Austrian National Library, Theol. gr. 166, fol. 1-70	Vienna	Austria	INTF
1954	10th	Pauline Epistles^{P}	62	Central Library, I. E. 11	Palermo	Italy	INTF
1955	11th	Pauline Epistles, Revelation†	144	Lambeth Palace, MS1186	London	UK	INTF
1956	13th	Pauline Epistles	198	British Library, Add MS 7142	London	UK	BL
1956	13th	Pauline Epistles	198	British Library, Add MS 7142	London	UK	INTF
1957	15th	Hebrews 9:14-13:25, Revelation	9	Vatican Library, Vat.gr.1209	Vatican City	Vatican	DVL, INTF
1958	15th	Pauline Epistles	171	Biblioteca Riccardiana, 85	Florence	Italy	INTF
1959	15th	Pauline Epistles	157	Leiden University Library, B. P. Gr. 66	Leiden	Netherlands	INTF
1960	14th	Pauline Epistles	103	Drew University, MS 1	Madison, NJ	USA	CSNTM
1961	14th	Theophylact Commentary on the Pauline Epistles	418	British Library, Arundel MS 534	London	UK	BL
1961	14th	Theophylact Commentary on the Pauline Epistles	418	British Library, Arundel MS 534	London	UK	INTF
1962	11th/12th	Chrysostom Commentary on the Pauline Epistles†	227	Austrian National Library, Theol. gr. 157	Vienna	Austria	INTF
1963	16th	Theodoret Commentary on the Pauline Epistles	262	Library of Study and Conservation, Ms. 169	Besançon	France	INTF
1964	15th	Theophylact Commentary on Romans 1:11 - 5:18; 7:5 - 16:27; 1 Corinthians 1:1-23; Hebrews	262	National Library, Grec 224 A	Paris	France	INTF
1965	14th	Theophylact Commentary on Romans 16:2-13; Colossians 1:1-4; 2 Timothy 2:19-4:22; Hebrews 1:1-2	11	National Library, Supplement Grec 1001, fol. 3.3a-12	Paris	France	INTF
1966	13th	Gospels	271	Monastery of Saint John the Theologian, 87	Patmos	Greece	INTF
1967	15th	Theodoret Commentary on Romans 1:1 - 2:26	14th	Vatican Library, Ott.gr.74, fol. 267-280	Vatican City	Vatican	DVL
1968	11th	Colossians; 1 Thessalonians	2	Vatican Library, Pal.gr.423, fol. 7.8	Vatican City	Vatican	INTF
1969	13th	Chrysostom Commentary on the Pauline Epistles	357	National Library, Coislin 29	Paris	France	INTF
1970	12th	Pauline Epistles†	177	National Library, Coislin 30	Paris	France	INTF
1971	12th	Pauline Epistles	348	National Library, Coislin 95	Paris	France	INTF
1972	13th	Pauline Epistles	227	National Library, Coislin 217	Paris	France	BnF, INTF
1973	13th	Theophylact Commentary on the Pauline Epistles	319	National Library, NLG 96	Athens	Greece	CSNTM
1974	12th	Romans - 2 Thessalonians†	152	Royal Site of San Lorenzo de El Escorial, X. IV. 15	San Lorenzo de El Escorial	Spain	INTF
1975	14th	Ephesians^{K}† 5:8 - 1 Thessalonians^{K} 2:16†	19	University Library, 2378	Bologna	Italy	INTF
1976	13th	Theophylact Commentary on Philippians† - Hebrews†	143	Laurentian Library, Plut.06.08	Florence	Italy	BML, INTF
1977	14th	Theophylact Commentary on the Pauline Epistles†	602	Laurentian Library, Plut.10.09	Florence	Italy	BML, INTF
1978	15th	Theophylact Commentary on the Pauline Epistles	529	Laurentian Library, Plut.11.07	Florence	Italy	BML, INTF
1979	16th	Theophylact Commentary on the Pauline Epistles	136	Laurentian Library, Conv.Soppr.21	Florence	Italy	BML, CSNTM, INTF
1980	11th	Pauline Epistles† (Portions of NT text abridged)	316	Ambrosiana Library, A 62 inf.	Milan	Italy	INTF
1981	11th	Pauline Epistles†	190	Ambrosiana Library, C 295 inf.	Milan	Italy	INTF
1982	11th	Pauline Epistles†	323	Ambrosiana Library, D 541 inf.	Milan	Italy	INTF
1983	13th	Hebrews (Nicetas Catena)	268	Ambrosiana Library, E 2 inf.	Milan	Italy	INTF
[1983^{abs}] = 2890							
1984	14th	Theophylact Commentary on the Pauline Epistles	436	Victor Emmanuel III National Library, Ms. II. B. 23	Naples	Italy	INTF
1985	16th	Theophylact Commentary on the Pauline Epistles	562	Victor Emmanuel III National Library, Ms. II. B. 24, fol. 354-925	Naples	Italy	INTF
1986	12th	Pauline Epistles†	189	Vatican Library, Barb.gr.574	Vatican City	Vatican	INTF
1987	14th	Theophylact Commentary on the Pauline Epistles†	531	Casanata Library, 1298	Rome	Italy	INTF
1988	12th	Theophylact Commentary on Romans-Ephesians†	380	Vatican Library, Vat.gr.549	Vatican City	Vatican	INTF
[1989]							
[1990]							
1991	13th	Theophylact Commentary on the Pauline Epistles	204	Vatican Library, Vat.gr.646	Vatican City	Vatican	INTF
1992	1232	Theophylact Commentary on the Pauline Epistles	338	Vatican Library, Vat.gr.648	Vatican City	Vatican	INTF
1993	11th	1 Corinthians-Ephesians†	93	Vatican Library, Vat.gr.692	Vatican City	Vatican	INTF
1994	16th	Theophylact Commentary on Romans, 1 Corinthians, 2 Corinthians, Ephesians, 1 Timothy, 2 Timothy, Hebrews	437	Vatican Library, Vat.gr.1222	Vatican City	Vatican	INTF
1995	15th	Theophylact Commentary on the Pauline Epistles†	294	Vatican Library, Vat.gr.2180	Vatican City	Vatican	INTF
1996	15th	Theodoret Commentary on the Pauline Epistles	294	Vatican Library, Ott.gr.17	Vatican City	Vatican	INTF
1997	10th	Pauline Epistles†	268	Vatican Library, Pal.gr.10	Vatican City	Vatican	HU
1997	10th	Pauline Epistles†	268	Vatican Library, Pal.gr.10	Vatican City	Vatican	INTF
1998	10th	Pauline Epistles	181	Vatican Library, Vat.gr.204	Vatican City	Vatican	DVL
1998	10th	Pauline Epistles	181	Vatican Library, Vat.gr.204	Vatican City	Vatican	INTF
1999	14th	Theodoret Commentary on the Pauline Epistles	196	Marciana National Library, Gr. Z. 36 (350)	Venice	Italy	INTF
2000	14th	Theophylact Commentary on the Pauline Epistles	360	Koutloumousiou Monastery, 129s	Mount Athos	Greece	INTF

[top]

== See also ==
- List of New Testament papyri
- List of New Testament uncials
- List of New Testament minuscules (1–1000)
- List of New Testament minuscules (1001–2000)
- List of New Testament minuscules (2001–)
- List of New Testament minuscules ordered by Location/Institution
- List of New Testament lectionaries

== Bibliography ==
- Aland, Kurt; M. Welte; B. Köster; K. Junack (1994). Kurzgefasste Liste der griechischen Handschriften des Neues Testaments. Berlin, New York: Walter de Gruyter. p. 95. ISBN 3-11-011986-2.
- "Liste Handschriften". Münster: Institute for New Testament Textual Research.
