= Alexios of Xenophontos =

Greek Orthodox monastic leader

Archimandrite Alexios of Xenophontos
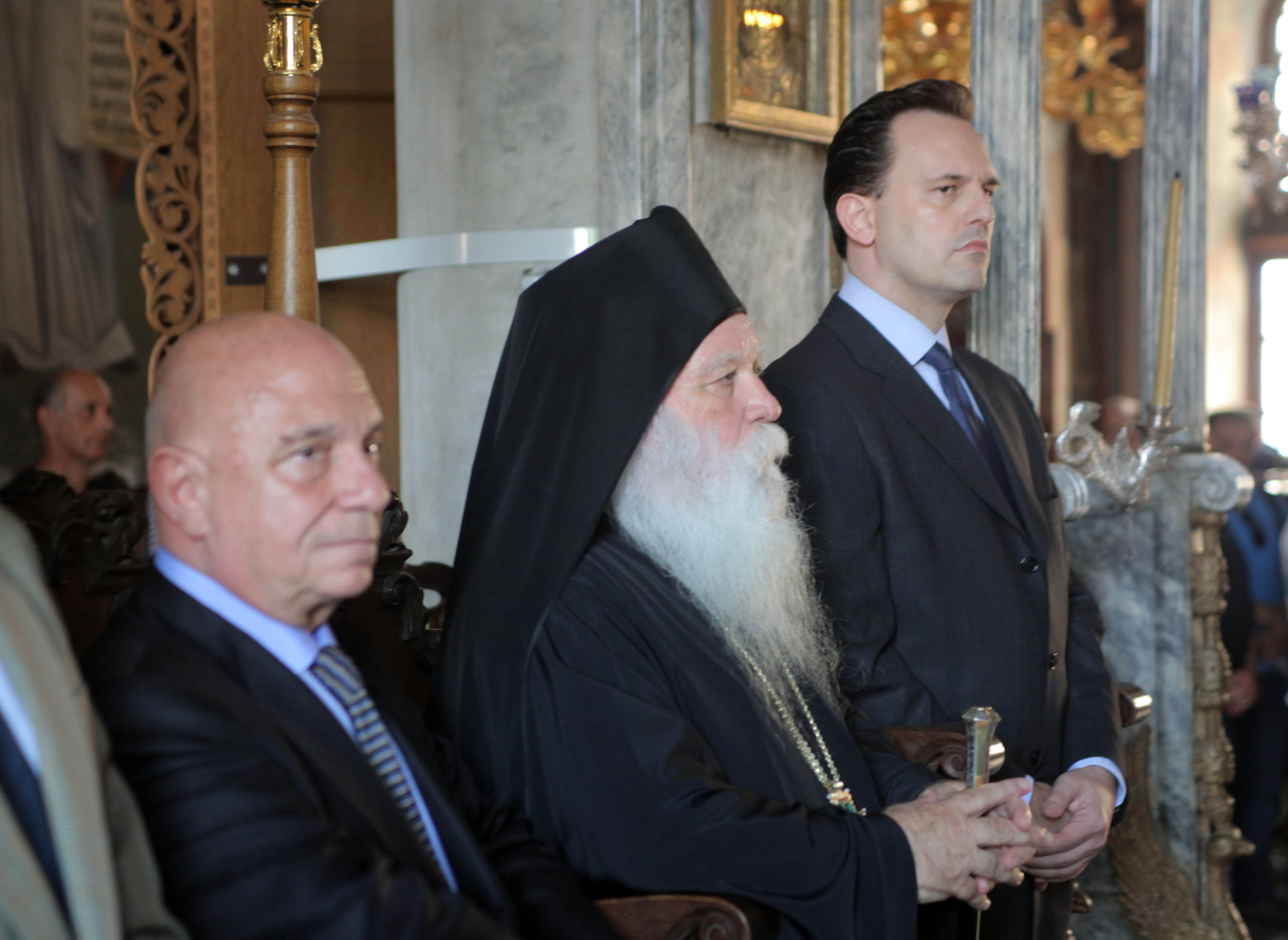
- Archimandrite Alexios of Xenophontos (center) hosting Greek Foreign Minister Dimitrios Droutsas (right) in 2011
- Native name: Απόστολος Μαντζίρης
- Church: Greek Orthodox Church

Personal details
- Born: Apostolos Mantziris (Απόστολος Μαντζίρης) c. 1939 Greece
- Denomination: Eastern Orthodox Christianity
- Residence: Xenophontos Monastery, Mount Athos
- Occupation: Abbot and monk

Archimandrite Alexios of Xenophontos (Greek: Αλέξιος Ξενοφωντινός; born Apostolos Mantziris, Greek: Απόστολος Μαντζίρης) is a Greek Orthodox archimandrite and Abbot of Xenophontos Monastery at Mount Athos.

== Biography ==
Since 1976, he has served as the hegumen (abbot) of Xenophontos Monastery at Mount Athos.

In the 1970s, Alexios was a disciple of Elder Dionysios, the Metropolitan of Trikkis, and was also the spiritual brother of Emilianos (Vafidis) of Simonopetra, as both of them were disciples of Elder Dionysios of Trikkis. In 1976, Alexios came to Xenophontos with 17 of his monks from the Monastery of Great Meteoron, of which he had been the abbot from 1973 to 1976. He continues to lead the monastery as of 2025.

In 2019, he took part in the enthronement of the head of the Orthodox Church of Ukraine, Metropolitan Epiphanius of Kyiv.
