= Philotheou Monastery =

Eastern Orthodox monastery, Mount Athos

Philotheou
- Φιλοθέου
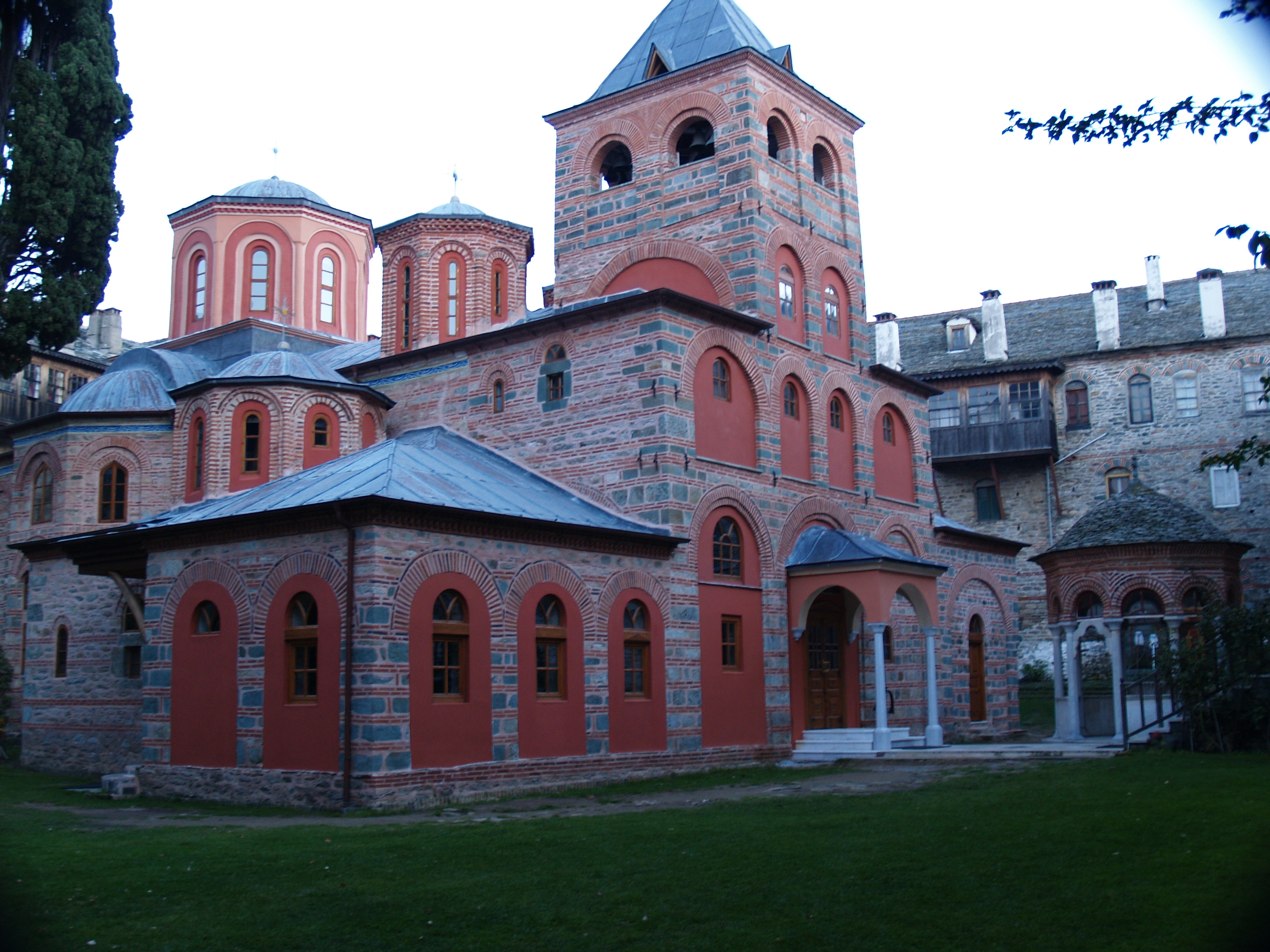
- The monastery

- Location within Mount Athos
- Interactive map of Philotheou

Monastery information
- Full name: Holy Monastery of Philotheou
- Established: end of 10th century
- Dedication: Annunciation of the Blessed Virgin
- Diocese: Mount Athos

People
- Founder: Blessed Philotheus
- Prior: Archimandrite Elder Nicodemus
- Important associated figures: St Theodosius, Metropolitan of Trebizond; Abbot Dionysios (Blessed Dionysios of Olympus); Cosmas of Aetolia; Elder Ephraim of Philotheou (Arizona) (b. 1928)

Site
- Location: Mount Athos, Greece
- Coordinates: 40°13′32.00″N 24°17′27.00″E
- Visible remains: right hand of St John Chrysostom; piece of the True Cross
- Public access: Men only
- Other information: Icons: Our Lady Glykophilousa; Lady Gerontissa

Philotheou or Filotheou Monastery (Greek: Μονή Φιλοθέου) is an Eastern Orthodox monastery at the monastic state of Mount Athos in Greece. It stands on the north-eastern side of the peninsula.

== History ==
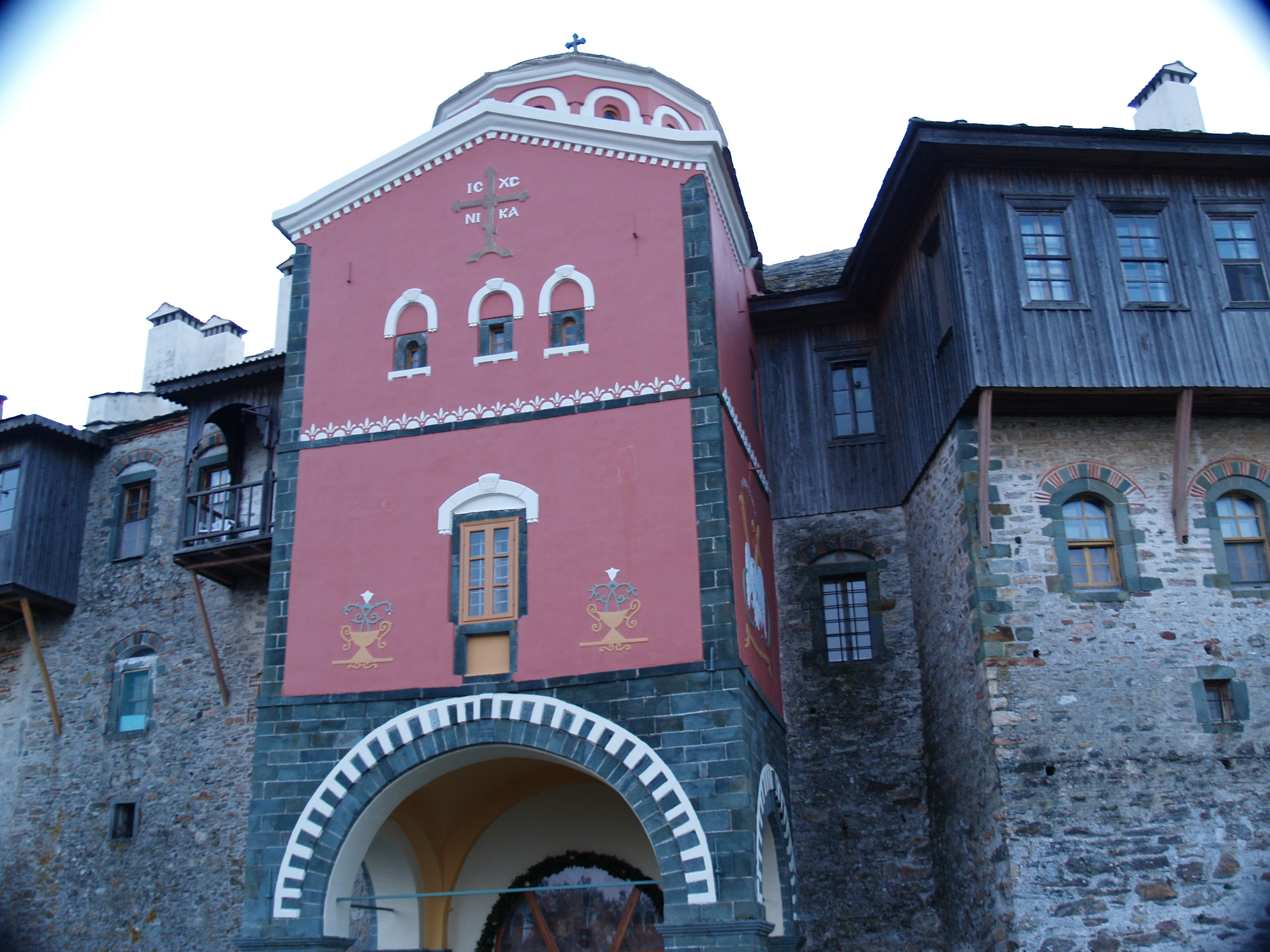
Entrance

It was founded by the Blessed Philotheus, in the end of the 10th century. The monastery ranks twelfth in the hierarchy of the Athonite monasteries.

By the end of the 15th century, according to the Russian pilgrim Isaiah, the monastery was Albanian.

In 1539–1540 the monastery was renovated with funds from the Georgian kings, Levan of Kakheti and his son Alexander II of Kakheti, frescos of whom are depicted in the refectory.

The library holds 250 manuscripts, and 2500 printed books (of which 500 are in Russian and Romanian).

The monastery contains 60 working monks.

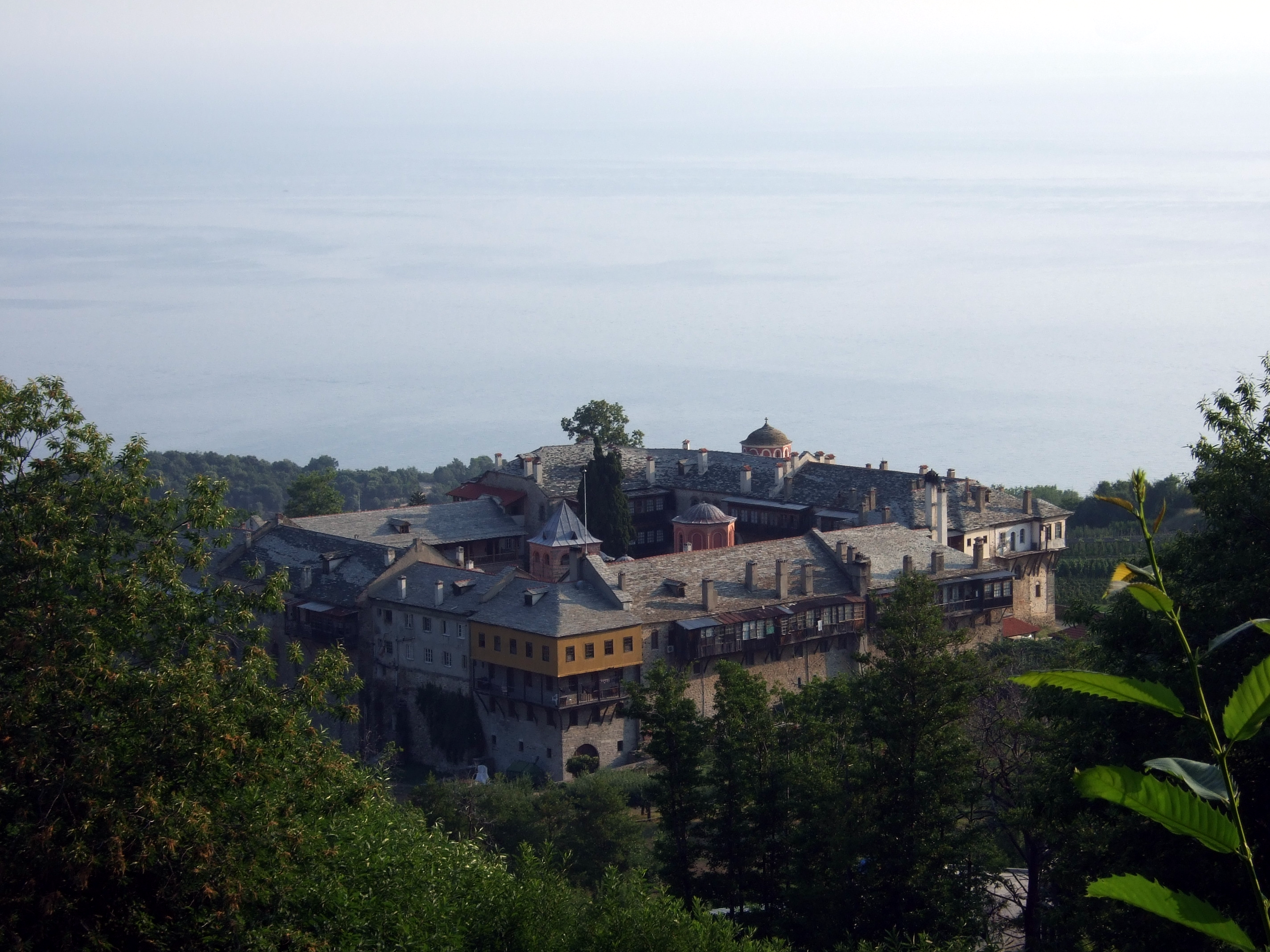
The monastery Philotheou
