= Xenophontos Monastery =

Eastern Orthodox monastery, Mount Athos

- Ξενοφώντος
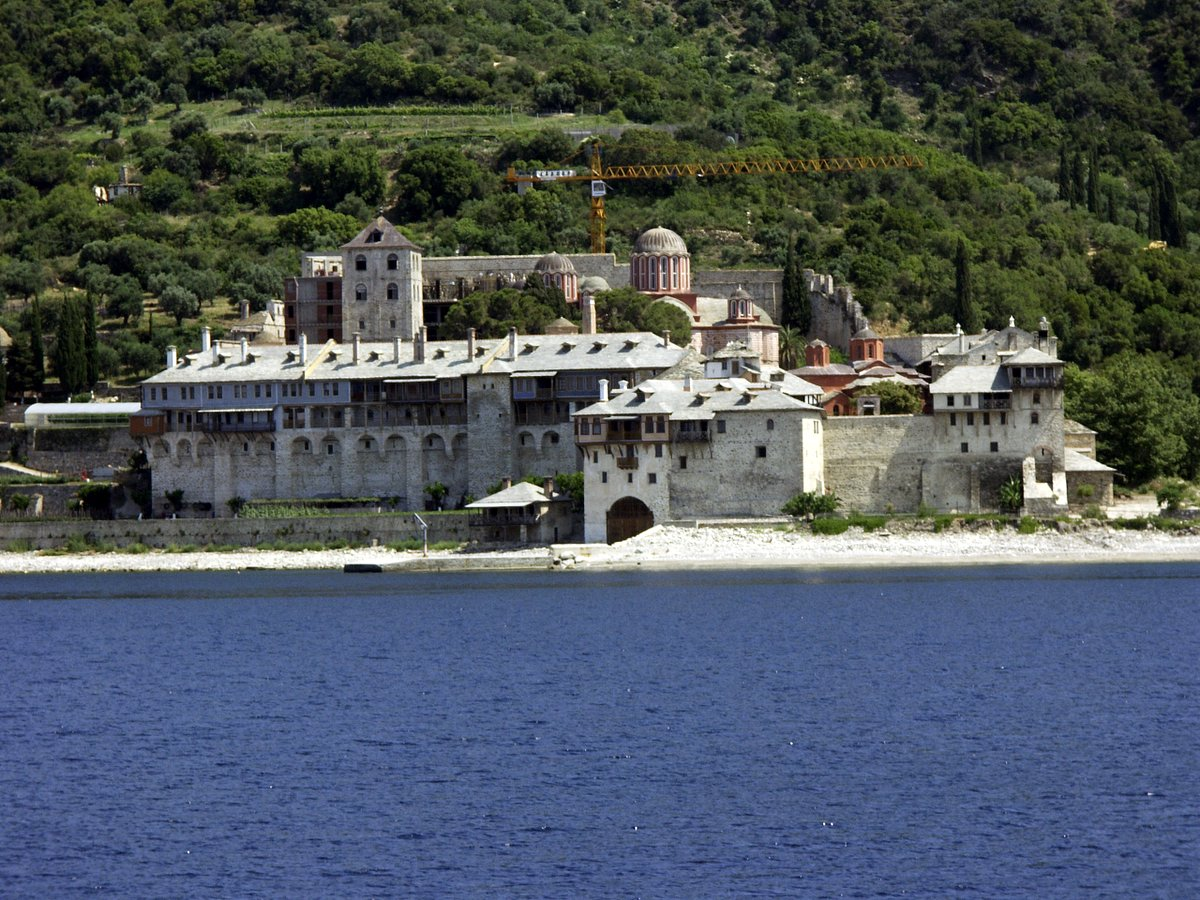
- External view of the monastery

- Location within Mount Athos

Monastery information
- Full name: Holy Monastery of Xenophontos
- Established: 10th–11th century
- Dedication: St. George
- Diocese: Mount Athosm

People
- Founder: Saint Xenophon
- Prior: Archimadrite Alexios of Xenophontos

Site
- Location: Mount Athos, Greece
- Coordinates: 40°14′45″N 24°11′25″E
- Public access: Men only

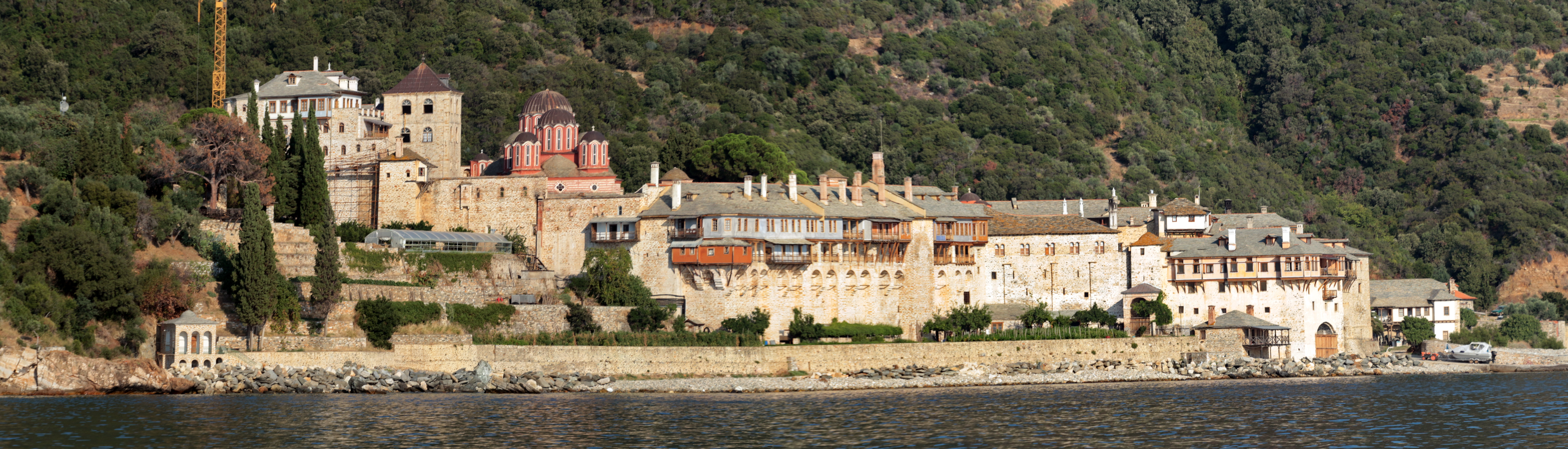
Athos, panorama of Xenophontos Monastery

Xenophontos Monastery (Greek: Μονή Ξενοφώντος) is an Orthodox Christian monastery in the monastic community of Mount Athos in Greece.

== Overview ==
Xenophontos Monastery is located on the western shore of the Athos peninsula. The monastery has 11 chapels inside and 6 outside. The monastery is notable for having two katholikons, including an older one built in the late 10th century, and another newer katholikon built in 1817. The newer katholikon from the 19th century is located right next to the main tower of the monastery, while the older katholikon is located lower down, closer to the sea.

The newer main church was built just prior to the Greek Revolution of 1821 and is in the neo-classical style. It is perhaps the largest on Mt Athos and has excellent acoustics. A large cross is suspended above the inner sanctum and the choirs of the monks do some of the best traditional Byzantine chanting in the whole peninsula; Vatopedi and Gregoriou may be its only rivals.

In 1976, Abbot Alexios of Xenophontos, a spiritual brother of Emilianos (Vafidis) of Simonopetra (as both were spiritual sons or disciples of the Metropolitan of Trikkis, Dionysios), came to Xenophontos with 17 of his monks from the Monastery of Great Meteoron, of which he had been the abbot from 1973 to 1976. He continues to lead the monastery as of 2025.

Extensive renovations are being done with money provided by the Greek Government and the European Commission; many of the workers are from Albania and live nearby. The monastery ranks sixteenth in the hierarchy of the Athonite monasteries. The community has about 55 working monks. Most are Greek, with two senior monks being American.

== History ==
In the 6th century, there was a small Christian community dedicated to Saint Dimitrios on the current site of Xenophontos Monastery. There, the chapel of Saint Dimitrios, which still survives today, was built by Saint Xenophon the Senator (d. 6th century).

The monastery was first mentioned in documents from the late 10th century. At the time, major benefactors of the monastery included the Byzantine emperor Alexios I Komnenos, who also gifted mosaic icons of Saint George and Saint Dimitrios that are still venerated at the monastery today. It was built in the tenth or eleventh century. The older katholikon (main church) was dedicated to Saint George by Xenophon, the abbot. An icon of Saint George dating from the 9th century is currently kept in the main katholikon. According to monastic tradition, it was originally in Constantinople during the iconoclast period. The iconoclasts had tried to unsuccessfully destroy it by fire and sword, and was then thrown into the sea and finally reached the monastery around the 10th century. The katholikon is dedicated to this icon of Saint George.

In 1730, the icon of the Panagia Odegetria ("Panagia the Directress"), originally kept at the right choir of Vatopedi Monastery, began to be housed at Xenophontos. According to monastic tradition, the icon had miraculously appeared at Xenophontos, even though the doors of the monastery were locked. The monks at Vatopedi returned the icon to Vatopedi, but it was then found again at Xenophontos. Afterwards, the monks at both monasteries agreed that it was the will of Panagia Odegetria to stay at Xenophontos.

In 1784, Paisios of Kafsokalyvia and his brotherhood arrived at the monastery and converted it from an idiorrhythmic to cenobitic one. Paisios became the abbot of Xenophontos and built many new buildings, including the newer Great Katholikon that was built from 1817 to 1839, as well as a new southwestern wing that was built in 1815. The 19th-century Great Katholikon has 8 domes and a marble iconostatis that was sculpted by Antonios Litra of Tinos. The icon of the Panagia Keharitomeni (literally "The Highly Favored"), which dates from the 13th century, is currently housed in the 19th-century katholikon. Other relics housed in the katholikon include the relics of the Holy Cross, Saint Dimitrios and Saint George, Saint Stephen and Saint Tryphon, the right hand of Saint Marina, and the sole of Saint Theodore of Tyre.

The campanile or bell tower was built in 1864. The campanile currently houses various workshops for the monks.

The monastery's dome sustained severe cracks following a magnitude 5.3 earthquake that hit Mount Athos in June 2025.

== Library ==
The library contains over 500 manuscripts and approximately 10,000 printed books, and also hosts a museum.

== Gallery ==
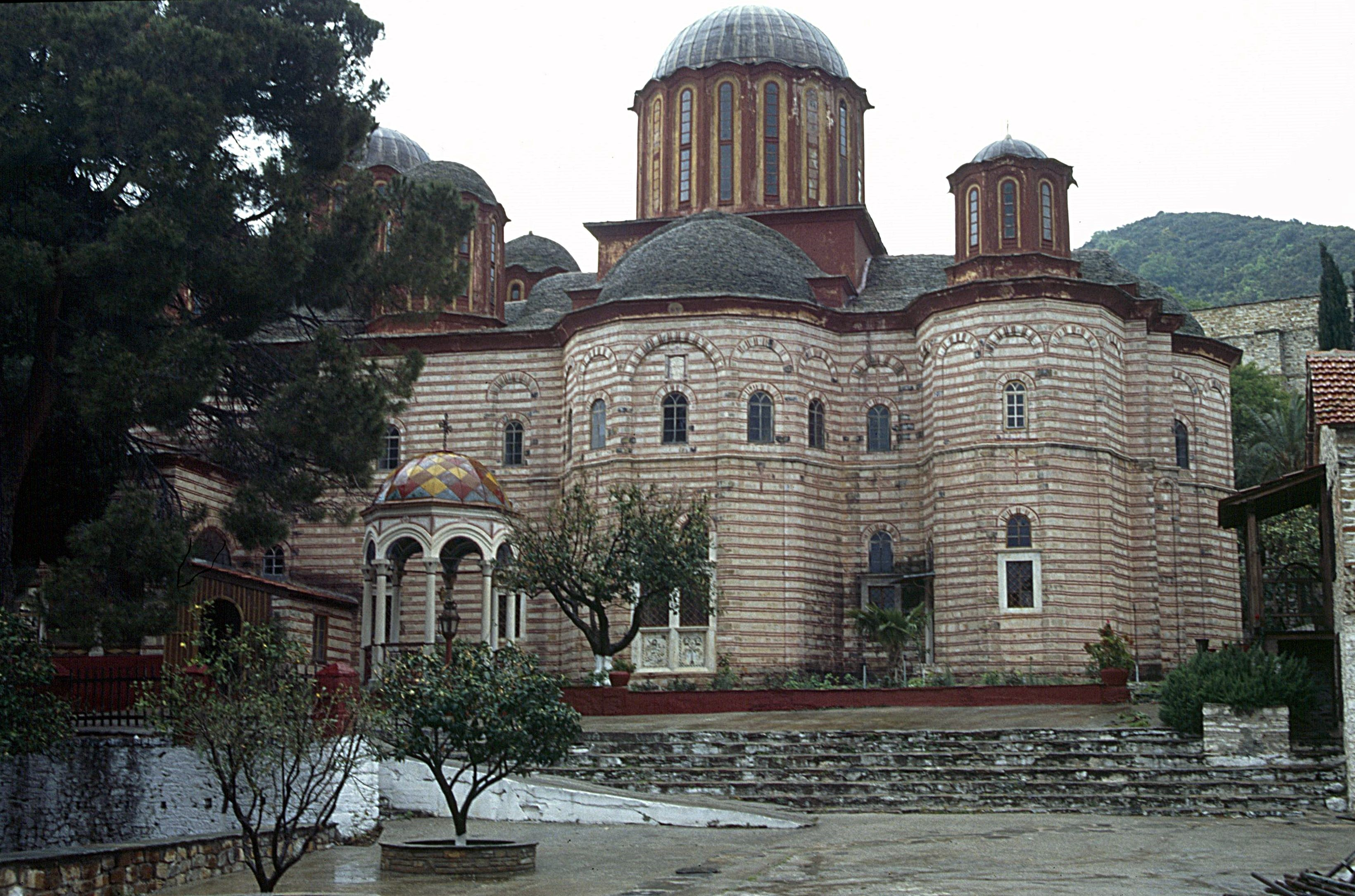
The new church

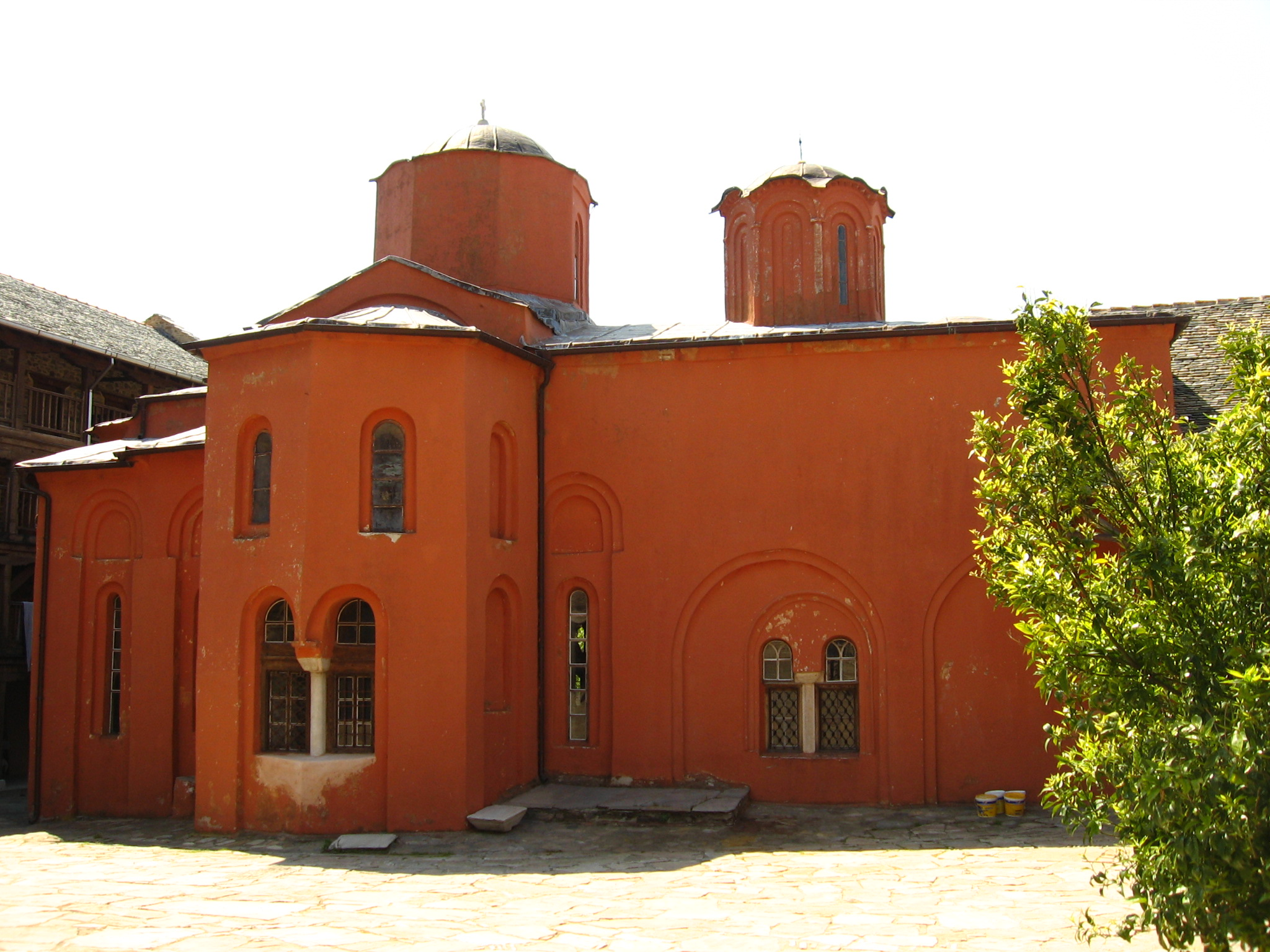
The old church

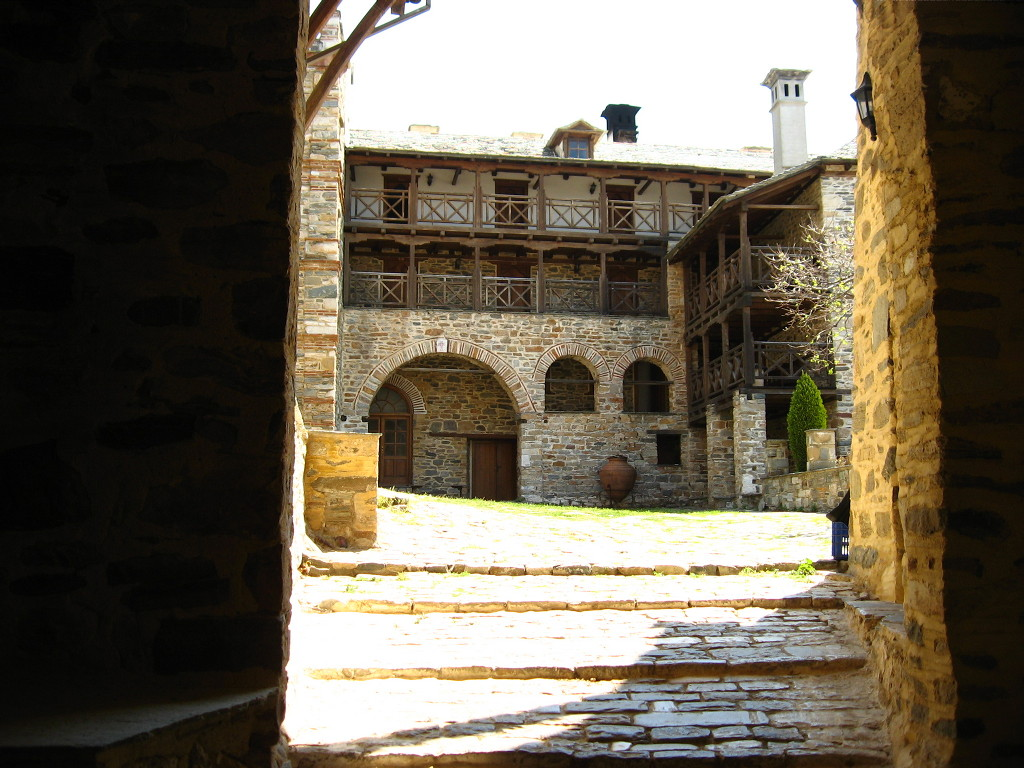
Courtyard
