= Xeropotamou Monastery =

Monastery on Mount Athos, Greece

Xeropotamou
- Ξηροποτάμου
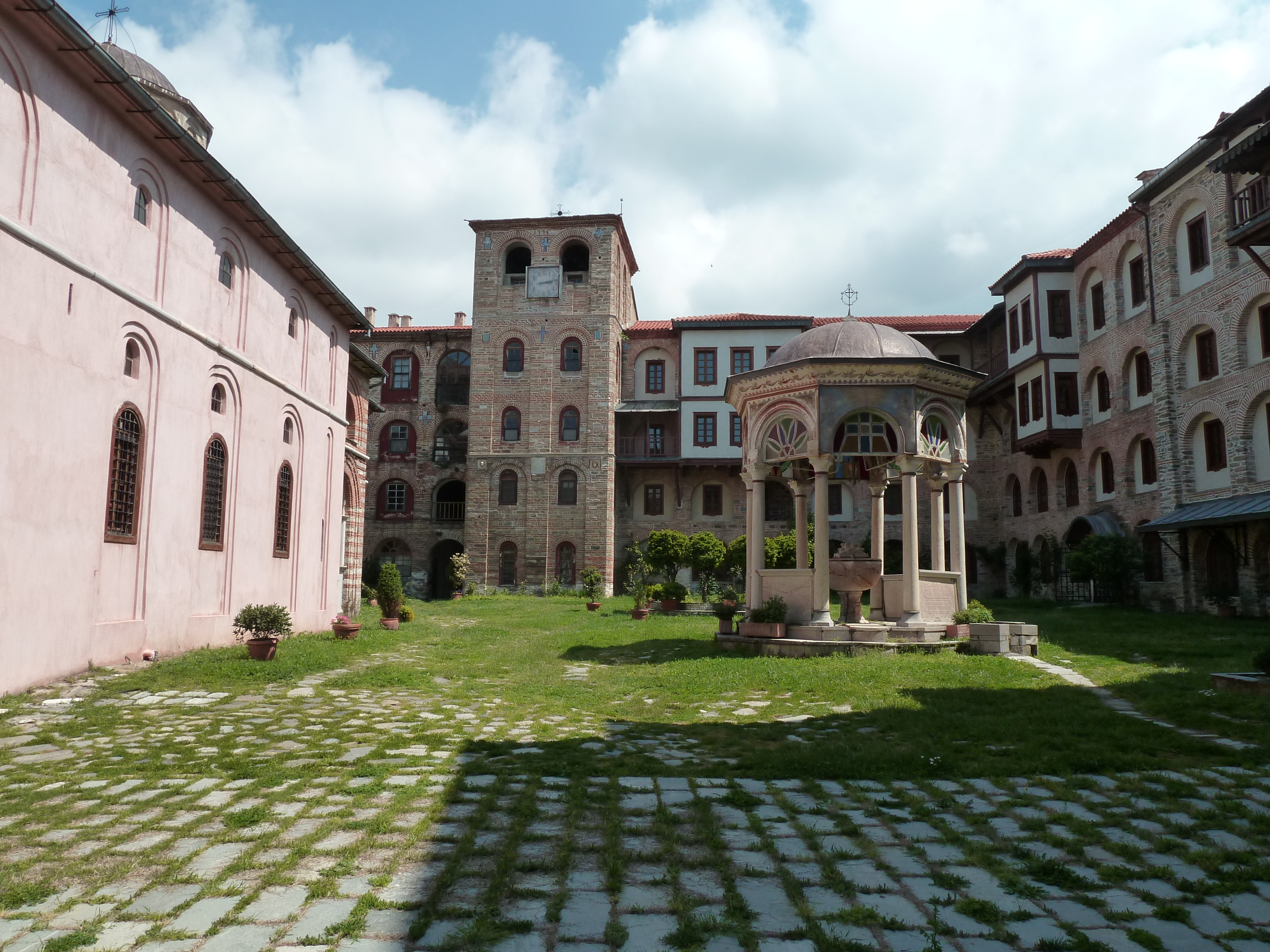
- Interior of the monastery.

- Location within Mount Athos
- Interactive map of Xeropotamou

Monastery information
- Full name: Holy Monastery of Xeropotamou
- Order: Ecumenical Patriarchate
- Dedication: Forty Martyrs of Sebaste
- Diocese: Mount Athos

People
- Founders: Alexios; Ioannis; Alexius Comnenus
- Prior: Archimandrite Elder Josef

Site
- Location: Mount Athos, Greece
- Coordinates: 40°13′40.54″N 24°13′11.33″E
- Public access: Men only

Xeropotamou monastery (Greek: Μονή Ξηροποτάμου) is an Eastern Orthodox monastery at the monastic state of Mount Athos in Greece, in the middle side of peninsula. The monastery ranks eighth in the hierarchy of the Athonite monasteries. It was founded in the 10th century, and is dedicated to the Forty Martyrs of Sebaste.

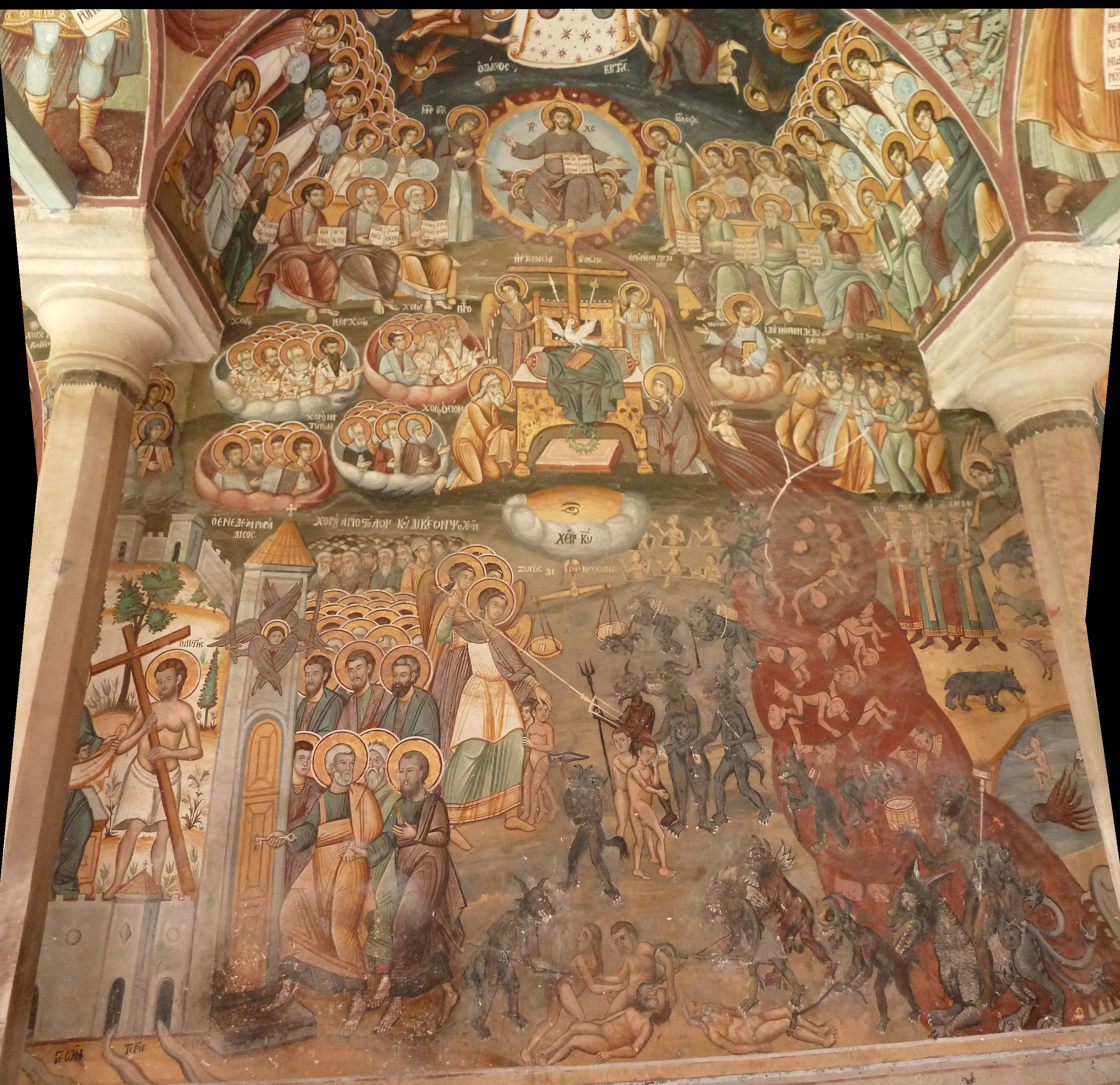
Frescoes

Xeropotamou houses numerous relics, the most prominent of which is what is thought to be the largest extant piece of the True Cross. For this reason, the monastery also celebrates a patronal feast day on September 14, the feast of the Elevation of the Holy Cross.

The library contains 409 manuscripts, and about 600 printed books. Today the monastery has about 25 monks.

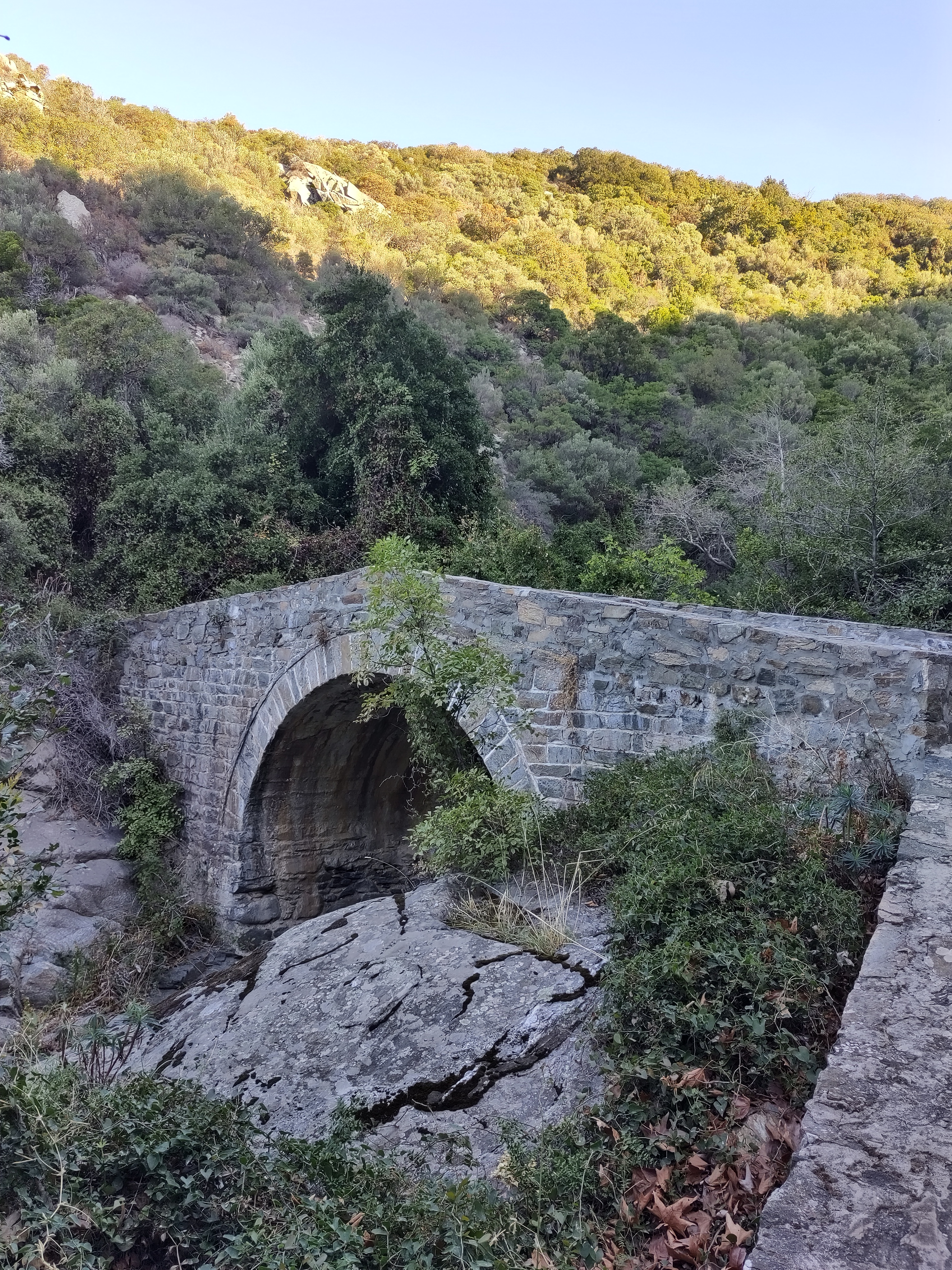
Xeropotamou Bridge

The name Xeropotamou, literally "of the dry river", refers to the ephemeral stream running near the monastery, which is a stony brook that dries up in the dry season. The brook is crossed by Xeropotamou Bridge (Greek: Γεφύρι Στην Ιερά Μονή Ξηροποτάμους), which connects Xeropotamou Monastery with St. Panteleimon Monastery.
