= Paisios of Mount Athos =

Orthodox Christian Saint and Ascetic

Saint Paisios of Mount Athos
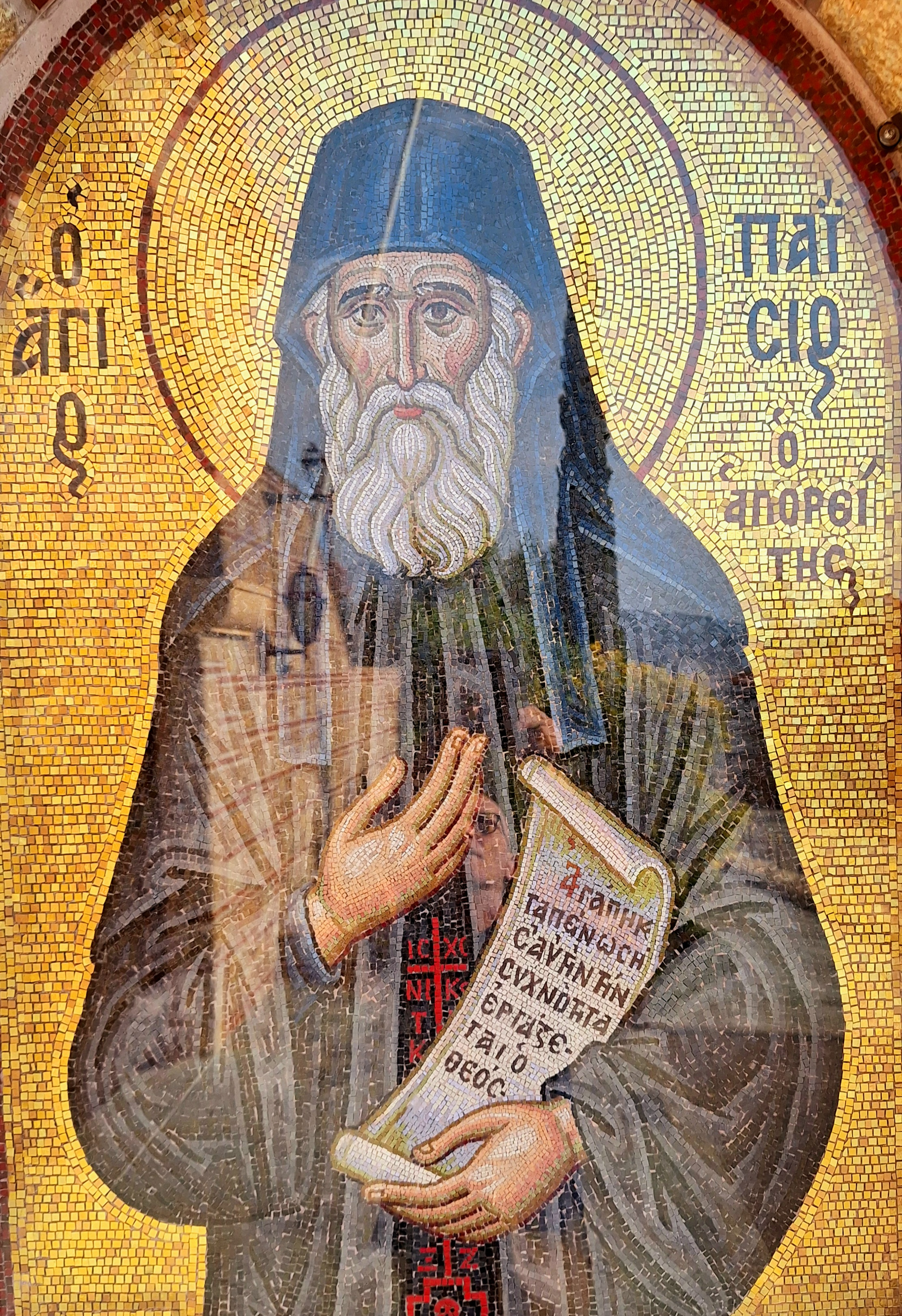
- Mosaic of Agios Paisios the Athonite on the right side of the entrance of the Monastery of Saint John the Theologian (Souroti)

Venerable Anchorite Protector of Australia
- Born: Arsenios Eznepidis; 25 July 1924; Pharasa, Cappadocia (now Çamlıca, Yahyalı, Turkey) (Note: "Pharasa is on the road connecting Kaisareia (Kayseri) with Adana, while on the side of Ala Dağ there were some narrow crossings leading to Niğde. Therefore, although Pharasa was isolated from the regional urban centres, it was connected by road with most of them.")
- Residence: Konitsa; Mount Athos; Sinai Peninsula; Souroti
- Died: 12 July 1994 (aged 69) (Note: "It was eleven in the morning on Tuesday, 12 July 1994 – the date according to the Old Calendar was equal to 29 June. He was laid to rest behind the church of Arsenios the Cappadocian."); Monastery of Saint John the Theologian, Souroti, Greece
- Venerated in: Eastern Orthodox Church
- Canonized: 13 January 2015 by Ecumenical Patriarchate of Constantinople
- Major shrine: Monastery of St. John the Theologian, Souroti
- Feast: 12 July (ns) / 29 June (os)
- Attributes: Skufia, vest, prayer rope, walking stick
- Patronage: Australia, signalmen
- Influences: Arsenios the Cappadocian, Tikhon (Golenkov), Isaac the Syrian
- Tradition or genre: Athonite Monasticism

Saint Paisios of Mount Athos (Greek: Ἅγιος Παΐσιος ὁ Ἁγιορείτης, pronounced [ˈa.ʝi.os paˈi.si.os o a.ʝi.oˈɾi.tis]; secular name: Arsenios Eznepides (Greek: Ἀρσένιος Ἐζνεπίδης), known during his lifetime as Elder Paisios (Greek: Γέροντας Παΐσιος); 25 July 1924 – 12 July 1994) was a Greek Eastern Orthodox ascetic from Mount Athos, originally from Pharasa, Cappadocia. Today, he is widely venerated by Eastern Orthodox Christians, particularly in Greece, Romania, Bulgaria, Georgia, Russia, North Macedonia, Serbia, Montenegro and Syria.

Paisios was canonized on 13 January 2015 by the Holy Synod of the Ecumenical Patriarchate, and the church commemorates his feast day on June 29 [OS] / July 12 [NS].

== Biography ==
=== Early life ===
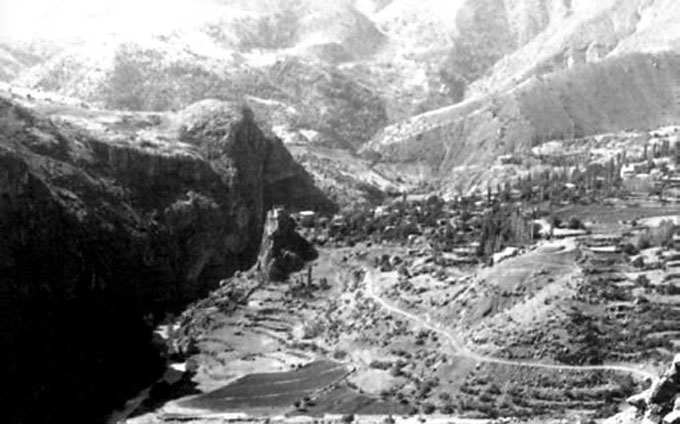
Pharasa, Cappadocia, in Turkey, the birthplace of Paisios

Arsenios Eznepides was born on 25 July 1924 in Pharasa, Cappadocia, shortly before the population exchange between Greece and Turkey. He was baptized by Arsenios the Cappadocian, who gave him the name Arsenios after himself and is said to have foretold the child's future as a monastic. Following the population exchange, the Eznepides family settled in Konitsa, Epirus, where Arsenios spent his childhood. After completing intermediate public school, he learned carpentry and developed an interest in Byzantine chant under the guidance of his uncle, Prodromos.

=== Military service ===
During the civil war in Greece, Arsenios served as a radio operator. In 1945, he enlisted in the Hellenic Army. With bravery and self-sacrifice, he requested to fight on the front line instead of family men, so that their families would not suffer the pain of losing a loved one. Later, extolling the value of monasticism to those who doubted it, he said, "There are monks who have spiritual television and are God's radio operators." He is characterized in his biography as one of them. His fundamental teaching was, "If you want to 'catch' God so He can hear you when you pray, turn the dial to humility, for this is the frequency on which God operates." In 2017, by decision of the Holy Synod of the Church of Greece, he was proclaimed the patron saint of the military communications corps, in which he had served.

=== Monastic life ===
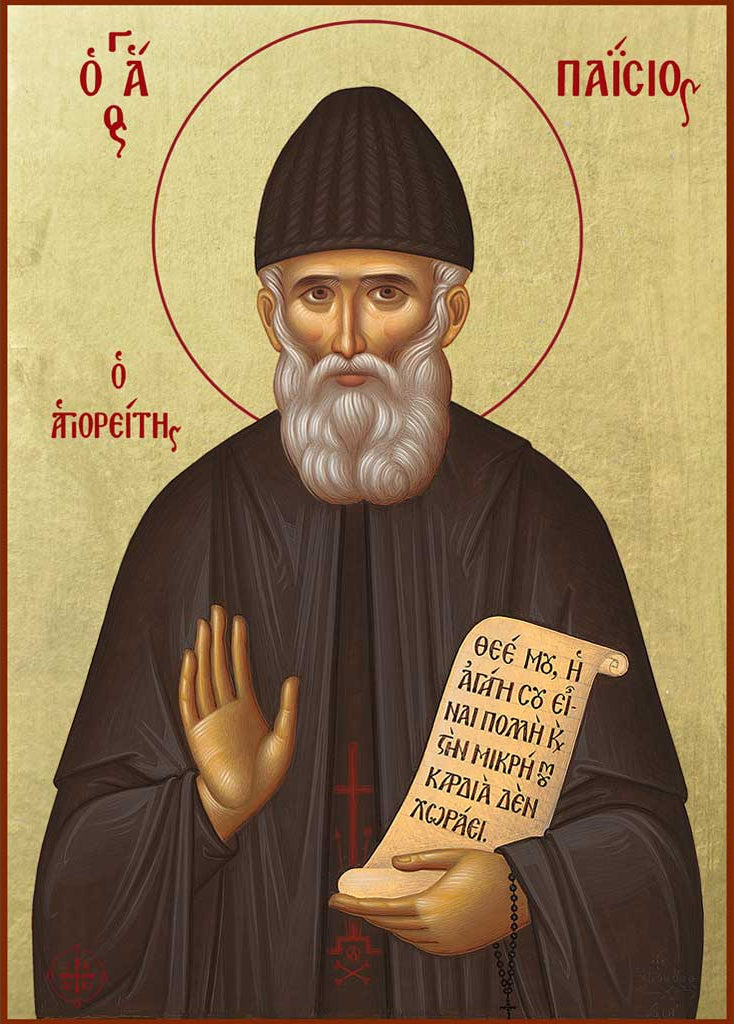
Icon of Saint Paisios of Mount Athos

In 1950, having completed his service, he went to Mount Athos: first to Fr. Kyril, the future abbot of Koutloumousiou Monastery, and then to Esphigmenou Monastery.

Arsenios, having been a novice for four years, was tonsured a Rassophore monk on 27 March 1954 and was given the name Averkios.

Soon after, he went to the (then) idiorrhythmic brotherhood of Philotheou monastery, where his uncle was a monk. While there, he was under the obedience of Symeon. On 12 March 1957, Symeon tonsured Averkios to the Small Schema, giving him the name Paisios, in honour of the indefatigable Metropolitan of Caesarea, Paisios II, whose native village was Pharasa.

In 1958, Paisios was asked to spend some time in and around his home village to support the faithful against the proselytism of Protestant groups. He greatly encouraged the faithful there, helping many people. Afterwards, in 1962, he left to visit Saint Catherine's Monastery on Sinai, where he stayed for two years. During this time, he became beloved by the Bedouins, who benefited from his presence both spiritually and materially, as Paisios used the money he received from the sale of his carved wooden handicrafts to buy food for them.

On his return to Mt. Athos in 1964, Paisios took up residence at the Skete of Monastery of Iviron before moving to Katounakia, at the southernmost tip of Mt. Athos, for a short stay in the wilderness there. Paisios' failing health may have been part of the reason for his departure. In 1966, he underwent lung surgery. It was during this period of hospitalization that his long friendship with the then-young sisterhood of St. John the Theologian in Souroti, just outside Thessaloniki, began. Paisios would place the relics of Arsenios the Cappadocian in this monastery. During his operation, he needed a large amount of blood, and a group of novices from the monastery donated blood to save him.

On 11 January 1966, Paisios received the Great and Angelic Schema from Tikhon at the Hermitage of the Holy Cross of the Monastery of Stavronikita. After Tikhon's death on 10 September 1968, Fr. Paisios resided in that hermitage.

In 1968, he spent time at the Monastery of Stavronikita.

Gabriel of the Cell of St. Christodoulos of Koutloumousiou Monastery and Philothei of Souroti are disciples of Paisios the Athonite.

In 1979, Paisios moved to Panagouda, a hermitage belonging to Koutloumousiou Monastery. It was here that his renown grew. Between prayer and assisting his visitors, he rested only two or three hours each night.

=== Death and burial ===
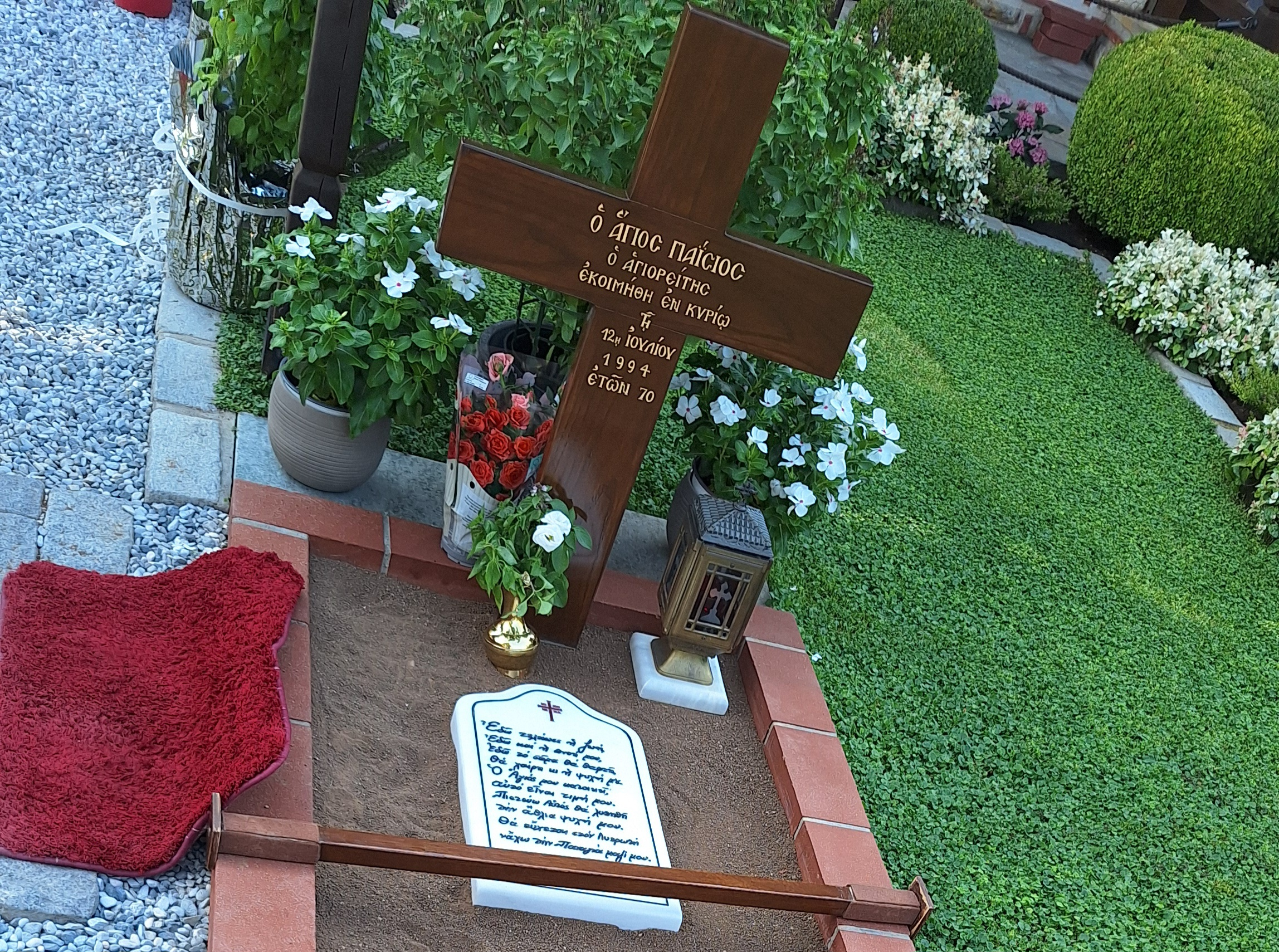
The tomb of Saint Paisios of Mount Athos

On 5 October 1993, Paisios left Mount Athos to receive medical treatment. Although he had intended to be away for only a few days, he was diagnosed with cancer requiring immediate surgery. After recovering from surgery, he was transferred to the Monastery of St. John the Theologian in Souroti. Although he wished to return to Mount Athos, his health did not permit it, and he asked Philothei of Souroti to convey his wish to be buried in Souroti to the local metropolitan. The metropolitan agreed.

Paisios died on 12 July 1994, having received Holy Communion the previous day. He was buried at the Monastery of Saint John the Theologian in Souroti, Thessaloniki, next to Arsenios the Cappadocian, a saint whose biography Paisios had written.

== Attributed prophecies ==
A number of geopolitical prophecies have been attributed to Paisios by Hieromonk Makarios of Mount Athos. These include a Turkish invasion of Greece that will lead to the formation of a Greater Greece, and the liberation of other lands including Northern Epirus, the rest of Macedonia, Bithynia, Pontus, Ionia and Constantinople, the return of the descendants of Greek refugees to their places of ancestry and the conversion of a part of the Turks from Islam to Orthodox Christianity. He is regarded to have said "The Turks shall be destroyed. They will be eradicated."

Hieromonk Makarios of Mount Athos claims to have recorded many of Paisios' prophecies and published them in 1990, when Paisios was still alive, under the title "Words of Wisdom and Grace of the Elder Paisios the Hagiorite".

Some see many of the Saint's prophecies as having already been fulfilled, including changes to Greek political landscape, Brexit and more.

Rod Dreher compared Paisios's status as a modern mystic in the Eastern Orthodox world to that of Padre Pio in the Catholic world.

=== Authenticity ===
Claims of specific geopolitical prophecies attributed to Paisios have been widely criticized for being derived from word of mouth and not being substantiated by credible sources, especially those promoting various forms of alarmism. Some of Paisios' associates have claimed that specific political prophecies attributed to him were never actually said by him, as Paisios was known to have been largely apolitical.

In an official statement by the Esphigmenou Monastery of Mount Athos, the issue was addressed via the following statement: "...Some are reporting catastrophes, let us not do them a favor. The Elder would say that it would be shocking for God to love Greece. The Holy Administration had no monk come forward to tell of such events. Neither the Holy Administration nor the Holy Community of Mount Athos knows of these events."

== Legacy and veneration ==
=== Canonization ===
The Holy Synod of the Ecumenical Patriarchate canonized Elder Paisios on 13 January 2015. (Note: "The Holy and Sacred Synod convened today, Tuesday, 13 January 2015, with His All-Holiness presiding for its regular monthly meeting, for the purpose of examining various items on its agenda. During this session, the Holy and Sacred Synod: a) unanimously accepted the proposal of the Canonical Committee to incorporate the monk Paisios of Mt. Athos into the registry of the Saints of the Orthodox Church...") Paisios' process toward acknowledged sainthood happened quickly according to church standards and was the second-fastest process in recent church history. On Sunday 17 January 2015 many faithful from across the Balkans went on pilgrimage to the monastery in Souroti, which Paisios helped found in 1967; this culminated in five nights of continuous prayers. Archbishop Damianos of Sinai, abbot of St. Catherine's Orthodox Monastery in Egypt's Sinai peninsula since 1973, was also present at the ceremonies. (Note: "Saint Paisios spent two years with us (at St. Catherine's)...We are praying for God's and St. Paisios' enlightenment, so that Greece may be saved," he said.)

The Holy Synod of the Russian Orthodox Church decided at its meeting of 5 May 2015 also to add the name of the Venerable Paisios of Mount Athos to the Menology of the Russian Orthodox Church, establishing his feast day on June 29/July 12, aligning with the Menology of the Orthodox Church of Constantinople during the present century.

=== Patronages ===
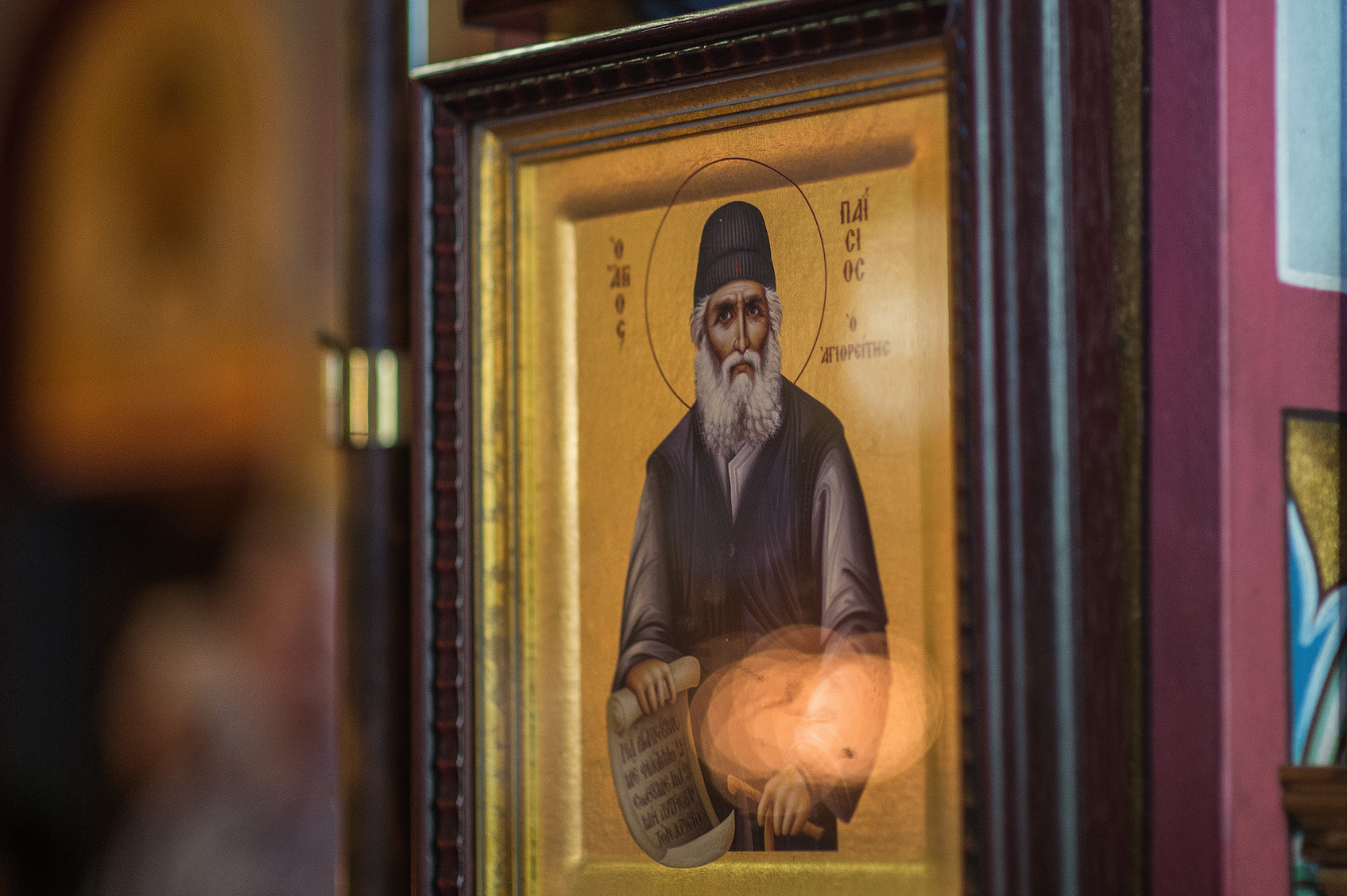
Icon of St. Paisios in Cathedral of St. John the Baptist, Washington, DC

On Sunday 25 January 2015 the first church in the world to be dedicated to Saint Paisios the Athonite was consecrated in central Limassol, Cyprus, in the neighbourhood of Ekali, across from Tsirion Stadium. The sacred service began at 6 pm with the reception of the holy relics of Hieromartyr Heraclides, Bishop of Tamassos (September 17), of Saint Cosmas of Mount Athos, (Note: It is unclear which saint this refers to: Saint Cosmas of Vatopedi (1276) and the Venerable monks of Karyes Skete on Mount Athos, (5 December); or; New Hieromartyr Cosmas of Aetolia, Equal-to-the-Apostles (1779), (24 August).) and of the New Martyr George of Cyprus (April 23). These were placed respectively in the three altars of the new church, which was thus dedicated to Saint Arsenios of Cappadocia (November 10), to Saint Paisios of Mount Athos (July 12), and to the holy Martyrs Barachisius and Jonah (March 29), given that the church in Pharasa, Cappadocia, which was Arsenios' and Paisios' village and place of birth, was dedicated in honour of the Martyrs Barachisius and Jonah.

On Saturday 11 July 2015, the first church in Greece to be dedicated to Saint Paisios was consecrated in Nea Efesos, Pieria. Metropolitan George (Chrysostomou) of Kitros, Katerini and Platamonas (el) officiated at the thyranoixia or consecration. In 2017 on the feast day of Saint Paisios, Metropolitan Nikolaos (Protopappas) of Phthiotis remarked that "Saint Paisios was the saint of the dispirited and of sinners". While Metropolitan Seraphim (Papakostas) of Kastoria stated that "Saint Paisios is the response to those who question the presence of God". On Sunday 24 February 2019, the first Athonite church dedicated to St. Paisios the Athonite was consecrated by Metropolitan Panteleimon (Kalafatis) of Xanthi. The church is located in Kapsala, in the area between Karyes and the monasteries of Pantocrator and Stavronikita, where there used to be a skete.

On October 2, 2023, Saint Paisios was formally declared as the Protector of Australia, and Patron Saint of the Greek Orthodox Archdiocese of Australia by Archbishop Makarios.

== Published works ==
=== English (translated) ===
- Saint Arsenios the Cappadocian, translated into English and published in 1989 and 2001 by Holy Monastery "Evangelist John the Theologian", Souroti, Thessaloniki, Greece.
- Elder Hadji-Georgis the Athonite, translated into English and published in 1996 by Holy Monastery "Evangelist John the Theologian", Souroti, Thessaloniki, Greece.
- Athonite Fathers and Athonite Matters, translated into English and published in 1999 by Holy Monastery "Evangelist John the Theologian", Souroti, Thessaloniki, Greece.
- Epistles, by Elder Paisios of Mount Athos, translated into English and published in Feb 2002 by Holy Monastery "Evangelist John the Theologian", Souroti, Thessaloniki, Greece; distributed in the US by St. Herman of Alaska Monastery.
- Spiritual Counsels, Vol. 1: With Pain and Love for Contemporary Man
- Spiritual Counsels, Vol. 2: Spiritual Awakening, 1999 & 2000.
- Spiritual Counsels, Vol. 3: Spiritual Struggle, 2001.
- Spiritual Counsels, Vol. 4: Family Life, 2012.
- Spiritual Counsels, Vol. 5: Passions and Virtues, 2016.
- Spiritual Counsels, Vol. 6: On Prayer, 2022.

=== Greek ===
- Λόγοι Ϛʹ· Περί Προσευχής, Ἱερὸν Ἡσυχαστήριον Μοναζουσῶν "Εὐαγγελιστὴς Ἰωάννης ὁ Θεολόγος". 2012 (Spiritual Counsels, Vol. 6: On Prayer, Holy Monastery "Evangelist John the Theologian". 2012)
- Ὅσιος Παΐσιος ο Αγιορείτης, "Ωφέλιμες Διηγήσεις", Ιερά Μονή Αγίου Ιλαρίωνος Πρόμαχοι Αριδαίας. 2016 (a collection of written narratives of the saint found in his private notebook of notes, typed down and published)
- Ὅσιος Παΐσιος ο Αγιορείτης, Σημεία των Καιρών ("Signs of The Time", handwritten letter of the saint towards the society on coming events and the future)
- "Το Τετράδιο του Γέρωντος Παϊσίου", ed. Protopresbyter Georgios Manos, Ορθόδοξος Κυψέλη, 2009. (notices by the Saint on Metanoia and the Sacrament of Penance; printed with commentary and supplemental prayers)
- Ὅσιος Παΐσιος ὁ Ἁγιορείτης, "Ὁ μικρὸς Ἀνθόκηπος - Ἁγιογραφικὰ καὶ πατερικὰ χωρία ἐπιλεγμένα ἀπὸ τὸν Ἃγιο Παΐσιο τὸν Ἁγιορείτη", ed. by Ἱερὸν Ἡσυχαστήριον "Εὐαγγελιστὴς Ἰωάννης ὁ Θεολόγος". Βασιλικά Θεσσαλονίκης, 2018. (The Garden of Flowers - quotes from the Church fathers and from hagiography selected by the Saint Paisios of the Holy Mountain)
- "Γέρωντος Παϊσίου Αγιορείτου, Διδαχές και Αλληλογραφία", Εκδόσεις Η Μεταμόρφωσις του Σωτήρος, Μήλεσι. 2007 (teachings and correspondence of the saint)

== Orthodox hymns ==
Kontakion

Thou, O Father, didst say with words enlightened by the Holy Spirit that many saints would have desired to live in our times, in order to strive for salvation.
For Thou didst herald to us, who live in darkness, that the time is almost ready and that those that now struggle valiantly to win their salvation will receive a martyr's reward.
For this we thank God, Who with mercy looked on His people, sending His Saint for our enlightenment, and thus with voices of joy we gladly sing to our All-Gracious Master the song: Alleluia!

Apolytikia

Tone 1, To the melody “O citizen of the desert...”

O you faithful, let us honor Paϊsios, the offspring of Phárasa, / the glory of Athos, emulator of the Holy Ascetics of old, and equal to them in honor; / O grace-filled vessel, who hastens speedily to the pious faithful who cry out: / “Glory to Him Who strengthened you. / Glory to Him Who crowned you. / Glory to Him Who, through you, works healings for all.”

As the Patron, Guardian and Protector of Australia

Tone 5, to the melody: “The Co-eternal Word"

O Protector of Australia, vigilant guardian and resplendent pillar of Mount Athos, we the faithful let us praise the holy Paisios, and beseeching his intercessions before God, crying out with one voice, deliver us, O father of all, from the arrows of the vengeful one.

== See also ==
- Porphyrios the Kausokalyvite
- Saint Paisios (Pishoy)
- Agios Paisios, Apo ta Farasa ston Ourano

== Sources ==
- Hieromonk Isaac. Saint Paisios of Mount Athos. Translated by Hieromonk Alexis (Trader) PhD, and Fr. Peter Heers. Edited by Hieromonk Alexis (Trader) PhD, Fr. Evdokimos (Goranitis) and Philip Navarro. 2nd Edition. Holy Monastery of "Saint Arsenios the Cappadocian", Chalkidiki, Greece, 2016. ISBN 978-960-89764-5-0 (Exclusive distributor for U.S. and Canada St. Nektarios Monastery, Roscoe, NY.)
- Hieromonk Isaac. Elder Paisios of Mount Athos. Transl. Hieromonk Alexis (Trader) PhD, and Fr. Peter Heers. Ed. by Hieromonk Alexis (Trader) PhD, Fr. Evdokimos (Goranitis) and Philip Navarro. Holy Monastery of "Saint Arsenios the Cappadocian", Chalkidiki, Greece, 2012. ISBN 978-960-89764-3-6
- Middleton, Herman A. "Elder Paisios the Athonite". In: Precious Vessels of the Holy Spirit: The Lives & Counsels of Contemporary Elders of Greece . 2nd Ed. Protecting Veil Press, Thessalonica, Greece, 2004.
- Athanasios Rakovalis. Talks with Father Paisios. Published in Thessaloniki in 2000. (Distributed by St. Nicodemos Publications)
