= Koutloumousiou Monastery =

Eastern Orthodox monastery, Mount Athos

- Μονή Κουτλουμουσίου
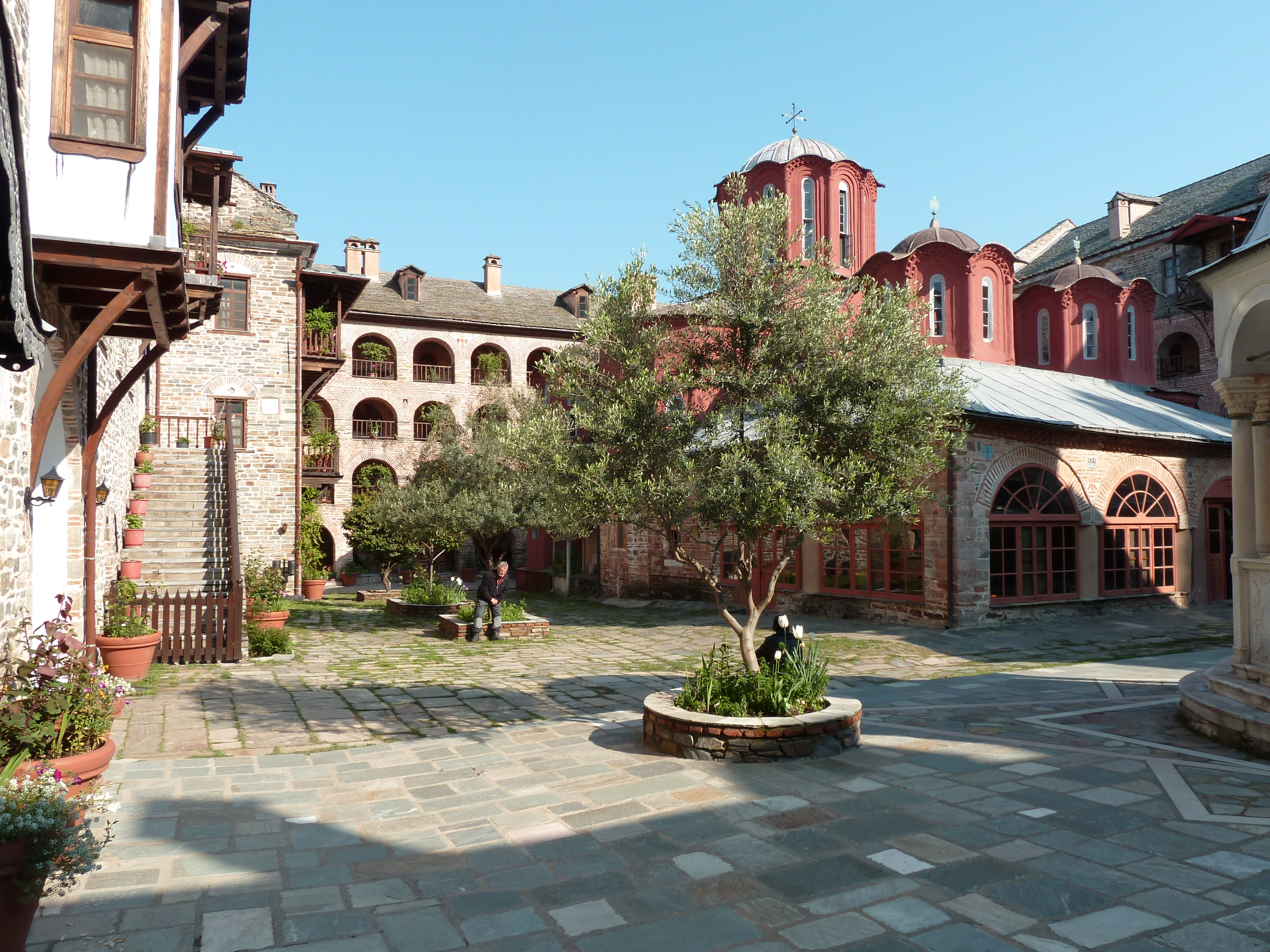
- Interior of the monastery.

- Location within Mount Athos
- Interactive map of Koutloumousiou Monastery

Monastery information
- Full name: Holy Monastery of Koutloumousiou
- Order: Ecumenical Patriarchate
- Dedication: Transfiguration of the Saviour
- Diocese: Mount Athos

People
- Prior: Archimandrite Elder Nikolaos

Site
- Location: Mount Athos, Greece
- Coordinates: 40.2536°N 24.2472°E
- Public access: Men only

The Koutloumousiou Monastery (Greek: Μονή Κουτλουμουσίου) or Koutloumousi (Greek: Κουτλουμούσι pronounced [kutluˈmusi]) is an Eastern Orthodox monastery in the monastic state of Mount Athos in Greece. It is connected with Karyes by the Koutloumousiou Bridge (Greek: Γεφύρι στην Ιερά Μονή Κουτλουμουσίου). The monastery ranks sixth in the hierarchy of the Athonite monasteries, and has 30 working monks according to the 2021 census. Another 65 monks live in its annexes (sketes, cells, and hermitages). The monastery's library contains 662 manuscripts and approximately 5,200 printed books.

It was founded in the 11th century by Kallistos Koutloumous, an orthodox monk from the city of Iconium in Asia Minor. The first benefactor was the Byzantine Emperor Alexios I Komnenos, who appreciated the piety of Kallistos and strengthened the Monastery.

The present-day Monastery was raised with the help of voivodes Nicolae Alexandru and Vladislav Vlaicu of the House of Basarab from Wallachia, while other Wallachian voivodes contributed with substantial financial donations.

== History ==
According to tradition, the Monastery was constructed between 1063 and 1069 by Kallistos Koutloumous, a member of the Seljuk dynasty from Iconium in Asia Minor who converted to Christianity. The first benefactor of the Monastery was Emperor Alexios I Komnenos. In written records, the monastery of Koutloumousi was first mentioned in a document from 1169. In the following centuries, the Monastery went through difficult times with plunders committed in the aftermath of the Fourth Crusade and killings done by Michael VIII Palaiologos after the Second Council of Lyon. The Monastery was also raided by Catalan mercenaries between 1307 and 1309.

In 1263, the Protos of Mount Athos granted the cell of Saint Elijah to the monastery. The deserted Stavronikita Monastery was also ceded to Koutloumousiou in 1287. By 1316, the Monastery was on the 17th place in the Athonite monastery hierarchy.

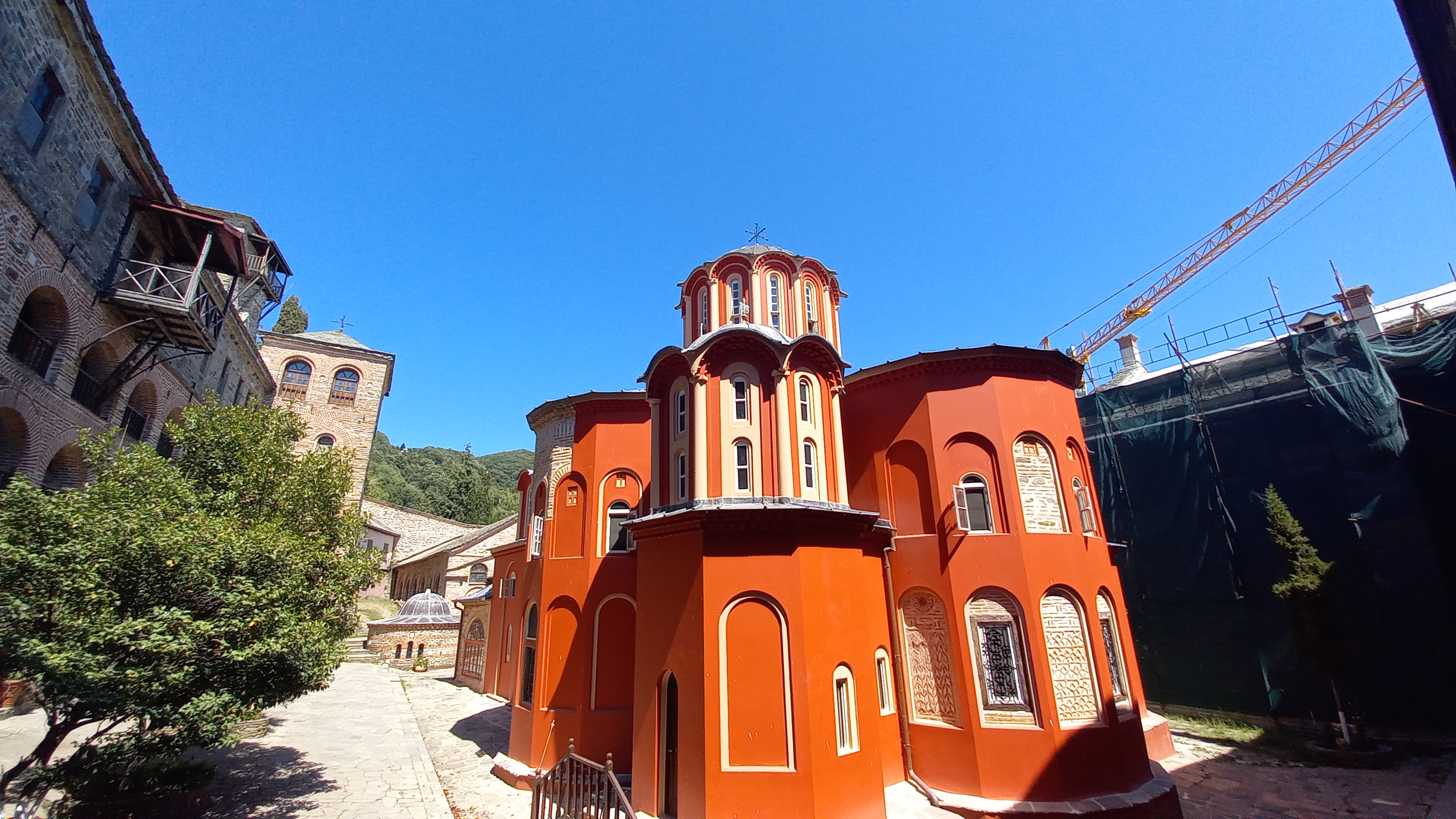
Katholikon of the Monastery in 2024

After the establishment of the Metropolis of Ungro-Wallachia in 1359, the relations between the Wallachian Voivodes and Mount Athos began. The first voivode to grant substantial support to Koutloumousiou was Nicolae Alexandru. The support was continued by his son, Vladislav Vlaicu. Shortly after Alexandru died in 1364, Vlaicu agreed to support the expansion of the Monastery as planned by its abbot, Chariton of Imbros, on the condition that both should be considered equal ktetors of the Monastery. Vlaicu also demanded that the Monastery should become idiorrhythmic in order to facilitate the settlement of Wallachian monks in it. After the demands were eventually accepted by Chariton, the construction works on the Monastery began. These included the defensive wall, towers, and the Katholikon (Church).

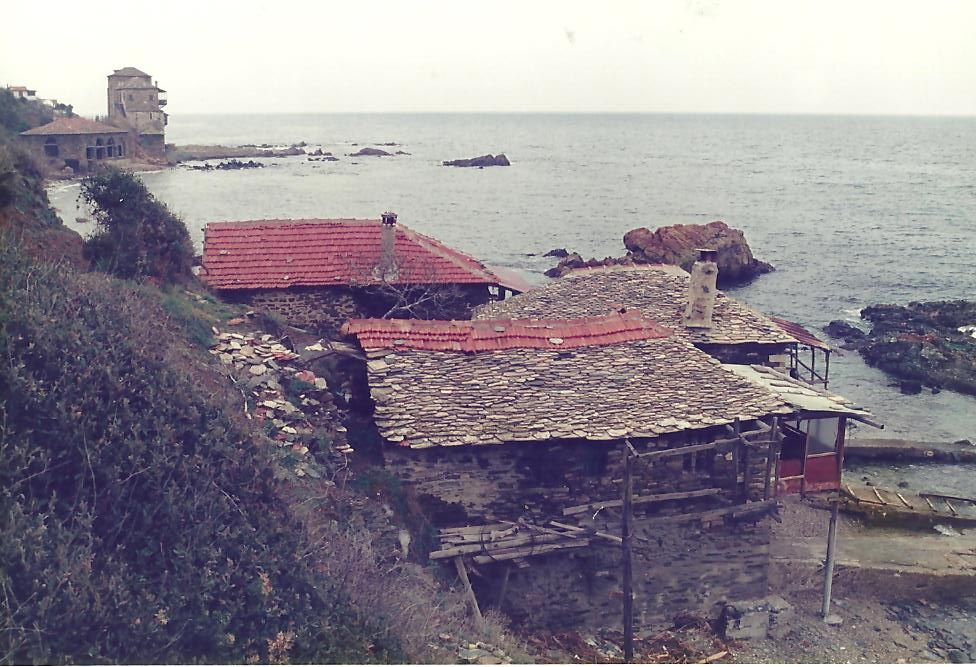
The dock and watch tower (αρσανάς, arsanás) of Koutloumousiou

Donations to the Monastery were continued by the Wallachian Voivodes such as Mircea the Elder, Laiotă Basarab, Basarab the Young, Vlad II Dracul, Vlad IV the Monk, Vlad VI Înecatul, Vlad VII Vintilă, Radu the Great, and Neagoe Basarab or by their boyars. In 1393, the Monastery was proclaimed as a stauropegion by Patriarch Antony. Koutloumousiou was also granted villages and other tithes from Wallachia by Mircea the Elder.

By the early 15th century, Koutloumousiou occupied the St. Alypius Monastery, officially annexing the abandoned establishment in 1428. In 1497, the Monastery was damaged by a fire but was restored with aid from Wallachia. During this time, Radu the Great began the restoration works on the Monastery, works which were completed by his successor Neagoe Basarab. As described by Hieromonk Gavriil Protul, Voivodes Radu and Neagoe built the wall with towers and gates, and also built a refectory, cellar, bakery, kitchen, garden, infirmary, tavern, guest house, barn, treasury, and other houses for all needs. The central church and its cells were also well decorated. A harbor surrounded by a wall for small and large ships was also constructed. Neagoe Basarab also began referring to the Koutloumousiou Monastery as "the great lavra of Wallachia". Following these restorations, the Monastery reached the sixth place in the hierarchy of the Athonite monasteries in 1574, a place it still holds to this day.

Under the Ottoman rule, an economic crisis caused by high taxes and seizure of monastic estates led to the decrease of the number of monks at the Monastery. In 1797, a fire destroyed the east wing of the Monastery and the damage was repaired with assistance from Patriarch Matthew of Alexandria. The Phanariot voivodes of Wallachia such as Alexander Mourouzis, Alexander Ypsilantis, and Michael Soutzos continued supporting the Monastery.

Koutloumousiou returned to cenobitic monasticism in 1856, after 500 years of idiorrhythmic lifestyle. Support from Romania stopped in 1863 when Prince Alexandru Ioan Cuza confiscated the monastery estates from the country. The last major donation from the country to the Monastery happened when landlady Marghioala Procopie Canusi sent help to rebuild Koutloumousiou after a fire in 1870.

While trying to return to the cenobitic lifestyle, and after a fire had destroyed the northern wing of the monastery in 1856, pro-Russian elements infiltrated the monastery attempting Russification of the strategically placed Greek monastery. With the interventions from General Sevastianov and ambassador Ignatyev, the Russians managed to twice depose the canonical abbot Ioasaf, aiming to appoint a Russophile hieromonk from St. Panteleimon as abbot. Ultimately, the brotherhood of the monastery succeeded in restoring Ioasaf with help from the English ambassador to Constantinople and agreement of the Ecumenical Patriarchate, the Russian Pan-Slavic ideas failing to influence Koutloumousiou.

A period of decline continued in the 20th century, the monastery being abandoned in the aftermath of World War II and the eastern wing burning down in 1980. At the same time, the arrival of new monks, including Saint Paisios, led to a new period of growth for Koutloumousiou.

== Architecture and other buildings ==
The Monastery has the shape of an irregular quadrilateral, with the east and south sides being occupied by three-story arched wings. A stone-built L-shaped building is attached to the western wall. The wall also features lead-roofed domes and a defensive tower built in 1508 which houses the icon vault. Also on the western wall stands the refectory of the monastery, rebuilt by Patriarch Matthew of Alexandria after the fire of 1767. The marble-built octagonal phiale and the holy water cistern are located in the prominent part of the courtyard. Both were constructed in the 19th century by a sculptor from a Tinian workshop. The Katholikon (church) is located in the center of the Monastery. It was built shortly after 1369 and is an enlargement of an older and smaller church. The narthex and the main church are fully frescoed in the iconographic style of the Cretan school.

There are 10 chapels within the monastery. The Chapel of Our Lady Fovera Prostassia (Formidable Protection), constructed in 1733, houses a wonder-working icon of the same name dating to the 13th or 14th century. The Monastery has 18 kellia and also possesses the Skete of Saint Panteleimon. Additionally, Koutloumousiou has four hermitages in the Kapsala area.

== Library ==
Located in the northern wing of the Monastery, the library contains about 5,200 printed books dating from 1500 to 1890. Primarily printed in Venice, Vienna, Leipzig, Paris, Constantinople and various Romanian presses, these books are written in a variety of languages and cover diverse topics from theology to medicine. The library also has 950 codices on parchment or paper, the oldest dating to the 9th century. A collection of music manuscripts and illustrated manuscripts is also maintained.

The collection of documents contains Byzantine chrysobulls and charters of Alexios Komnenos and Andronikos Palaiologos, firmans issued by Ottoman sultans as well as decrees and letters from Wallachian voivodes.

== Relics and treasures ==
The treasury of Koutloumousiou consists of exquisitely adorned liturgical and priestly vestments, consecrated vessels, crosses for blessings and processions, chalices, reliquaries containing the relics, and various other sacred objects.

The holy relics preserved at the Monastery come from several Saints. These include the left foot of Saint Anne, the left hand of Saint Gregory the Theologian, the jawbone of Saint Charalambos, and the skull of Saint Alypius. The Monastery also houses a piece of the Holy Cross.

== Notable people ==
- Kallistos Koutloumous, founder of the Monastery, orthodox monk from the city of Iconium in Asia Minor
- Patriarch Matthew of Alexandria, lived at Koutloumousiou from 1766 after donating all his possessions to the Monastery
- Bartholomew Koutloumousianos, lived at the Monastery from 1793 to 1803 and again from 1847 to his death in 1851
- St. Paisios of Mount Athos
- Father Christodoulos, who became Abbot of Koutloumousiou in 1975 after migrating with 8 monks from a monastery in Euboea

== Gallery ==
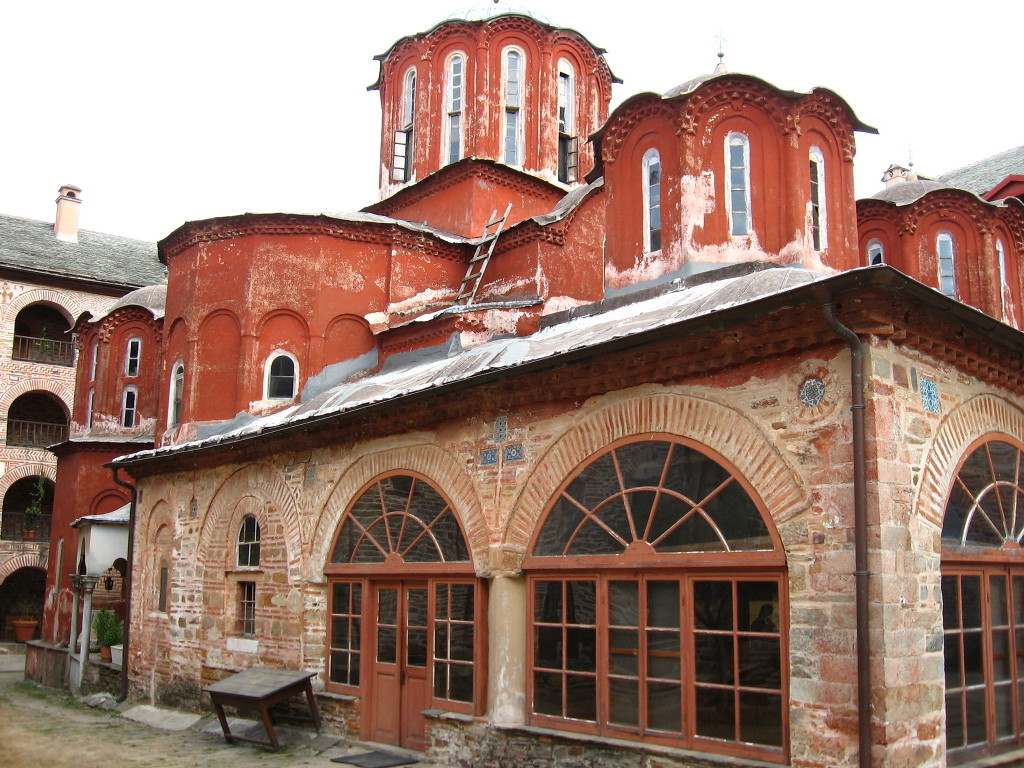
The church of the monastery in 2007

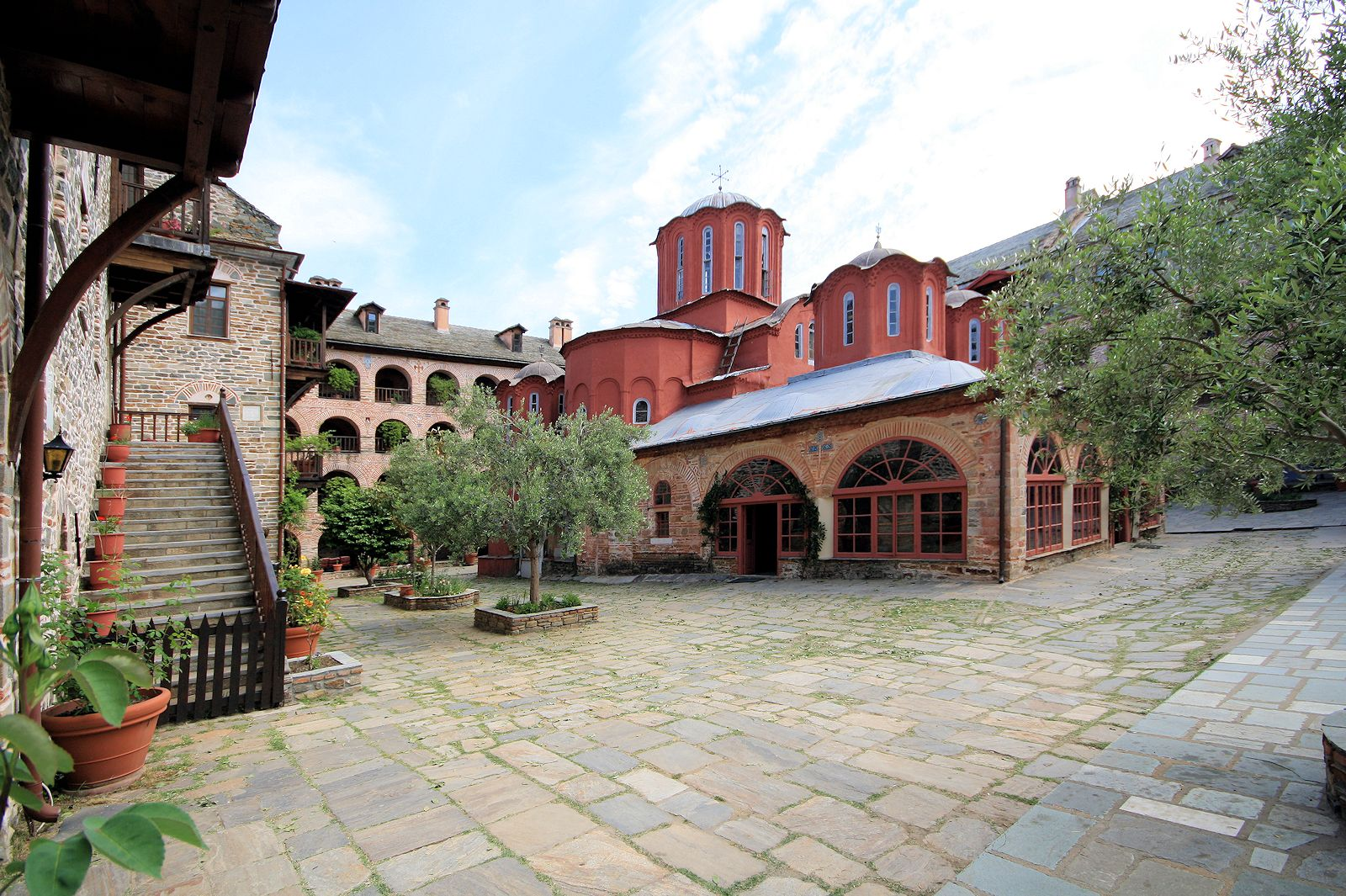
The Katholicon seen from the courtyard

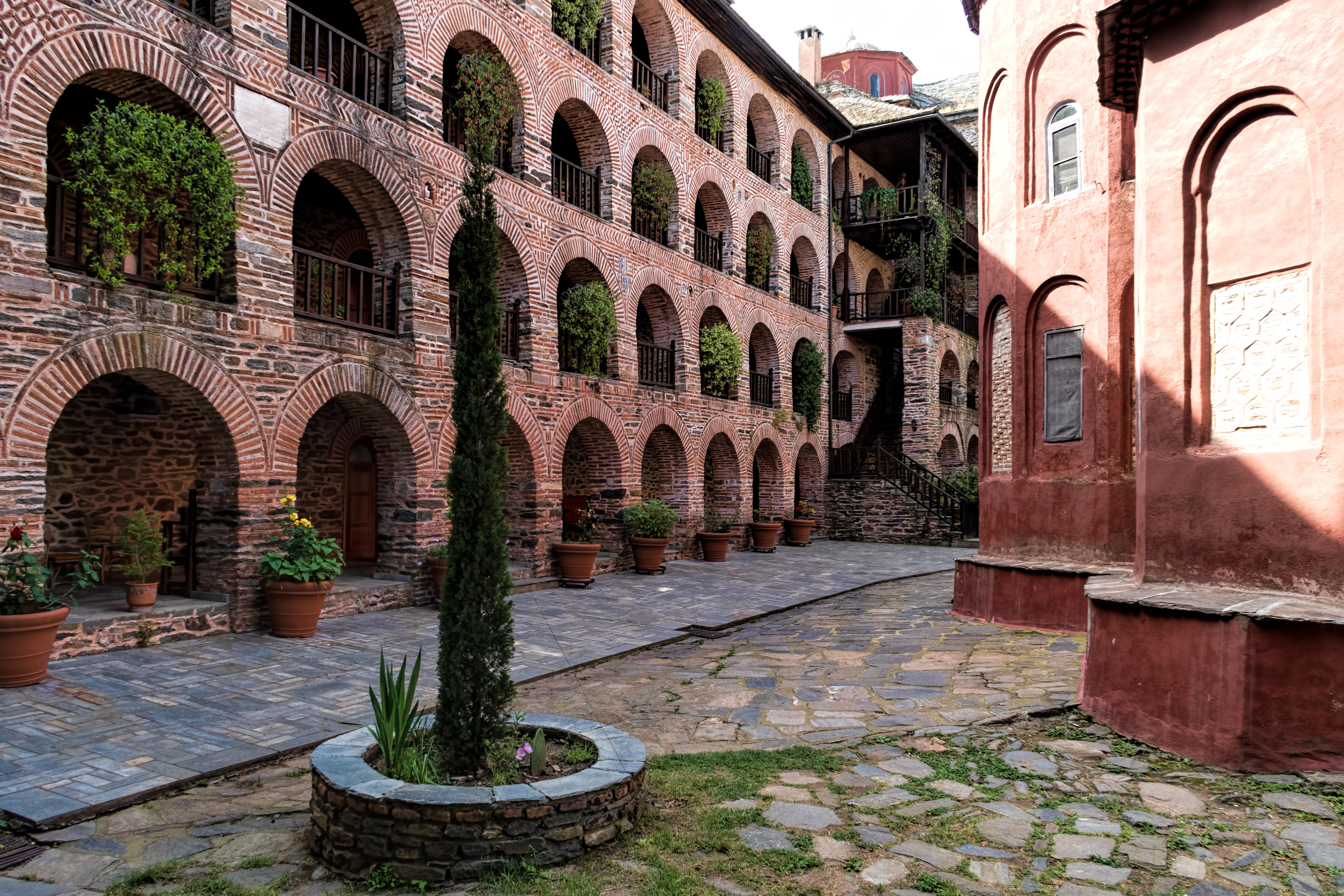
A wing of monks' cells seen from the courtyard

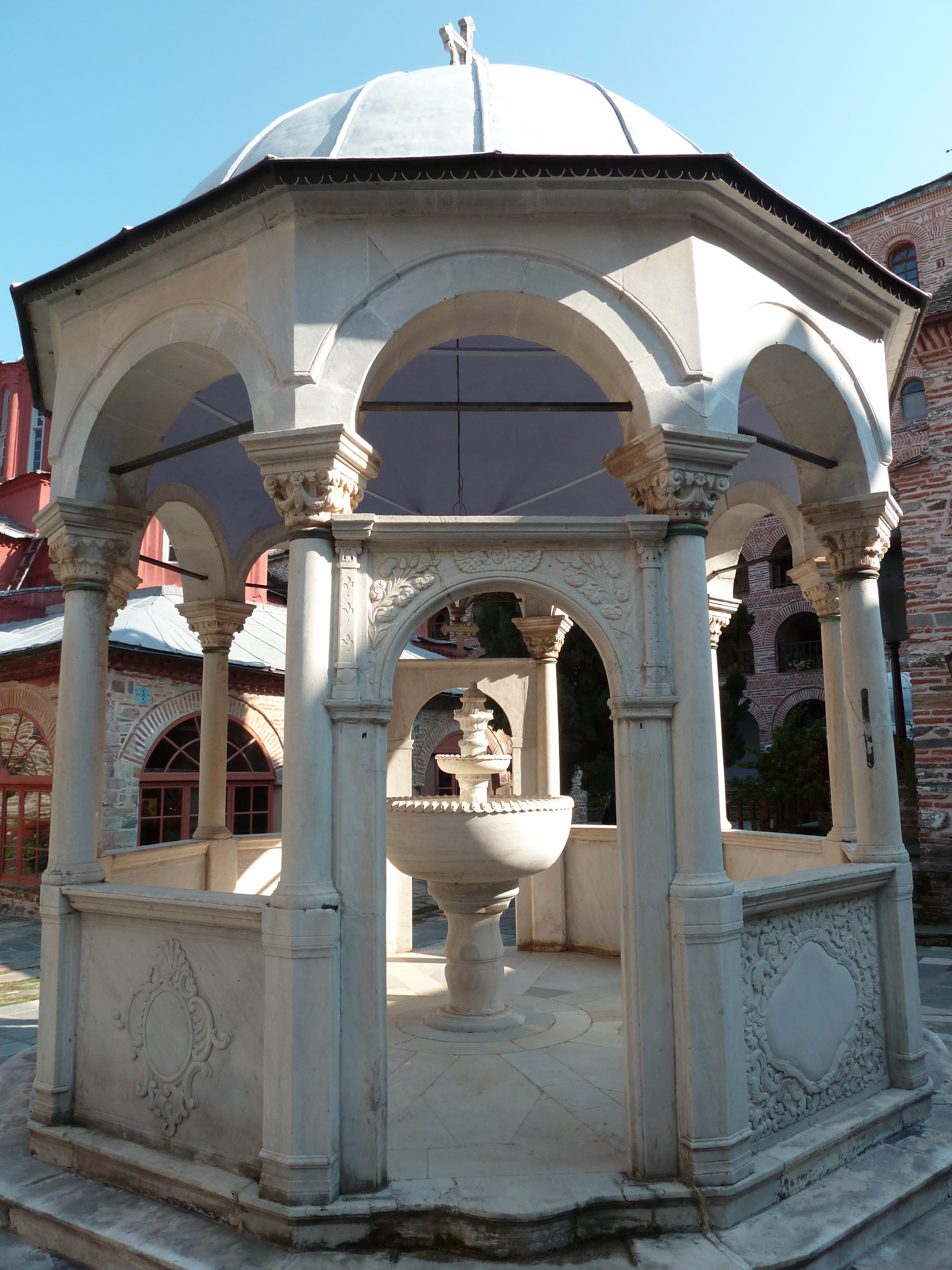
The phiale of the Monastery

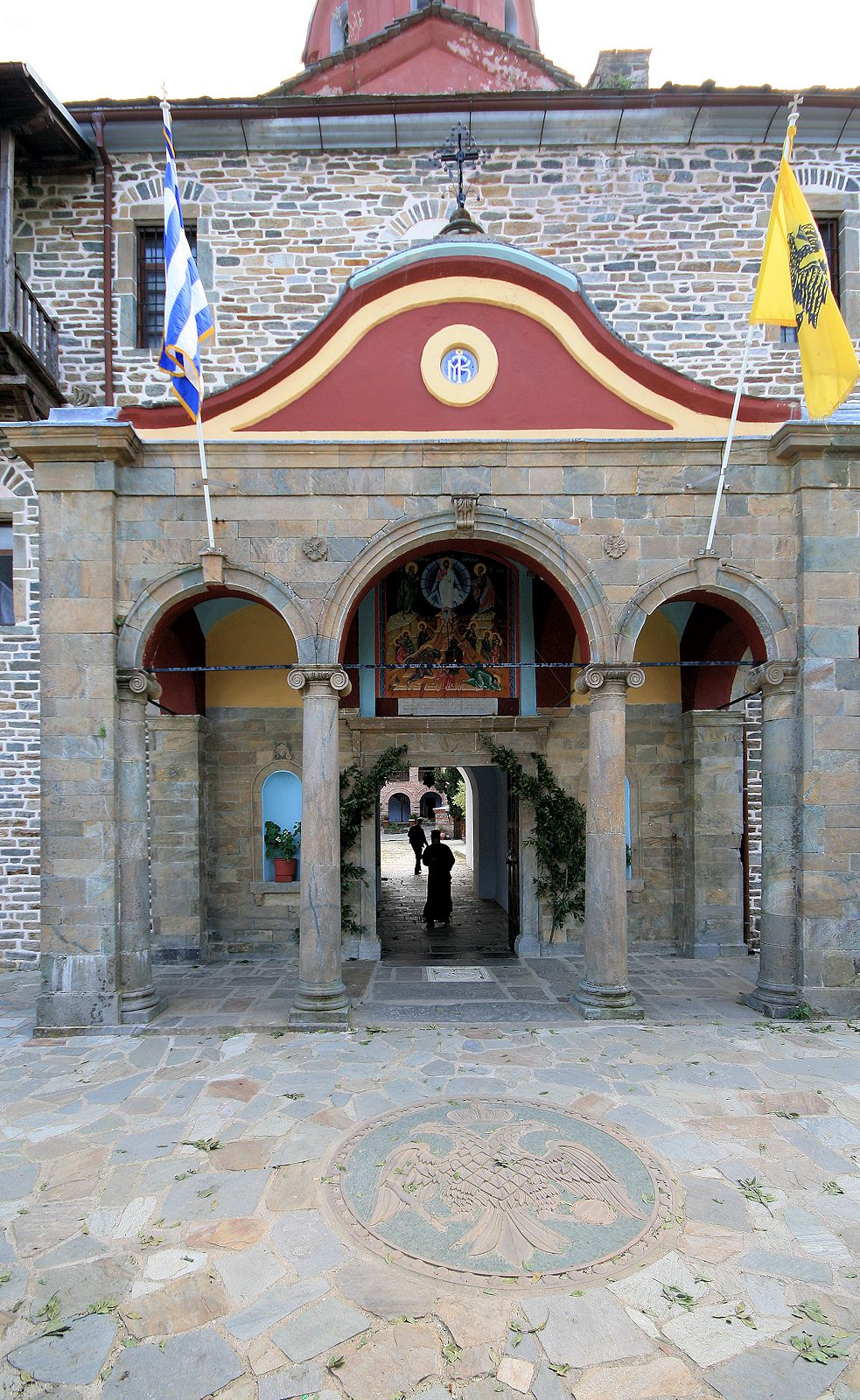
Entrance to the Monastery

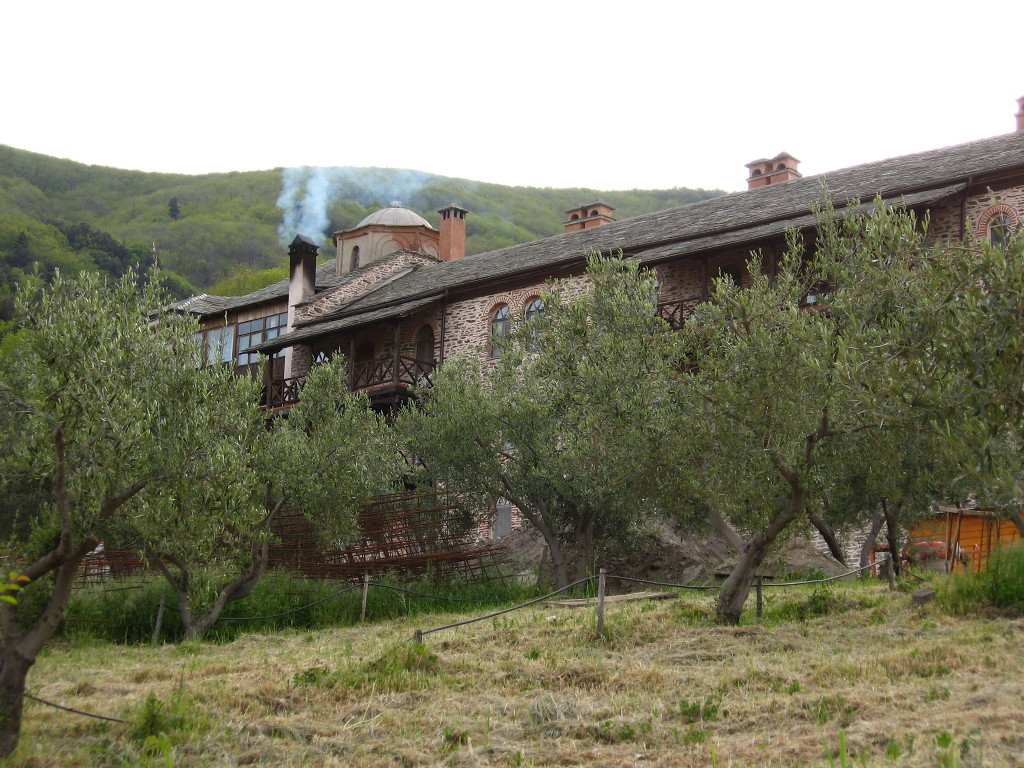
Olive trees near the Monastery
