= Kapsala, Mount Athos =

Kapsala Καψάλα
- Settlement
- Location within Greece
- Coordinates: 40.2684063884°N 24.2459264775°E
- Country: Greece
- Administrative region: Mount Athos
- Elevation: 381 m (1,250 ft)
- Time zone: UTC+2 (EET)
  - Summer (DST): UTC+3 (EEST)

Kapsala (Greek: Καψάλα) is a settlement in Mount Athos, Greece.

== Geography ==
Kapsala is located between Pantokratoros and Stavronikita monasteries. It can be reached from the road that goes to Pantokrator from Karyes. Kapsala can be divided into upper Kapsala (administered by Pantokratoros Monastery), located by the central dividing ridge of the Athonite peninsula, and lower Kapsala, located by the eastern coastline of the peninsula. The less inhabited parts of lower Kapsala are administered by Stavronikita monastery.

== Demographics ==
Kapsala is inhabited by monks living an idiorrhythmic lifestyle in cells (kellia) and huts (kalyvae).

== Notable people ==
- Elder Tikhon (Golenkov) of Kapsala (20th century), the spiritual father of St. Paisios the Athonite
- Elder Philaret of Kapsala (20th century)
