= Dikme =

Dikme may refer to:

== Places ==
- Dikme, Bitlis, village in Bitlis province, Turkey
- Dikme, Kayseri, village in Kayseri province, Turkey

== People ==
- Mehmet Dikme, Minister of Agriculture of Bulgaria from 2001 to 2005
- Umut Dikme, snooker player, competitor in 2018 Paul Hunter Classic
