= Agios Paisios, Apo ta Farasa ston Ourano =

- Genre: Drama; Biography; Era
- Created by: Stamos Tsamis
- Written by: Giorgos Tsiakkas
- Directed by: Stamos Tsamis
- Starring: Nikitas Tsakiroglou; Smaragda Smyrnaiou; Dimitris Xanthopoulos; Dimitris Imellos; Prokopis Agathokleous; Christina Pavlidou
- Country of origin: Greece
- Original language: Greek
- No. of seasons: 2
- No. of episodes: 21

Production
- Executive producer: Foss Productions
- Producers: Green Olive Films; Institute "Saint Maximos the Greco"
- Running time: 50-70 minutes

Original release
- Network: Mega Channel; Alpha TV Cyprus
- Release: February 10, 2022 – April 13, 2025

Agios Paisios, Apo ta Farasa ston Ourano (English: Saint Paisios, From Pharasa to Heaven) is a Greek biographical television series dedicated to the life of Saint Paisios of Mount Athos, broadcast in Greece by the Mega Channel television station and in Cyprus by the Alpha TV Cyprus television station. The series premiered on 10 February 2022 and the first season concluded on 7 April 2022. The second season began on 24 January 2025 and concluded on 13 April 2025. Filming took place in places where Saint Paisios lived, such as Konitsa, Mount Sinai and Mount Athos.

== Plot ==
The story begins with the birth of Saint Paisios, born Arsenios Eznepidis, in Farasa, Cappadocia. A few days before the people of Farasa abandoned their village, he was baptized by Saint Arsenios the Cappadocian, where he took his name “to leave a monk at his feet”. After the Treaty of Lausanne, the family of little Arsenios was uprooted and took the path of refuge to Greece. Together with his family, they temporarily settled in Corfu, but soon they would depart for Konitsa, Epirus, where little Arsenios would take his first childish steps.

His grandmother and mother transmitted their faith and love for the Lord. He grew up with stories about Saint Arsenios and the desire to follow the monastic life flared up in him from an early age. In 1945 he joined the army where he served as a radio operator. Upon his discharge, he visited Mount Athos. However, he soon returned to Konitsa for family reasons and remained there for three years. He left for Mount Athos permanently in March 1953 and ended up at the Esphigmenou Monastery. After three years, he found himself at the Philotheou Monastery, where he became a monk and took the name "Paisios". He sent a photograph of himself to his mother with which he bid her farewell and told her that he would now have the Virgin Mary as his mother.

== Cast ==
- Nikitas Tsakiroglou Saint Arsenios of Cappadocia
- Smaragda Smyrnaiou as Chatzichristina
- Dimitris Xanthopoulos as Prodromos Eznepidis
- Dimitris Imellos as Iordanis
- Christina Pavlidou as Evlogia Eznepidis
- Drosos Skotis as Prodromos Kortsinoglou
- Despoina Gatziou as Kyra-Despoina
- Prokopis Agathokleous as Saint Paisios
- Giorgos Armenis as Elder Kyrillos
- Giannis Stankoglou as Theodoros
- Kostas Apostolakis as Abbot Kallinikos
- Rinio Kyriazi as Kyra-Giorgena
- Thanasis Zeritis as Stamatis
- Christos Loulis as Protosyggelos of the Metropolis Konitsis
- Georgia Kouvaraki as Christina Eznepidis
- Konstantinos Prassas as Rafail Eznepidis
- Giannis Leakos as Charalampos Eznepidis
- Tasos Palantzidis as Gero-Thymios
- Manos Vakousis as Priest
- Maria Philippou as Aikaterini Rousi
- Christos Georgalas as Konstantinos Rousis
- Konstantinos Elmatzioglou as Father Damianos
- Zacharias Goela as Efthymios/Father Gerasimos/Father Athanasios
- Georgos Mpiniaris as Metropolitan of Konitsis
- Marina Kalogirou as Abbess Philothei
