= Monastery of Saint John the Theologian (Souroti) =

Greek Orthodox monastery in Souroti, Greece

Monastery of St. John the Theologian
- Ιερά Μονή Αγίου Ιωάννη του Θεολόγου στη Σουρωτή
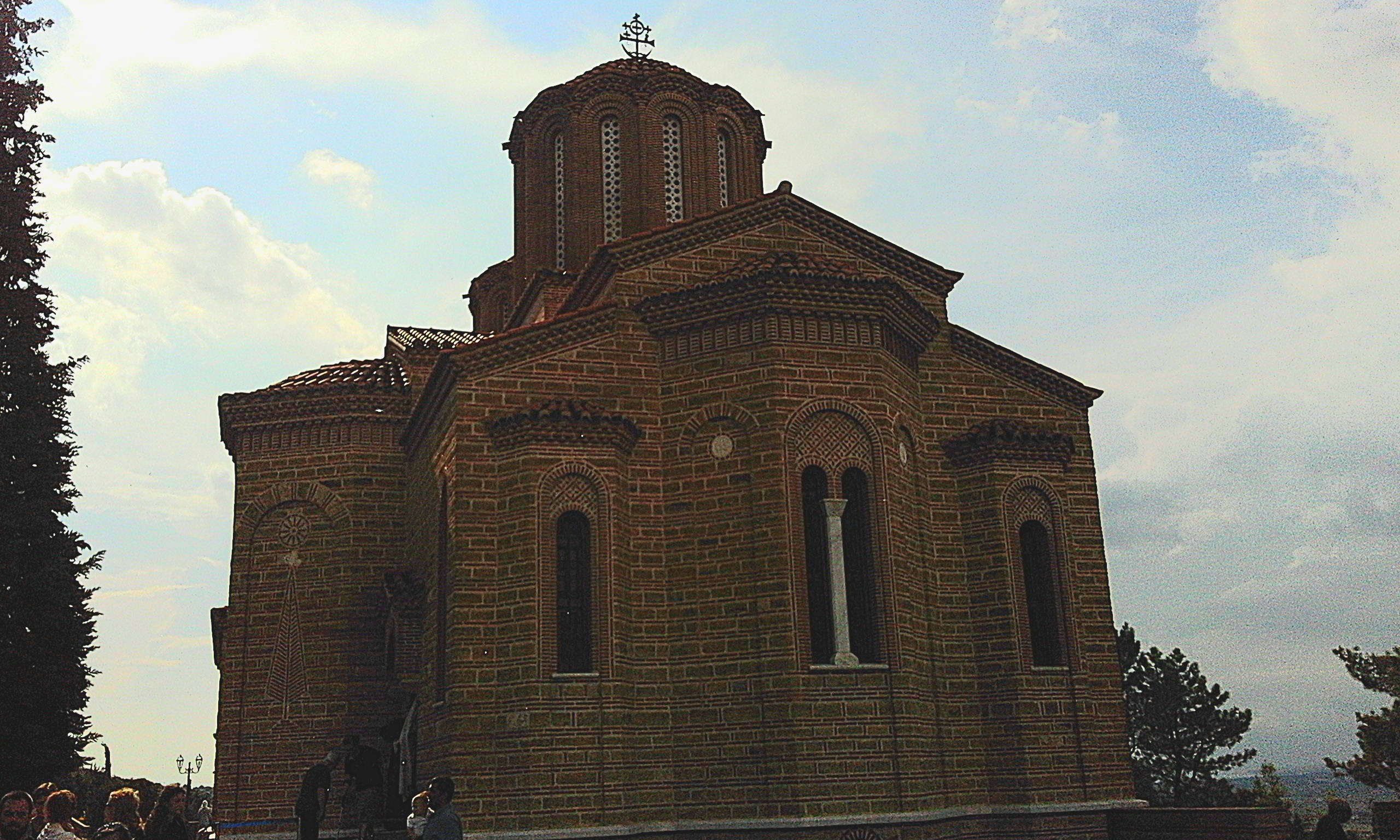
- Holy Monastery of St. John the Theologian.-SOUROTI

Religion
- Affiliation: Greek Orthodox Church
- Region: Thessaloniki
- Patron: St. John the Theologian

Location
- Country: Greece
- Interactive map of Monastery of St. John the Theologian
- Coordinates: 40°28′28″N 23°4′16″E

Architecture
- Established: 1967

Website
- agiospaisios.gr

The Monastery of St. John the Theologian (Greek: Ιερά Μονή Αγίου Ιωάννη του Θεολόγου στη Σουρωτή) is a Greek Orthodox Christian nunnery located in Souroti, Greece. It was founded in 1967. The hegumen of the monastery is Philothei of Souroti since 1967.

The tomb of Saint Paisios of Mount Athos is located in the monastery. The relics of Saint Arsenios the Cappadocian are also kept in the monastery.

The monastery has a publishing house that publishes books in both Greek and English.
