= Skete of Saint Panteleimon =

Skete in Mt. Athos Monastic Community, Greece

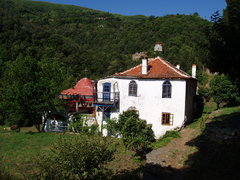

- Location within Mount Athos
- Interactive map of Skete of Saint Panteleimon

Monastery information
- Order: Greek Orthodox

Site
- Location: Mount Athos; Greece
- Coordinates: 40.2531°N 24.2589°E
- Public access: Men only

The Skete of Saint Panteleimon or Skete of Agiou Panteleimonos, not to be confused with the monastery of the same name, some kilometres away, is a skete of the Koutloumousiou monastery in Mount Athos, Greece. The skete is one of only a handful of Idiorrhythmic monasteries in the world.

The Skete was founded in 1785 by the monk Charalampos near the town of Karies, and is a dependent of the Koutloumousiou monastery. Today the skete consists of 19 cells with 20 monks, a library with 40 manuscripts of more than 500 books, as well as a church housing 200 icons and saintly relics.
