= Philothei of Souroti =

- Occupation: Christian nun
- Position held: hegumen (1967–)

Philothei of Souroti (in Greek: Φιλοθέη της Σουρωτής, Philothéï tis Sourotis), is the hegumen of the Monastery of Saint John the Theologian in Souroti.

She holds this position since the monastery’s foundation in 1967.

== Biography ==
Born Philothei Samaras, she is from Trikala. In 1967, she was entrusted with the management of the newly founded Monastery of Saint John the Theologian in Sourotí, having been unanimously chosen by the other nuns.

She maintained a connection with Paisios of Mount Athos and built a relationship of trust with him. Notably, she was the one who requested permission from the Metropolitan of Kassandreia for Paisios to be buried at the monastery when he was bedridden with cancer and unable to make the request himself. The metropolitan granted the monk’s wish as conveyed by the hegumen.

In 2015, together with other sisters of the monastery, she presented an icon of Saint Paisios in their name to the Ecumenical Patriarch of Constantinople, Bartholomew I. In 2016, she welcomed a visit from Ieronymos II, Archbishop of Athens and All Greece.
