= Souroti =

Souroti Σουρωτή
- Community
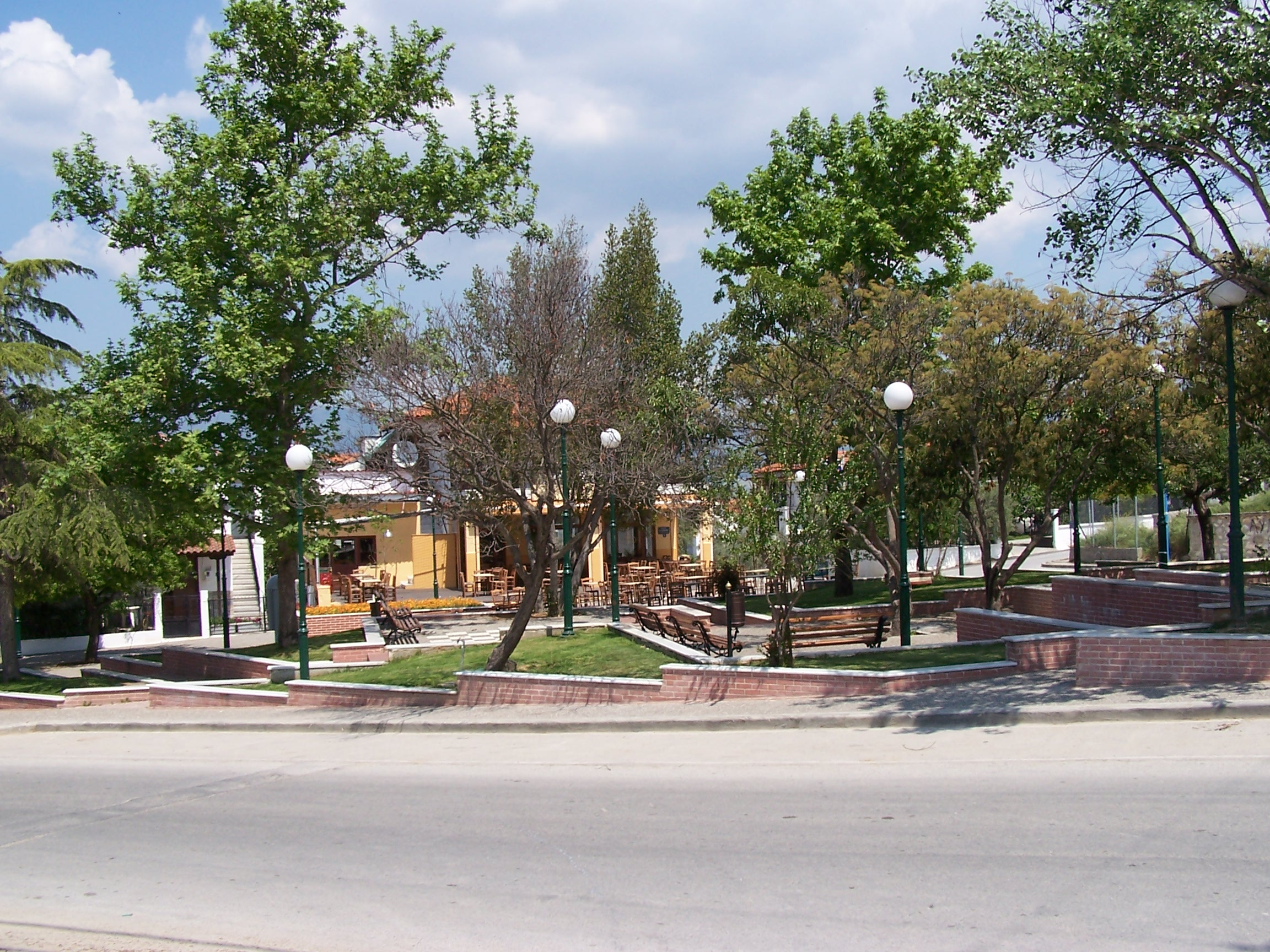
- Central square of Souroti

- Location within Greece
- Coordinates: 40°28′N 23°04′E
- Country: Greece
- Administrative region: Central Macedonia
- Regional unit: Thessaloniki
- Municipality: Thermi
- Municipal unit: Vasilika
- Elevation: 120 m (390 ft)

Population (2021)
  - Community: 1,583
- Time zone: UTC+2 (EET)
  - Summer (DST): UTC+3 (EEST)
- Postal code: 570 06
- Area code: 23960
- Vehicle registration: N

Souroti (Greek: Σουρωτή) is a rural village in the Thessaloniki regional unit of Greece, located 25 kilometers (16 mi) outside of the city of Thessaloniki. In Greece the village is particularly known for the mineral water bottled there. Administratively it belongs to the municipality of Thermi. The Monastery of Saint John the Theologian is situated there, associated with the name of a famous Eastern Orthodox Saint of the 20th century, St. Paisios of Mount Athos.

== History ==
Souroti is an immigrant's village, one of the many that were established in Greek Macedonia after the Balkan Wars and the population exchange between Greece and Turkey. Shortly before 1912 the area was called "Surukli" (from the Turkish suru which means herd) and was owned by five Turkish land owners (Τσιφλικάδες) who sold their land to Jews from Thessaloniki.

The first Greeks that settled in the area were a vlach family from Vlatsi (after 1927 Vlasti) of the Kozani regional unit, the Christos Lolas' family. Although they were originally shepherds, the family sold their sheep to buy the land from the Jews. In October 1913, 40 families consisting of Arvanites from Mandritsa (Μανδρίτσα) settled in the village, following a Bulgarian invasion in their home village. Their primary occupation was sericulture and they moved to Souroti to take advantage of the local mulberries. At the same time they maintained trade bonds with Jewish silk producers in Thrace.

In 1922, after the population exchange between Greece and Turkey about 48 families arrived from Asia Minor originating from İzmir (Σμύρνη), Aydın (Αϊδίνιο), Cius (Κίος), Mudanya (Μουδανιά) and also from Eastern Thrace. Those were educated and they carried their own traditions. In Souroti they worked in sericulture, olive oil production and vine dressing. Between 1928 and 1930 more vlach shepherds came from Vlasti along with 4-5 families of Sarakatsanoi (Σαρακατσάνοι). Land was distributed to the immigrants by the Greek state first in 1914 and later in 1932.

=== Modern establishment ===
The community of Souroti was officially established and recognized by the Greek state on Sep. 20th, 1947. Since then the village, whose main productive activities were agriculture and bottling of mineral water, has undergone steady development. In 1997 during a major reorganization of local self-government initiated by the Greek government called "Kapodistrias plan", Souroti merged with the municipality of Vasilika along with Ag. Paraskeyi, Ag. Antonio, Libadi, Monopigado and Peristera. In 2011 with the Kallikratis plan, Vasilika merged with the municipality of Thermi. Nowadays people from the nearby Thessaloniki are moving to the area around the village which is expected to turn into a suburb of Thessaloniki.

== Discovery of the mineral water spring ==
While still part of the Ottoman Empire, the area around today's bottling factory was a swamp, and the spring of mineral water unknown. During the 1915 military campaigns of the First World War, the French troops that camped at the then called Surukli mapped the spring and built a rudimentary bottling facility. In 1917 Serbian troops camped there and they too built a new bottling facility. They called the water "Sour Water" (Serbian Latin: Kisela Voda, Greek: Ξινό νερό). The Lolas family appropriated and refurbished the facility in 1918. In 1925 George Chonaios took over the Lola's enterprise. Chonaios had the facility work as a private enterprise, however he allotted 5% of the profit to the local community. In 1998 the company went public. Since then it exhibited rapid development and became one of the most popular mineral water brands in Greece.

=== Quality of the mineral water ===
Souroti water has been recognized as a sub-acidic sparkling mineral water rich in calcium and magnesium in accordance with Greek Legislation (Government Gazette 600/1-8-1991, Decision No. 4). It is also included in the European Union's List of Natural Mineral Waters recognised by Member States. The water, at least in the beginning of the 20th century, was naturally sparkling. Although it still preserves its original mineral composition, nowadays carbon dioxide is added during bottling.

The water is estimated to come from a container approximately 150 m underground. It owes its excellent quality to the rock formations at Mount Anthemounta which consist of semi-metamorphic, metamorphic and igneous rocks. Water flowing in the substrate is slow-moving and as it passes through the various rocks it is filtered and enriched with beneficial elements giving it its unique mineral composition and distinctive taste. Water in the spring is cold at a steady temperature of around 16 °C. Its special features are a high magnesium content with the ideal calcium to magnesium ratio and a low sodium and nitrate content. It also contains potassium and fluorine as well as valuable trace elements such as iron, copper, manganese, lithium, selenium, chromium and zinc. It has exceptional taste and is very pleasant to drink, assists in the functioning of the digestive and urinary systems and it has several other health benefits. One liter of Souroti water meets 1/4 of the body's daily needs in calcium and magnesium. All this makes it different from soda water, which is ordinary potable water to which sodium bicarbonate has been added so that it acquires approximately the same properties as natural mineral water.

== Notes ==
- Μαραβελάκη, Μ.; Α. Βακαλόπουλου (1993). Οι προσφυγικές εγκαταστάσεις στην περιοχή Θεσσαλονίκης (in Greek). Θεσσαλονίκη: Ανατύπωση Εκδόσεις Βάνιας.
