= Yahyalı =

- District and municipality
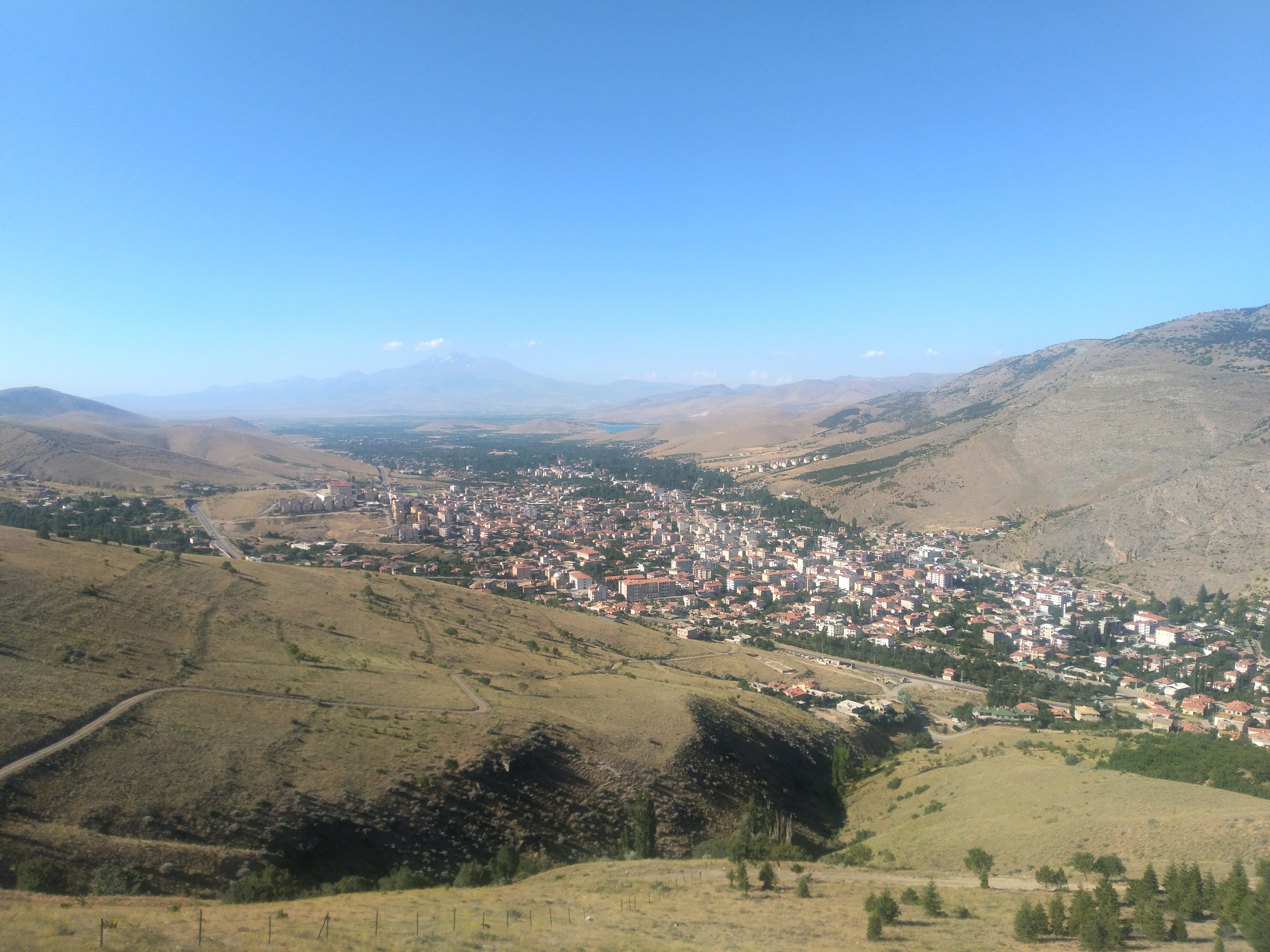

- Map showing Yahyalı District in Kayseri Province

- Location within Turkey Location within Turkey Central Anatolia
- Coordinates: 38°6′0″N 35°21′39″E
- Country: Turkey
- Province: Kayseri

Government
  - Mayor: Esat Öztürk (AKP)
- Area: 1,587 km^{2} (613 sq mi)
- Elevation: 1,330 m (4,360 ft)
- Population (2022): 35,481
  - Density: 22.36/km^{2} (57.91/sq mi)
- Time zone: UTC+3 (TRT)
- Postal code: 38500
- Area code: 0352
- Website: www.yahyali.bel.tr

Yahyalı is a municipality and district of Kayseri Province, Turkey. Its area is 1,587 km^{2} (613 sq mi), and its population is 35,481 (2022). It is the southernmost district of the province. The Aladağlar Mountains, a part of the rocky Taurus Mountains, cover the southern part of the district. The river Zamantı passes through it.

Mostly covered in forest, the Aladağlar National Park covers 300 km^{2} (120 sq mi) and extends into the neighbouring districts of Çamardı (Niğde Province) and Aladağ (Adana Province), although the main part is in Yahyalı.

The nearest airport is Kayseri International Airport.

== History ==
The district was established by Turkish forces led by Seyyid Ali and Yahya Ali (Yahya Gazi who came into Anatolia in the 13th century. The tomb of Seyyid Ali is in the garden of Yahyalı State Hospital while that of Yahya Gazi is in the courtyard of the Yahyalı Grand Mosque (Turkish: Ulu Cami). Yahyalı was affiliated to Kozan until 1926 but became part of Kayseri province after Kozan province became a district in 1926.

== Composition ==
There are 41 neighbourhoods in Yahyalı District:

- 100.Yıl
- 75.Yıl
- Ağcaşar
- Avlağa
- Balcıçakırı
- Burhaniye
- Büyükçakır
- Camikebir
- Çamlıca
- Çavdaruşağı
- Çiğilli
- Çubukharmanı
- Çubuklu
- Delialiuşağı
- Denizovası
- Derebağı
- Dikme
- Fetullah
- Fevzi Çakmak
- Gazibeyli
- İlyaslı
- İsmet
- Kapuzbaşı
- Karaköy
- Kavacık
- Kirazlı
- Kocahacılı
- Kopçu
- Kuzoluk
- Madazı
- Mustafabeyli
- Sazak
- Senirköy
- Seydili
- Süleymanfakılı
- Taşhan
- Ulupınar
- Yenice
- Yerköy
- Yeşilköy
- Yuları

== Yahyalı Carpets ==
The district of Yahyalı is well known for the hand-woven rugs that used to be produced there. These are characterised by their deep red and blue colours and by the medallions usually placed in the centre. Right through into the early 2000s a carpet market clung to life in Yahyalı town.

== Çamlıca ==
Çamlıca was a Greek village of the Yahyalı district also known as Pharasa (Φάρασα), Varasos (Βαρασός), Farasa, Faraşa, or Camlica. Until the Greek-Turkish population exchange of 1923, Notable people from Pharasa included Paisius II of Caesarea, Arsenios the Cappadocian, and Paisios of Mount Athos.
