= Dikme, Kayseri =

Dikme
- Neighbourhood
- Location in Turkey Dikme (Turkey Central Anatolia)
- Coordinates: 38°0′49″N 35°31′54″E
- Country: Turkey
- Province: Kayseri
- District: Yahyalı
- Population (2022): 252
- Time zone: UTC+3 (TRT)
- Postal code: 38500

Dikme is a neighbourhood of the municipality and district of Yahyalı, Kayseri Province, Turkey. Its population is 252 (2022). It has a warm-summer Mediterranean climate (Köppen Csb).
