= Arsenios the Cappadocian =

Greek monk (1840-1924)

Saint Arsenios the Cappadocian
- Ὅσιος Ἀρσένιος ὁ Καππαδόκης
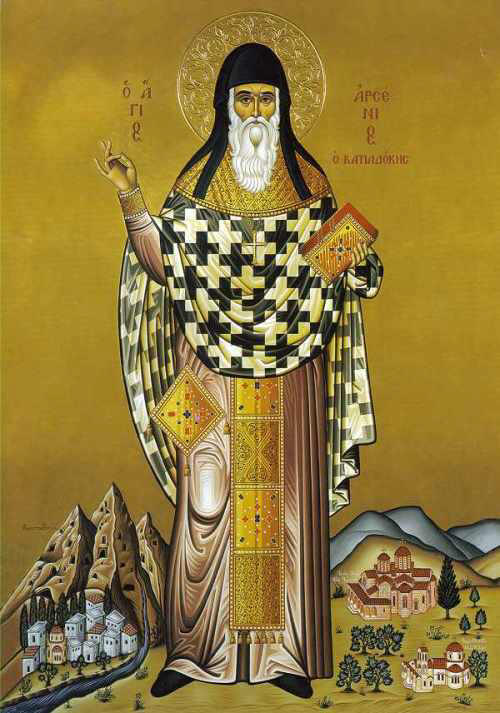

Personal details
- Born: 1840 Pharasa, Cappadocia, Ottoman Empire (modern-day Çamlıca, Yahyalı, Kayseri, Turkey)
- Died: 10 November 1924 (aged 84) Kerkyra, Greece

Sainthood
- Feast day: November 10 (ns) / October 28 (os)
- Canonized: 1986

Saint Arsenios the Cappadocian (Greek: Ὅσιος Ἀρσένιος ὁ Καππαδόκης; 1840 – November 10, 1924), born in Kephalochori, Cappadocia (Greek: Κεφαλοχώρι) was a Greek dean and the spiritual father of Paisios of Mount Athos.

== Life ==
Arsenios's birth name was Theodorus Annitsalichos (Greek: Θεόδωρος Αννητσαλήχος). He was born in Kephalochori, one of the six Christian villages of the region of Pharasa in Cappadocia and an early center of Eastern Orthodox Christianity. His father was a teacher. Both parents died when he was very young, and he and his brother were raised by a maternal aunt. He was sent to be educated in Niğde, where he stayed with a paternal aunt who was a teacher. She, in turn, arranged for him to stay with relatives in Smyrna, while he continued his education. Besides Greek and Church Studies, he learned Armenian, Turkish and some French.

When he was about 26 years old he went to the monastery of the Holy Forerunner of Phlavianai in Caesarea. Later he was tonsured a monk and took the name Arsenios. Metropolitan Paisios II sent him to Pharasa and the neighbouring villages as a priest, while he was also secretly teaching the Greek language to the children of the region, at that time belonging to the Ottoman Empire. In 1870, when he was thirty years old, he was consecrated an archimandrite.

After ordination, he went on a pilgrimage to the Holy Land. Upon his return to Pharasa, the villagers called him Hadjiephentis. He was the respected spiritual guide of the villagers and helped the people a lot together with the mayor of Pharasa, at that time the father of Paisios of Mount Athos. He was claimed to have healed sick people who came to him, Christians and Muslims. He gave Paisios his own name at baptism despite the parents' wish to name the child after a grandfather. Later he became the spiritual father of Paisios of Mount Athos.

After leading his parish to Corfu at the time of the population exchange between Greece and Turkey, he died after three months.

Both Arsenios and Paisios were recognised by the Ecumenical Patriarchate as Orthodox saints, Arsenios by the Ecumenical Patriarch Demetrios I of Constantinople in 1986 and Paisios by the Ecumenical Patriarch Bartholomew I of Constantinople in 2015.

The relics of Saint Arsenios may also be venerated at the Greek Orthodox Church of Prophet Elias in Frankfurt, Germany.

== Works by and about Arsenios ==
- A collection of Psalms as has been given by the Saint ordered after the type of their specific use (Greek)
- «Λόγοι και Νουθεσίες», Κελεκίδης, Λ., Ιερά Μητρόπολις Ξάνθης/Μαΐστρος, 2015. (Teachings of the Saint brought to Greece as a manuscript written in the books of the mother church in Pharasa. Translated from the Cappadocian Greek into Standard Modern Greek and published.
- Γέροντος Παϊσίου (Εζνεπίδη), «Ο Πατήρ Αρσένιος ο Καππαδόκης», εκδ. Ι. Ησυχαστηρίου «ΕΥΑΓΓΕΛΙΣΤΗΣ ΙΩΑΝΝΗΣ Ο ΘΕΟΛΟΓΟΣ», Σουρωτή, 1979.
- Elder Paisios of Mount Athos (2021). Saint Arsenios the Cappadocian (5 ed.). Souroti, Thessaloniki, Greece: Holy Monastery "Evangelist John the Theologian".
