= Pantokratoros Monastery =

Eastern Orthodox monastery, Mount Athos

Pantokratoros
- Παντοκράτορος
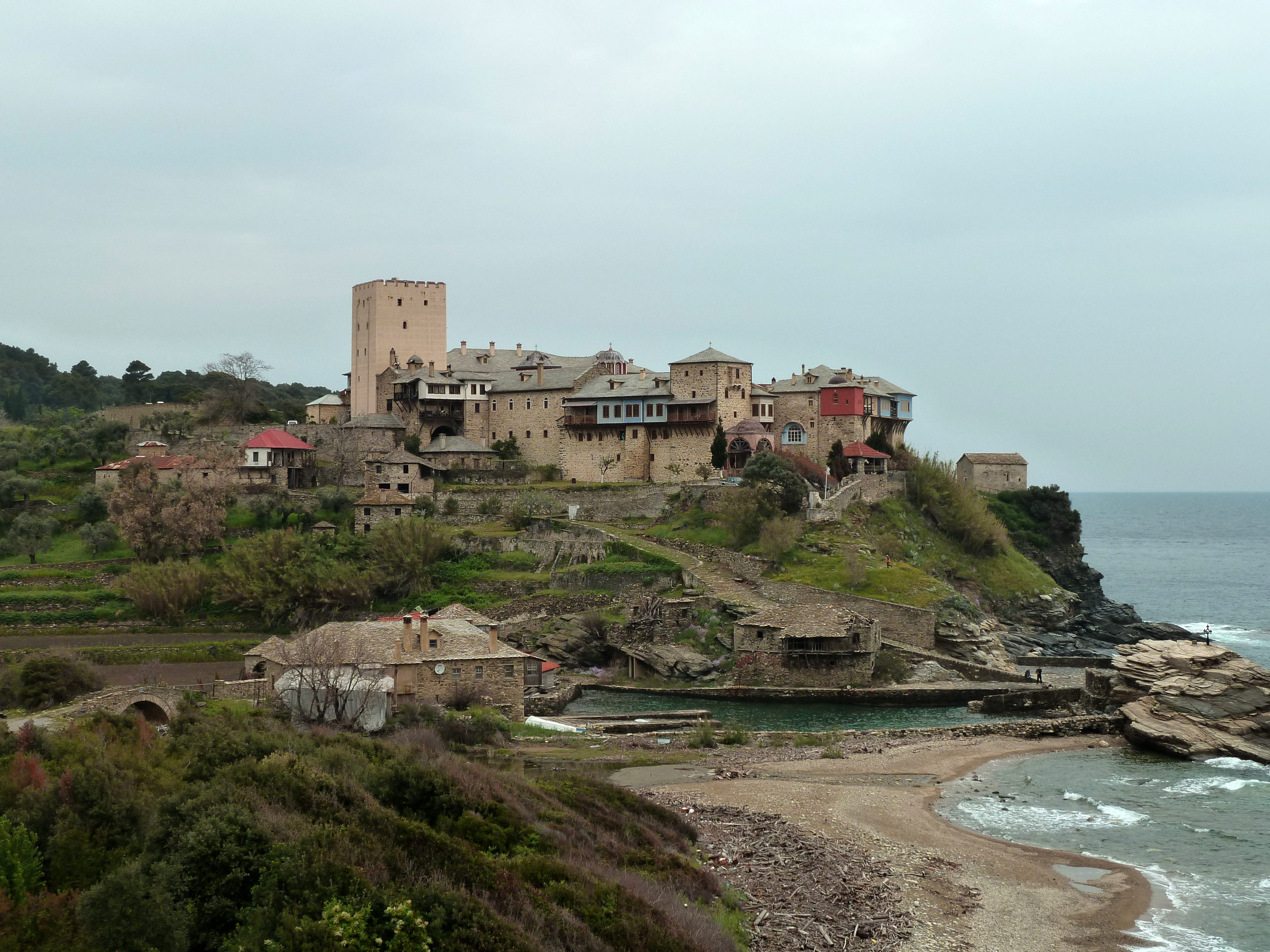
- External view of the monastery.

- Location within Mount Athos
- Interactive map of Pantokratoros

Monastery information
- Full name: Holy Monastery of Pantokratoros
- Order: Ecumenical Patriarchate
- Dedication: Transfiguration of Our Lord
- Diocese: Mount Athos

People
- Founders: Alexios and John
- Prior: Archimandrite Elder Gabriel

Site
- Location: Monastic community of Mount Athos
- Coordinates: 40°17′00.86″N 24°15′59.58″E
- Public access: Men only

Pantokratoros Monastery (Greek: Μονή Παντοκράτορος) is a Greek Orthodox monastery in the monastic state of Mount Athos in Greece. It stands on the north-eastern side of the Athos peninsula, and is dedicated to the Transfiguration of Our Lord. The monastery ranks seventh in the hierarchy of the Athonite monasteries.

== History ==
It was founded around 1360 by the megas stratopedarches Alexios and the megas primikerios John after an imperial chrysobull was granted to them by John V Palaiologos in March 1357. By the end of the 15th century, the Russian pilgrim Isaiah confirms that the monastery was Greek.

In the 17th century, the monastery was associated with Saint Joseph the New of Partoș, who was tonsured as a monk there before later serving as Metropolitan of Timișoara, Romania.

A notable monk was Benjamin of Lesbos, who was ordained as a monk in the monastery in the late 1770s and went on to become a significant figure in the Modern Greek Enlightenment.

In 1992, Pantokratoros was converted from an idiorrhythmic monastery into a cenobitic one, becoming the final idiorrhythmic monastery to make the change to cenobitism. Thirteen fathers from the Athonite monastery of Xenophontos were permitted to move in, and priestmonk Vissarion was elected as abbot. He died shortly after resigning the abbacy in 2001, and priestmonk Gabriel was elected to succeed him. Today the monastery has about 30 monks.

== Manuscripts ==
The library houses c. 350 manuscripts, notably Uncial 051, and 3,500 printed books. The monastery's documents are written in Greek and Turkish.

== Sites ==
Pantokratoros Bridge (Greek: Γεφύρι στη Μονή Παντοκράτορος) is a historical bridge located at a stream behind the main monastery.
