= Idiorrhythmic monasticism =

Form of Christian monastic life

Idiorrhythmic monasticism is the original form of monastic life in Christianity, as exemplified by St. Anthony of Egypt (c. 250–355). It is the opposite of cenobitic monasticism in that instead of communal ownership, the monk lives alone, often in isolation. It consists of a hermit's total withdrawal from society, usually in the desert, and the constant practice of mental prayer. The word idiorrhythmic comes from two Greek words, idios for "particular" and rhythmos for "rule", so the word can be translated as meaning "following one's own devices". It is primarily practiced in Orthodox Christianity.

== See also ==
- Hermitage
- Monastic cell
- Lavra
- Monasticism
- Order (religious)
- Skete
