= Footpaths of Mount Athos =

Mount Athos has an extensive network of footpaths, many of which date back to the Byzantine period. These paths are typically trails designed for human foot traffic and mules, and are not wide enough for motor vehicles. They connect the various monasteries, sketes, cells, kathismas, and hermitages on the peninsula to each other.

== History ==
Many of the footpaths of Mount Athos date back to the Byzantine period. Some are cobblestone paths (kalderimi), while most are dirt trails (monopatia).

Starting in the 1960s, many of the footpaths began to fall into disrepair. However, in the 21st century, the Friends of Mount Athos and other volunteers have been restoring and maintaining the footpaths for pilgrims and monks to use. Today, most of the footpaths are signed, well maintained, and in good condition. The Friends of Mount Athos footpath group also maps out GPX files for the footpaths and monitors their conditions.

== Eastern coast ==
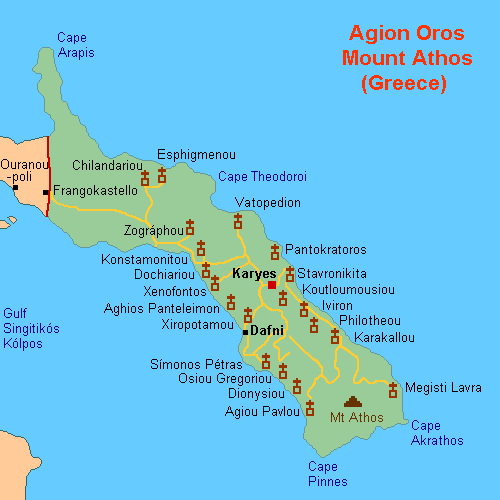
Map of Mount Athos

From north to south in order, the footpath network on the eastern coast of the Athonite peninsula takes pilgrims through the following sites.

- Helandariou Monastery (interior)
- Esphigmenou Monastery
- Vatopedi Monastery
  - Agiou Dimitriou Skete (interior, behind Vatopedi)
  - Bogoroditsa Skete (interior, behind Pantokratoros)
- Pantokratoros Monastery
  - Skete of Prophet Elijah (interior, behind Pantokratoros)
- Stavronikita Monastery
  - Kapsala (interior, behind Stavronikita)
- Koutloumousiou Monastery (interior, behind Karyes)
  - Skete of Saint Andrew (interior, behind Karyes)
  - Skete of Saint Panteleimon (interior, behind Koutloumousiou)
- Iviron Monastery
  - Skete of Timiou Prodromou Iviron (behind Iviron)
- Mylopotamos
- Filotheou Monastery (interior)
- Karakalou Monastery (interior)
- Provata (interior)
- Morfonou (port with ferry service)
- Lakkoskiti (interior, behind Morfonou)
- Great Lavra Monastery

== Western coast ==
From north to south in order, the footpath network on the western coast of the Athonite peninsula takes pilgrims through the following sites. The western coast is steeper and more rugged than the eastern coast.

- Zografou Monastery (interior)
- Konstamonitou Monastery (interior)
- Docheiariou Monastery
- Xenophontos Monastery
- Evangelismou tis Theotokou
- Agiou Panteleimonos Monastery
- Xeropotamou Monastery
- Dafni (port with ferry service)
- Simonos Petras Monastery
- Osiou Grigoriou Monastery
- Dionysiou Monastery
- Agiou Pavlou Monastery
- New Skete
- Skete of Saint Anne
- Vouleftiria
- Little St. Anne's Skete
- Karoulia (port with ferry service)
- Katounakia

== Southern coast ==
The rugged southern coast, which forms the southern slope of the main summit of Mount Athos, is also known as the Desert of Mount Athos, a reference to the Scetis Desert where Christian monasticism had originated. Hesychast hermits have traditionally lived in this area.

From east to west in order, the footpath network takes pilgrims through:

- Great Lavra Monastery
- Prodromos
- Vigla
- Chairi (Χαΐρι) Pass; the Cave of Peter the Athonite is located in the Chairi area
- Megali Sara (Μεγάλη Σάρα; a scree, or hillside covered by rocks)
- Agios Nilos
- Agias Triados Skete (Kafsokalyvia, which has a port with ferry service)
- Kerasia (interior)
- Skete of St. Basil (interior)
- Katounakia
- Karoulia (port with ferry service)

== Way of the Bey ==
The Way of the Bey (Greek: Μονοπάτι της Κορυφογραμμής or Δρόμος του Μπέη) primarily runs along the Athos peninsular ridge. It starts from Esphigmenou Monastery, reaches its highest point at the peak of Antiathonas (1042 m), and ends at Dionysiou Monastery.

== See also ==
- Camino de Santiago
- Monastic community of Mount Athos

== Bibliography ==
- Howorth, Peter (2022). Mount Athos: The Holy Mountain. Filathonites. ISBN 978-0-473-41386-6. (a detailed multilingual map of Mount Athos in English, Greek, and Russian; also contains notes in German, French, Italian, Serbian, Bulgarian, and Romanian)
- Thomas, Chris and Howorth, Peter (2022). Encounters on the Holy Mountain. ISBN 978-2-503-58911-4. (stories from Mount Athos)
