= Desert of Mount Athos =

Geographical area in Greece

Coordinates: 40°08′06″N 24°20′06″E

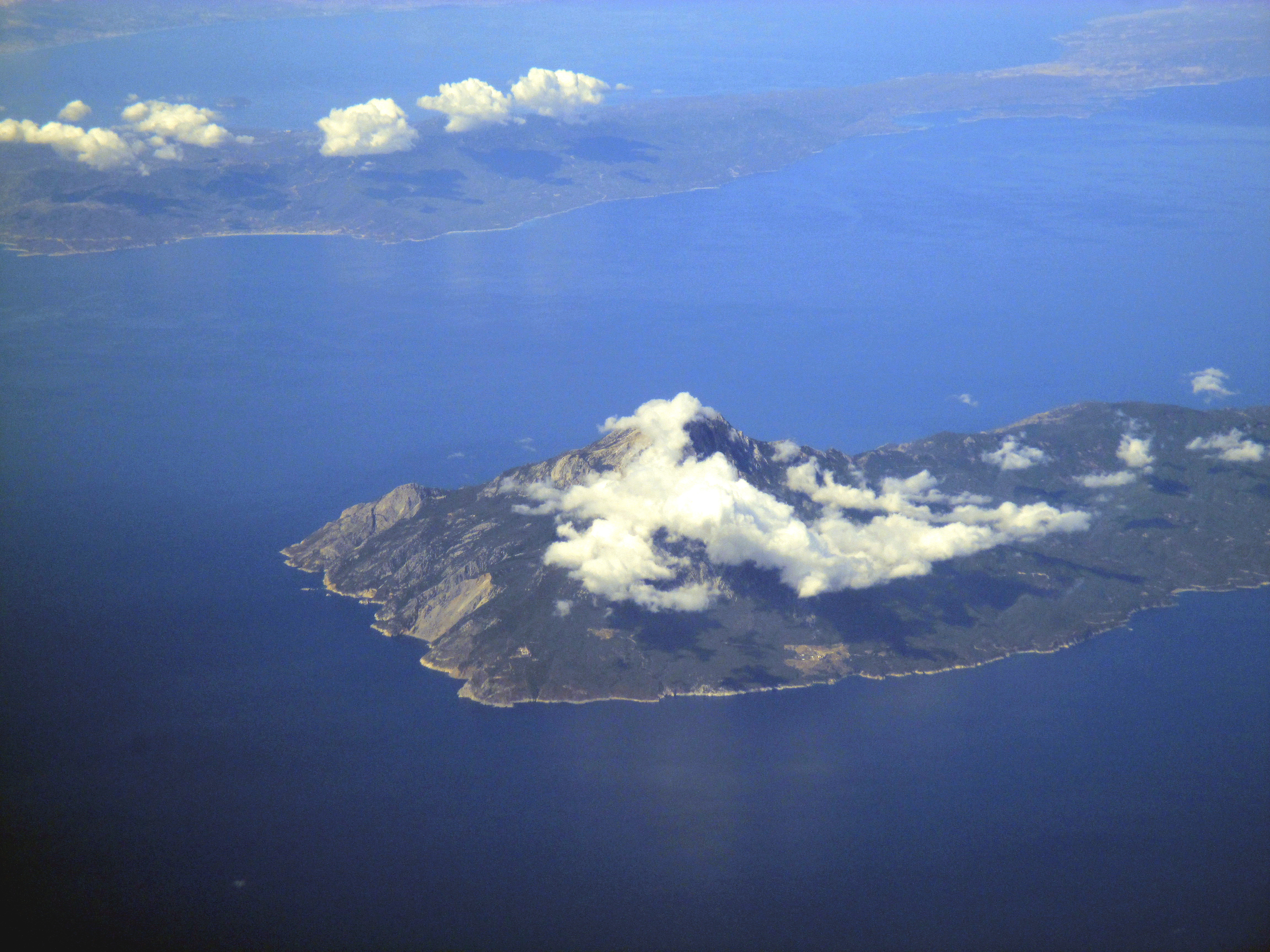
Aerial photograph of the peak of Mount Athos (center). The Desert of Mount Athos is the area to the left (or south) of the summit.

The Desert of Mount Athos or Wilderness of Mount Athos (Greek: Έρημος του Αγίου Όρους, romanized: Eremos tou Agiou Oros) is a geographical area of Mount Athos that corresponds to the southern slopes of Mount Athos. Located along the southernmost coast of the Athos peninsula, it stretches roughly from Katounakia in the west to Vigla in the east. The Desert of Mount Athos has been a center of Christian asceticism and hesychasm for over 1,000 years.

== Environment ==
Although customarily translated as "desert" from the Greek word érēmos (έρημος), the area is not literally a desert biome, since érēmos (έρημος) is more accurately translated as 'wilderness' or 'uncultivated land', and is not necessarily a true desert. Most of the area is covered with sclerophyllous scrub vegetation and mixed broadleaf deciduous and evergreen forests. Unlike the rest of Mount Athos where motor vehicles are regularly used, transportation within the Desert of Mount Athos can only be done by foot or with mules on the various rocky footpaths in the area.

== Settlements ==
From east to west, settlements located within the Desert of Mount Athos include:

- Vigla
- Agios Nilos
- Kafsokalyvia
- Kerasia
- Hermitage of Saint Basil
- Katounakia
- Karoulia

There are various monastic cells scattered across the Desert of Mount Athos that are primarily inhabited by Greek, Russian, Serbian, and Romanian hermits.

The peak of Karmilio Oros (887 m, located near the Hermitage of Saint Basil) is also located within the Desert of Mount Athos.

== See also ==
- Desert Fathers
- Nitrian Desert
- Scetis
- Footpaths of Mount Athos § Southern coast
