= Lacu =

Lacu may refer to:

- Lacu (Mount Athos), or Lakkoskiti, a Romanian skete on Mount Athos
- Lacu, a village in Odăile Commune, Buzău County, Romania
- Lacu, a village in Geaca Commune, Cluj County, Romania
- Lacu, the former drummer of Hanoi Rocks
