= Karl Gustav von Strandmann =

Russian German military officer (1786–1855)

- Карл Густавович Штрандман
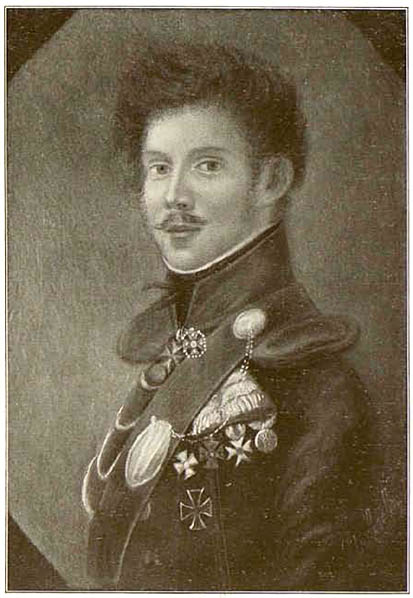
- Karl Gustav von Strandmann
- Born: 1786 or 17 March 1787; Governorate of Livonia, Russian Empire
- Died: 27 March 1855; Slonim, Russian Empire
- Relatives: Gustav Ernst von Strandmann (father); Nikolai Karlovich Strandtman (son)
- Military career
- Allegiance: Russian Empire
- Branch: Imperial Russian Army
- Rank: General of the Cavalry
- Commands: Life Guards Grodno Hussar Regiment; 2nd Brigade, 2nd Light Cavalry Division; 2nd Light Cavalry Division; Guards Reserve Cavalry Corps
- Conflicts: Russo-Turkish War (1806–1812); Patriotic War of 1812; Foreign Campaigns of 1813–1814; November Uprising (1831)
- Awards: Order of Saint George, 4th class (1814); Order of Saint Vladimir, 4th class (1814); Order of Saint George, 3rd class (1831); Order of the White Eagle (1849); Order of Saint Alexander Nevsky

Karl Gustav von Strandmann (Russian: Штрандман, Карл Густавович; 1786–1855) was a Russian German military officer, a General of the Cavalry in the Imperial Russian Army and commander of the Guards Reserve Cavalry Corps.

== Early life and education ==
Born in the Governorate of Livonia to Gustav Ernst von Strandmann, governor-general of Siberia and a general of infantry of the Russian Army, Karl Gustav was enrolled in the Page Corps, the elite military academy in Imperial Russia that prepared sons of the nobility and senior officers for military service. He did not graduate, however, and on 20 October 1803 enlisted as a junker in the Chevalier Guard Regiment, the elite heavy cavalry unit of the Russian Imperial Guard.

== Military career ==
=== Russo-Turkish War (1806–1812) ===
After being commissioned as an ensign on 8 September 1804, Strandmann was transferred to the Pereyaslavl Dragoon Regiment, which was serving in the army then campaigning against the Turks. Over the next eight years he took part in numerous engagements, repeatedly demonstrating personal bravery.

He participated in the capture of Kilia in 1806, the blockade of Izmail in 1807, and the Pereyaslavl Regiment's operations beyond the Danube, including the recapture of Izmail in 1809. He particularly distinguished himself during the capture of the fortress of Turtukai and in the storm of Ruse (Rushchuk) in 1810, for which he was promoted to second lieutenant. In 1811, for further distinctions at the taking of the fortresses of Tulcha, Isakchai, Babadag, Razgrad, and others, he was promoted to lieutenant and entrusted with command of a detachment of Serbian volunteers, with whom he took part in the siege of the fortress of Vidin. In early January 1812, he detected and repulsed a large Ottoman sortie from that fortress, for which he was promoted to staff-captain.

=== Patriotic War of 1812 ===
Strandmann joined the campaign against Napoleon's invasion of Russia in its final stage, as the retreating French army was hastening toward the Berezina. His first engagement with French forces was at the crossing of the Berezina, after which he joined in the pursuit of the retreating enemy. As a reward for his distinguished service he was transferred to the Life Guards Uhlan Regiment.

=== War of the Sixth Coalition (1813–1814) ===
In 1813 Strandmann took part in the blockade of the fortress of Thorn and in the Battle of Bautzen, and subsequently fought at Dresden, Leipzig, and Kulm. He particularly distinguished himself during a cavalry charge of the Life Guards Uhlan Regiment at Kulm, for which he was promoted to Rittmeister (cavalry captain).

In 1814 he took part in nearly all the major engagements with the French, including those at Brienne, Montmirail, Sedan, and Fère-Champenoise. His most celebrated action came at Fère-Champenoise, where, in the presence of Emperor Alexander I, he led his uhlans in several charges against French infantry, capturing six artillery pieces. Crown Prince Charles John of Sweden (the former marshal Jean-Baptiste Bernadotte), who witnessed the charge, remarked to his staff: "In my time I have seen many wonders, but cavalry taking guns from infantry, and French infantry at that, I have never seen." For this feat, Strandmann was awarded the Order of Saint George, 4th class (No. 2877 in the Grigorovich–Stepanov register) on 13 March 1814. He subsequently took part in the capture of Paris, for which he received the Order of Saint Vladimir, 4th class with bow.

=== Post-Napoleonic service and the November Uprising (1830–1831) ===
Following the wars, Strandmann returned to Russia with his regiment. In 1817 he joined the newly formed Life Guards Uhlan Regiment of Tsarevich Konstantin Pavlovich with two squadrons of the old regiment. Promoted to colonel in 1818, he was appointed in 1824 as commander of the Life Guards Grodno Hussar Regiment, which he commanded for more than ten years, receiving promotion to major general and confirmation as regimental commander during this period.

When the November Uprising broke out in Warsaw in 1830, Strandmann immediately led his regiment to the Mokotów field, joining the force of Tsarevich Konstantin Pavlovich. When full-scale military operations began in 1831, the Grodno Hussars under his command took an energetic part in the battles at Grochów, Ostrolenka, and the storm of Warsaw. He especially distinguished himself during the storm of Warsaw, commanding the detachment on the right flank of the Russian army, and was awarded the Order of Saint George, 3rd class (No. 457), with the citation: For outstanding courage and bravery shown on 25 and 26 August 1831 during the storm of the Warsaw fortifications. He also distinguished himself at Racionż, where with the Grodno Hussars he routed and destroyed the 25th Kraków Lancer regiment.

=== Later commands ===
On 10 February 1832 Strandmann was appointed commander of the 2nd Brigade of the 2nd Light Guard Division while retaining command of the Grodno Hussars. On 28 February 1835 he was appointed commander of the 2nd Light Cavalry Division and promoted to lieutenant general that same year, commanding the division for nine years. From 1844 he served with the commander-in-chief of the Guards and Grenadier Corps, Grand Duke Mikhail Pavlovich. Subsequently appointed commander of the Guards Reserve Cavalry Corps, he was promoted to General of the Cavalry and confirmed in the corps command, which he held until his death.

== Family ==
In 1828 Strandmann married Lucja Stoszińska, a Polish Catholic. They had three sons who became generals — Konstantin (1829–1913), Nikolai (1835–1900), and Karl (1838–1891) — and three daughters who served as maids of honour at the Imperial court: Jadwiga (1829–1885), Lucja (1832–1895), and Elena (1834–1910).

His son Nikolai Karlovich Strandtman was a lieutenant general in the Imperial Russian Army. Nikolai Karlovich Strandtman's son, Nikolai Nikolaevich Strandtman, later known as Nikon of Karoulia, was a military officer who later became an Eastern Orthodox monk and starets at Karoulia, Mount Athos.
