= Karmilio Oros =

Mountain in Mount Athos, Greece

- Mount Carmel; Καρμήλιο Όρος
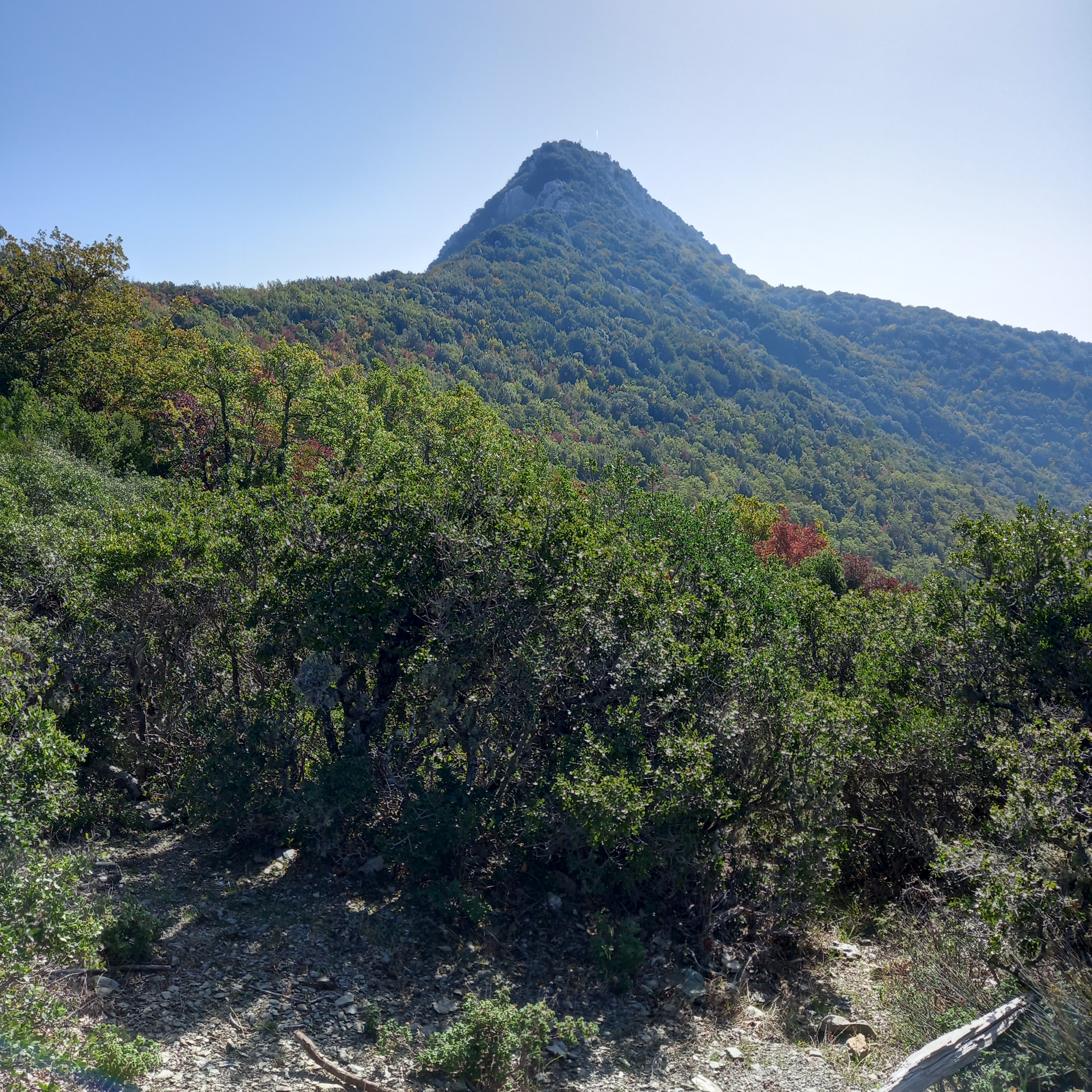
- View of Karmilio Oros as seen along the footpath from Stavros to the Skete of Saint Anne

Highest point
- Elevation: 887 m (2,910 ft)
- Prominence: 887 m (2,910 ft)
- Coordinates: 40.1290864°N 24.3113586°E

Naming
- Etymology: Mount Carmel

Geography
- Location within Greece
- Location: Chalkidiki
- Country: Greece
- Region: Mount Athos

Climbing
- Normal route: From the Skete of St. Basil or Stavros
- Access: Men only

Karmilio Oros (Greek: Καρμήλιο Όρος or Καρμύλιο Όρος; also known as Prophet Elijah or Profitis Ilias (Προφήτης Ηλίας) on some maps) is a peak at the southern end of the Athos peninsula. Its summit is 887 metres above sea level. It is named after Mount Carmel.

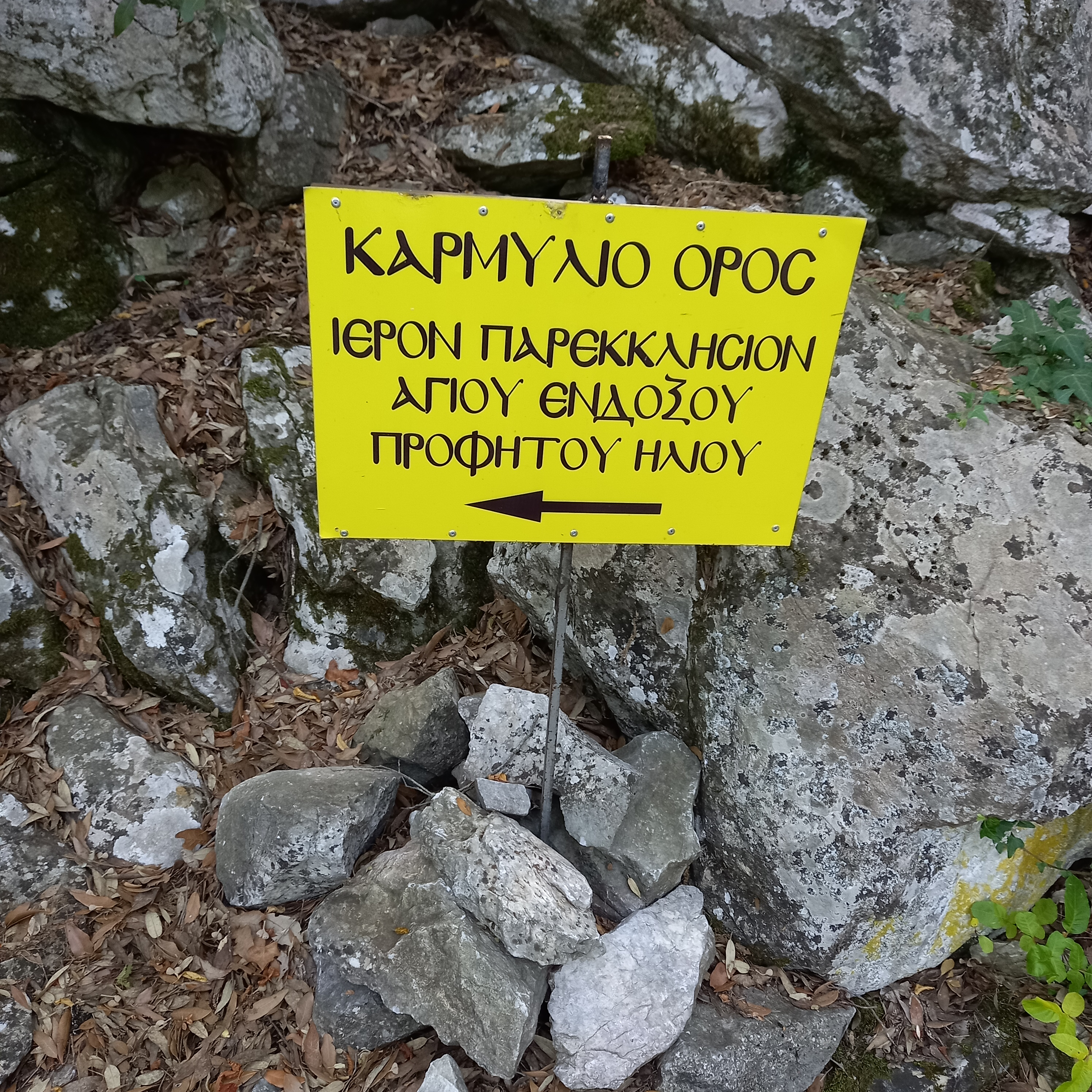
Sign on the footpath between the Hermitage of Saint Basil and Stavros pointing the way to Karmilio Oros

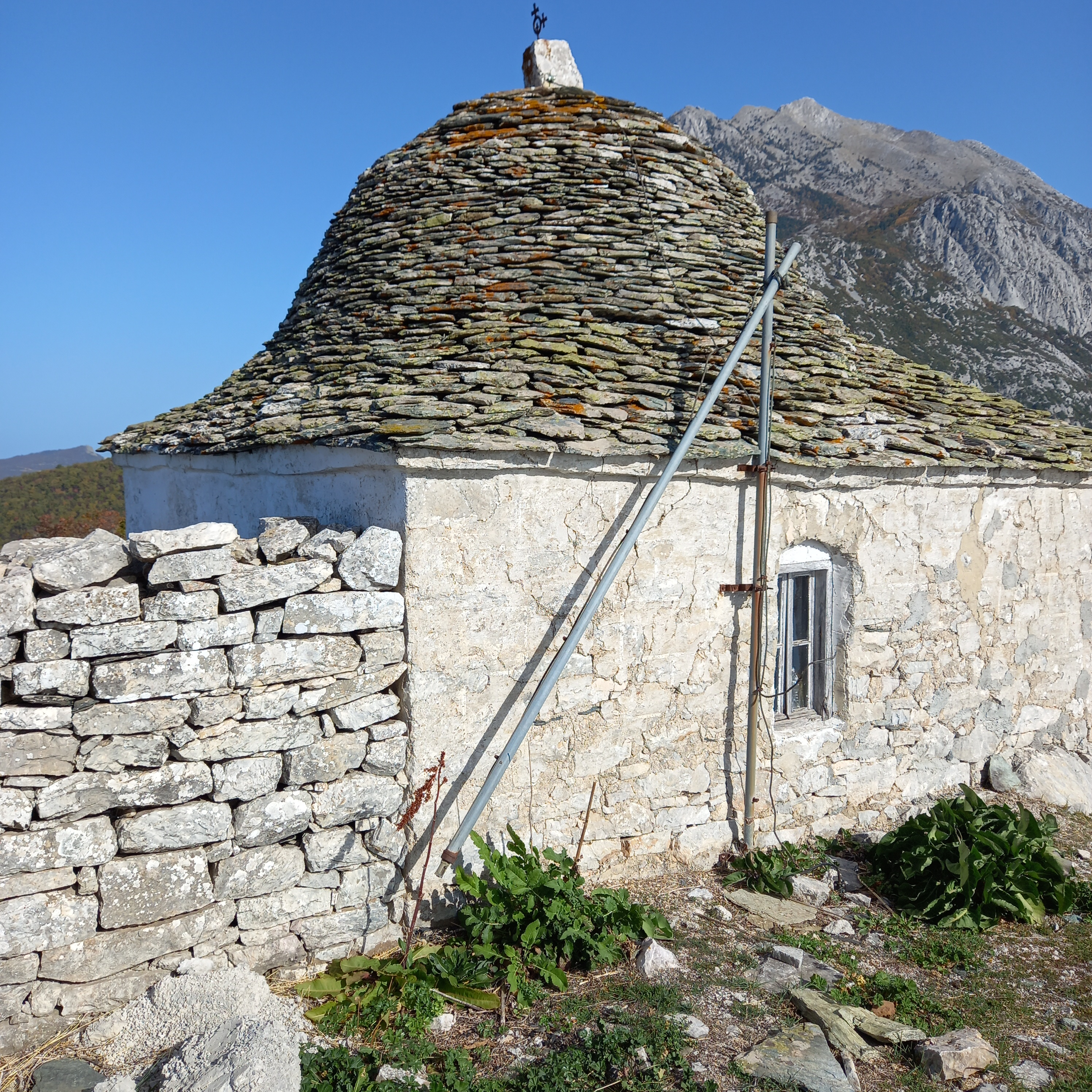
The Holy Chapel of the Holy Glorious Prophet Elijah (Ιερόν Παρεκκλήσιον Αγίου ενδόξου Προφήτου Ηλιού) on Karmilio Oros

The peak can be reached via footpaths from the Hermitage of Saint Basil. The peak lies directly to the northeast of the Skete of St. Basil. The Holy Chapel of the Holy Glorious Prophet Elijah (Ιερόν Παρεκκλήσιον Αγίου ενδόξου Προφήτου Ηλιού; 40.187602°N 24.292176°E) and some radio towers sit on top of the peak. A footpath connects the skete to the peak, as well as with the Stavros junction, where there are footpaths that lead to the Skete of St. Anne, Kerasia, and Great Lavra.

Its summit is also known as the "peak of the Prophet Elijah." One of its historical residents included Saint Gerasimus of Kefalonia (1506–79), who for 17 years lived "a heroic existence, battling constantly against nature’s elements – wind, thunder and lightning, rain, snow, frost – and against the full guile of demons" on Karmilion. Another historical resident included "the Confessor Father Neophytos who lived on Karmelion (a peak west of Kerasia and above the desert of St. Basil)."

== In literature ==
The peak has been mentioned in medieval Byzantine texts, including in the Life of Maximos the Hutburner by Theophanes of Vatopedi, which gives the name of the peak as Karmelion (Καρμήλιον).

After going up two or three times from the Panagia and being granted this experience, he [Maximos the Hutburner] then went down from there and, going to Karmelion, found a solitary elder there and told him about his vision.

— p. 479, Chapter 9, Life of Maximos the Hutburner by Theophanes of Vatopedi
