= Antiathonas =

- Αντιάθωνας
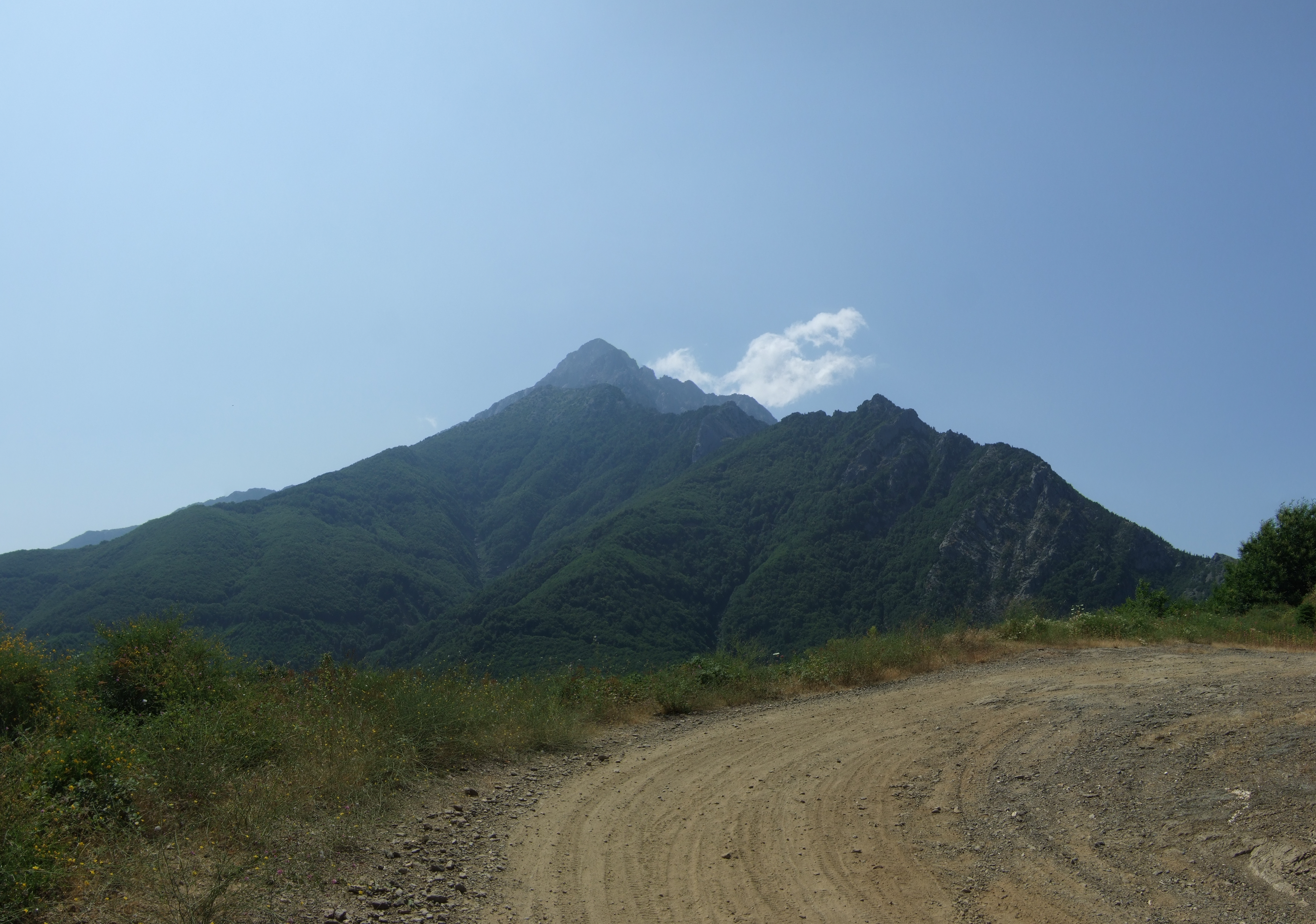

Highest point
- Elevation: 1,042 m (3,419 ft)
- Coordinates: 40.187602°N 24.292176°E

Geography
- Location within Greece
- Location: Chalkidiki
- Country: Greece

Antiathonas (Greek: Αντιάθωνας or Αντι-άθωνας) is a peak in the Athos peninsula. Its summit is 1042 metres above sea level.

The peak can be reached via footpaths from Dionysiou Monastery. It is located a few kilometers northwest of the summit of Mount Athos. Lakkoskiti, a Romanian skete, is located on its eastern slopes.

== Gallery ==
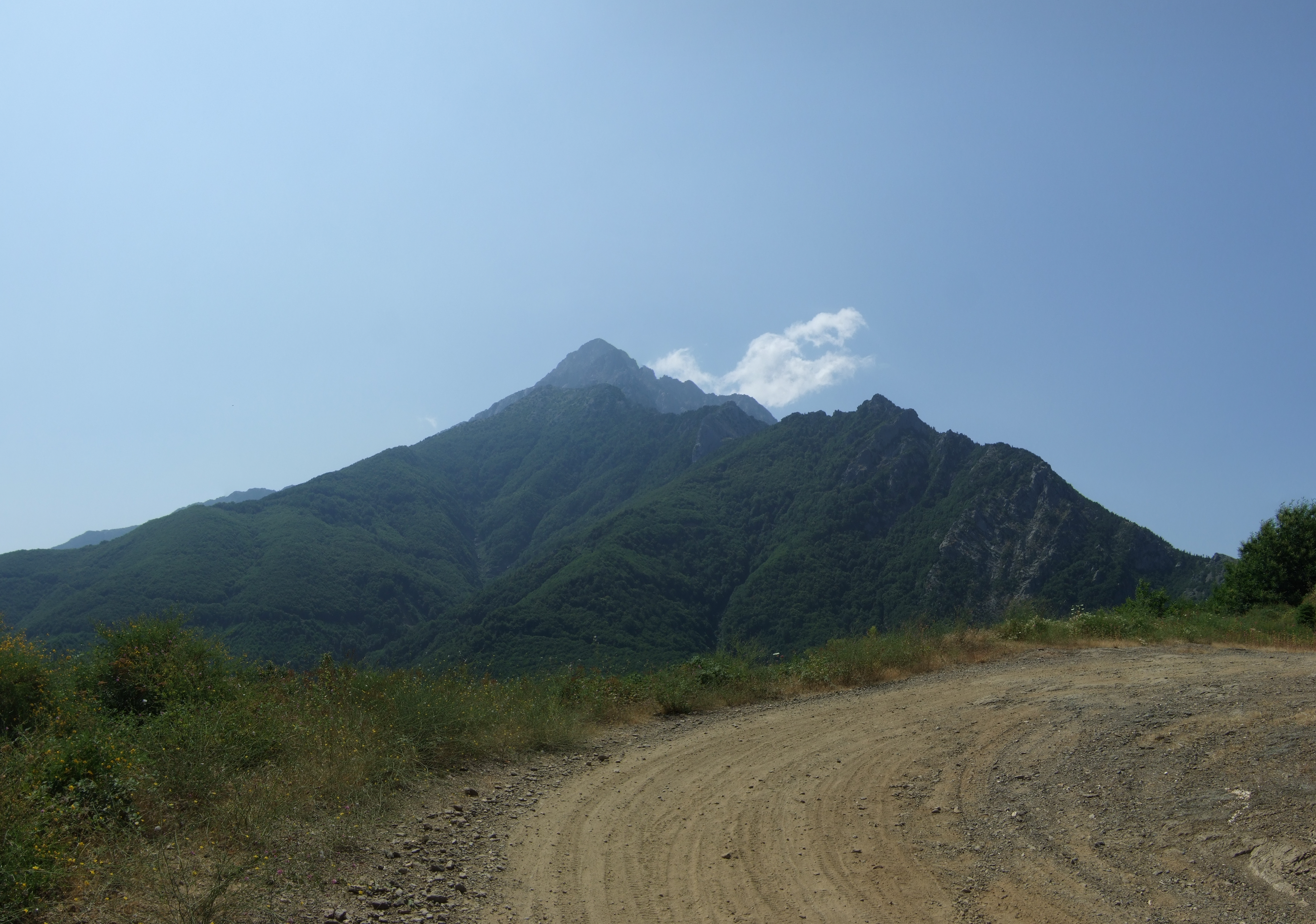
Antianthonas is in the foreground, with the summit of Mount Athos slightly visible in the background.

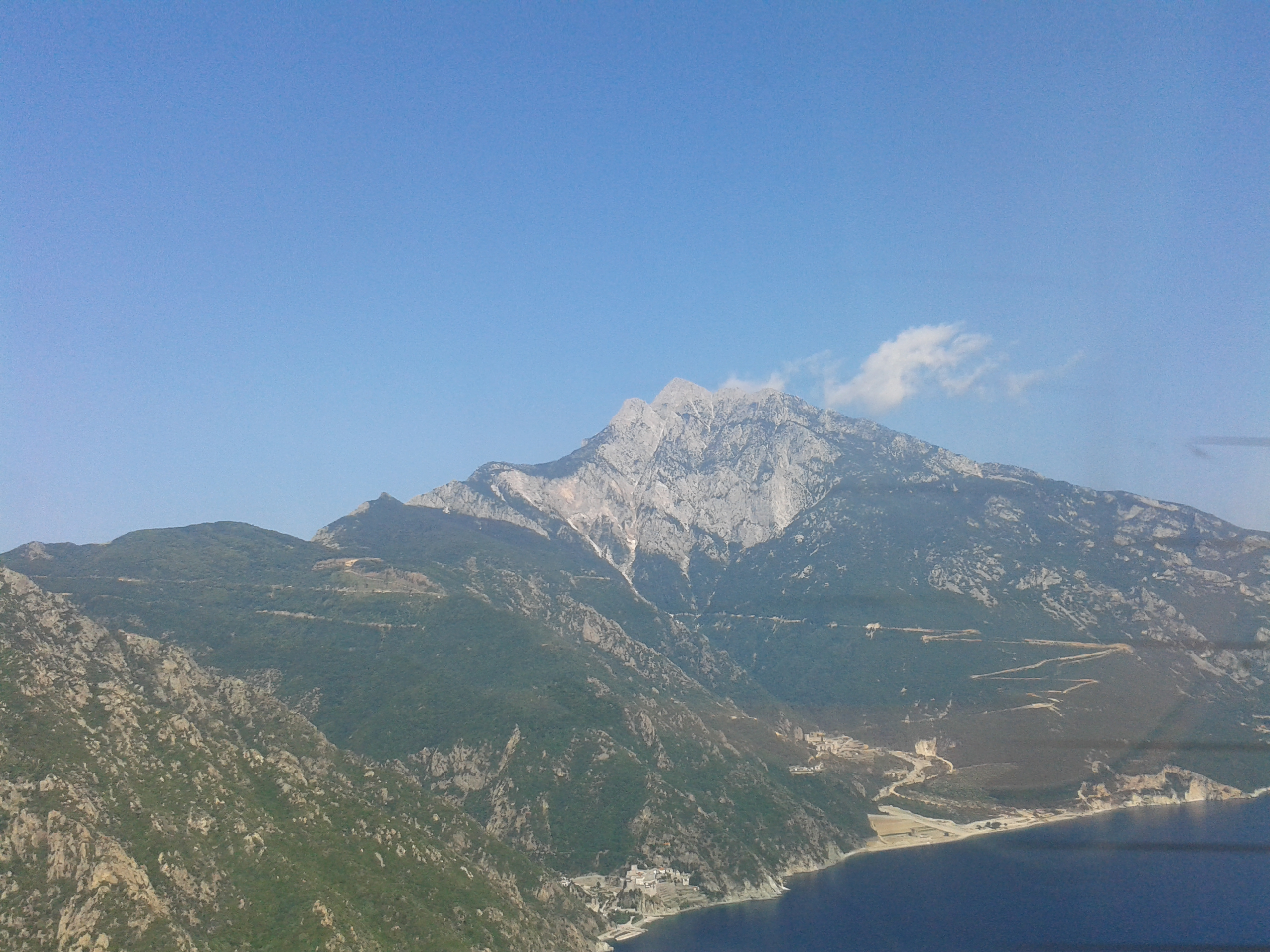
View of Antiathonas from the sea

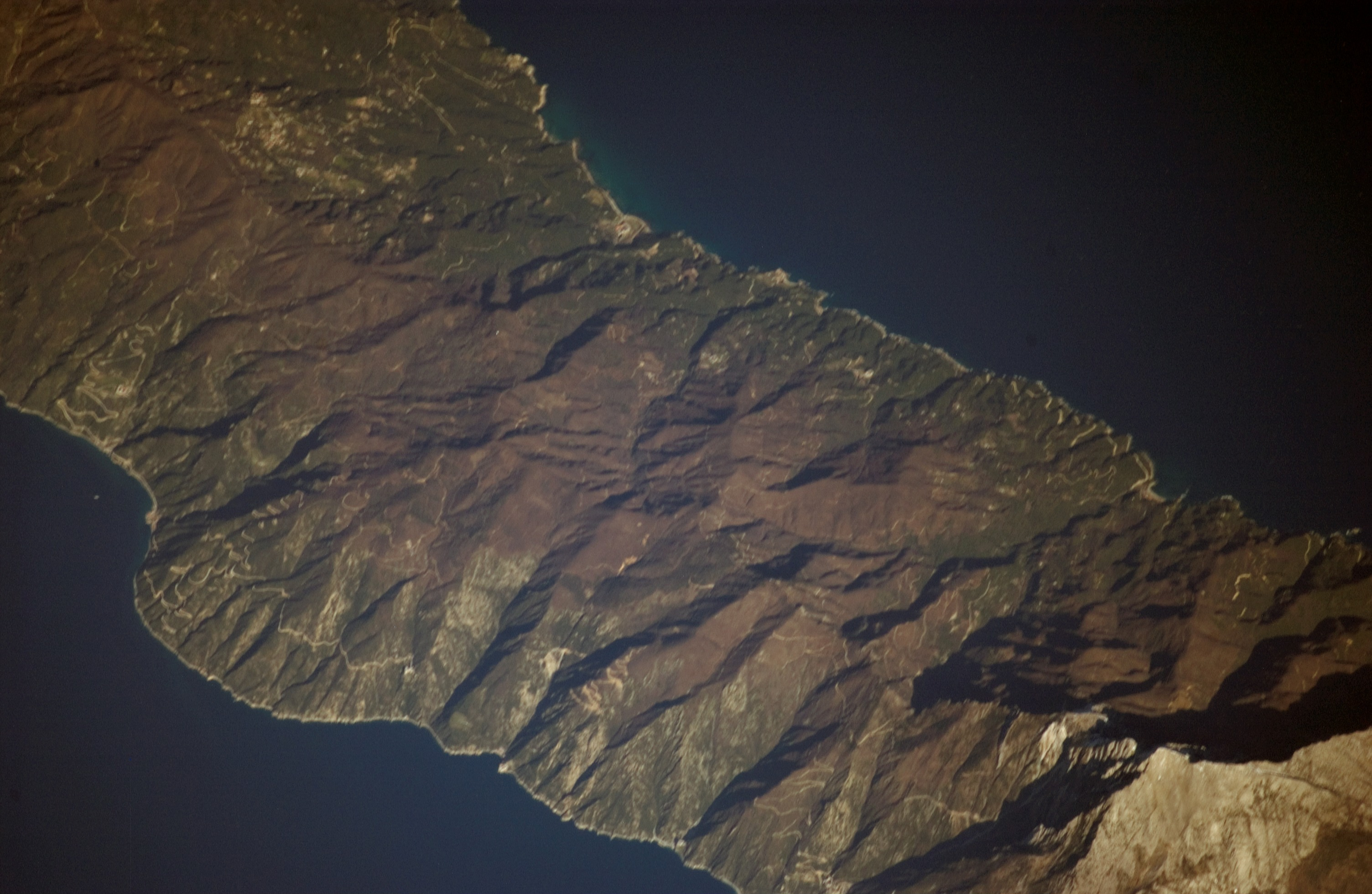
Aerial view of Antiathonas (lower center)
