= Nikon of Karoulia =

Russian military officer and Orthodox monk

Hieromonk Nikon of Karoulia
- Никон Карульский
- Born: Nikolai Nikolaevich Strandtman (Николай Николаевич Штрандман); September 4, 1875; Grodno, Belarus
- Died: September 20, 1963 (aged 88); Karoulia, Mount Athos, Greece
- Parents: Nikolai Karlovich Strandtman (father); Praskovya Vasilievna, née Orzhekhovskaya (mother)
- Relatives: Karl Gustav von Strandmann (paternal grandfather)
- Family: Vasily Nikolaevich Strandtman (brother)

Hieromonk Nikon of Karoulia (also known as Nikon Karulskiy, Russian: Никон Карульский; born Nikolai Nikolaevich (von) Strandtman, Russian: Николай Николаевич Штрандман; also known as Nikon N. Strandtman; 4 September 1875, in Grodno, Belarus – 20 September 1963, in Mount Athos, Greece) was a Russian military officer and Orthodox monk. During his later years, he was known as a hesychast hermit and starets in Karoulia, Mount Athos.

== Early life and military career ==
He was born Nikolai Nikolaevich Strandtman on 4 September 1875 in Grodno, Belarus.

Born into a military family closely associated with the Russian Imperial family, his father was Nikolai Karlovich Strandtman, a lieutenant general in the Imperial Russian Army, and his paternal grandfather was Karl Gustav von Strandmann, who in turn was descended from Gustav Ernst von Strandmann. His brother, Vasily Nikolaevich Strandtman, was a diplomat in Serbia. He was a godson of Tsar Alexander II, and he also served as a page at the time of Tsar Nicholas II's coronation in 1894. From 1901 to 1902, he toured the world with Grand Duke Boris Vladimirovich. Later, he became an adjutant for Boris Vladimirovich.

Strandtman served as a military officer in the Russo-Japanese War and World War I, during which he was a Colonel of the Russian Regiment. For his service, he received various medals and awards from the Imperial Russian Army. He was also a member of the Indian branch of the Theosophical Society in St. Petersburg but later quit, saying that the society had told him that "love was a degradation and that the mind was the highest thing."

== Monastic life ==
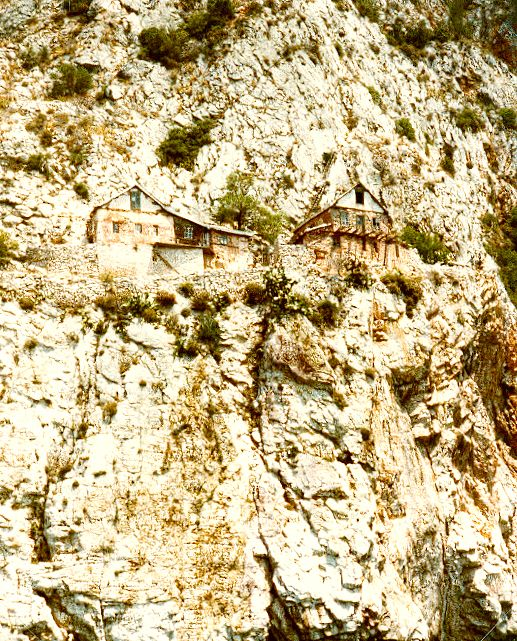
The cliffs of Karoulia, Mount Athos, where Nikon lived as a hermit since 1941

He moved to Mount Athos in 1935 or 1936 and became a hieromonk in the cell of St. John the Chrysostom of Hilandar Monastery at Mount Athos. He was a fluent speaker of Russian, English, French, and German, but was not conversant in Greek during his time at Mount Athos. One of his amateur interests as a monk was astronomy.

In 1941, he moved into a cave in Karoulia, where he practiced hesychasm as an ascetic and became known as Nikon of Karoulia. At the time, there were also six other Russians living in Karoulia.

In May 1948, Gerald Palmer met Nikon personally and wrote an account of him. Since 1950, he visited Nikon about once every year until his death in 1963. Palmer later dedicated his translation of the Philokalia to Father Nikon, stating in the book's dedication that "without [Father Nikon's] inspiration this work would not have been undertaken".

Sydney Loch, a British resident of Ouranoupoli, also wrote accounts of Nikon.

He died at Mount Athos on 20 September 1963 (Old Style date: 7 September 1963).
