= Hermitage of Saint Basil =

Skete on Mount Athos

Skete of St. Basil
- Σκήτη Αγίου Βασιλείου
- Location within Mount Athos
- Interactive map of Skete of St. Basil

Monastery information
- Order: Greek Orthodox

Site
- Location: Mount Athos; Greece
- Coordinates: 40°7′37″N 24°18′29″E
- Public access: Men only

The Hermitage of Agios Vasileios (Greek: Ησυχαστήριο Άγιος Βασίλειος), also sometimes referred to as the Skete of St. Basil (Greek: Σκήτη Αγίου Βασιλείου), is an Orthodox skete on Mount Athos.

The peak of Karmilio Oros (Καρμήλιο Όρος; "Mount Carmel"; elevation: 887 m) lies directly to the northeast of the Skete of St. Basil. The Holy Chapel of the Holy Glorious Prophet Elijah (Ιερόν Παρεκκλήσιον Αγίου ενδόξου Προφήτου Ηλιού) and some radio towers sit on top of the peak. A footpath connects the skete to the peak, as well as with the Stavros junction (elevation: 730 m), where there are footpaths that lead to the Skete of St. Anne, Kerasia, and Great Lavra.

According to local oral tradition, the Skete was originally settled by monks fleeing persecution in Asia Minor, perhaps from the regions of Pontus or Cappadocia, and who named their new settlement after the greatest son and tutelary protector of their homeland: Saint Basil. As evidence for this tradition, the monks point to the architectural style of the central church (kyriakon) of Saint Basil's Skete, which is not built in the typical Byzantine nor Macedonian style, but looks rather like an example of the plain, octagonal, stone-built churches of Cappadocia (e.g.: the Kızıl Kilise in Güzelyurt, Aksaray). To this day, monks of Pontic and 'Mountain (Caucasian) Greek' ancestry reside in the vicinity of St Basil's Skete.

== Notable residents ==
Notable monks who lived at the skete include St. Joseph the Hesychast and his brotherhood, including disciples Arsenios the Cave Dweller and others.

Paisius Velichkovsky was also a resident of the skete.
