= Vouleftiria =

Vouleftiria Βουλευτήρια
- Settlement
- Location within Greece
- Coordinates: 40°08′18.08″N 24°17′29.02″E
- Country: Greece
- Administrative region: Mount Athos
- Time zone: UTC+2 (EET)
  - Summer (DST): UTC+3 (EEST)

Vouleftiria (Greek: Βουλευτήρια) is an area of Mount Athos that belongs to the Monastery of Great Lavra. Located directly downhill from the main area of the Skete of Saint Anne, it is served by the port (arsanas) of Saint Anne (Agia Anna) (Greek: Aρσανάς Αγίας Άννας, romanized: Arsanas Agias Annas). There are several kellia in Vouleftiria.
