= Lakkoskiti =

Monastic community of Mt. Athos

- Σκήτη Αγίου Δημητρίου or Λακκοσκήτη; Schitul Lacu
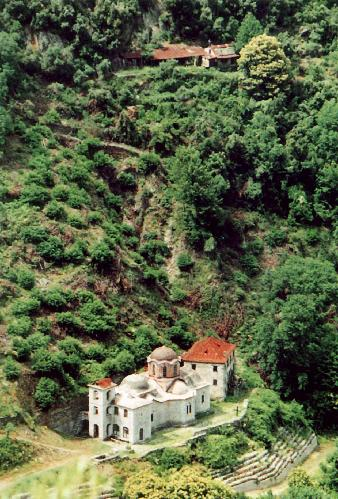
- The Kyriakon of Lakkoskiti, i.e. the church of Saint Dimitrios, and an old cell a little higher, on the forested slope

- Location within Mount Athos
- Interactive map of Lakkoskiti

Monastery information
- Order: Greek Orthodox

Site
- Location: Mount Athos; Greece
- Coordinates: 40°11′34.02″N 24°19′7.70″E
- Public access: Men only

Lakkoskiti (Greek: Σκήτη Αγίου Δημητρίου or Λακκοσκήτη, Romanian: Schitul Lacu) is the short name of a small monastic village of no more than 15 houses consisting of the idiorrhythmic skete of Agiou Dimitriou tou Lakkou. It is situated in the north foothills of Mount Athos, in Greece, in the Morfonou River valley and surrounded by a forest of chestnut trees. The summit of Antiathonas (1042 m) is located southwest of the skete. Lakkoskiti is inhabited by Romanian monks.

Lakkoskiti belongs to Agiou Pavlou (Greek: Αγίου Παύλου, English: Saint Paul) Monastery. Spiritually, through its mother monastery, and like the entire Athos peninsula, it is under the jurisdiction of the Ecumenical Patriarchate of Constantinople.

== History ==
Very little is known about the history of Romanian Lakkoskiti. Monks were living there since the 10th century, belonging to the old Amalfinon Monastery which was soon abandoned and ruined, after the Schism between Eastern Orthodox and Western Roman Catholic Church in 1054 AD. In the 14th century some Serbs borrowed money from Vatopediou Monastery to revive the place but failed to pay it back. So later Vatopediou Monastery, after a deal with Agiou Pavlou Monastery, exchanged the land with other properties. Inscriptions of 1606 AD show that there were Slavs living there while in 1754 the monks are documented as Moldavians (from the Principality of Moldavia, one of the two predecessors of modern Romania). In 1760, Moldavian monk Daniel from Neamț Monastery organized it as Skete.

After the Greek Revolution of 1821 Moldavians and Wallachians (from the Principality of Wallachia, the other predecessors of modern Romania which eventually united with Moldavia) stopped coming to Greece, as the situation was dangerous, while older monks returned home or died. Later new monks started coming again and Lakkoskiti received up to 90 monks in 24 huts. A new wider Kyriako (central church) of Saint Demetrios was built on the expenses of monk Ioustinos, along with a second church at the cemetery and a water-mill. Although receiving ongoing financial assistance from their governments, the Moldavian and Wallachian monks managed to live in peace and harmony without causing any political or ethnic unrest.

Lakkoskiti, being in a place hardly approachable, declined again slowly. In mid 1990s, when only one old monk was left, a new effort started with a new brotherhood, coming partially from the Romanian coenobitic Timiou Prodromou Skete and partially from Romania. Kyriakon and the huts were slowly rebuilt, the forest dirtroad was improved and more monks were added, under the guidance of geron Stefanos. As Lakkoskiti is far from the main roads, pilgrims-visitors are rare and the Romanian monks are really very attentive to them.

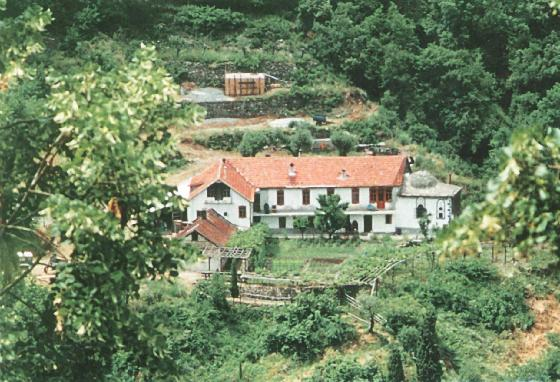
The hut (kalivi) of Annunciation of the Virgin, at Lakkoskiti.

== List of cells ==
Some cells in the main area of the skete include:

- Kyriakon of Saint Demetrius (Greek: Κυριακόν Αγίου Δημητρίου, Kyriakon Agiou Dimitriou; Romanian: Sfântul Mare Mucenic Dimitrie)
- Cell of the Annunciation (Greek: Ευαγγελισμού της Θεοτόκου, Evangelismou tis Theotokou; Romanian: Bună-Vestire)
- Cell of the Entrance of the Theotokos (Greek: Εισόδιον της Θεοτόκου, Eisodion tis Theotokou; Romanian: Intrarea Maicii Domnului în Biserică)
- Cell of the Life-Giving Spring (Greek: Ζωοδόχου Πηγής, Zoodochou Pigis; Romanian: Izvorul Tămăduirii)
- Cell of All Athonite Saints (Greek: Πάντων Αγιορειτών Αγίων, Panton Agioreiton Agion; Romanian: Tuturor Sfinților Athoniți)
- Cell of Saint Anthony the Great (Greek: Αγίου Αντωνίου, Agiou Antoniou; Romanian: Sfântul Antonie cel Mare)
- Cell of the Protection of the Theotokos (Greek: Αγίας Σκέπης, Agias Skepis; Romanian: Acoperământul Maicii Domnului)
- Cell of Saint Nicholas (Greek: Αγίου Νικολάου, Agiou Nikolaou; Romanian: Sfântul Nicolae)
- Cell of the Dormition of the Theotokos (Greek: Κοιμήσεως της Θεοτόκου, Kimiseos tis Theotokou; Romanian: Adormirea Maicii Domnului)
- Cell of the Ascension of the Lord (Greek: Αναλήψεως του Κυρίου, Analipseos tou Kyriou; Romanian: Înălțarea Domnului)
- Cell of Saint Artemios (Greek: Αγίου Αρτεμίου, Agiou Artemiou; Romanian: Sfântul Artemie)
- Cell of the Holy Archangels (Greek: Αγίων Αρχαγγέλων, Agion Archangelon)
- Cell of the Nativity of the Theotokos (Greek: Γεννήσεως της Θεοτόκου, Geniseos tis Theotokou)
- Cell of Prophet Elijah (Greek: Προφήτου Ηλία, Profitou Ilia; Romanian: Profetul Ilie)
- Cell of the Presentation of Christ (Greek: Υπαπαντής του Χριστού, Ypapantis tou Christou; Romanian: Întâmpinarea Domnului)

== See also ==
- Mount Athos
- Agiou Pavlou, the monastery Lakkoskiti belongs to
- Prodromos Skete, the other Romanian establishment on the Mountain

== Bibliography ==
- "Sfântul Munte Athos - Grădina Maicii Domnului" (Holy Mountain Athos - The Garden of Theotokos), 2nd edition, by monk Pimen Vlad, St. Martyr Artemios cell, Lakkoskete, Holy Mount Athos.
