= Amalfinon Monastery =

Former Benedictine monastery, Mount Athos

Amalfinon Monastery Monastery of the Holy Virgin Mary
- Latin: Sancte Marie Cenobii Amalfitanorum Greek: Μονή των Αμαλφηνών
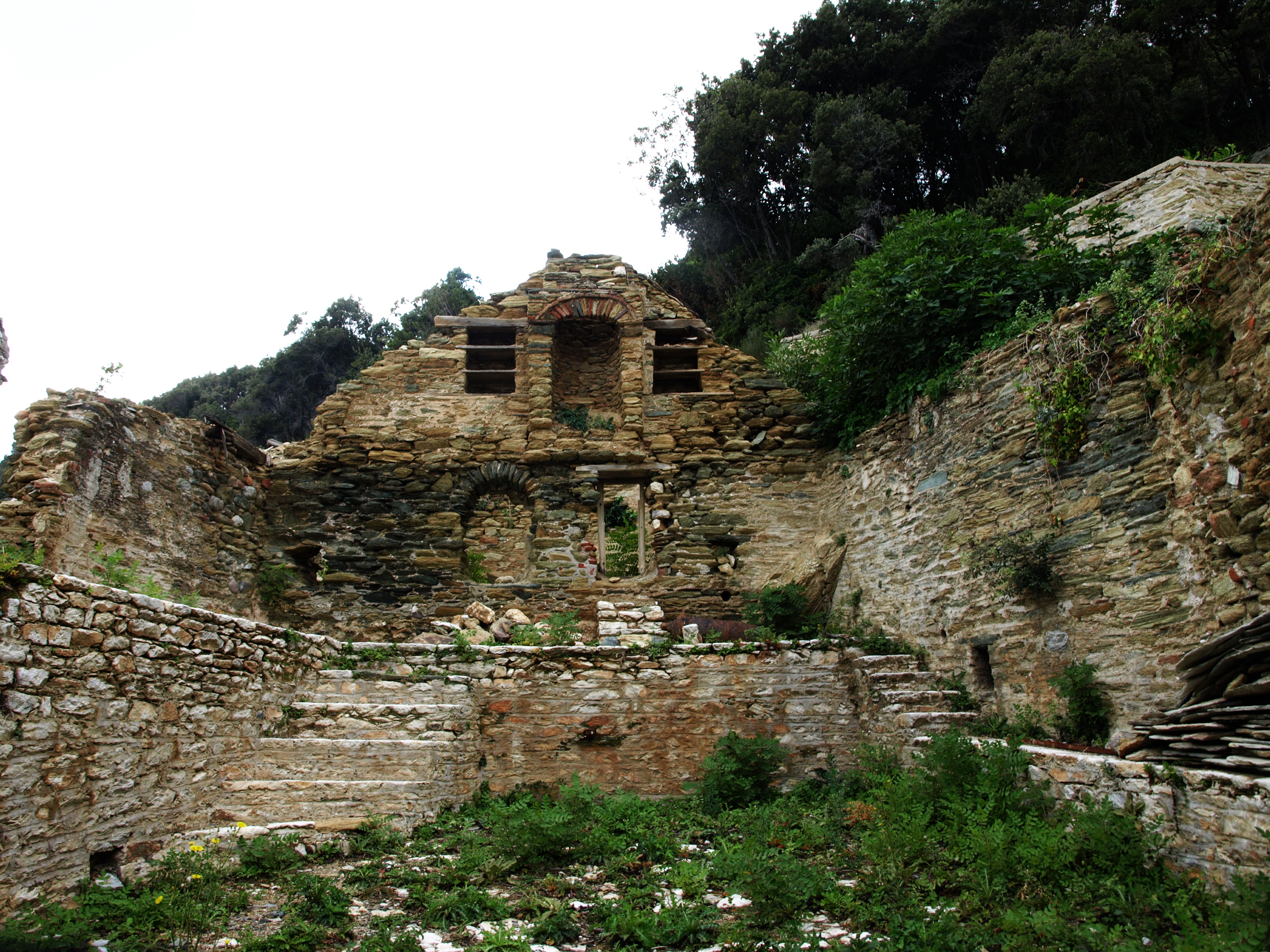
- View of the monastery ruins on Mount Athos

- Location within Mount Athos Location within Greece

Monastery information
- Full name: Monastery of the Holy Virgin Mary (Amalfinon)
- Order: Order of Saint Benedict
- Established: between 985–990 AD
- Dedication: The Blessed Virgin Mary
- Diocese: Mount Athos

People
- Founder: Elder Leo the Roman

Architecture
- Status: Ruins
- Functional status: Inactive

Site
- Location: Mount Athos, Greece
- Coordinates: 40.2042°N 24.338°E

The Amalfinon Monastery (Greek: Μονή των Αμαλφηνών, Latin: Monasterium Amalfitanorum) or Amalfion was the most prominent of the three former monasteries for Latin-speaking Christians on Mount Athos before the Great Schism. After the events of 1054, its affiliation with either Eastern Orthodox Church or the Catholic Church has been subject of debate. It was located halfway between the Athonite monasteries of Great Lavra and Karakallou Monastery.

== History ==
Amalfinon was founded in the 10th century by monks from Amalfi, Italy. They followed the Rule of Saint Benedict and used Latin as their liturgical language.

The monastery was built between the years 985 and 990 by 7 Benedictine monks under the leadership of Leo the Elder, who was invited to build the monastic community by the Georgian Orthodox at the Iviron Monastery. The earliest Benedictine monastics associated with Amalfinon were close friends with Saint Athanasius of Athos, the founder of the Great Lavra. By the 12th century the Amalfinon Monastery, remaining loyal to Eastern Orthodoxy, flourished and was held in high esteem. Records on Mount Athos show that the Abbot of Amalfinon signed, in Latin, under the signature of the Abbot of the Great Lavra.

The monastery was peacefully transferred to the Great Lavra in 1287 after suffering greatly from crusaders and being unable to repair the monastery buildings and replace monastics and clergy. The Holy Monastery of Amalfinon was turned over by Byzantine emperor Adronikos II Palaiologos to the hands of the Great Lavra Monastery.

The area surrounding the site, now called Morfonos or Amalfinos, as well as the ruins themselves, owe their names to the Monastery of Amalfinon, which was also called Morfonos. There are 5 monks of the Great Lavra tending the land around the area of Morfonos.

The monastery remained active until the 13th century, after the Great Schism in 1054. The area is still called Morfonos or Morfonou in Greek.

== Affiliation of the monastery ==
The affiliation of the Monastery of Amalfinon and its maintenance of Latin liturgical rites after the East–West Schism have sometimes seen it described as one of the earliest examples of Western Rite Orthodoxy. It has been suggested by some, such as Elene Metreveli, that the monastery was affiliated with the Catholic Church after the East-West Schism. However, multiple ecclesiastical Eastern Orthodox scholars believe the praxis of Amalfi to have remained aligned with Eastern Orthodoxy and have pointed out that expulsions of Latin Christians from Eastern Orthodox territory had occurred before, such as the expulsion of Frankish monks from the Mount of Olives in 808 for using the filioque in the Creed, or the complete expulsion of all Latins from Constantinople in 1186. Amalfinon, remaining loyal to Eastern Orthodoxy, flourished and was supported by Athos and the Byzantines long after the schism, rising to the rank of 2nd signatory after the Great Lavra.

== Notable monastics ==
List of monks and abbots of, or connected with, Amalfion:

- John and Arsenius, c. 984
- Elder Leo the Roman, founder of the monastery with six disciples and help from the Georgians of Iviron, c. 985-990
- John of Benevento of the monastery of Monte Cassino, c. 986-993
- Abbot John III of Cassino, c. 986-993
- Abbot John the Amalfitan and successors, c. 991-1035. It is unknown if all the signatories on the Athonite charters and registers from 991-1035 were the same Abbot John of Amalfitan or if there were multiple Abbots with the same name. In 1017, Abbot John signs 2nd in rank.
- Abbot Benedict, now signing under Byzantine Imperial Patronage, 1081
- Abbot Demetrius, Hegumen, 1083
- Abbot Vito, 1087-1108
- Abbot Manso or Mauro, 1169

== See also ==
- Church of Saint Mary of the Latins
- Benedict of Nursia
