= Prodromos, Mount Athos =

Romanian monastery in Mt. Athos, Greece

Prodromos
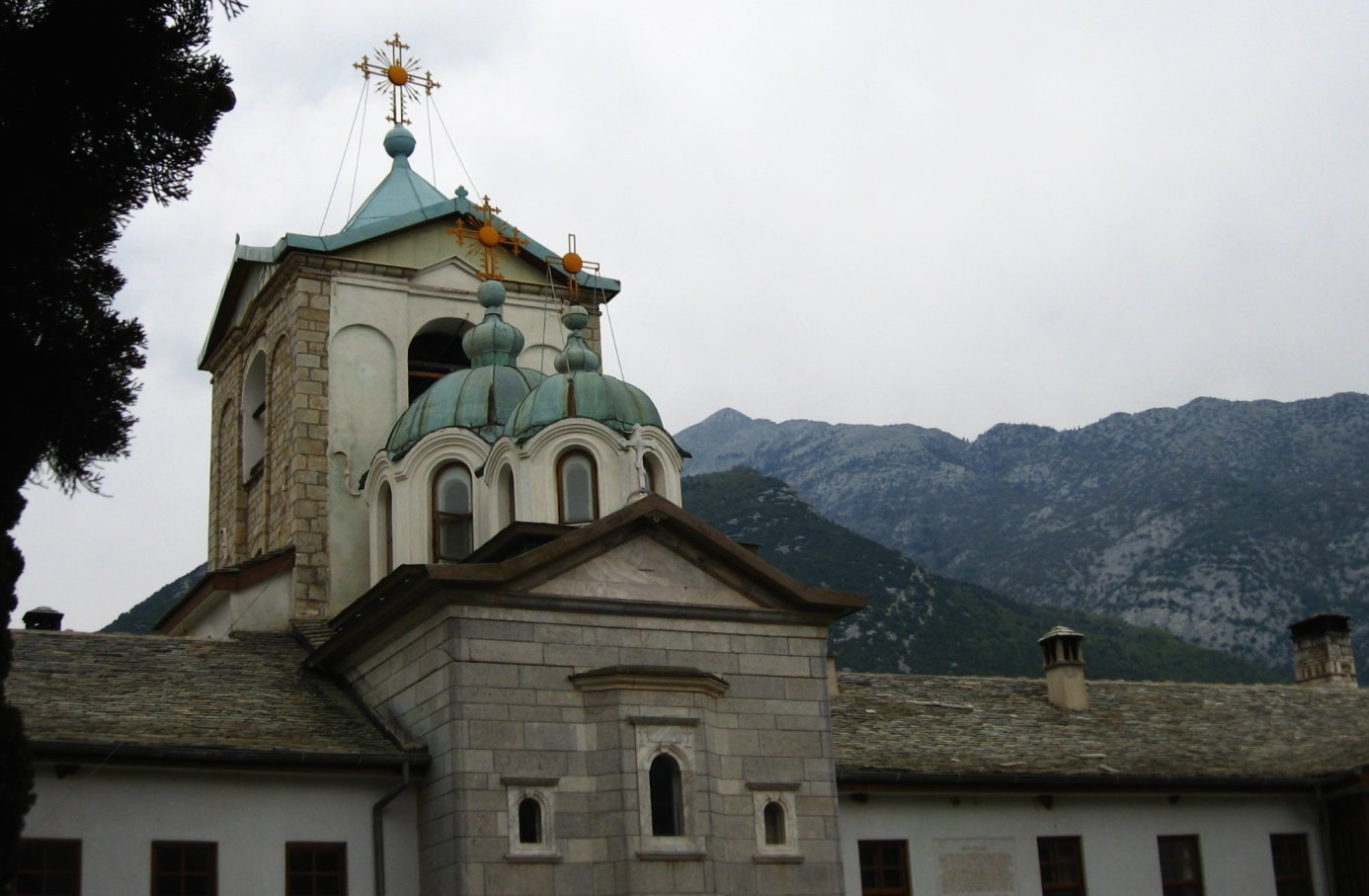
- The peak of Mount Athos as seen from the courtyard of the Prodromos Skete. On the left: the belfry and the "Dormition of the Theotokos" chapel built over the main entrance.

- Location within Mount Athos

Monastery information
- Order: Greek Orthodox

Site
- Location: Mount Athos; Greece
- Coordinates: 40°8′36.83″N 24°23′2.38″E
- Public access: Men only

The Skete of Prodromos (Greek: Τιμίου Προδρόμου, Romanian: Schitul Prodromu) is a Romanian cenobitic skete belonging to the Great Lavra Monastery. It is located in the southeastern extremity (called Vigla) of Mount Athos, near the cave of Athanasios the Athonite. Its name, Prodromos, is Greek for "The Forerunner", a cognomen of St. John the Baptist.

It is one of the two Romanian establishments at Mount Athos, the other one being Lakkoskiti.

As with all Athonite monasteries and sketes, it is under the jurisdiction of the Ecumenical Patriarchate of Constantinople. Currently, 35 monks live in the Skete of Prodromos.

== History ==
The oldest records of Romanians in this place are from around 1750, when a few monks, under the guidance of a hieromonk Macarie, lived there in seclusion near the chapel of St. John the Baptist (which gave its name to the skete). Around 1800, there were three Romanian hermits, confessor Iustin the Vlach and two apprentices, Patapie and Grigore. It is said that once Iustin drove out a swarm of locusts from the Great Lavra by sprinkling them with holy water.

As the number of Romanian monks increased around him, Iustin thought of broadening their cell by making it into a skete, and made a request to the Great Lavra, who agreed and gave its blessing. But Iustin died in 1816. His successors asked the Great Lavra for a deed to establish the skete. In 1820, they received a document of 13 articles, stating that a cell would be recognized "to the devout tribe of Moldavians for creating a coenobitic skiti". The operating conditions were that it belongs to the Great Lavra, that it will be a cenobitic skete, will have a "dikaios" (=hegumen), will have its own seal, and will obey to its duties to the Great Lavra (like the other Athonite sketes). Part of Moldavia (the Latinized exonym of Moldova) of that time belongs now to Romania, while another part is today an independent country bearing the name Moldova and the rest is part of Ukraine.

1821 marks the beginning of the Greek Revolution, and the skete cannot be founded. Monks Patapie and Grigore left for Moldavia, taking the deed to Neamț Monastery. The two died, but other two monks, Nifon and Nectarie, from Horaița Monastery (in Moldavia), found the document and in 1851 redeem the Prodromos cell from Greek monks for 7000 lei. The Great Lavra strengthened the deed, and added three more articles. Then, Nifon and Nectarie started the fund-raising. The Prince of Moldavia Grigore Alexandru Ghica contributed the largest amount, 3000 ducats, along with Metropolitan Sofronie of Moldavia and Metropolitan Nifon of Wallachia. In 1856, Patriarch Cyril VII of Constantinople approved the establishment of the skete.

The building of the skete's church began in 1857 and ended 1866 when, on 21 May, on Saints Constantine and Helena feast day, it was sanctified. The service was conducted by hegumen Isaia Vicol from Golia Monastery, in Iași. The church was sacred to the Baptism of Jesus.

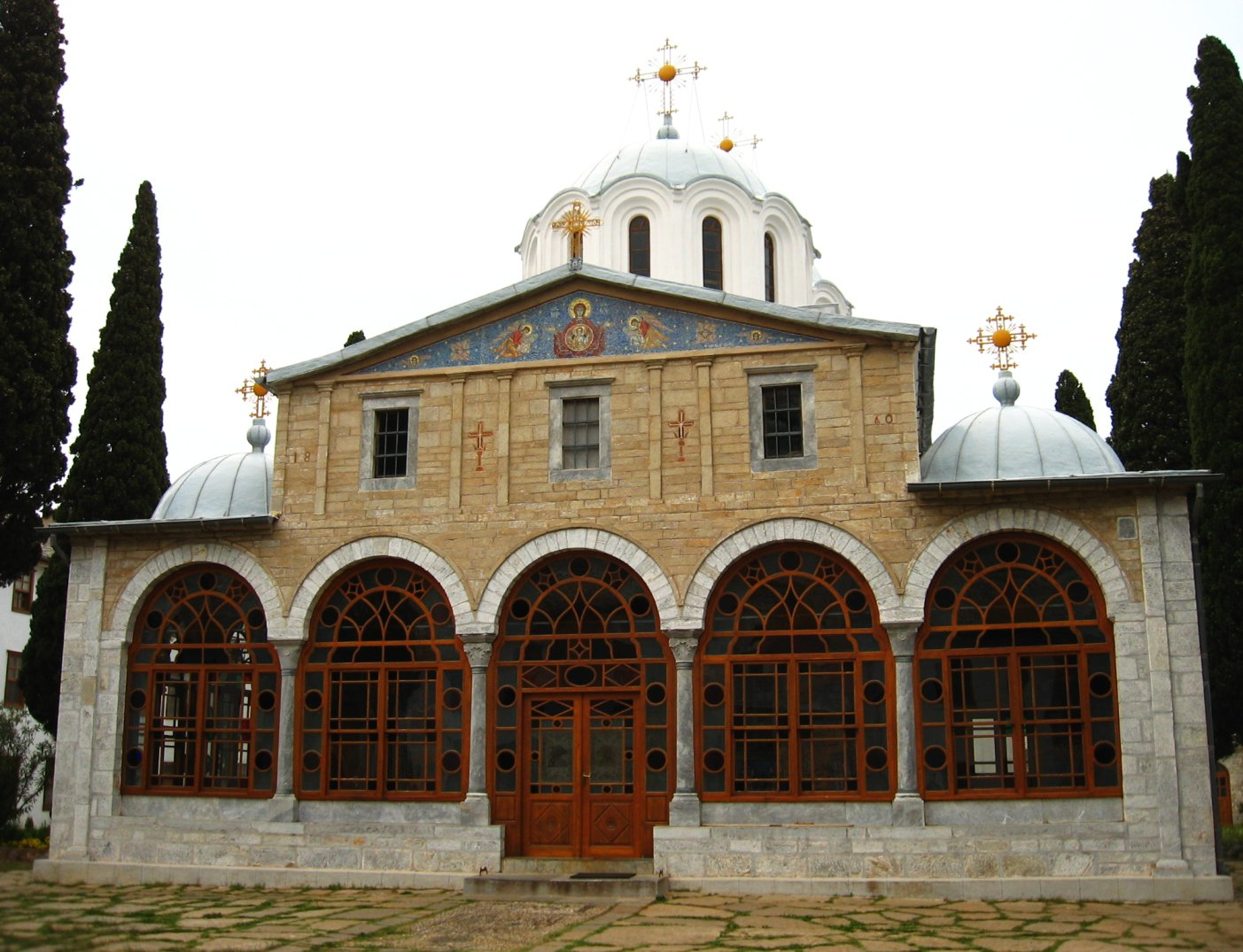
The Kyriakon (main church).

The church, 30 m long and 8.5 m wide, has three domes, and it was painted in 1862-1863 by painters from Romania in a Renaissance inspired style (typical of 19th century Romanian paintings). On the southern wall of the porch there is a depiction of Mount Athos with the monasteries and the saints living there, between which there are 14 of Romanian origin. Over the main entrance in the skete there is a 23 m high belfry and a chapel sacred to the Dormition of the Theotokos.

Seeing his wish fulfilled, hegumen Nifon retreated to a cell in a nearby St. Athanasios cave in 1870, and died in 1899. First he was buried in the cave to which he had retreated, then his remains were moved to the vault underneath church's altar.

Initially named Moldavian Skete Prodromos, after Wallachia and Moldavia united on January 24, 1859, giving birth to a new state, Romania, it changed its name to Romanian Skete Prodromos. In 1889, the Great Lavra signed a new deed to Prodromos Skete, strengthened by the seal of the Ecumenical Patriarch Dionysius V of Constantinople. It had 16 articles and, stated among other things, that the skete has the cognomen "Romanian", it is cenobitic, it belongs to the Great Lavra, the great church is sacred to the Baptism of Jesus, and the number living there is established to 60 monks and 10 brothers.

Over the years the skete was enlarged, but the communist regime in Romania confiscated its properties in the country, leaving it without means of living. Supplies from the country ceased and no new monks arrived at the skete. This status slowly began to improve after 1963 when the Mount Athos millennium celebration occurred, attended by all heads of the Eastern Orthodox Churches. The skete started receiving support from the country, and new monks arrived in 1976, founding a community of 10 elders, many of whom were ill. The restoration started in 1984 and currently is almost complete. Help was received from Romania, Greece and individuals.

On April 11, 2007, the Romanian Chamber of Deputies passed a bill stating a €250,000 yearly financing for the skete from the state's budget, through the Ministry of Culture and Religious Affairs. The money is to be used for restoring and maintaining the four churches and chapels, for promotional materials and for sustaining the activity of the monks.

== Holy relics ==
The skete, like all establishments of the Holy Mountain, holds holy relics in its church. There are remains from St. John the Baptist, St. Trifon, St. Archdeacon Stephen, St. Matthew the Evangelist, St. Barbara, St. John Chrysostom, St. Gregory the Theologian, St Modestus of Jerusalem, St. Charalampus, Saints Cosmas and Damian, unmercenary physicians and St. Martyr Trifon.

== Icons ==
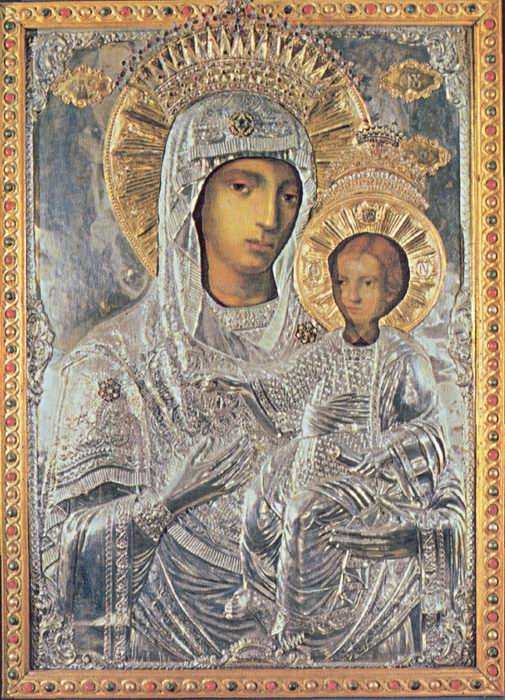
The Icon of Theotokos "Acheiropoietos" (Prodromița), 1863, said to work wonders.

The skete has, alongside icons of saints celebrated over the course of the year, five large icons, of which three are thought to perform miracles.

The Icon of Theotokos "Acheiropoieta" (i.e. not made by human hands) (Romanian: Maica Domnului «Prodromița») is the most well-known of the skete. Few icons in the Orthodox world are considered to have been miraculously painted. In 1863, after a long search, the skete's founder Nifon asked an old painter in Iași, Iordache Nicolau, to paint an icon of the Theotokos, accordingly to Church's canon - by daily reading the Akathist to the Theotokos and fasting (eating only after ceasing work that day). After painting the Holy Faces of Jesus and Mary (which, in the Orthodox iconography tradition, are painted last), the painter was not satisfied with the result, as he felt not to manage to paint the images properly. Covering the icon with a cloth, Nicolau retreated into prayer for help to finish his work. The next day he found the icon finished and beautifully painted. The icon is said to work wonders. It is covered in silver and placed in the church in front of the left rood screen. Its feast day is celebrated on July 12.

There are also The Icon of Theotokos, the one protecting from fire, The Icon of St. John the Baptist, The Icon of Three Holy Hierarchs, The Icon of the Holy Mountain.

== Library ==
The skete's library has over 5000 volumes and about 200 manuscripts of which The History of Athonite Monasteries, written by anchorite monk Irinarh Șișman (1845–1920) a century ago, consisting of 10 volumes, with beautiful ornaments, depicts the history of the Holy Mountain, all its monasteries, and the Romanian establishments in them.

== Cemetery ==
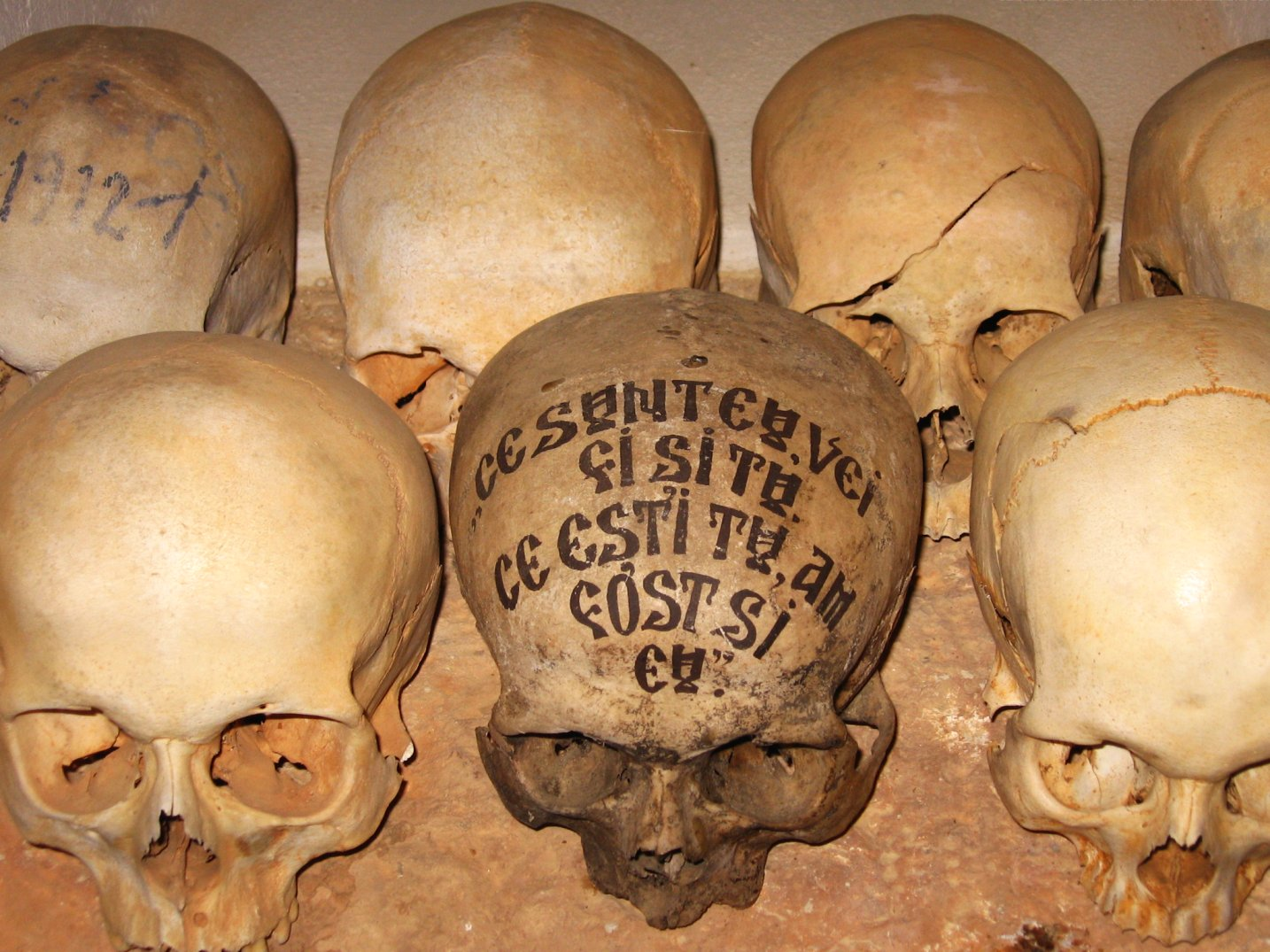
On a skull one can read the followings: "Ce sunt eu, vei fi și tu. Ce ești tu, am fost și eu." (What I am, you will be, too. What you are, I have been myself.), reminding the reader the ephemerality of his life and the constant need to think of his own death.

According to traditional practice on the Holy Mountain, the skete's cemetery has only one gravesite. It is a simple one, and it is used for all the monks who pass away. This is for two reasons. One is the lack of space for a large cemetery on the mountainous terrain. The body is then exhumed after three years (as no coffin is used in the burial, the body decomposes quickly) and the bones are afterward kept in the nearby ossuary. The second reason is that the remains may be holy relics, and exhuming them is a means to acknowledge this and treat them appropriately.

== List of cells ==
Some cells in the main area of the skete include:

- Evangelismou tis Theotokou
- Ag. Mina
- Ag. Skepis
- Ag. Tris Ierarches
- Ag. Tris Pedes
- Ag. Fanourios
- Os. Vaarlam ke Iosif
- Isodia tis Theotokou

== Dikaioi (hegumens) ==
- Nifon, 1866–1870 (anchorite in the last part of life, d. 1899)
- Hieromonk Damian, 1870–1890 (anchorite in the last part of life)
- Hieromonk Ghedeon (anchorite in the last part of life)
- Hieromonk Antipa Dinescu
- Hieromonk Hrisostom
- Archimandrite Petroniu Tănase, 1985–2011 (b. 1914, Fărcasa village, Neamț County, Romania, d. February 22, 2011; bachelor of Theology, attended also Mathematics and Philosophy courses, Athonite monk since 1978)
- Hieromonk Atanasie Floroiu, since February 13, 2011 (elected by the community on February 6 following the retirement of Fr. Petroniu. He was tonsured as a monk on December 5, 1975, at Sihăstria Monastery and is an Athonite monk since 1977, being part, like his predecessor, of the same group of monks that left for Athos to resuscitate the monastic life at the Prodromos Skete)

== Gallery ==
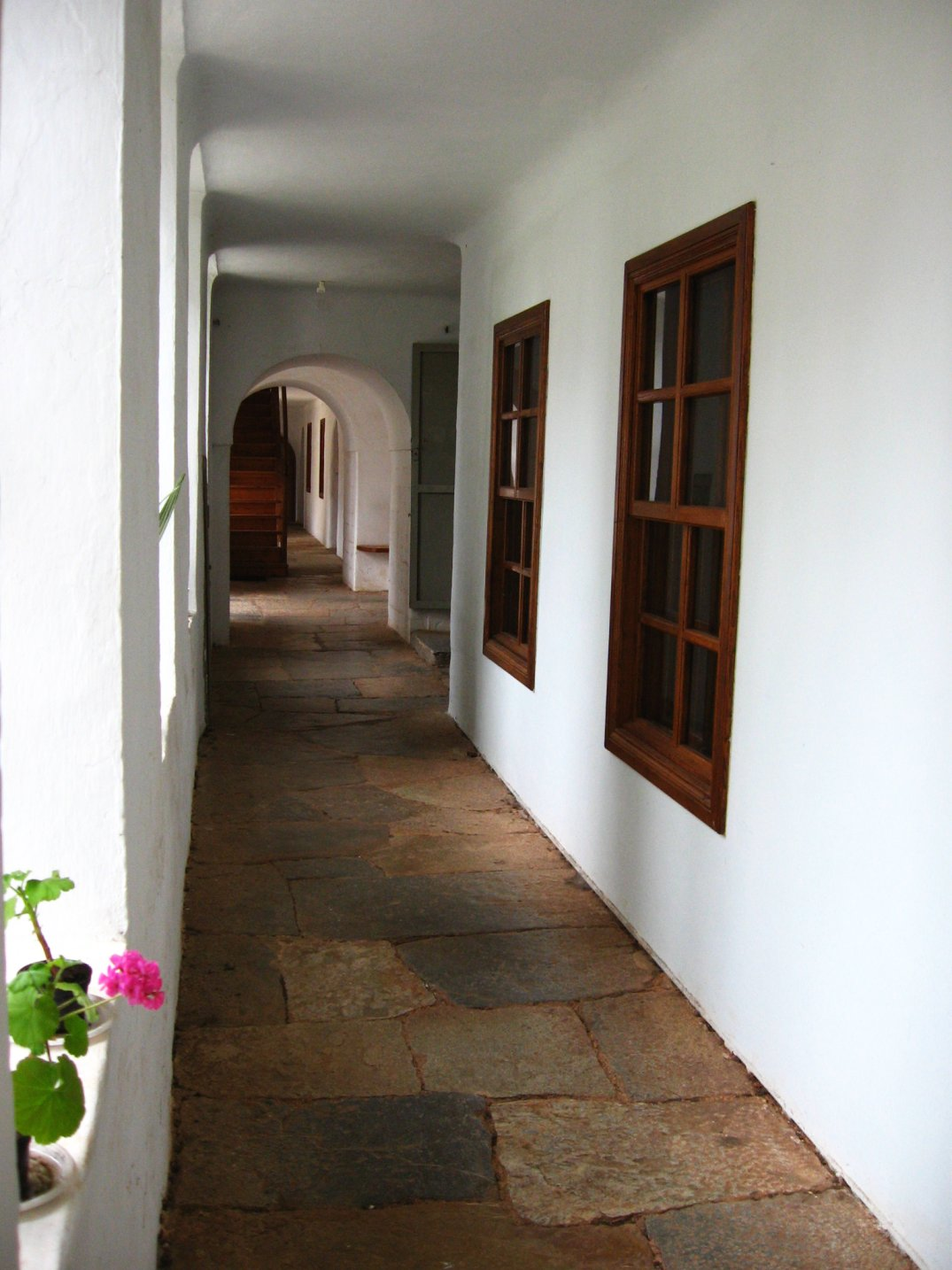

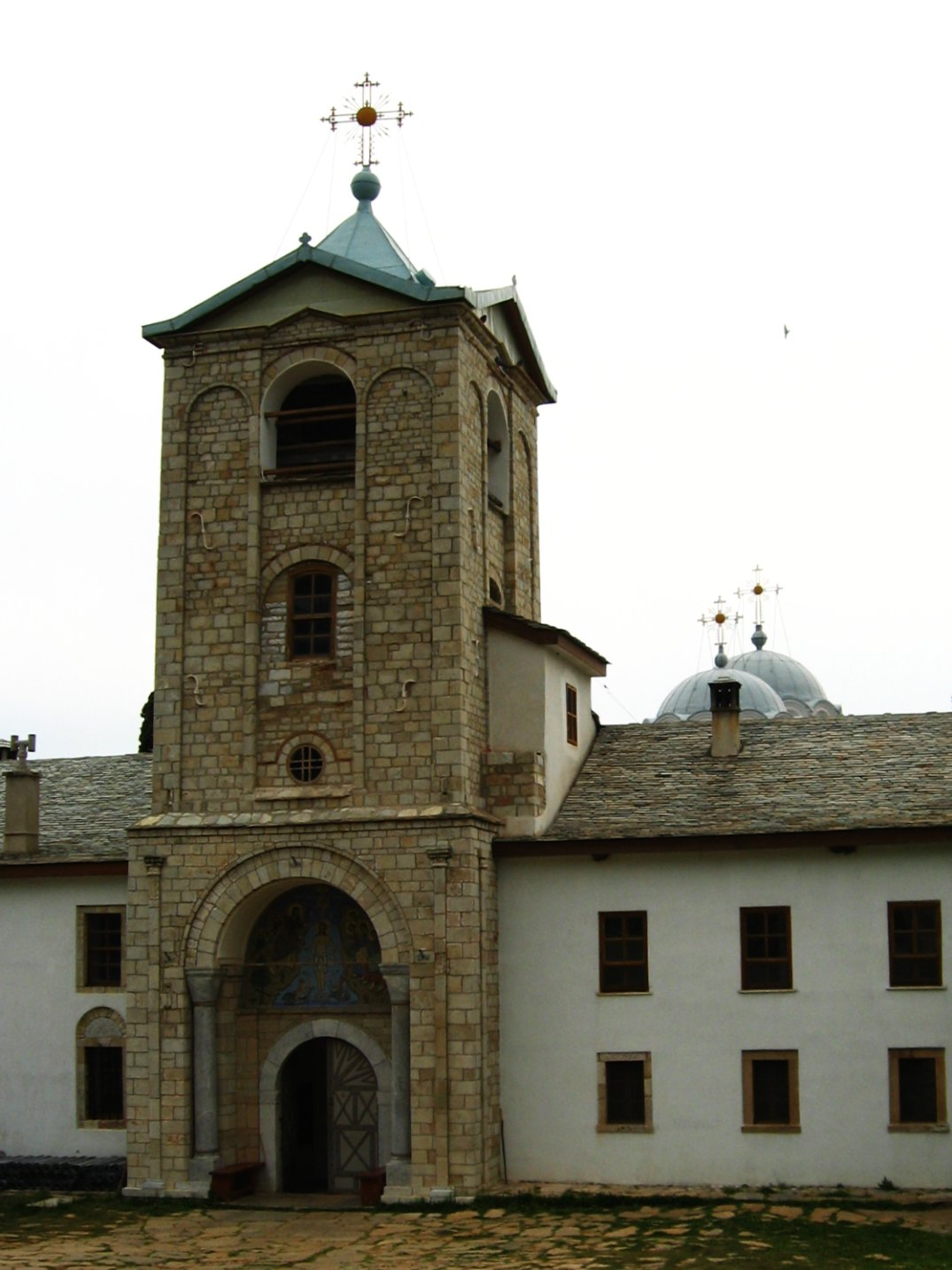

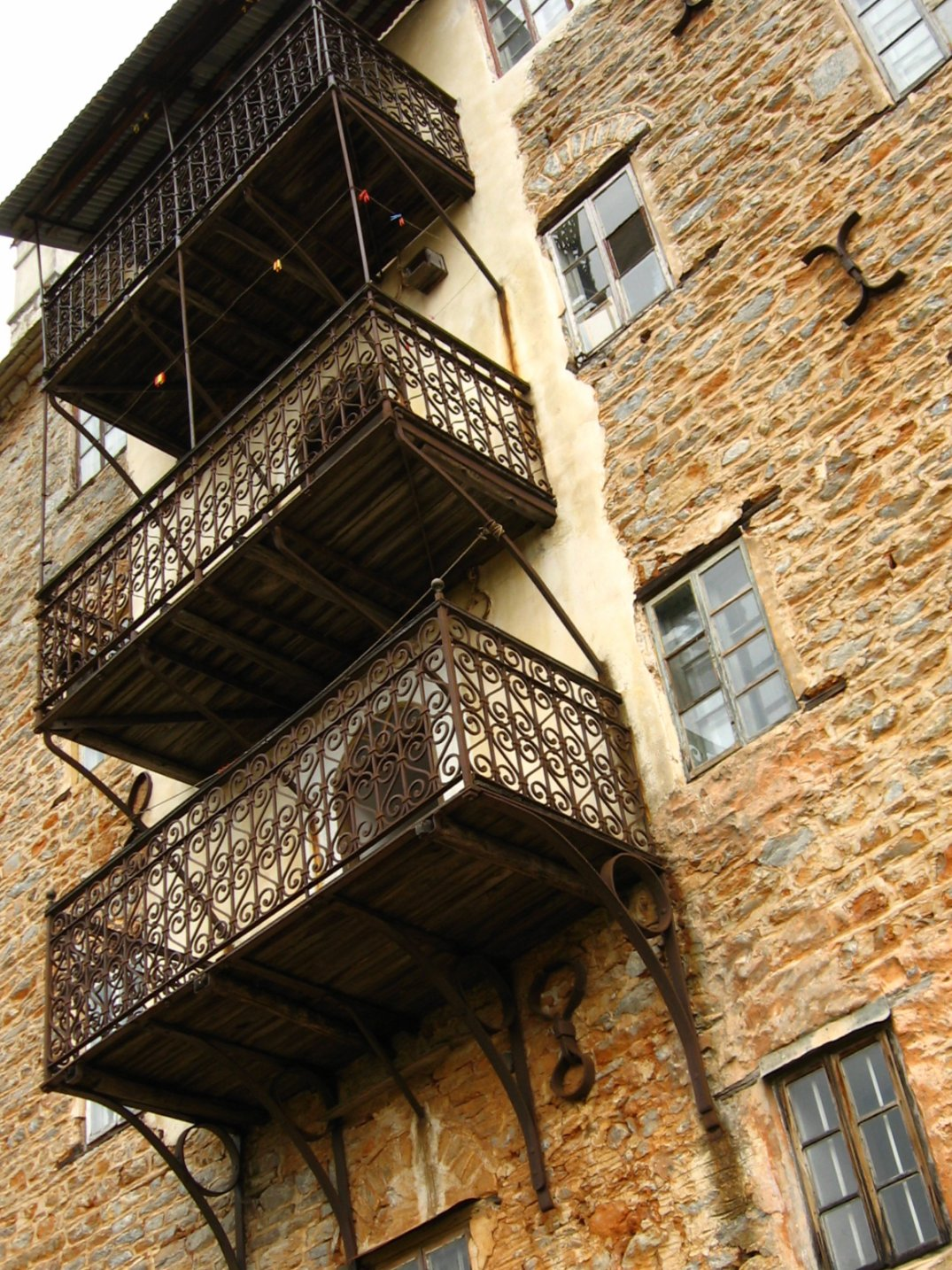

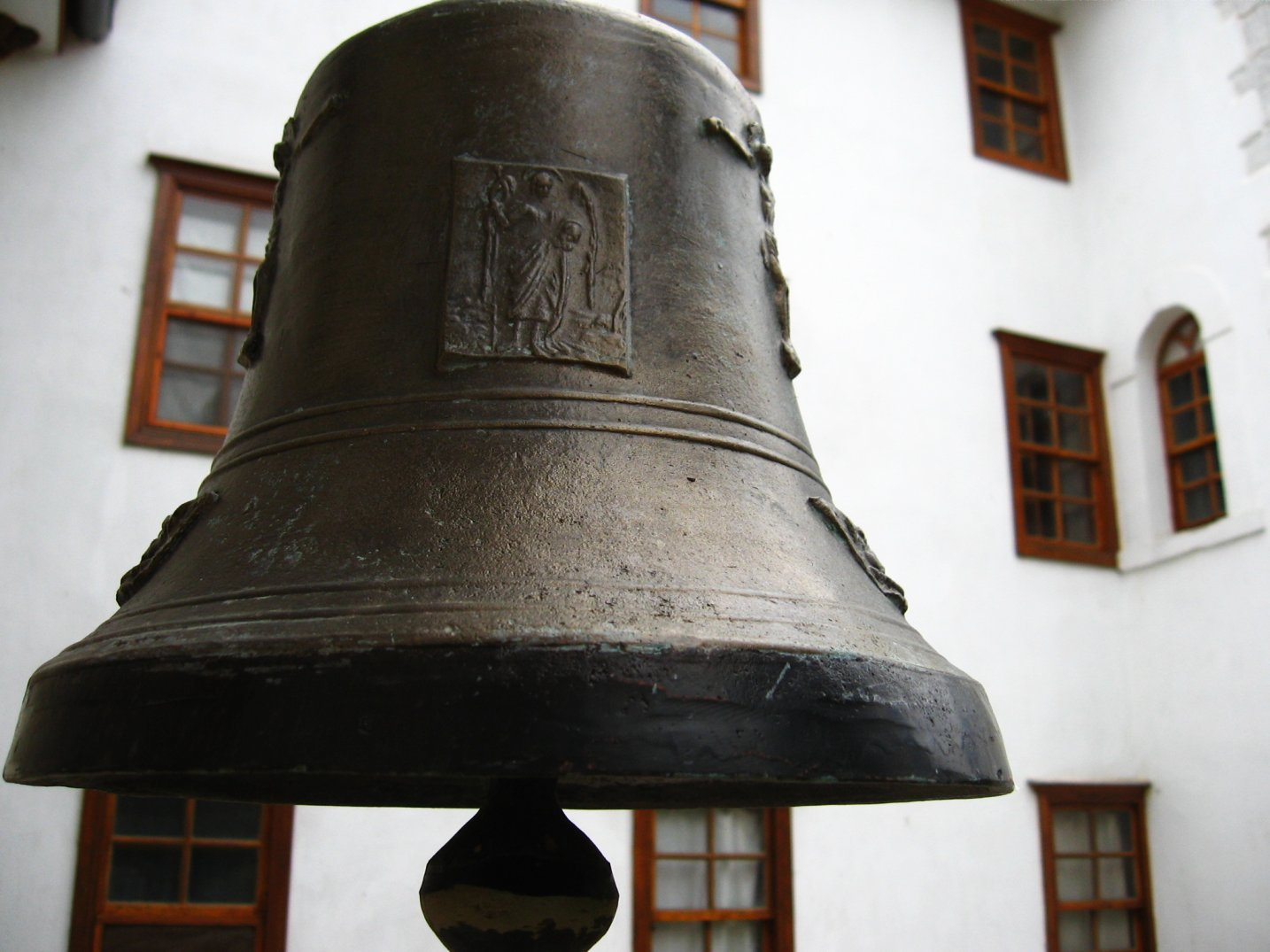

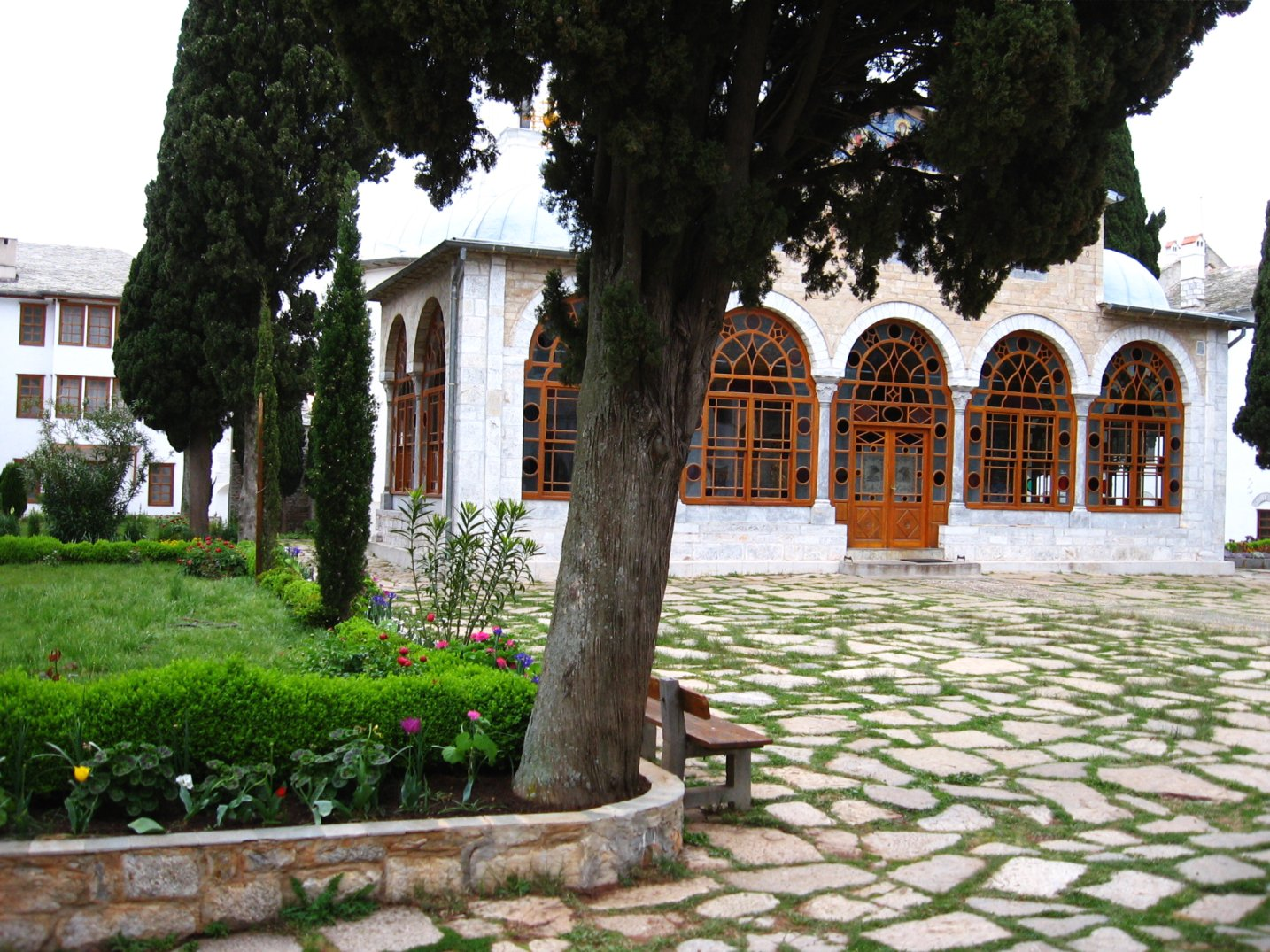

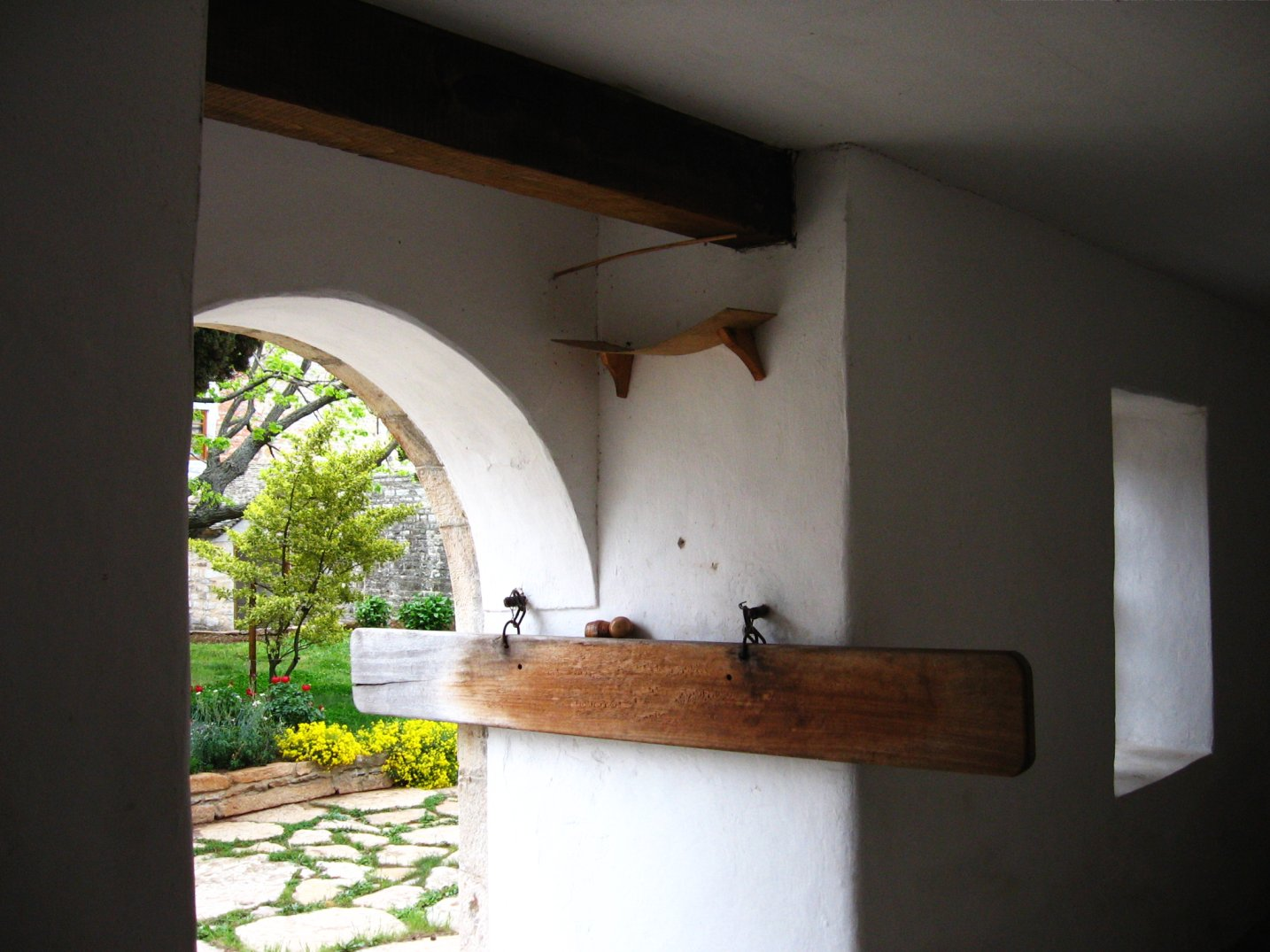

== See also ==
- Mount Athos
- Great Lavra, the monastery Prodromos belongs to
- Lakkoskiti, the other Romanian establishment on the Mountain

== Bibliography ==
- "Scurt îndrumător pentru pelerinii români" (Short Guide for Romanian Pilgrims), by Romanian Skete Prodromos, C.N.I. Coresi S.A. Ed., Bucharest, 2006.
- "Sfântul Munte Athos - Grădina Maicii Domnului" (Holy Mountain Athos - The Garden of Theotokos), 2nd edition, by monk Pimen Vlad, St. Martyr Artemios cell, Lakkoskete, Holy Mount Athos.
