= Morfonou =

Morfonou Μορφονού
- Settlement
- Location within Greece
- Coordinates: 40.2065142°N 24.3421070°E
- Country: Greece
- Administrative region: Mount Athos
- Time zone: UTC+2 (EET)
  - Summer (DST): UTC+3 (EEST)

Morfonou (Greek: Μορφονού) is an area of Mount Athos that belongs to the Monastery of Great Lavra. Located on the eastern side of the Athos peninsula, it is served by a ferry port.

The area of the Cell of Morfonou or Amalfinou derives its name from the former Amalfinon Monastery. In the area, there are 2 active cells and 2 abandoned ones.
