= Vigla, Mount Athos =

Vigla Βίγλα
- Settlement
- Location within Greece
- Coordinates: 40.1346977651°N 24.3731498822°E
- Country: Greece
- Administrative region: Mount Athos
- Elevation: 264 m (866 ft)
- Time zone: UTC+2 (EET)
  - Summer (DST): UTC+3 (EEST)

Vigla (Greek: Βίγλα) is a settlement in Mount Athos. It is located at the southeastern edge of the Athos peninsula.

The settlement of Vigla on the southeastern tip of the Athonite peninsula is not to be confused with Megali Vigla, a 510 metre-high peak within the Mount Athos monastic territory that is less than 1.5 km from the border with Greece.

== Sites ==
The Skete of Prodromos, which belongs to the Great Lavra, is located in Vigla.

The Cave of St. Athanasius the Athonite is located on the cliffside of Vigla. The cave was also where Saint Joseph the Hesychast (born Francis Kottis) took the name Joseph as he meditated there.

The Cave of the Birth of Jesus is also located in the Vigla area. Osios Theodoros lived there as an ascetic and hermit.
