= Kerasia, Mount Athos =

Kerasia Κερασιά
- Settlement
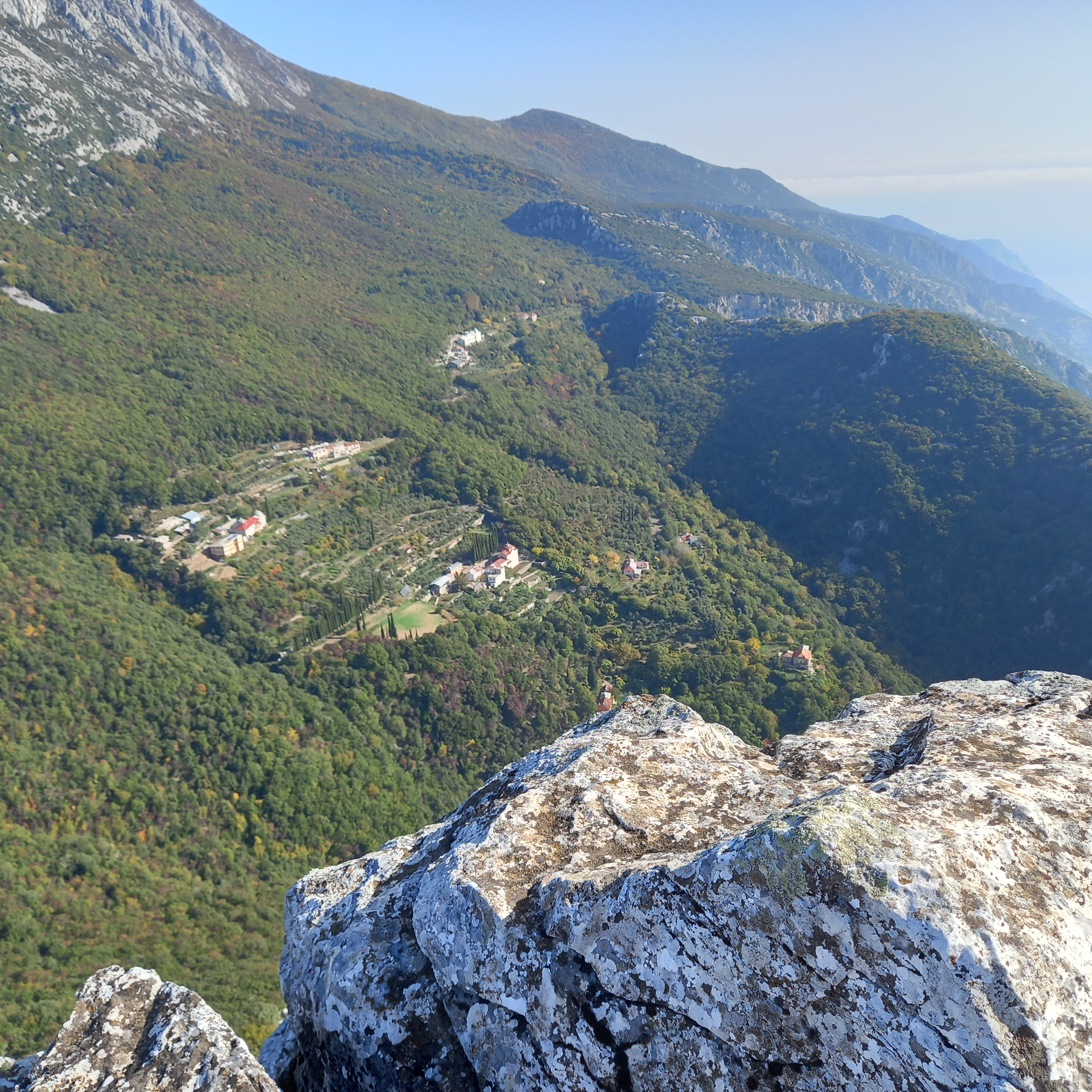
- View of Kerasia, Mount Athos from Karmilio Oros (887 m)

- Location within Greece
- Coordinates: 40.1300658305°N 24.3174622457°E
- Country: Greece
- Administrative region: Mount Athos
- Elevation: 581 m (1,906 ft)
- Time zone: UTC+2 (EET)
  - Summer (DST): UTC+3 (EEST)

Kerasia (Greek: Κερασιά) is a settlement in Mount Athos. It is located at an elevation of 581 metres on the southwestern slopes of the main peak of Mount Athos. Located just to the east of Little St. Anne's Skete and Katounakia, it is inhabited by a few dozen monks.

== List of cells ==
Some cells in Kerasia include:

- Isodia Theotokou
- Ag. Georgios
- Ag. Ioannis Theologos
- Ag. Pantes
- Ag. Nikolaos
- Timios Prodromos
- Ag. Apostoli
- Ag. Dimitrios
- Panagia

The cell of Agios Antonios (Ιερόν Κελλίον Αγίου Αντωνίου), located in an area called Paleopyrgos (Παλαιόπυργος) just to the east of Kerasia, can be reached from a footpath that leads from main the Kafsokalyvia–Kerasia footpath.

The peak of Karmilio Oros (Καρμήλιο Όρος; "Mount Carmel"; elevation: 887 m) lies just southwest of Kerasia. It is directly to the northeast of the Hermitage of Saint Basil. The Holy Chapel of the Holy Glorious Prophet Elijah (Ιερόν Παρεκκλήσιον Αγίου ενδόξου Προφήτου Ηλιού) and some radio towers sit on top of the peak.

== Notable people ==
Notable people who have lived at Kerasia include Elder Hadji-Georgis the Athonite.
