= Skete of Saint Anne =

Monastic community in Greece

Skete of St Anne
- Σκήτη Αγίας Άννας
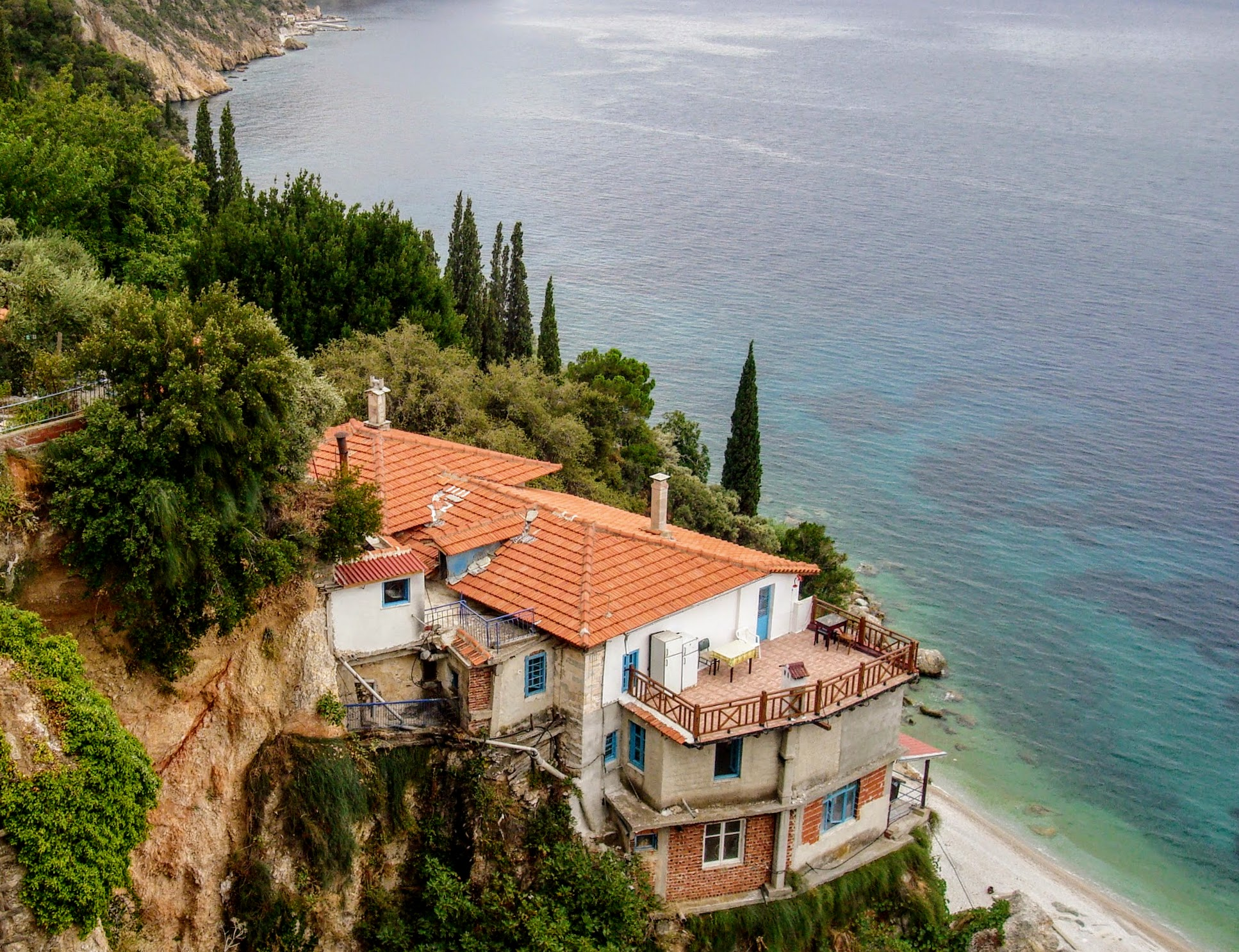

- Location within Mount Athos
- Interactive map of Skete of St Anne

Monastery information
- Order: Greek Orthodox
- Dedication: Saint Anne

Site
- Location: Mount Athos; Greece
- Coordinates: 40.1611°N 24.2903°E
- Public access: Men only

The Skete of St Anne is a dependent idiorrhythmic (hermitage-style) skete, a monastic community attached to the more formalised Great Lavra in Mount Athos, Greece.

It lies on the shore of the Aegean Sea about 800 metres from the New Skete.

The hamlet of Vouleftiria is located in the lower (western) part of the skete.

== History ==
The kyriakon (central church) of the Skete of Saint Anne was built in 1680 when the skete was being enlarged by Patriarch Dionysius III of Constantinople.

== List of cells ==
List of cells and other buildings in Agia Anna Skete:

- Geniseos Christou (Γεννήσεως Χριστού)
- Agiou Efstathiou [ruin] (Αγίου Ευσταθίου [ερείπιο])
- Geniseos Theotokou (Гεννήσεως Θεοτόκου)
- Ypapantis tou Sotiros (Υπαπαντής του Σωτήρος)
- Agion Archangelon (Αγίων Αρχαγγέλων)
- Agion Dodeka Apostolon (Αγίωv Δώδεκα Αποστόλων)
- Agiou Ioannou Theologou [ruin] (Αγίου Ιωάννου του Θεολόγου [ερείπιο])
- Agion Anargyron (Αγίων Αναργύρων)
- Agiou Georgiou Кartsonaion (Αγίου Γεωργίου «Καρτσωναίων»)
- Agiοn Serafim Fanariou (Αγίου Σεραφείμ Φαναριού)
- Agiou Antoniou (Αγίου Αντωνίου)
- Agias Triados (Αγίας Τριάδος)
- Agion Archangelon (Αγίων Αρχαγγέλων)
- Geniseos Theotokou (Гεννήσεως Θεοτόκου)
- Isodion Theotokou 'Theophileon' (Εισοδίων Θεοτόκου «Θεοφιλαίων»)
- Zoodochou Pigis (Ζωοδόχου Πηγής)
- Ergatospito (Εργατόσπιτο)
- Agiou Ioannou Chrysostomou (Αγίου Ιωάννου του Χρυσοστόμου)
- Ypapantis Christou (Υπαπαντής του Χριστού)
- Agiou Dimitriou [ruin] (Αγίου Δημητρίου [ερείπιο])
- Agias Triados (Αγίας Τριάδος)
- Evangelismou (Ευαγγελισμού)
- Metamorphoseos Christou 'Tampaki' (Μεταμορφώσεως του Χριστού «Ταμπάκη»)
- Analipseos (Αναλήψεως)
- Evangelismou tis Theotokou (Ευαγγελισμού της Θεοτόκου)
- Agion Modestou ke Charalampous [ruin] (Αγ Μοδέστου και Χαραλάμπους [ερείπιο])
- Kimiseos tis Theotokou (Κοιμήσεως της Θεοτόκου)
- Isodion tis Theotokou (Εισοδίων της Θεοτόκου)
- Trion Ierarchon (Τριών Ιεραρχών)
- Kimiseos Theotokou (Κοιμήσεως της Θεοτόκου)
- Agiou Dimitriou (Αγίου Δημητρίου)
- Agion Panton 'Volioton' (Αγίων Πάντων «Βολιωτών»)
- Kimiseos Theotokou (Κοιμήσεως της Θεοτόκου)
- Ypsoseos Timiou Stavrou 'Ananeon' (Υψώσεως Τίμιου Σταυρού «Αναναίων»)
- Kimiseos Theotokou (Κοιμήσεως της Θεοτόκου)
- Apotomis Timiou Prodromou (Αποτομής Τιμίου Προδρόμου)
- Agiou Panteleimonos (Αγίου Παντελεήμονος)
- Agiou Artemiou (Αγίου Αρτεμίου)
- Agion Archangelon (Αγίων Αρχαγγέλων)
- Apotomis Timiou Prodromou (Αποτομής Τιμίου Προδρόμου)
- Agiou Eleftheriou (Αγίου Ελευθερίου)

== Notable people ==
- Cyril V of Constantinople
- Nicodemus of Elbasan

== Namesakes ==
Centaurea sanctae-annae, a species of knapweed, is named after the skete.
