= Karoulia =

Greek Orthodox hermitage in Mount Athos

- Σκήτη Καρούλια
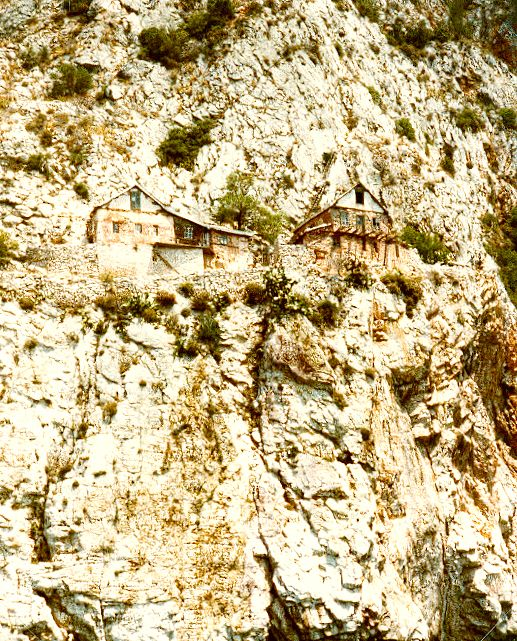
- Cliff dwellings of Karoulia

- Location within Mount Athos
- Interactive map of Karoulia

Site
- Location: Mount Athos; Greece
- Coordinates: 40°7′21.45″N 24°17′44.46″E
- Public access: Men only

Karoulia (Greek: Καρούλια, lit. 'pulley') is an Eastern Orthodox skete of the community of Mount Athos that is subordinate to the Great Lavra. It is located on the southernmost shore of Mount Athos.

Karoulia has 12 huts built in the 17th century. About 10 monks live in Karoulia.

== Description ==
The monks at Karoulia practice hesychasm and asceticism. Their dwellings are caves or small huts that cling to the side of the mountain, at 100–500 m above the sea. Access is only possible by ladder or rope. The monks pray there alone or sometimes with a few people while contemplating the sea and the landscape. Vegetarian monks (Greek: βοσκοί) who ate only plants and herbs once lived at Karoulia.

Karoulia can be divided into Outer Karoulia, which is the lower part of Karoulia by the seashore, and Inner Karoulia (also nicknamed "Frightful Karoulia"), located in the cliffs.

The port of Karoulia is called Katounakia, from which there is a ferry to Dafni.

== Notable people ==
- Nikon of Karoulia, a Russian hermit who lived at St. George's, Karoulia from 1941 to 1963
