= September 7 (Eastern Orthodox liturgics) =

Day in the Eastern Orthodox liturgical calendar

Eastern Orthodox liturgical calendar
| September 6 | September 7 | September 8 |
September 7 O.S. ≍ September 20 N.S. September 7 N.S ≍ August 25 O.S.

An Eastern Orthodox cross

September 7 in Eastern Orthodox liturgical calendars is a feast day and a day of commemoration of saints and martyrs. Although some Orthodox churches use the Revised Julian Calendar and others use the traditional Julian calendar, the fixed commemorations for their respective September 7 are broadly the same, no matter which calendar is used. (Note: Despite the dates being the same, the days to which they refer typically differ by 13 days. The notation Old Style or O.S. is sometimes used to indicate a date in the traditional Julian Calendar (the "Old Calendar"). The notation New Style or N.S. indicates a date in the Revised Julian calendar (the "New Calendar").)

== Feasts ==
- Forefeast of the Nativity of the Theotokos.

== Saints ==
- Apostles Evodius (Euodias) (66) and Onesiphorus (67), of the Seventy Apostles.
- Martyr Eupsychios of Caesarea in Cappadocia (c. 130) (Note: "At Caesarea, in Cappadocia, in the time of the emperor Adrian, St. Eupsychius, martyr, who, on being accused of professing Christianity, was cast into prison. His release following shortly after, he immediately sold his patrimony, and distributed the proceeds of it partly to the poor and partly to his accusers, whom he regarded as his benefactors. But being again arrested, under the judge Sapritius, he was lacerated, pierced through with a sword, and thus consummated his martyrdom.")
- Hieromartyr Stephen, Pope of Rome, and Companions (257) (Note: He is commemorated on September 7 ONLY in certain Synaxaria. See also: August 2, August 3.)
- Martyr Sozon of Cilicia (304) (Note: "At Pompeiopolis, in Cilicia, St. Sozon, martyr, who, being thrown into the fire, yielded up his spirit, in the time of the emperor Maximian.") (Note: Name days celebrated today include: Sozon (Σώζων).)
- Martyr Sozon of Cyprus (7th century) (Note: His relics are kept at the Monastery of Machairas and the Monastery of Chrysorrogiatissa.)
- Venerable Kassiani the Hymnographer (Kassia), Byzantine Nun, confessor, hymnographer, patron saint of Kasos island (9th century) (Note: Name days celebrated today include: Kassia, Kassiani, Cassiane, Cassiana (Κασσιανή); Kassianos, Cassian (Κασσιανός).)
- Venerable Peter the Cappadocian, second Abbot of the Monastery of the Deep Stream, in Triglia, near Constantinople (10th century) (Note: Venerable Peter the Cappadocian was the disciple of Venerable Basil, the founder of the Monastery of the Deep Stream (see July 1), whom he succeeded as Abbot. He originated from the second eparchy of Cappadocia, and he was distinguished by his devotion to the ascetic life.)
- Venerable Luke of Lycaonia, third Abbot of the Monastery of the Deep Stream, in Triglia, near Constantinople (after 975)

== Pre-Schism Western saints ==
- Saint Regina (Reine), a virgin-martyr venerated in Autun in France (c. 286) (Note: "In the diocese of Autun, St. Regina, virgin and martyr, under the proconsul Olybrius. After having suffered imprisonment, the rack, and burning with torches, she was condemned to capital punishment, and so went to her spouse.")
- Saint Anastasius the Fuller, martyred by drowning (304) (Note: A fuller in Aquileia, not far from Venice in Italy. He went to Dalmatia and continued his trade in Salona where he openly confessed Orthodoxy, painting a conspicuous cross on his door. He was seized and drowned.)
- Saint Evortius (Euvert), Bishop of Orleans in France (c. 340) (Note: "At Orleans, in France, the departure from this life of the holy bishop Evortius, who was first a subdeacon of the Roman Church, and afterwards, through the divine favor, was designated bishop of that city by a dove." The monastery of Saint-Euvert (Église Saint-Euverte d'Orléans) was founded to enshrine his relics.) (Note: See: (in French) Euverte d'Orléans. Wikipedia. (French Wikipedia).)
- Saint Pamphilus, a Greek by birth, Bishop of Capua in Italy (c. 400) (Note: His relics were enshrined in Benevento.)
- Saint Grimonia (Germana), a holy virgin from Ireland, martyred in Picardy in defence of her virtue (4th century)
- Saint Augustalis (Autal), Bishop of Arles, Confessor (c. 450)
- Saint Memorius (Nemorius, Mesmin) and five Companions, beheaded by Attila the Hun (451) (Note: A deacon in Troyes in France with St Lupus, who sent him to the camp of Attila with five companions to ask for mercy. Attila had them all beheaded.) (Note: "At Troyes, St. Nemorius, deacon, and his companions, martyrs, who were slain by Attila, king of the Huns.")
- Saint Gratus of Aosta, Bishop of Aosta in Italy, of which he is patron-saint (c. 470)
- Saint Carissima, an anchoress in a forest near Albi in France, and then at the convent of Viants (Vious) (5th century)
- Saint Cloud (Clodoald), Abbot and founder of Nogent-sur-Seine Monastery, near Paris (560) (Note: Grandson of King Clovis and St Clotilde, he became a priest and hermit. He founded the monastery of Nogent-sur-Seine, now called Saint-Cloud after him.) (Note: "In the territory of Paris, St. Cloud, priest and confessor.")
- Saint Balin (Balanus, Balloin) (7th century) (Note: Brother of St Gerald and one of the four sons of a noble in England. After accompanying St Colmán of Lindisfarne to Iona in Scotland, he and his brothers went to Connaught in Ireland and settled at Tecksaxon, 'The House of the Saxons', near Tuam.)
- Saint Madalberta, Abbess of Maubeuge Abbey (706) (Note: Daughter of Sts Vincent Madelgarius and Waldetrudis. She was educated by her aunt, St Aldegonde, the foundress of Maubeuge, where she became a nun. About the year 697 she succeeded her sister St Aldetrudis as abbess.)
- Saint Hilduard (Hilward, Garibald), founder of the monastery of St Peter in Dickelvenne on the Schelde in Belgium (c. 750)
- Saint Alchmund of Hexham, seventh Bishop of Hexham in England (781) (Note: "ST. ALCHMUND succeeded Frithebert as Bishop of Hexham in 767, and governed the diocese with a high reputation for holiness of life and vigilance in his pastoral office. He died in 781, and was buried by the side of St. Acca, one of his holy predecessors. Over 250 years after his death, St. Alchmund appeared to a pious priest of Hexham, and ordered that his body should be translated to a more honourable place in the same church, which was done with great pomp and devotion on the 4th August.")
- Saint Tilbert (Gilbert), Bishop of Hexham in Northumbria in England (789)
- Saint Faciolus, a monk at the monastery of St Cyprian in Poitiers in France (c. 950)
- Saint Gosslin (Gauzelin, Goscelinus) of Toul, Bishop of Toul in France (962)
- Saint Theoderic of Metz, Bishop of Metz in Germany (984)

== Post-Schism Orthodox saints ==
- Saint John of Novgorod (Elias, Ilya), Archbishop and Wonderworker of Novgorod (1186)
- Saints Alexander (Peresvet) (Note: See: (in Russian) Александр Пересвет. Википедии. (Russian Wikipedia).) and Andrew (Oslyabya), (Note: See: (in Russian) Родион Ослябя. Википедии. (Russian Wikipedia).) disciples of St. Sergius of Radonezh, who fought at the Battle of Kulikovo (1380)
- Saints Symeon (1476) and Amphilochius (1570), of Pângărați Monastery, Romania. (Note: See: (in Romanian) Mănăstirea Pângărați. Wikipedia. (Romanian Wikipedia).)
- Venerable Serapion of Spaso-Eleazar Monastery in Pskov (1480) (See also: September 8)
- Hieromartyr Macarius of Kanev, Archimandrite, of Obruch and Pinsk (1678)
- Saint Macarius of Optina, Elder of Optina Monastery (1860) (Note: See: (in Russian) Макарий Оптинский. Википедии. (Russian Wikipedia).)
- Venerable Elder Daniel of Katounakia (1929) (Note: On October 20, 2019, at the Protaton Church in Karyes on Mt. Athos, Ecumenical Patriarch Bartholomew announced that the glorification of four great 20th-century Athonite elders would soon proceed, including: Daniel of Katounakia (†1929); Ieronymos of Simonopetra (†1957); Joseph the Hesychast (†1959), and; Ephraim of Katounakia (†1998).; Elder Daniel was officially glorified by the Holy Synod of the Ecumenical Patriarchate on March 9, 2020, to be commemorated each year either on: 1) the date of his repose, September 8, which is the feast of the Nativity of the Most Holy Theotokos; or 2) on September 7th; ("ἡμέρα τῆς ἐτησίας ἱερᾶς μνήμης αὐτοῦ ἡ 7η μηνός Σεπτεμβρίου"). His brotherhood asked for him to be celebrated on the Holy Mountain on the day before the feast, namely on September 7/20.)

=== New martyrs and confessors ===
- New Hieromartyrs Peter Sneznitsky and Michael Tikhonitsky, Priests (1918)
- New Hieromartyr Alexander, Deacon (1918)
- New Hieromartyr John Maslovsky, Priest, of Verkhne-Poltavka, Amur (1921)
- New Hieromartyr Eugene (Zernov), Metropolitan of Nizhny Novgorod (Gorky) (1937) (Note: See: (in Russian) Евгений (Зёрнов). Википедии. (Russian Wikipedia).)
- New Hieromartyr Leo (Yegorov), Archimandrite, of the St. Alexander Nevsky Lavra (1937) (Note: See: (in Russian) Лев (Егоров). Википедии. (Russian Wikipedia).)
- New Hieromartyr Nicholas (Ashchepev), Abbot, of the Holy Trinity Selinginsk Monastery (1937)
- New Hieromartyr Eugene (Vyzhva), Abbot, of Zhitomir, Ukraine (1937)
- New Hieromartyr Pachomius (Ionov), Hieromonk of the Holy Trinity Skanov Monastery, Penza (1937)
- New Hieromartyr Stephen (Kreidich), Priest, of Robchik, Bryansk (1937)
- New Hieromartyr Gregory Averin, Priest of Ivanovo (1937) (Note: See: (in Russian) Аверин, Григорий Иванович. Википедии. (Russian Wikipedia).)
- New Hieromartyr Basil Sungurov, Priest (1937)

== Other commemorations ==
- Repose of Metropolitan Isidore (Nikolsky) of St. Petersburg (1892) (Note: See: (in Russian) Исидор (Никольский). Википедии. (Russian Wikipedia).)
- Repose of New Hieromartyr Anatole (Kamensky), Archbishop of Irkutsk (1925) (Note: See: (in Russian) Анатолий (Каменский). Википедия. (Russian Wikipedia).) (Note: See: (in Russian) Анатолий (Каменский). Википедии. (Russian Wikipedia).) (Note: In 1981, by decision of the Council of Bishops of the Russian Orthodox Church Abroad canonized as New Hieromartyr Anatole (Kamensky), Archbishop of Irkutsk (without establishing a separate memory of the day). The time and place of Abp. Anatole's death is uncertain. He died on September 7 (o. s.) / 20 (n. s.) in Omsk. His commemorated by Russian Orthodox Church Abroad on the following feast days: New Martyrs and Confessors of Russia - (the Sunday nearest January 25 (o. s.) / February 7 (n. s.)); Synaxis of the New-Martyrs of the American Land - (December 12 (o. s.) / 25 (n. s.)).)

== Icon gallery ==
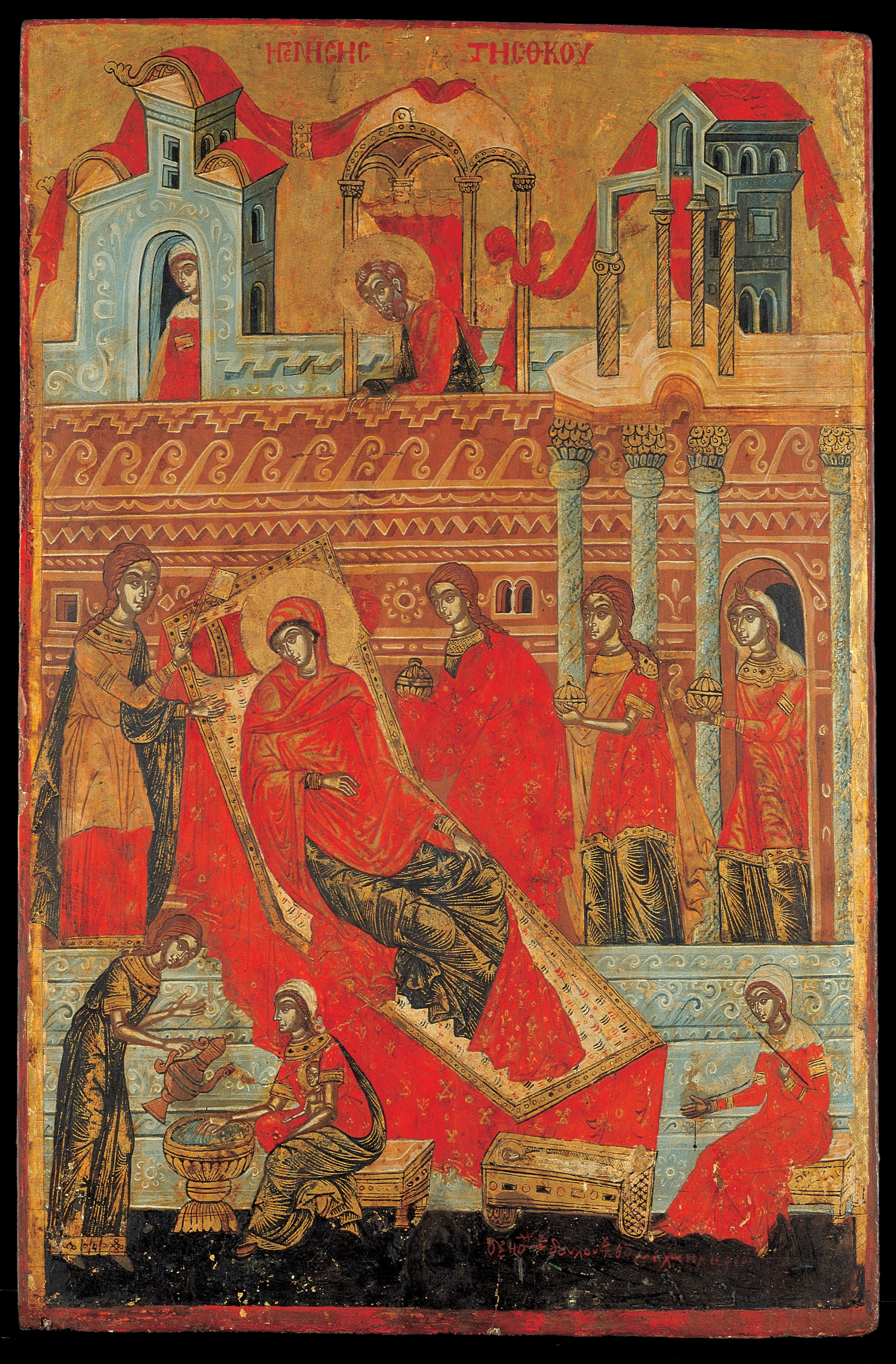
Nativity of the Theotokos.

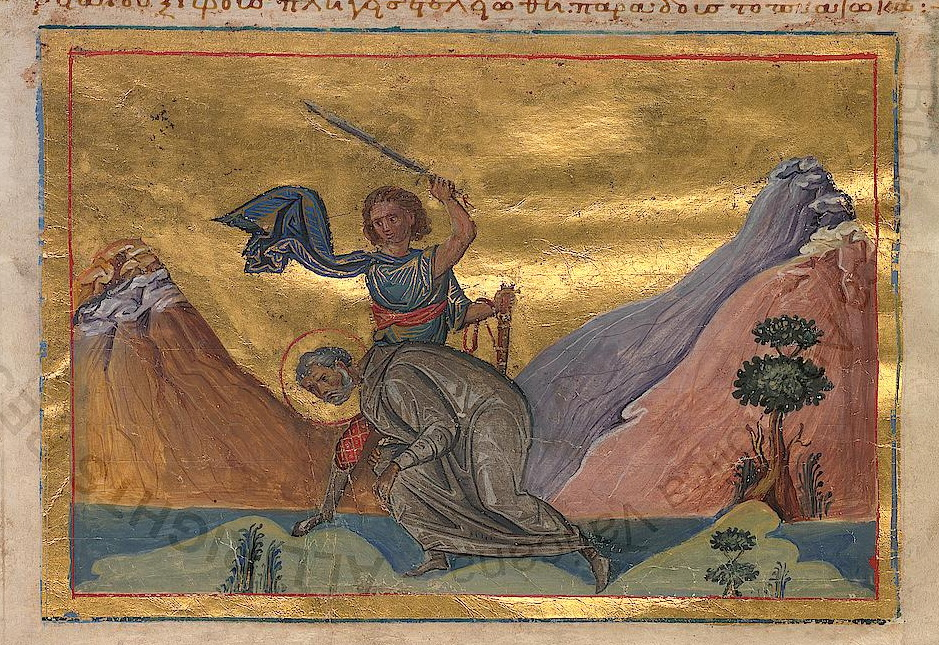
Martyr Eupsychios of Caesarea in Cappadocia.
(Menologion of Basil II, 10th century).

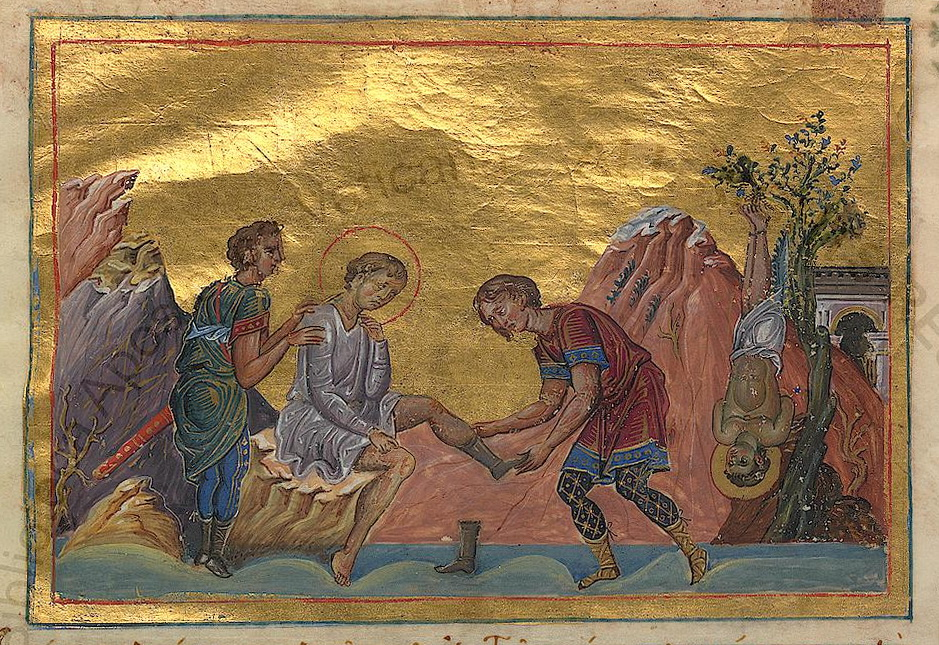
Martyr Sozon of Cilicia.
(Menologion of Basil II, 10th century).

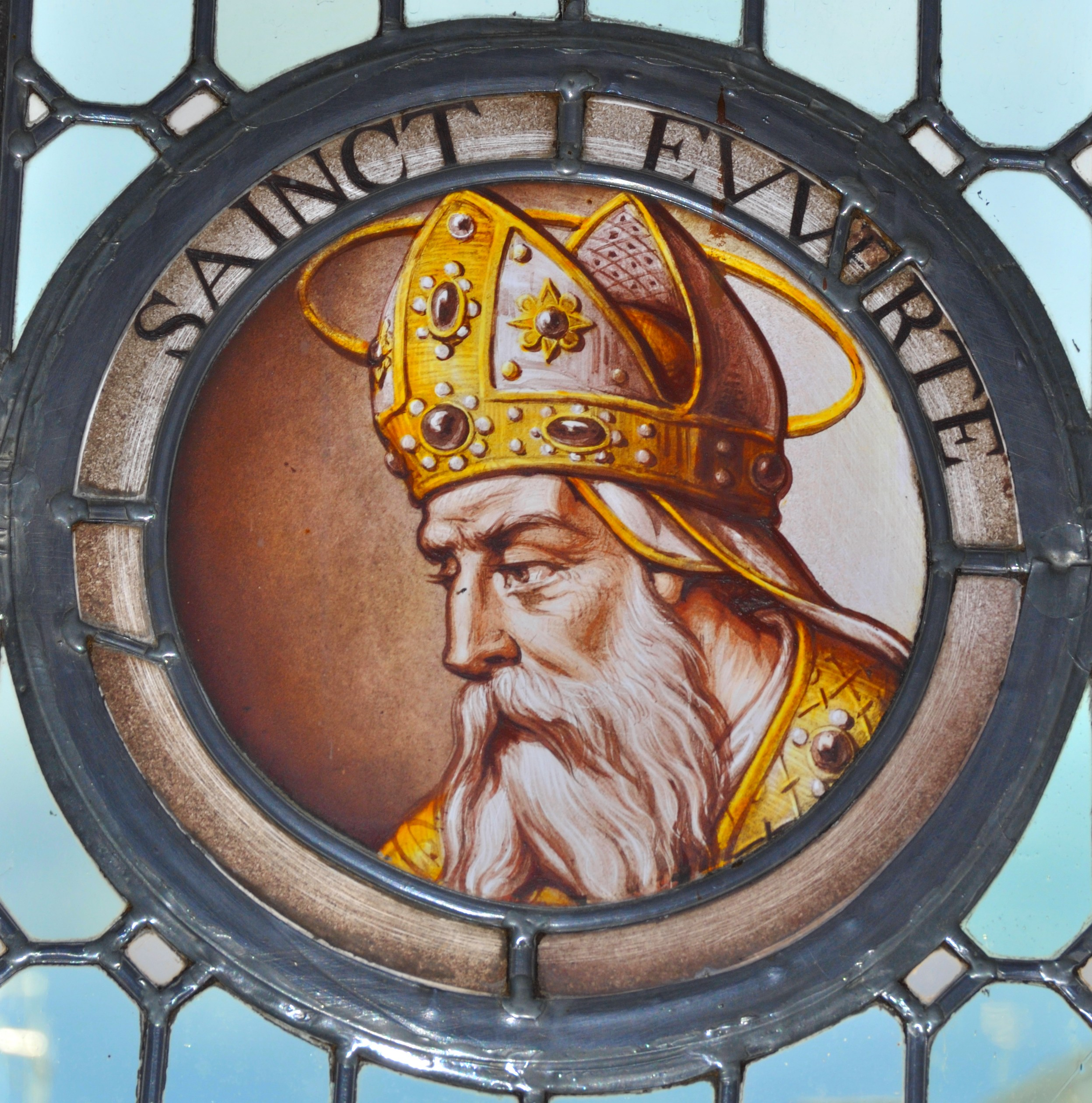
Saint Euvert, Bishop of Orleans.

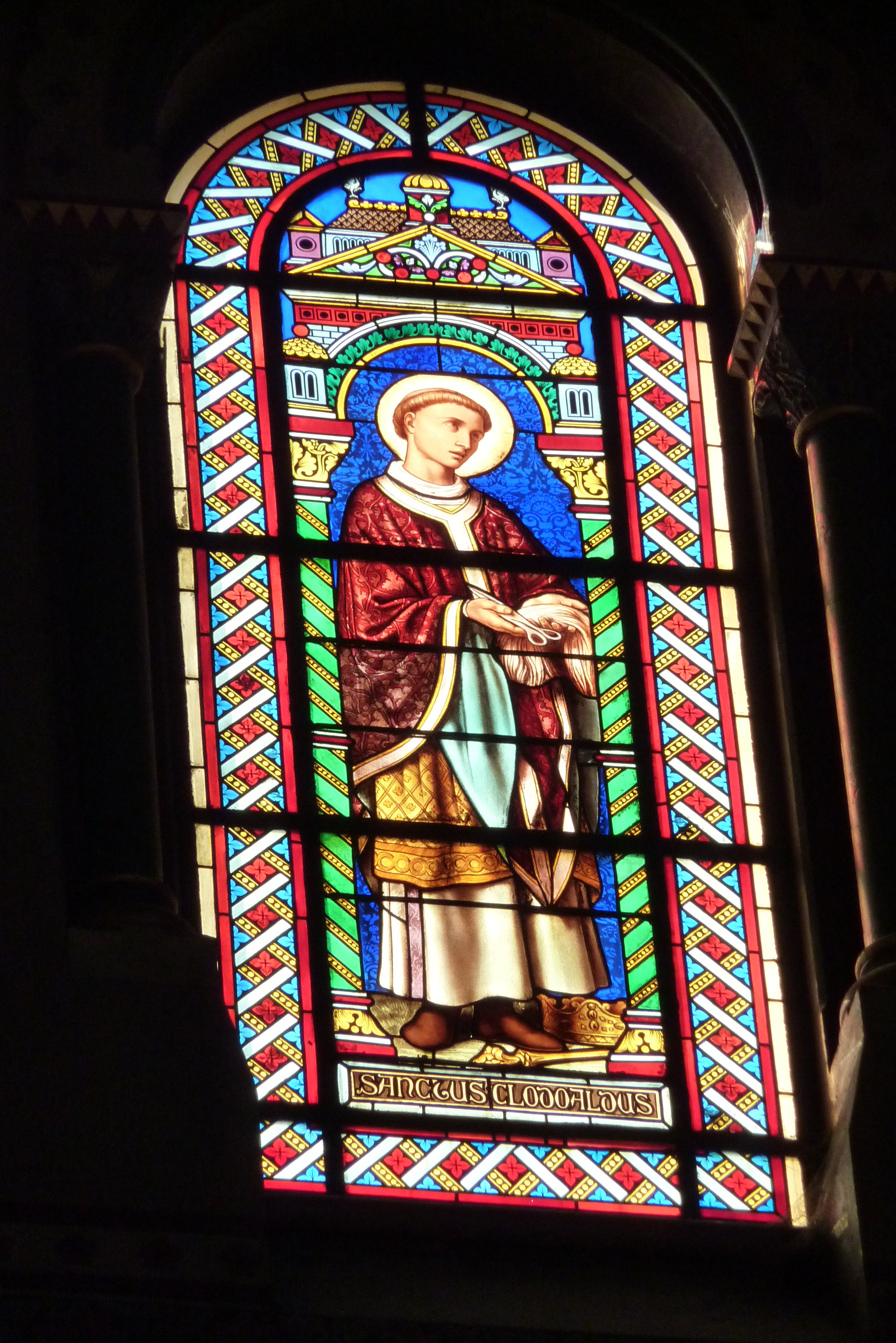
Saint Cloud (Clodoald).

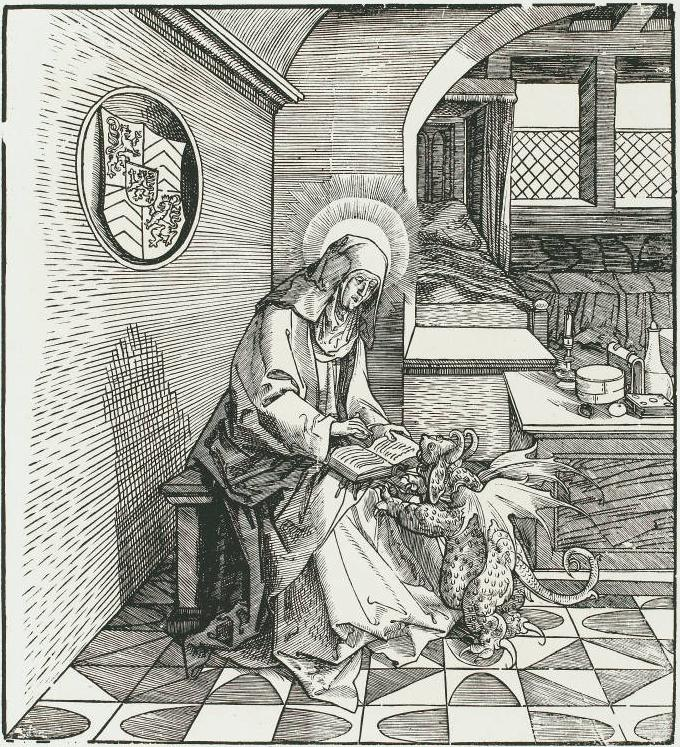
St. Madalberta, Abbess of Maubeuge Abbey.

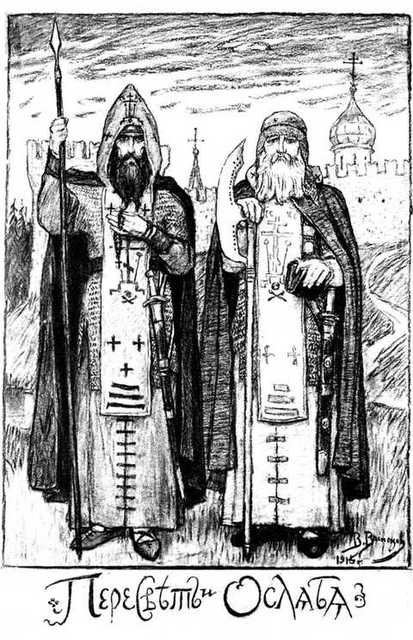
Sts. Alexander (Peresvet) and Andrew (Oslyabya), disciples of St. Sergius of Radonezh.

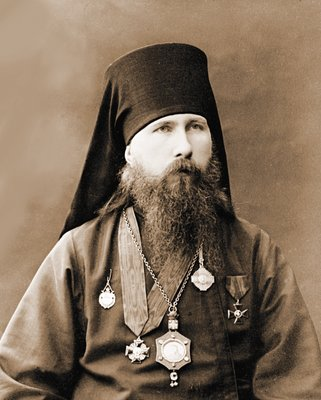
New Hieromartyr Eugene (Zernov), Metropolitan of Nizhny Novgorod (Gorky).

== Sources ==
- September 7/September 20. Orthodox Calendar (PRAVOSLAVIE.RU).
- September 20 / September 7. HOLY TRINITY RUSSIAN ORTHODOX CHURCH (A parish of the Patriarchate of Moscow).
- September 7. OCA - The Lives of the Saints.
- The Autonomous Orthodox Metropolia of Western Europe and the Americas (ROCOR). St. Hilarion Calendar of Saints for the year of our Lord 2004. St. Hilarion Press (Austin, TX). p. 67.
- The Seventh Day of the Month of September. Orthodoxy in China.
- September 7. Latin Saints of the Orthodox Patriarchate of Rome.
- The Roman Martyrology. Transl. by the Archbishop of Baltimore. Last Edition, According to the Copy Printed at Rome in 1914. Revised Edition, with the Imprimatur of His Eminence Cardinal Gibbons. Baltimore: John Murphy Company, 1916. pp. 274–275.
- Rev. Richard Stanton. A Menology of England and Wales, or, Brief Memorials of the Ancient British and English Saints Arranged According to the Calendar, Together with the Martyrs of the 16th and 17th Centuries. London: Burns & Oates, 1892. pp. 437–440.

Greek Sources

- Great Synaxaristes: (in Greek) 7 ΣΕΠΤΕΜΒΡΙΟΥ. ΜΕΓΑΣ ΣΥΝΑΞΑΡΙΣΤΗΣ.
- (in Greek) Συναξαριστής. 7 Σεπτεμβρίου. ECCLESIA.GR. (H ΕΚΚΛΗΣΙΑ ΤΗΣ ΕΛΛΑΔΟΣ).
- (in Greek) 07/09/2026. Ορθόδοξος Συναξαριστής.

Russian Sources

- (in Russian) 20 сентября (7 сентября). Православная Энциклопедия под редакцией Патриарха Московского и всея Руси Кирилла (электронная версия). (Orthodox Encyclopedia - Pravenc.ru).
- (in Russian) 7 сентября по старому стилю / 20 сентября по новому стилю. Русская Православная Церковь - Православный церковный календарь на 2026 год.
