= April 9 (Eastern Orthodox liturgics) =

Day in the Eastern Orthodox liturgical calendar

Eastern Orthodox liturgical calendar
April 8	April 9	April 10
April 9 O.S. ≍ April 22 N.S. April 9 N.S ≍ March 27 O.S.

An Eastern Orthodox cross

April 9 in Eastern Orthodox liturgical calendars is a feast day and a day of commemoration of saints and martyrs. Although some Orthodox churches use the Revised Julian Calendar and others use the traditional Julian calendar, the fixed commemorations for their respective April 9 are broadly the same, no matter which calendar is used. (Note: Despite the dates being the same, the days to which they refer typically differ by 13 days. The notation Old Style or O.S. is sometimes used to indicate a date in the traditional Julian Calendar (the "Old Calendar"). The notation New Style or N.S. indicates a date in the Revised Julian calendar (the "New Calendar").)

== Saints ==
- Martyrs Fortunatus, Donatus, twelve virgins, and six laymen, at Sirmium (304)
- Martyr Eupsychius of Caesarea in Cappadocia (362) (Note: "At Caesarea, in Cappadocia, St. Eupsychius, martyr, who suffered martyrdom under Julian the Apostate, for having overthrown the temple of Fortune.")
- Hieromartyrs Desan the Bishop, the Priest Mariabus, Martyr Abdiesus and 270 others, martyrs of Persia under Shapur II (362)
- Venerable Hieromartyr Bademus (Vadim), Archimandrite, of Persia, and 7 disciples (379)
- Venerable Acacius of Amida, Bishop of Amida in Mesopotamia (5th century) (Note: "At Amida, in Mesopotamia, St. Acatius, bishop, who melted and sold even the sacred vessels in order to ransom captives.")

== Pre-Schism Western saints ==
- Martyrs of Pannonia, seven virgin-martyrs in Sirmium in Pannonia. (Note: "At Sirmium, seven holy virgins and martyrs, who purchased eternal life together, at the price of their own blood.")
- Martyrs of North-West Africa, a group of Christians martyred in Masyla. (Note: "In Africa, the holy Massylitan martyrs, on whose birthday St. Augustine delivered a discourse.")
- Saint Marcellus, Bishop of Die, celebrated for miracles (474) (Note: Born in Avignon in France, he succeeded his own brother St Petronius as Bishop of Die. He suffered much from the Arians.)
- Saint Madrun (Materiana), a saint from Wales or Cornwall to whom some Welsh churches are dedicated (5th century)
- Saint Dotto, Abbot of a monastery in the Orkney Islands off the coast of Scotland (6th century)
- Saint Waltrude (Woutruide, Waldetrudis, Vaudru), monastic foundress at Bergen (Netherlands), renowned for holiness of life and miracles (688) (Note: Daughter of Sts Walbert IV and Bertilia, wife of St Vincent Madelgarus and mother of Sts Landericus, Dentelin, Madelberta and Aldetrudis. When her husband became a monk she founded a convent and became a nun. The town of Mons in Belgium grew up around the convent.)
- Saint Hugh of Rouen (Hugh of Champagne), Bishop of Rouen and then of Paris, and was also Abbot of Fontenelle and Jumièges (730)
- Saint Hedda and Companions, Abbot of Peterborough in England, martyred by the Danes (869) (Note: He and eighty-four monks of his monastery were martyred by the Danes.)
- Saint Theodore and Companions, Abbot of Crowland in England, martyred by the Danes (869) (Note: Theodore was Abbot of Crowland in England and he and his monks were martyred by the Danes. Besides the abbot, several others were mentioned by name: Askega and Swethin, Elfgete, a deacon, Sabinus, a subdeacon, Egdred and Ulric, and also Grimkeld and Agamund, both centenarians.)
- Saint Casilda of Toledo, an anchoress near Briviesca near Burgos (1050) (Note: Born in Toledo, she was of Moorish parentage. She became Orthodox and led the life of an anchoress near Briviesca near Burgos. She was greatly venerated throughout Spain.)

== Post-Schism Orthodox saints ==
- Newly Revealed Martyrs Raphael (Archimandrite), Nicholas (Deacon), Irene (child), and Eleni (who was also called Susanna) of Lesbos, and those with them (1463) (Note: Saints Raphael, Nicholas, and Irene (and those with them) are also commemorated on Bright Tuesday. Name days celebrated today include: Raphael (Ραφαήλ); Raphaela (Ραφαηλία).)
- Hieromartyr Misael, Archbishop of Ryazan and Murom (1655) (Note: See: (in Russian) Мисаил (архиепископ Рязанский). Википедии. (Russian Wikipedia).)

=== New martyrs and confessors ===
- New Martyr Gabriel Fomin (1942)

== Other commemorations ==
- Translation of the holy relics of Saint Monica of Tagaste to Rome. (Note: "At Rome, the translation of the body of St. Monica, mother of the blessed bishop Augustine, which was brought from Ostia to Rome, under the Sovereign Pontiff, Martin V., and with due honors buried in the Church of St. Augustine." Her feast day is celebrated on May 4.)

== Icon gallery ==
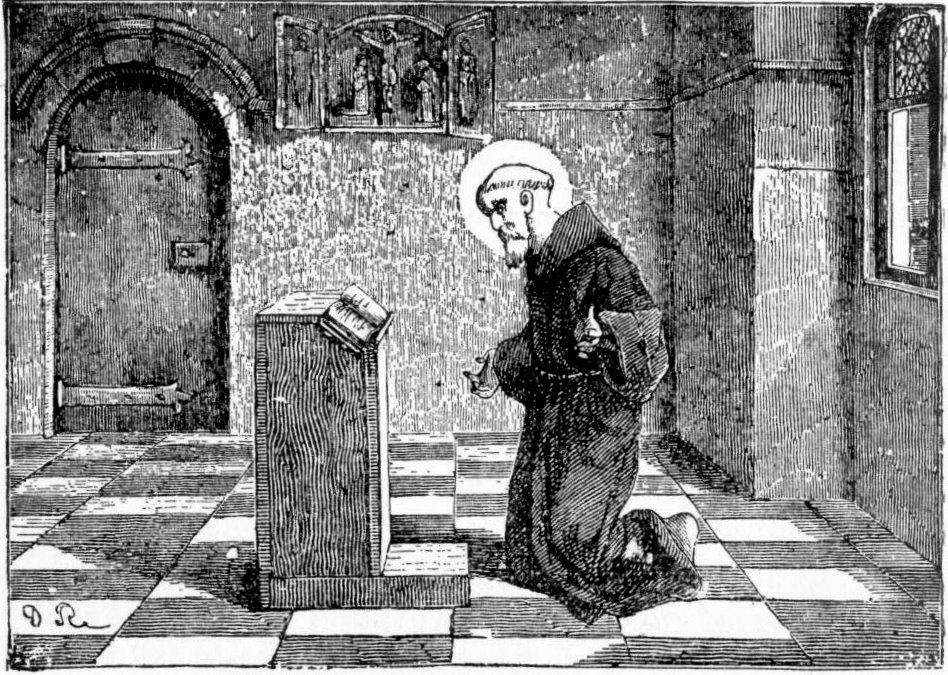
St Bademus (Little Pictorial Lives of the Saints, 1878)

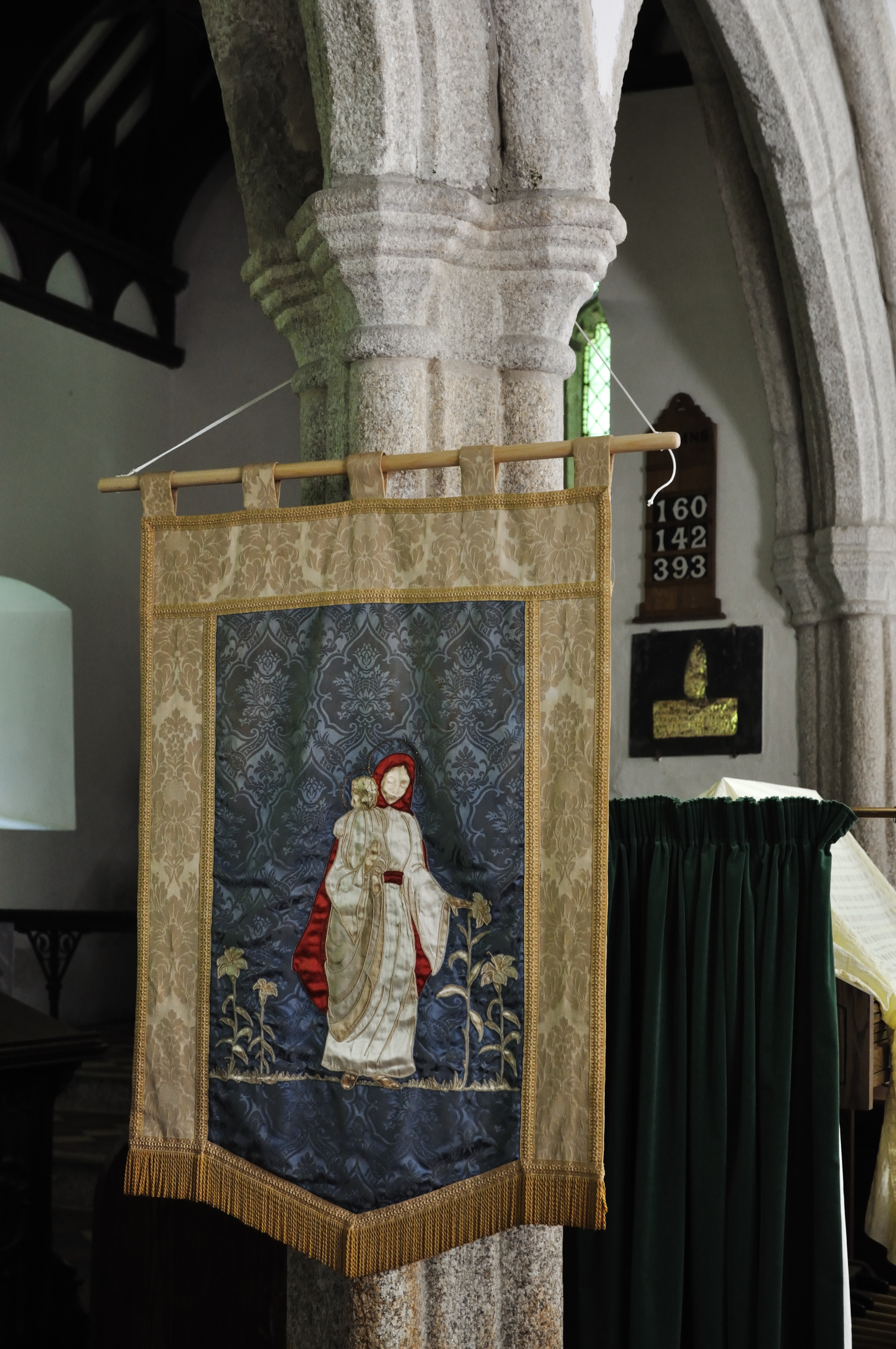
St Materiana depicted on the church banner at Minster, Cornwall.

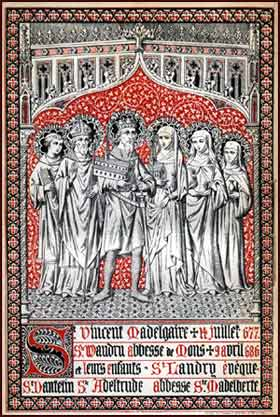
St. Waltrude and family.

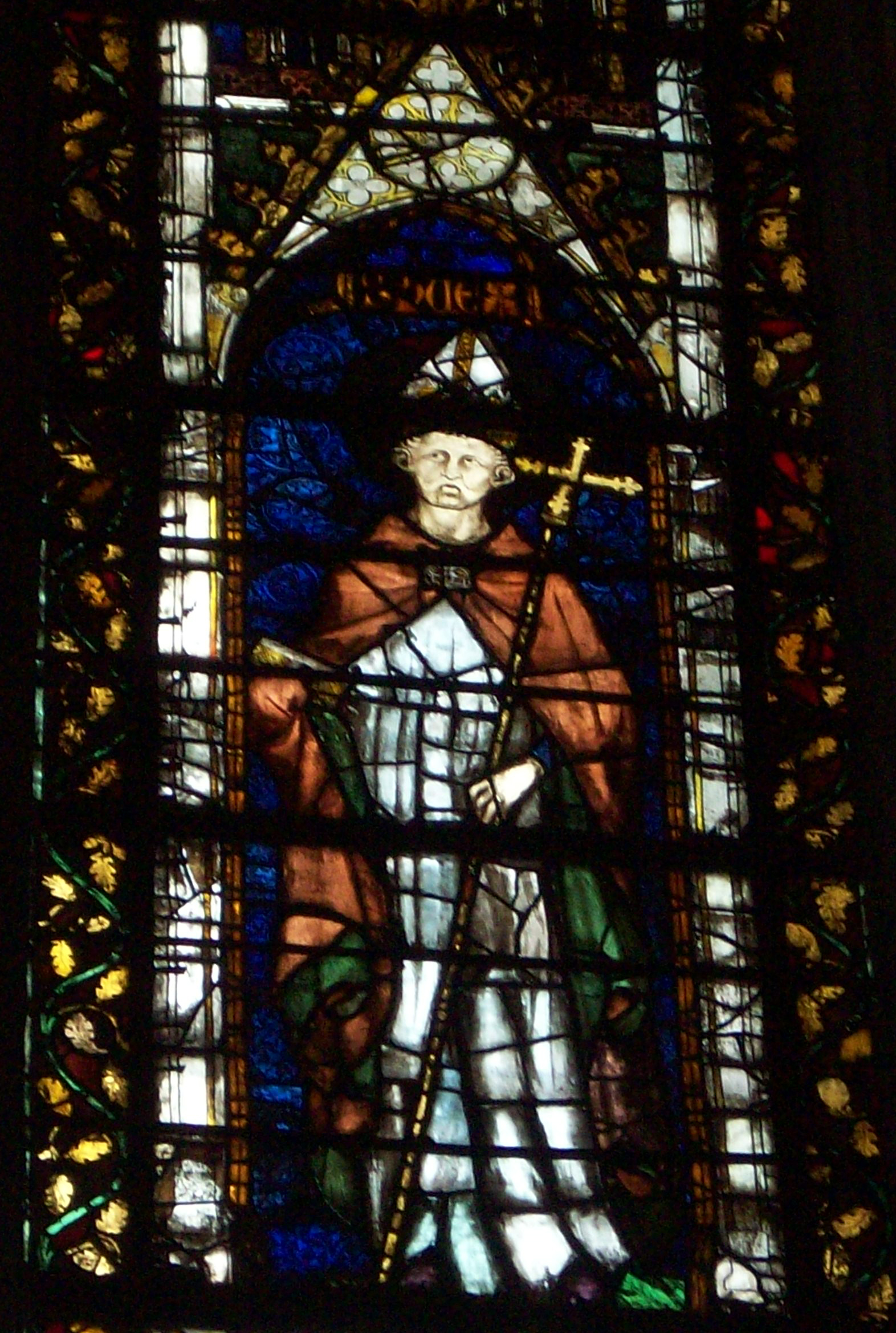
Saint Hugh of Rouen.

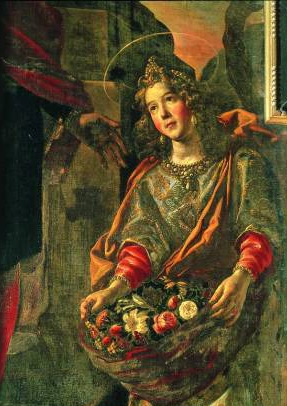
St Casilda of Toledo (Catedral de Burgos)

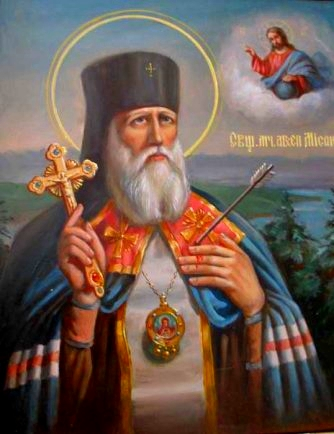
Hieromartyr Misael, Archbishop of Ryazan and Murom.

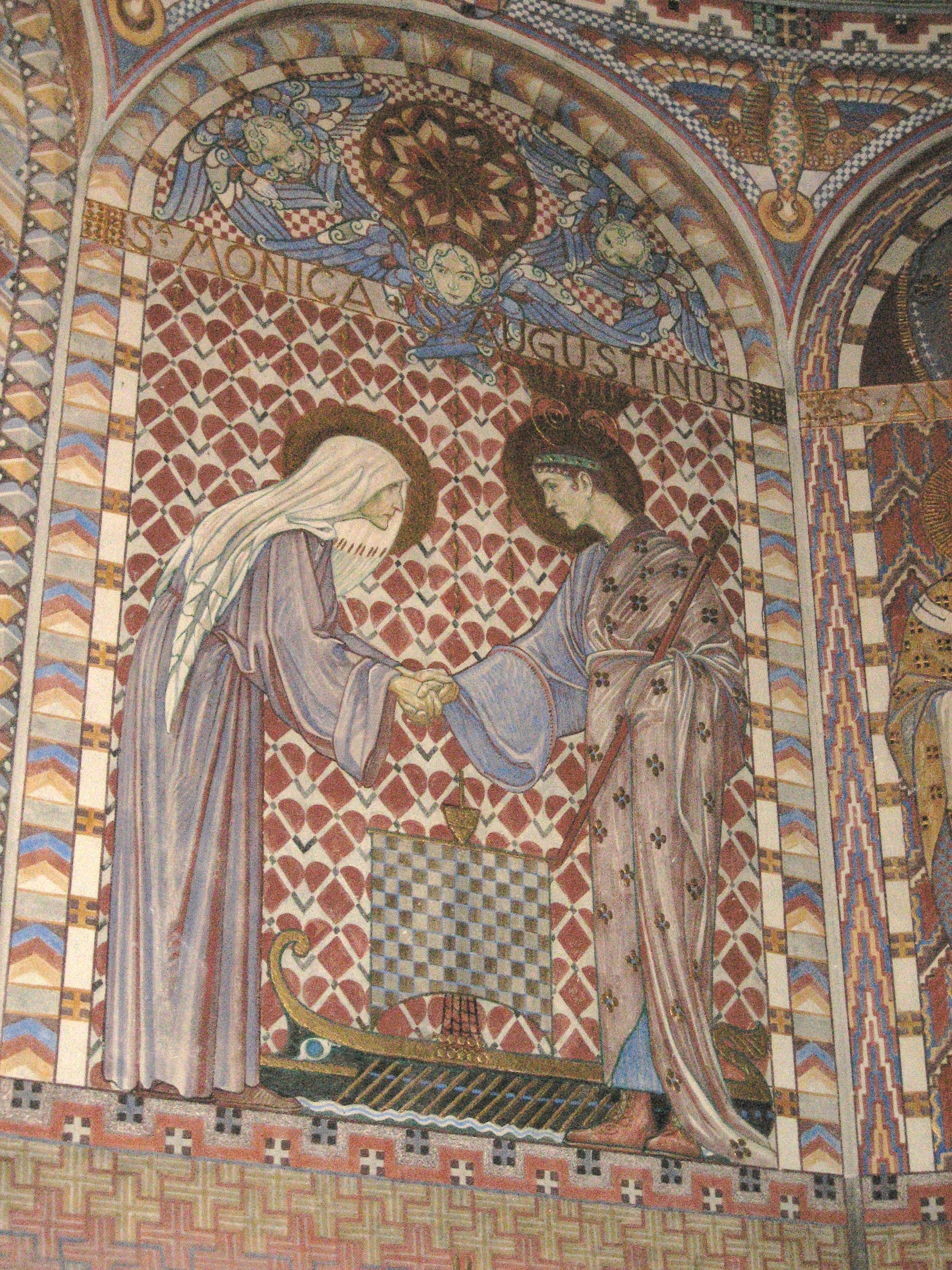
St Monica and Saint Augustine (by Olle Hjortzberg).

== Sources ==
- April 9 / April 22. Orthodox Calendar (pravoslavie.ru).
- April 22 / April 9. Holy Trinity Russian Orthodox Church (A parish of the Patriarchate of Moscow).
- April 9. OCA - The Lives of the Saints.
- The Autonomous Orthodox Metropolia of Western Europe and the Americas. St. Hilarion Calendar of Saints for the year of our Lord 2004. St. Hilarion Press (Austin, TX). p. 27.
- April 9. Latin Saints of the Orthodox Patriarchate of Rome.
- The Roman Martyrology. Transl. by the Archbishop of Baltimore. Last Edition, According to the Copy Printed at Rome in 1914. Revised Edition, with the Imprimatur of His Eminence Cardinal Gibbons. Baltimore: John Murphy Company, 1916. p. 100.
- Rev. Richard Stanton. A Menology of England and Wales, or, Brief Memorials of the Ancient British and English Saints Arranged According to the Calendar, Together with the Martyrs of the 16th and 17th Centuries. London: Burns & Oates, 1892. pp. 150–151.

Greek Sources

- Great Synaxaristes: (in Greek) 9 Απριλίου. Μεγασ Συναξαριστησ.
- (in Greek) Συναξαριστής. 9 Απριλίου. ecclesia.gr. (H Εκκλησια Τησ Ελλαδοσ).

Russian Sources

- (in Russian) 22 апреля (9 апреля). Православная Энциклопедия под редакцией Патриарха Московского и всея Руси Кирилла (электронная версия). (Orthodox Encyclopedia - Pravenc.ru).
- (in Russian) 9 апреля (ст.ст.) 22 апреля 2013 (нов. ст.). Русская Православная Церковь Отдел внешних церковных связей.
