= Kition =

Ancient city-kingdom of Cyprus

Coordinates: 34.9233°N 33.6305°E

Kition 𐤊𐤕 or 𐤊𐤕𐤉 Κίτιον
- 12th century BC–342 AD
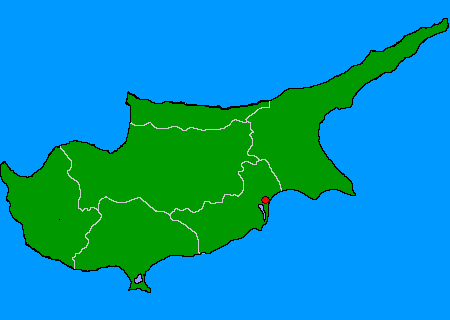
- Location of Kition
- Capital: Kition
- Common languages: Greek and Phoenician
- Religion: Ancient Greek religion/Ancient Canaanite religion
- Government: Petty kingdom
- Historical era: Classical Antiquity
  - Established: 12th century BC
  - Disestablished: 342 AD
- Currency: Stater, obol
- Today part of: Cyprus

k A Z1 TA Z1 H_SPACE N17 Z1 N21 xAst
kꜣṯꜣj
in hieroglyphs
Era: New Kingdom
(1550–1069 BC)

Kition (Ancient Greek: Κίτιον, Kition; Latin: Citium; Egyptian: kꜣṯꜣj; Phoenician: 𐤊𐤕, kt, or 𐤊𐤕𐤉, kty;) was an ancient city-kingdom of the island of Cyprus, on the southern coast of the island in present-day Larnaca. It was established by Phoenicians in the beginning of the 10th century BC.

Kition's name may come from the Phoenician 𐤊𐤕𐤉 (kty, pronounced "Kitiya"). This name was borrowed into Ancient Greek as Kítion (Κίτιον) and thence into Latin as Citium.

== History ==
During the Late Bronze Age, the area was settled by Mycenaean Greeks who exploited the local copper deposits. This settlement was destroyed around 1200 BC but was rebuilt soon after.

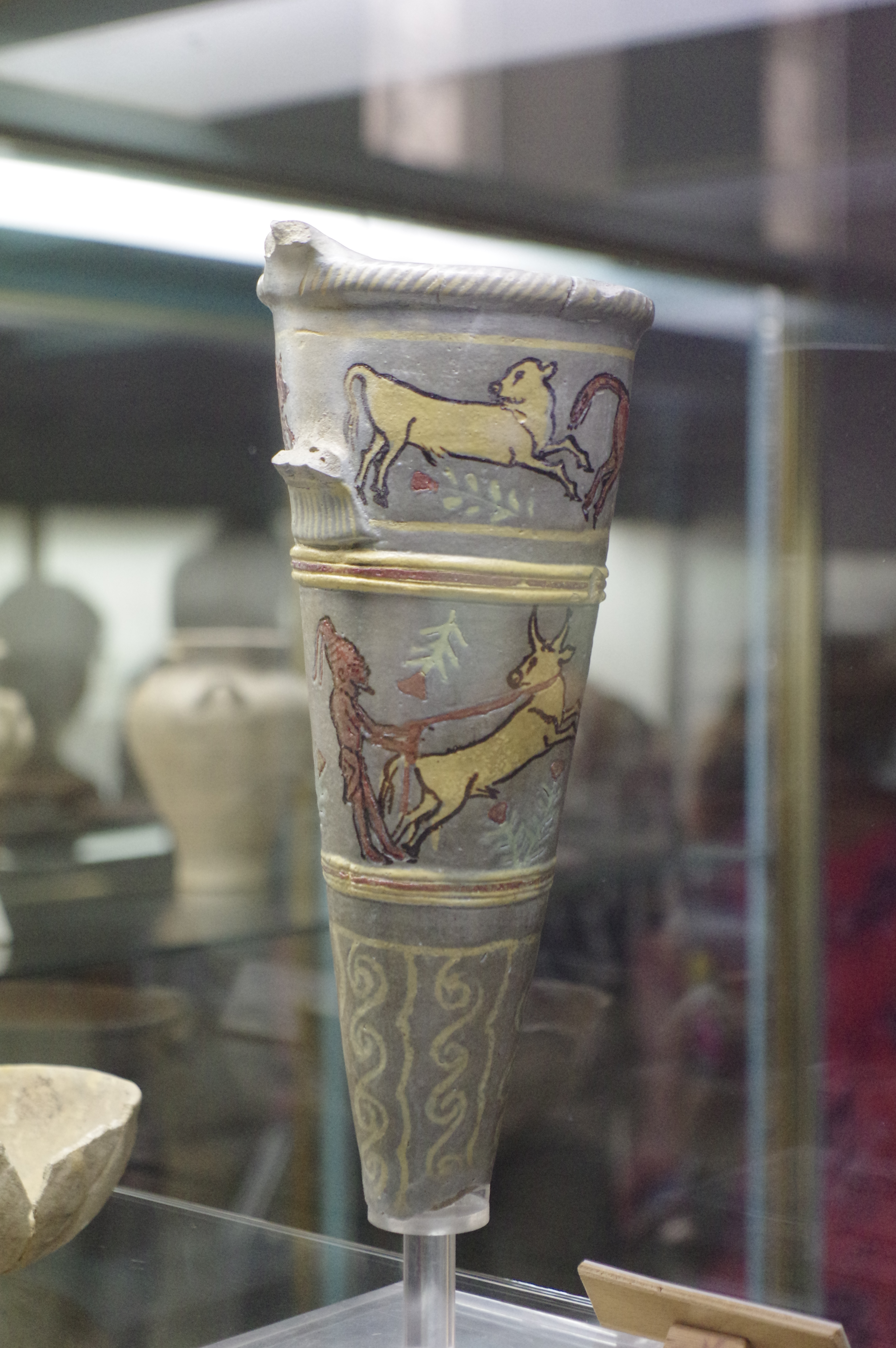
Faience rhyton with enamel inlay, 13th c. BC, Nicosia museum

The new town was rebuilt on a larger scale; its mudbrick city wall was replaced by a cyclopean wall. Around 1000 BC, the religious part of the city was abandoned, although life seems to have continued in other areas as indicated by finds in tombs.

Map showing the ancient city-kingdoms of Cyprus

Literary evidence suggests an early Phoenician presence at Kition under Tyrian rule at the beginning of the 10th century BC. Some Phoenician merchants who were believed to come from Tyre colonized the area and expanded the political influence of Kition. After c. 850 BC, the city's sanctuaries were rebuilt and reused by Phoenician settlers.

The kingdom was under Egyptian domination from 570 to 545 BC. Persia ruled Cyprus from 545 BC. Kings of the city are referred to by name from 500 BC—in Phoenician texts and as inscriptions on coins.

Marguerite Yon claims that literary texts and inscriptions suggest that by the Classical period Kition was one of the principal local powers, along with its neighbour Salamis. In 499 BC Cypriot kingdoms (including Kition) joined Ionia's revolt against Persia. Persian rule of Cyprus ended in 332 BC.

Ptolemy I conquered Cyprus in 312 BC and killed Poumyathon, the Phoenician king of Kition, and burned the temples. Shortly afterwards the Cypriot city-kingdoms were dissolved and the Phoenician dynasty of Kition was abolished. Following these events the area lost its religious character.

The community of Kitian merchants in Athens asked and received from the Athenian authorities in 333/332 BC permission to own a plot of land (probably in Peiraeus) and build on it a temple for Aphrodite (Astarte). The permission is recorded on a stele that contains the official decision (probably erected by the Kitian themselves); in addition, an inscription dedicated by "Aristoklea of Kition to Aphrodite Urania", which probably originated in this temple, was found in Attica.

Cyprus was annexed by the Roman Republic in 58 BC.

Strong earthquakes hit the city in 76 AD and the year after, but the city seems to have been prosperous during Roman times. A curator civitatis, or financial administrator of the city, was sent to Kition from Rome during the rule of Septimius Severus.

The city was destroyed by successive earthquakes in 322 and 342 AD, which also destroyed Salamis and Pafos.

== The Kition archaeological sites ==
Kition was first systematically excavated by the Swedish Cyprus Archaeological Expedition (under the direction of Einar Gjerstad) from October 1929 until April 1930.

Kition. The cult room. Statues in situ. Some depict Herakles-Melqart and are probably from the Sub Archaic Style - Early Cypro-Classical I, ca 480-450 B.C.

The ruins can be found within the borders of the modern town of Larnaca. The ancient city was surrounded by massive walls which can still be traced today. At the Bamboula hill, in the northeastern part of the city, was the acropolis. Here, the Swedish archaeologists discovered a sanctuary dedicated to Heracles-Melqart. Between the acropolis and the modern seashore was the ancient harbour. In 1879 the Government of Cyprus filled this marshy area with soil from the upper strata of the Bamboula Hill because they wished to get rid of the mosquitos which transmitted malaria. Because of this the Bamboula Hill and especially the upper layers of the acropolis were much disturbed. A small part of the city was excavated as early as 1894 by British archeologists.

The Swedish archaeologists attempted a stratigraphic examination of the Bamboula mound to obtain information about the dating of the Phoenician colonization of Cyprus. They wanted to study the ceramic development and collect archaeological material to explain how the Phoenicians affected the development of the Cypriote culture. But, after three days of digging, they found a large deposit of sculptures and needed to enlarge the excavation.

The excavation of Kition. The rectangular base of a statue, the statue itself is missing.

According to The Swedish Cyprus Expedition, the acropolis began as a settlement from the end of the Late Cypriote II and the beginning of Cypro Geometric I period before it became a sanctuary. Throughout the time of the Cypro-Archaic I something changed, and Kition began to be used as an open-air sanctuary. The Swedish Expedition did not find any votive sculptures from this early stage, therefore the votives might have been of a different kind or removed to a place outside the excavation. They did find a rectangular base of a statue called no. 560. The statue itself was missing with only the feet preserved. This sculpture was probably large and could have been Kition's cult statue. Later, the cult erected a rectangular altar made of rubble and chips of stone in front of the statue.

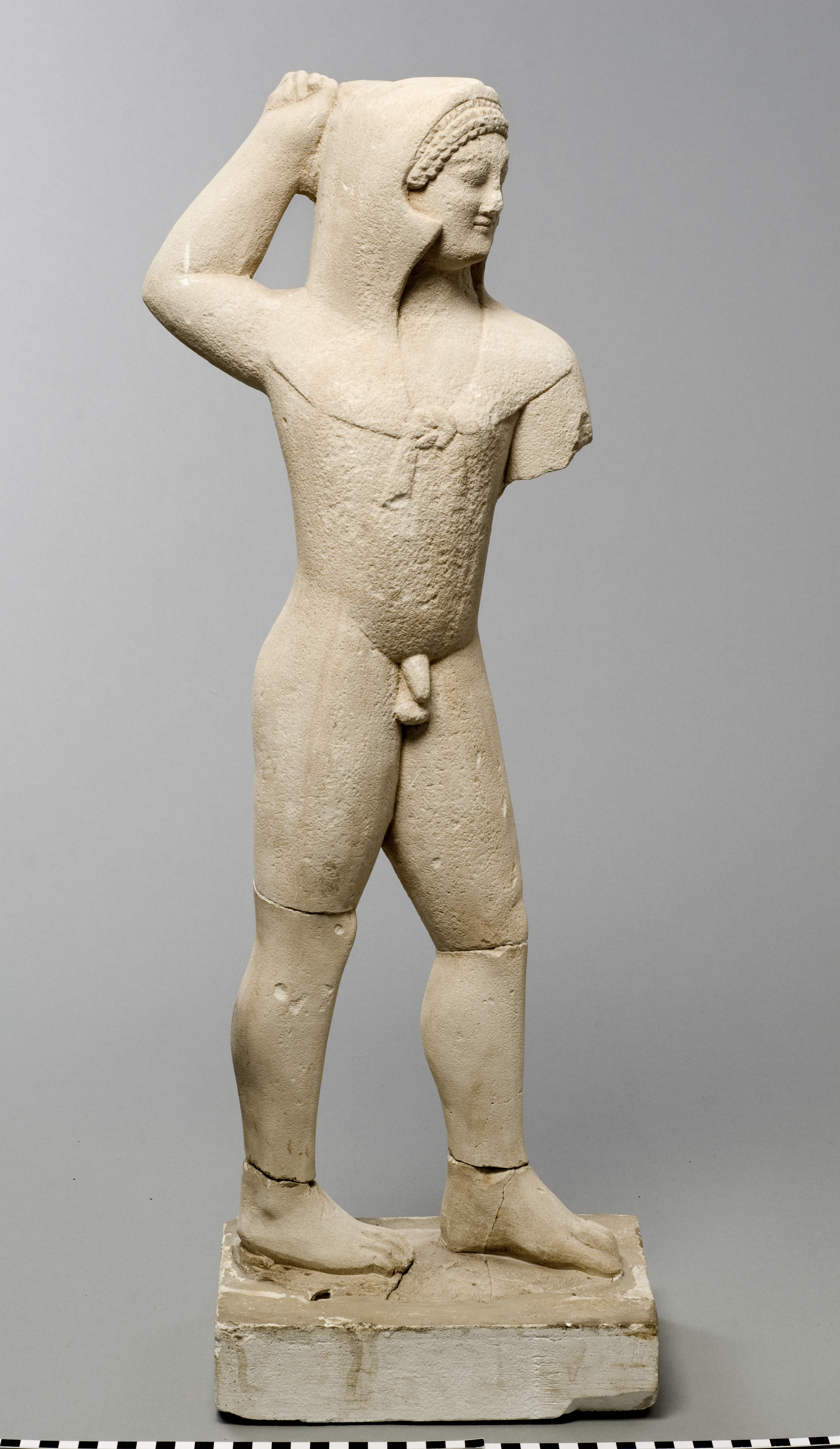
Herakles or Herakles Melqart statue standing on a rectangular base with legs and head shown in profile, torso en face. Nude except for lionskin with paws knotted on the chest. Head of lionskin with teeth resting on Herakles’ head which has notched hair over forehead. Left arm raised with fist attached to the back of the head (formerly holding a club, now missing). Almond-shaped eyes and a faint smile. The back is roughly worked. From Kition. Can be seen at Medelhavsmuseet.

The temenos were in use until the end of the Cypro-Archaic II period when a new temenos was built on top of the old one. This temenos was enclosed by a massive peribolos wall. Furthermore, it seems like an inner temenos was created at the same place as the earlier walls had been. Within the inner temenos a low altar consisting of a square was found, as well as another pillar altar outside. Both on the altar itself and close to it the archaeologists found remains of ash and carbonized matter. All through the periods votive gifts, mainly consisting of sculptures, were placed in the sanctuary, and each time the level was raised the sculptures were transferred to the new sanctuary. Throughout the Cypro-Classic I period, the temenos were rearranged entirely and became more monumental. This sanctuary was the last one before the sanctuary was demolished in the Hellenistic period and secular buildings were erected in the same place. During the demolition, all the votive sculptures were buried, and the place was no longer used for sacred purposes. The Hellenistic house was divided into two parts and inside archaeologists found remains of a basalt press for pressing wine or oil, as well as rectangular drainage outlets and a storage vessel.

During the excavation, they found no inscriptions that could inform us to whom this sanctuary was dedicated. Most of the sculptures dressed in lion's skin and a club in the right hand, are a Cypriot variety of Heracles, which the Phoenicians identified with their god Melqart, the patron god of Kition. Therefore, the archaeologists concluded that the sanctuary was dedicated to the city god of Kition, Heracles-Melqart.

Einar Gjerstad explains the reason why the temenos were never rebuilt as a consequence of the last king of Kition, Pumiatihon. Pumiatihon sided with Antigonus in the struggle between him and Ptolemy I Soter. He lost his life and throne which meant that Kition ceased to be an independent state after Ptolemy's conquest of Kition in 312 BC and since the temple was the religious sign of the political independence of Kition it couldn't be rebuilt after the conquest.

Archaeology is continuing near the Kathari site. A 20 m (66 ft) long Roman mosaic showing the labours of Hercules was discovered in a baths building in 2016. It was found under Kyriakou Matsi Street when clearing a sewer and is expected to be transferred to the museum.

=== Kathari site (a.k.a. Area II) ===
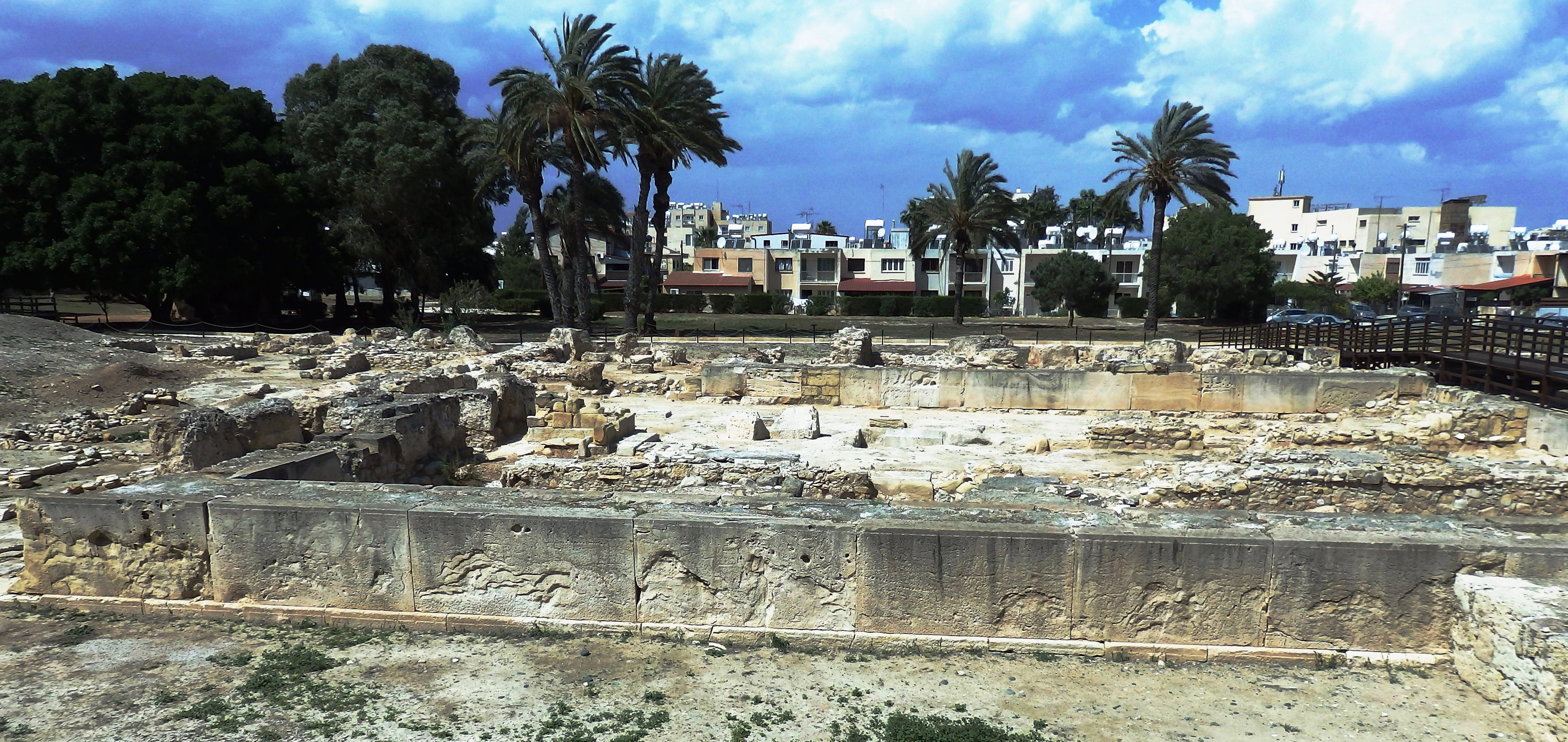
Large Temple, Kathari, Kition

This Kathari site is located around 500 metres (1,600 ft) north of the Bamboula site and is sometimes referred to as "Kition Area II". The Department of Antiquities (under the direction of Vassos Karageorghis) started excavating in 1959 continuing until 1981.

Excavations have revealed part of a defensive wall, dating from the 13th century BC and remains of five temples including cyclopean walls. The largest temple's (horizontal) dimensions were 35 by 22 m (115 by 72 ft). and was built using ashlar blocks. Temple (2) was rebuilt—around 1200 BC. Temple (1) has Late Bronze Age graffiti of ships on the façade of the south wall.

=== Bamboula site ===
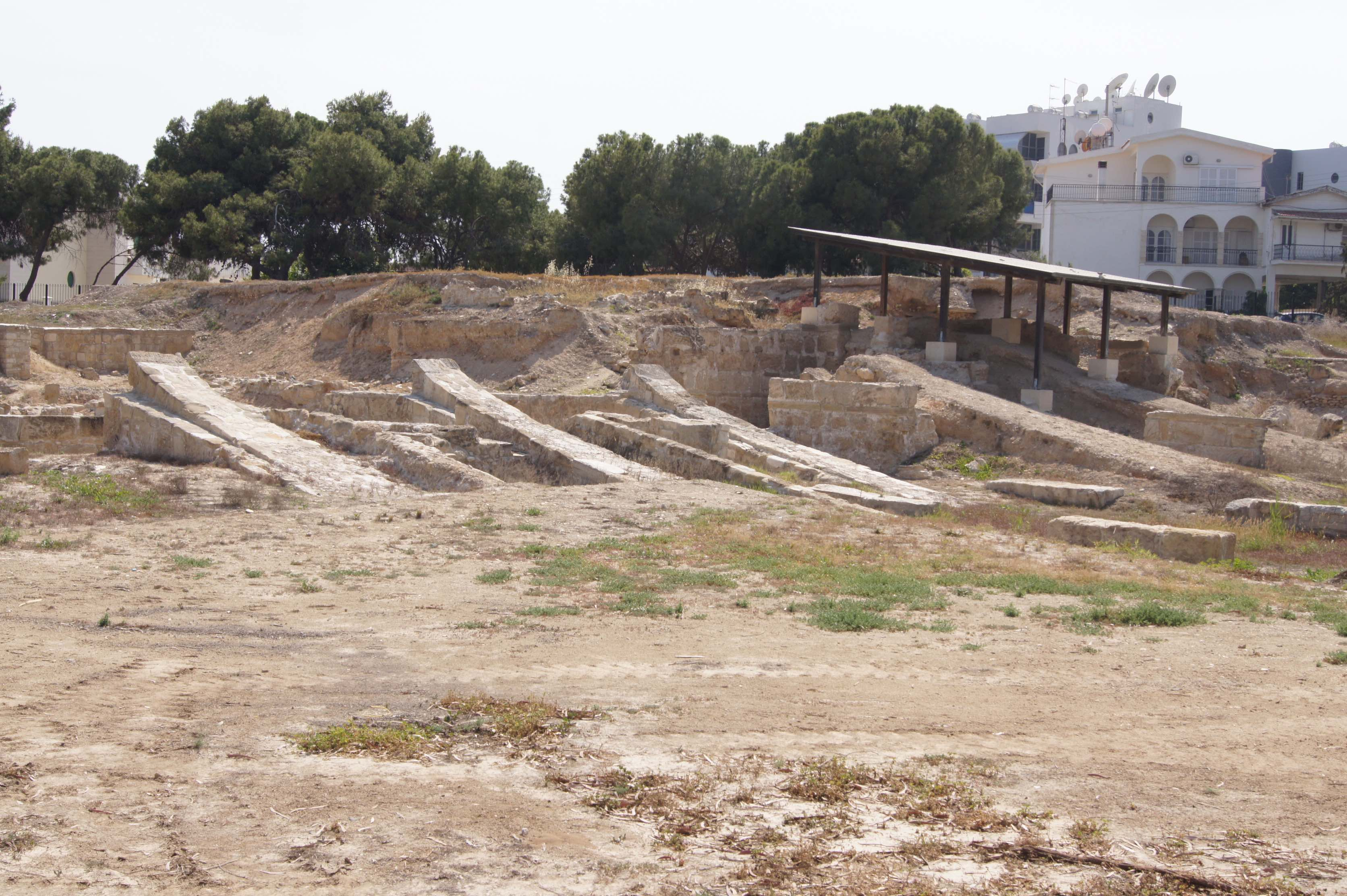
Phoenician shipyard, Bamboula, Kition

The Bamboula site is located around 50 metres (160 ft) north of the Larnaca Museum. In 1845 the Sargon Stele was found here, together with a gilded silver plakette now in the Louvre.

A British Expedition first excavated the site in 1913.

A French team from the University of Lyon started excavating in 1976. when traces of settlement dating to the tenth century BC were found along ramparts next to the port at Bamboula. The site also consists of a sanctuary of Astarte and a sanctuary of Melkart. The earliest sanctuary was built in the 9th century BC.

1987 saw the discovery of the Phoenician harbour for warships built in the 5th century BC. In its final stage, it consisted of ship sheds (six of them have been recorded), 6 metres (20 ft) wide and about 38 to 39 metres (125 to 128 ft) long, with shipways on which triremes were pulled up to dry under tiled roofs

=== Other archaeological sites at Kition ===
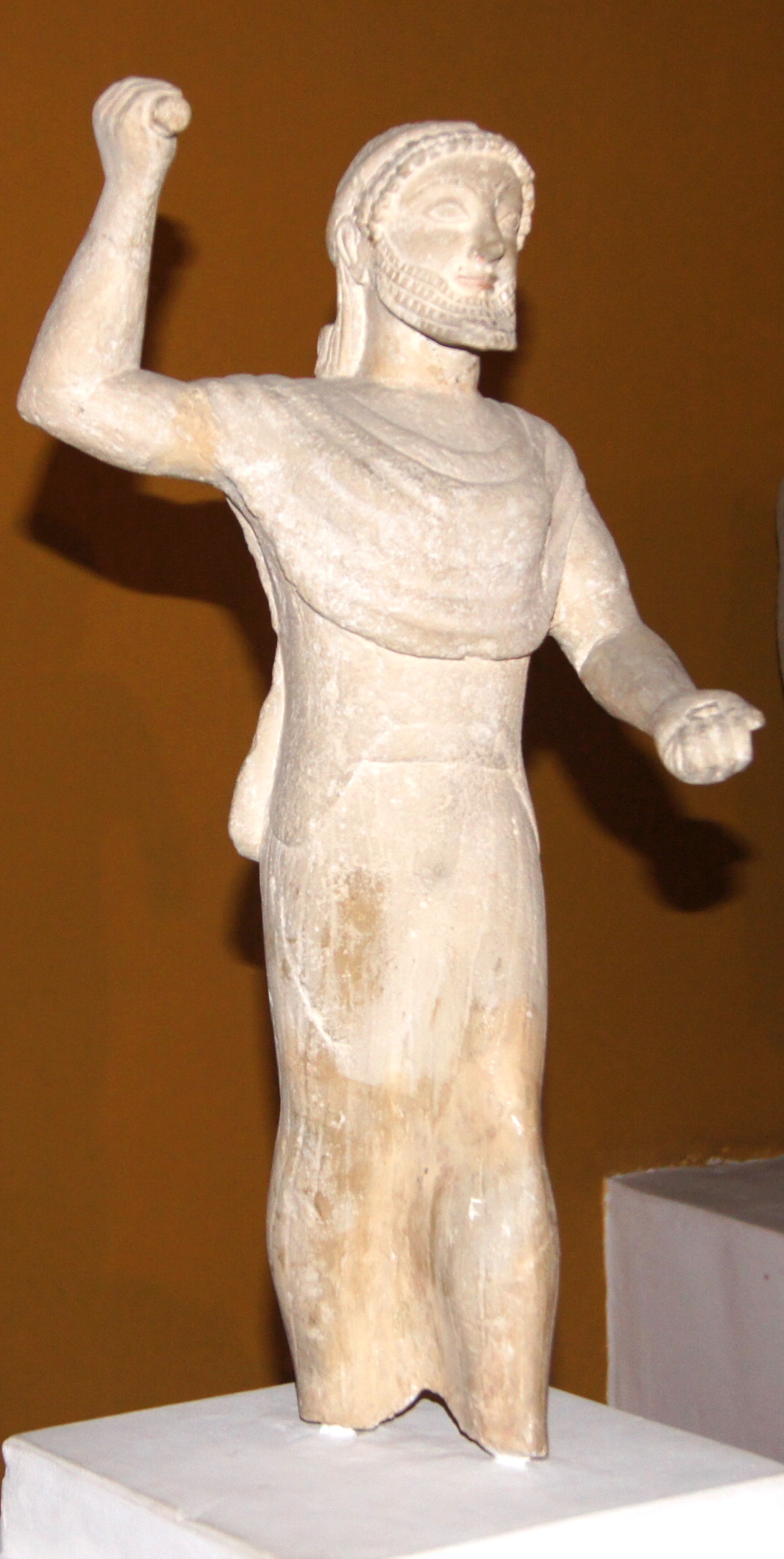
Zeus Keraunios, 500-480 BC, Nicosia museum

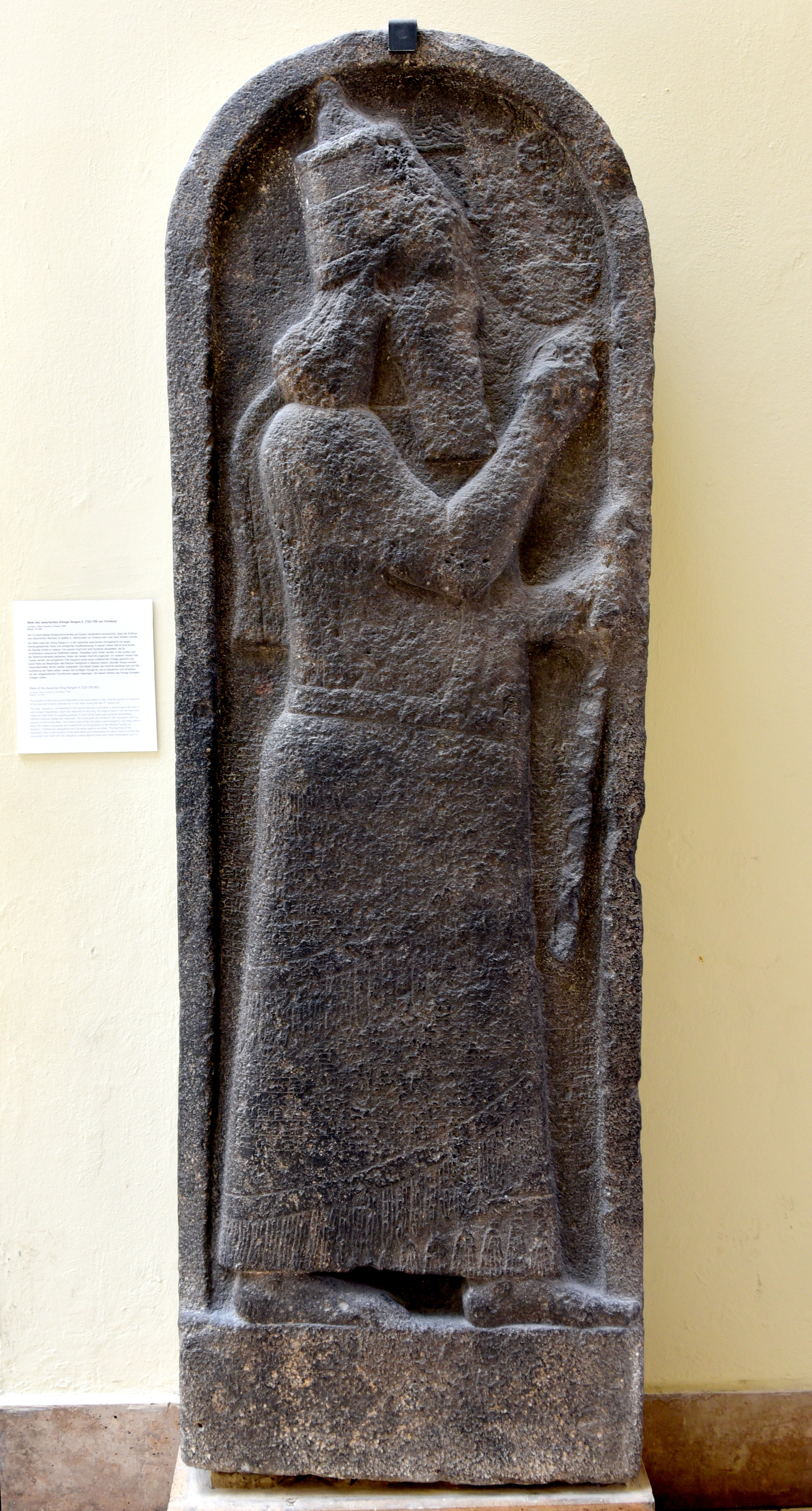
The Sargon Stele

Five built tombs, or hypogea, have been discovered at Kition: the Vangelis Tomb, Godham's Tomb, the Phaneromeni, and the Turabi Tekke Tomb. Two important stele with inscriptions in the Phoenician script were found in the Turabi Tekke cemetery in the late nineteenth century. They are now in the British Museum's collection.

Kition Area I, "close to the west [city] wall of the Pre-Phoenician period, seems to have been a residential area" according to architectural and moveable finds. "Kition Area III" and "-IV" are names of other archaeological sites at Kition.

The "mound gate" in the city wall was located in the vicinity northwest of the Phaneromeni Tomb.

The site includes a sprawling necropolis which includes the Mnemata Site and Agios Georgios Kontou cemetery. Including burials from a number of periods, it is one of the most studied necropoleis in Cyprus.

== See also ==
- Enkomi
- History of Cyprus
- Idalium
- Kourion
- Lefkaritis Tomb
- List of cities of the ancient Near East
- Ten city-kingdoms of Cyprus
- Zeno of Citium
