= September 8 (Eastern Orthodox liturgics) =

Day in the Eastern Orthodox liturgical calendar

Eastern Orthodox liturgical calendar
September 7	September 8	September 9
September 8 O.S. ≍ September 21 N.S. September 8 N.S ≍ August 26 O.S.

The Nativity of Our Most Holy Lady the Theotokos and Ever-Virgin Mary. (Saint Titus Cathedral, Heraklion, Crete).

September 8 in Eastern Orthodox liturgical calendars is a feast day and a day of commemoration of saints and martyrs. Although some Orthodox churches use the Revised Julian Calendar and others use the traditional Julian calendar, the fixed commemorations for their respective September 8 are broadly the same, no matter which calendar is used. (Note: Despite the dates being the same, the days to which they refer typically differ by 13 days. The notation Old Style or O.S. is sometimes used to indicate a date in the traditional Julian Calendar (the "Old Calendar"). The notation New Style or N.S. indicates a date in the Revised Julian calendar (the "New Calendar").)

== Feasts ==
- The Nativity of Our Most Holy Lady the Theotokos and Ever-Virgin Mary. (Note: KONDAK, TONE 4: "Joachim and Anna were freed from the reproach of childlessness, Adam and Eve from the corruption of death, by your holy nativity, O Immaculate One. Your people, redeemed from the guilt of sin, celebrate by crying out to You: The barren woman gives birth to the Theotokos, the Nourisher of our Life.") (Note: "THE Nativity of the most Blessed and ever Virgin Mary, Mother of God.") (Note: "In the ancient Irish Church, the Festival of the Birth of our Divine Lord's Mother was celebrated on the eighth day of September, as we learn from the Feilire of Aengus. On this there is a short comment. About the year 695, this feast was appointed by Pope Servius. In various parts of Ireland, this festival was celebrated formerly with very special devotion, as parishes, churches and chapels had been dedicated to the Blessed Virgin Mary, and this was a favoured festival day. The patrons or patterns that until of late were yearly celebrated very conclusively attest it. In Kilnenor parish, County of Wexford, there is a holy well, at which a patron was formerly held on the 8th of September. According to a pious tradition, a concert of angels is said to have been heard in the air to solemnize the Nativity or Birthday of the Blessed Virgin Mary.")

== Saints ==
- Martyrs Rufus and Rufianus, by the sword.
- Martyr Severus, by the sword.
- Martyr Artemidorus, by the sword.
- Martyrs Eusebius, Nestablus, Zeno, and Nestor, by a mob (c. 362)

== Pre-Schism Western saints ==
- Saint Anastasius II, Pope of Rome (498) (see also: November 19)
- Saint Kingsmark (Kinemark, Cynfarch), disciple of St. Dyfrig (5th century) (Note: By tradition a saint who came from Scotland but lived in Wales, where churches are dedicated to him.)
- Saint Æthelburh of Kent (Ethelburga), daughter of King Ethelbert of Kent, who married King Edwin of Northumbria, and founded the convent of Lyminge in Kent as abbess (c. 647) (Note: As she was a Christian from Kent, her marriage to King Edwin triggered the initial phase of the conversion of the pagan north of England to Christianity.)
- Saint Disibod (Disibode, Disen), founder of Disibodenberg Abbey in Rhineland-Palatinate, Germany (c. 700) (Note: Born in Ireland, he went to Germany with several companions and founded a monastery on a hill in the valley of the Nahe near Bingen. This became known as Disibodenberg or Disenberg.)
- Saint Sergius, Pope of Rome (701) (Note: Of Syrian descent, he was born in Palermo in Sicily. He was Pope of Rome from 687 to 701. He blessed and fostered the missionary work of the English monks in Friesland and Germany.)
- Saint Corbinian, a hermit who was consecrated a Bishop and was sent as a missionary to Bavaria (c. 730) (Note: He lived for fourteen years as a hermit and then went to Rome. He was consecrated bishop and went to preach Christ in Germany. He lived in Freising in Bavaria.) (Note: "At Freisingen, St. Corbinian, first bishop of that city. Being consecrated by Pope Gregory II, and sent to preach the Gospel, he reaped an abundant harvest in France and Germany, and finally renowned for virtues and miracles, rested in peace.")
- Saint Ine of Wessex, King of Wessex, (Note: "When Ceadwalla abdicated his kingdom and retired to Rome, he was succeeded by his kinsman INA, who had a long and prosperous reign of 37 years. He was successful in his wars in Kent, East Anglia, and with the Welsh. His wisdom as a legislator is proved by the code of laws which he promulgated, and his piety by the many services he rendered to the Church. In the reign of Ina the diocese of Wessex was divided and the See of Sherborne established, of which St. Aldhelm, the King's friend and counsellor, was the first titular. He also refounded the ancient Abbey of Glastonbury, and endowed that of Malmesbury, as well as other religious houses.") (Note: Ina was King of Wessex in England from 688 till 726, and is remembered as the restorer of Glastonbury. In about 726 he abdicated and went to Rome with his wife Ethelburgh, where he ended his days as a monk.) and his wife Queen Ethelburga (c. 740) (Note: "ETHELBURGA was his faithful fellow-worker in all that was good, and she too was gifted with princely qualities. On one occasion, when the town of Taunton had fallen into the hands of rebels, and the King was engaged elsewhere, she wrested it from them and razed it to the ground. Both the King and Queen, however, found these earthly triumphs unsatisfying, and longed for something better. It was under the influence of Ethelburga that their resolution was at last taken, and they forsook their kingdom to seek for peace in a life of devotion in the holy city of Rome. It is not clear that they formally embraced the monastic life, but they laid aside their royal state and persevered in patient expectation of God's good time. Ina is the reputed founder of the English hospice and school in Rome, now represented by the venerable English College, the nursery of so many Martyrs and Missioners in later times, though some have attributed it to Offa, King of Mercia. Probably Ina was really the founder, and Offa, as well as other later kings, its munificent benefactor.")

== Post-Schism Orthodox saints ==
- Saint Serapion, monk of Spaso-Eleazar Monastery, Pskov (1481) (see also: September 7)
- Saint Lucian, Abbot, of Alexandrov (1654)
- New Martyr Athanasius of Thessaloniki (1774)
- Saint Sophronius, Bishop of Achtaleia in Iberia (Georgia) (1803) (Note: The Translation of his Relics took place in 1824, at the Monastery of St. Ioannes Vazelonos, near the Argyroupolis region of Pontus.)
- Saints Ioane (Maisuradze), Archimandrite (1957), and Giorgi-Ioane (Mkheidze), Schema-Archimandrite (1960), Confessors, of Georgia. (Note: See: (in Georgian) იოანე (მაისურაძე). ვიკიპედიაში. (Georgian Wikipedia).; (in Georgian) გიორგი (მხეიძე). ვიკიპედიაში. (Georgian Wikipedia).)

=== New martyrs and confessors ===
- New Martyr Alexander Jacobson, at Solovki (1930)
- New Martyr Demetrius, Priest (1937)

== Other commemorations ==
- Translation of the relics of St. Grimbald, Abbot of Winchester Abbey.
- Repose of Archbishop Dionysius of Ufa (1896)
- Repose of Elder Daniel of Katounakia, Mount Athos (1929) (Note: On October 20, 2019, at the Protaton Church in Karyes on Mt. Athos, Ecumenical Patriarch Bartholomew announced that the glorification of four great 20th-century Athonite elders would soon proceed, including: Daniel of Katounakia (†1929); Ieronymos of Simonopetra (†1957); Joseph the Hesychast (†1959), and; Ephraim of Katounakia (†1998).)
- Repose of Priest Dimitrie Bejan of Romania (1995)

=== Icons ===
- Icons of the Most Holy Theotokos:

- Kholmsk (1st century) (Note: See: (in Russian) Холмская икона Божией Матери. Википедии. (Russian Wikipedia).)
- "Kursk Root" (1295) (see also: November 27)
- Syamsk (1524)
- Pochaev (1559)
- Glinsk (16th century)
- Lukianov (16th century)
- Isaakov (1659)
- Domnitsk (1696)
- Lesna (Lesninsk) (1696)
- "Kathariotissa", on Ithaca (c. 1696)
- Icon of Sophia, the Wisdom of God (Kiev).
- Synaxis of the Most Holy Theotokos, at several locations in Greece. (Note: Several icons of the Theotokos are venerated on this day in Greece, including the following: (in Greek): Σύναξη Παναγίας Πλατανιώτισσας; Σύναξη της Παναγίας της Τσαμπίκας στην Ρόδο; Σύναξη της Κυρά-Παναγίας; Σύναξη της Παναγίας της Καλολειβαδιανής στην Κύθνο; Σύναξη της Παναγίας της Βουρνιώτισσας στην Τήνο; Σύναξη της Παναγίας Βροντιανής στην Σάμο; Σύναξη της Παναγίας της Καλαμιώτισσας στην Ανάφη; Σύναξη της Παναγίας του Ελέρου στην Κάσο; Σύναξη της Παναγίας της Μποργανούλας στην Κάσο; Σύναξη της Παναγιάς της Σκιαδενής στην Ρόδο; Σύναξη της Παναγίας της Καρδιανής στην Σύρο; Σύναξη της Παναγίας της Σικελίας στην Χίο; Σύναξη της Παναγίας της Βρυσιανής στο Μεσοχώρι Καρπάθου; Σύναξη της Παναγίας της Λαρνιώτισσας στην Κάρπαθο; Σύναξη της Κυρά-Παναγιάς στην Οία της Σαντορίνης; Σύναξη της Παναγίας των Ξένων στην Λευκάδα; Σύναξη της Παναγίας της Καθαριώτισσας στην Ιθάκη; Σύναξη της Παναγίας Μηλιώτισσας στη Μηλιά Αριδαίας; Σύναξη της Παναγίας της Γιάτρισσας στη Μάνη; Σύναξη της Παναγίας της Νάπης (Αγία Νάπα); Σύναξη της Παναγίας της Δροσιανής στην Νάξο; Σύναξη της Παναγίας της Αρακιώτισσας στην Κύπρο; Σύναξη της Παναγίας Γρηγορούσας στην Αθήνα; Σύναξη της Παναγίας της Ποταμίτισσας στην Νίσυρο; Σύναξη της Παναγίας της Ελευθεριώτριας στην Ζάκυνθο; Σύναξη της Παναγίας της Λαγκαδιώτισσας στην Χαλκίδα; Σύναξη της Παναγίας Παντοβασίλισσας στην Ραφήνα; Σύναξη της Παναγίας της Γαυριώτισσας; Σύναξη της Παναγίας της Ατταλειώτισσας στον Ταύρο; Σύναξη της Παναγίας της Πασών γενεών ευφροσύνη στον Άγιο Δημήτριο; Σύναξη της Παναγίας της Ροβέλιστας στην Άρτα; Σύναξη της Παναγίας της Λιμνιάς στην Λίμνη Ευβοίας; Σύναξη της Παναγίας της Γιάτρισσας στο Λουτράκι Κορινθίας; Σύναξη της Παναγίας της Κερατσάνισσας στον Οξύλιθο Ευβοίας; Σύναξη της Παναγίας της Αρεθιώτισσας στην Αμφιλοχία; Σύναξη της Παναγίας της Βουλκανιώτισσας στην Μεσσηνία; Σύναξη της Παναγίας Γουμερά στην Μακρυνίτσα; Σύναξη της Παναγίας της Ζιδανιώτισσας; Σύναξη της Παναγίας Φοινικιώτισσας στην Χρυσούπολη Περιστερίου.)

== Icon gallery ==
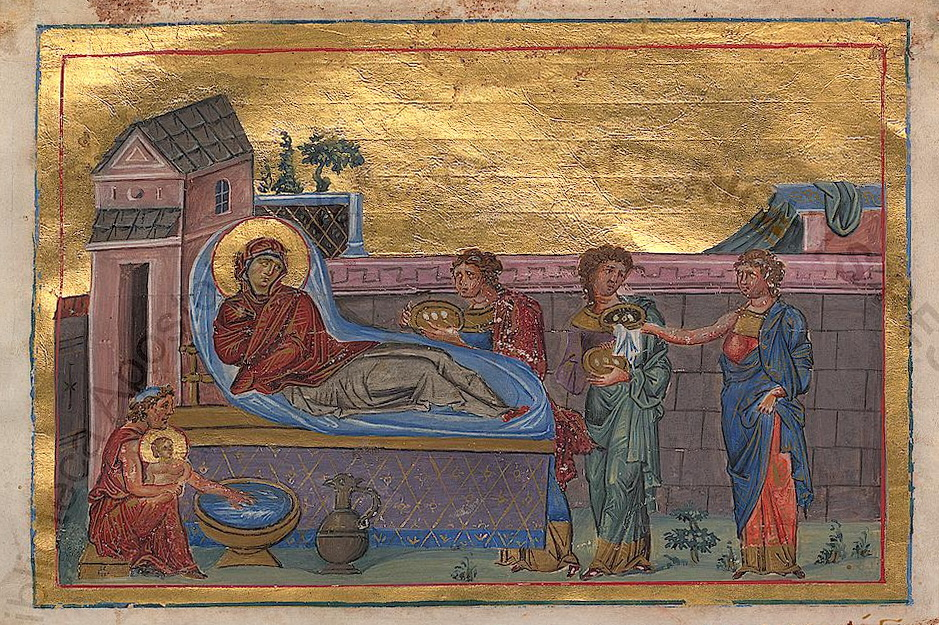
Nativity of Our Most Holy Lady the Theotokos and Ever-Virgin Mary.
(Menologion of Basil II, 10th century).

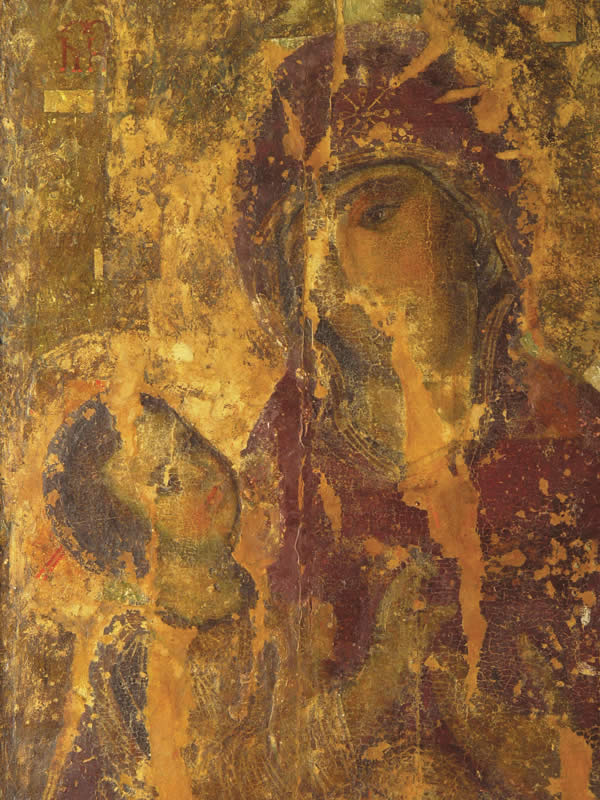
Kholmsk icon.

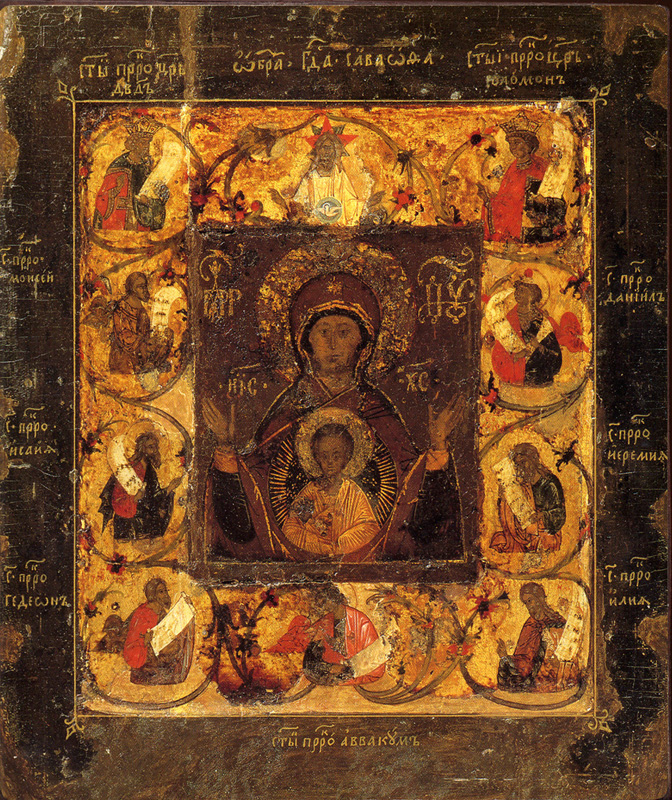
"Kursk Root" Icon of the Mother of God.

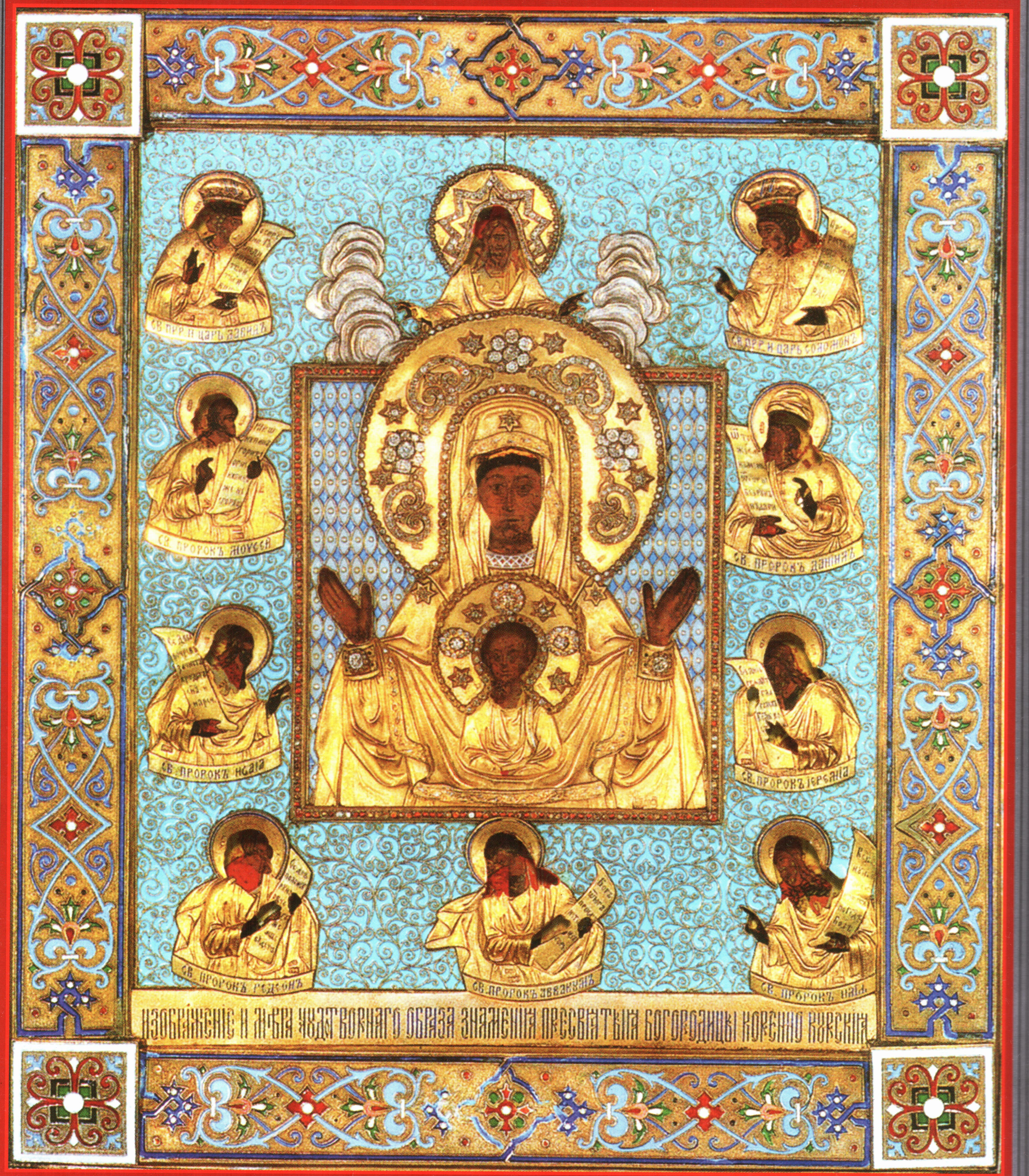
"Kursk Root" Icon of the Mother of God.

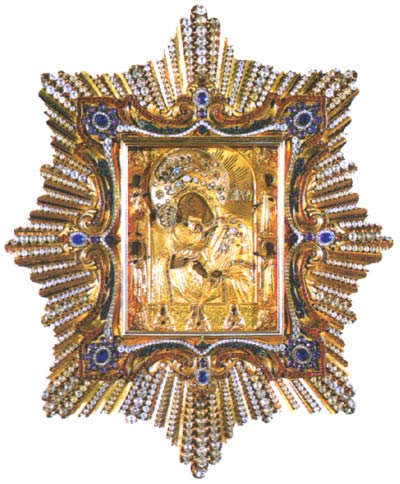
Pochaev Icon of the Mother of God.

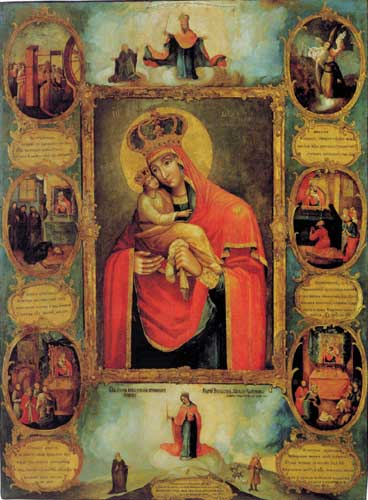
Pochaev Icon.

== Sources ==
- September 8/September 21. Orthodox Calendar (PRAVOSLAVIE.RU).
- September 21 / September 8. HOLY TRINITY RUSSIAN ORTHODOX CHURCH (A parish of the Patriarchate of Moscow).
- September 8. OCA - The Lives of the Saints.
- The Autonomous Orthodox Metropolia of Western Europe and the Americas (ROCOR). St. Hilarion Calendar of Saints for the year of our Lord 2004. St. Hilarion Press (Austin, TX). p. 67.
- The Eighth Day of the Month of September. Orthodoxy in China.
- September 8. Latin Saints of the Orthodox Patriarchate of Rome.
- The Roman Martyrology. Transl. by the Archbishop of Baltimore. Last Edition, According to the Copy Printed at Rome in 1914. Revised Edition, with the Imprimatur of His Eminence Cardinal Gibbons. Baltimore: John Murphy Company, 1916. pp. 275–276.
- Rev. Richard Stanton. A Menology of England and Wales, or, Brief Memorials of the Ancient British and English Saints Arranged According to the Calendar, Together with the Martyrs of the 16th and 17th Centuries. London: Burns & Oates, 1892. pp. 440–441.

Greek Sources

- Great Synaxaristes: (in Greek) 8 ΣΕΠΤΕΜΒΡΙΟΥ. ΜΕΓΑΣ ΣΥΝΑΞΑΡΙΣΤΗΣ.
- (in Greek) Συναξαριστής. 8 Σεπτεμβρίου. ECCLESIA.GR. (H ΕΚΚΛΗΣΙΑ ΤΗΣ ΕΛΛΑΔΟΣ).
- (in Greek) 08/09/2026. Ορθόδοξος Συναξαριστής.

Russian Sources

- (in Russian) 21 сентября (8 сентября). Православная Энциклопедия под редакцией Патриарха Московского и всея Руси Кирилла (электронная версия). (Orthodox Encyclopedia - Pravenc.ru).
- (in Russian) 8 сентября по старому стилю / 21 сентября по новому стилю. Русская Православная Церковь - Православный церковный календарь на 2026 год.
