= Marguerite Yon =

French archaeologist and Historian

Marguerite Yon-Calvet
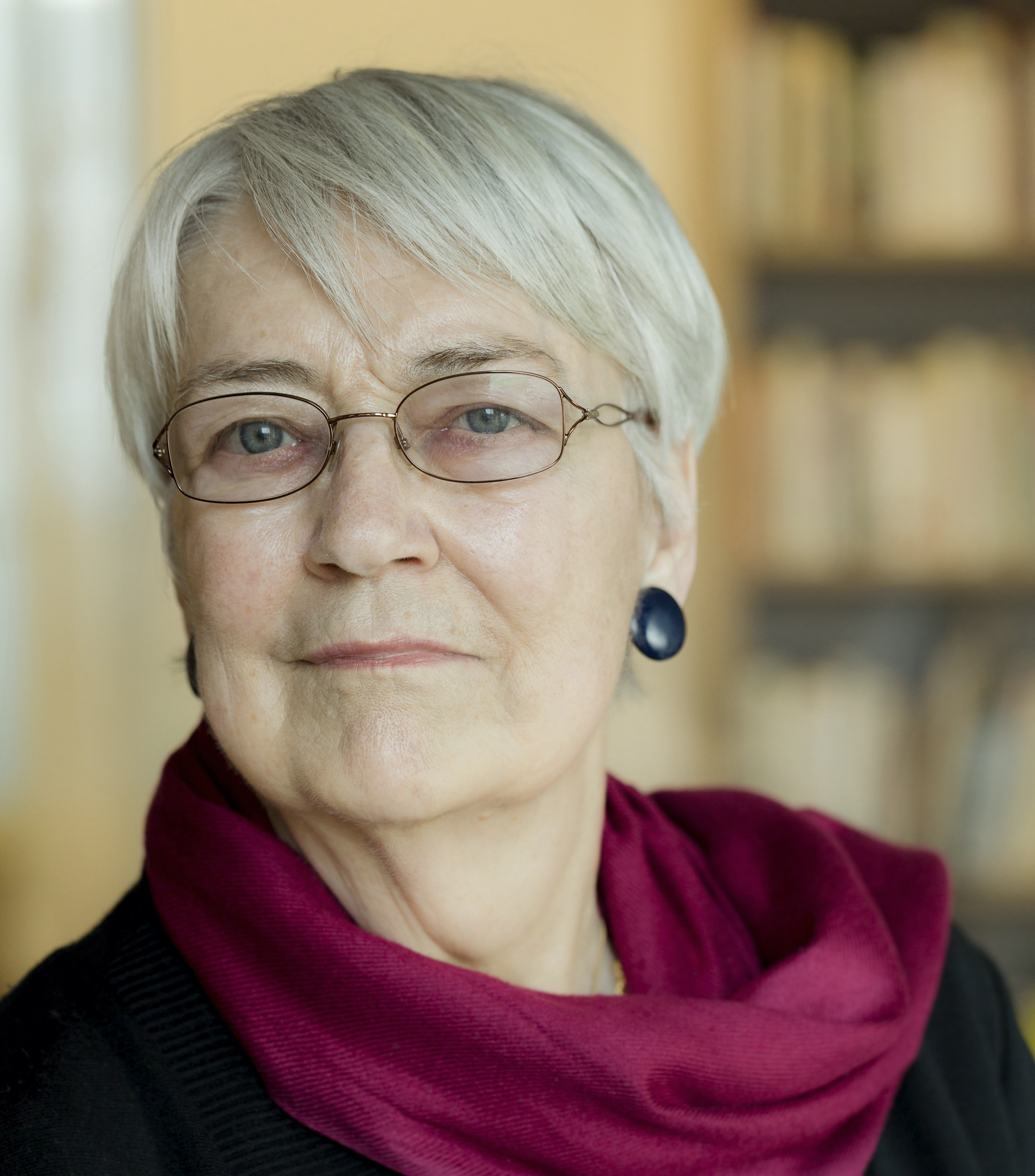
- Occupation(s): Searcher, archaeologist, research director at CNRS
- Organizations: CNRS; Lumière Lyon-II University; French Institute of the Near East (IFPO)
- Spouse: Bernard Yon

Academic work
- Discipline: archaeology and history
- Main interests: ancient Near East

Marguerite Yon, or Marguerite Yon-Calvet, née Calvet, is a French archaeologist and historian, specializing in the ancient Near East, particularly Ugarit in Syria. She is widely recognized for her archaeological work on Ugarit, where she conducted excavations for twenty years. She has extensively excavated the island of Cyprus. Notably, she held the distinction of being the first female president of the Academy of Lyon since its foundation.

== Biography ==
As a research director at CNRS, Marguerite Yon had a particular interest in ancient ceramics. She conducted excavations in the ancient city of Salamis in Cyprus and the Cypriot ports, such as the naval port of Kition Bamboula (modern Larnaca), and the Phoenician sanctuaries on the island.

Marguerite Yon led the Syro-French Archaeological Mission of Ras Shamra-Ugarit for twenty years, from 1978 to 1998. Under her leadership, the mission published sixteen volumes of results. This period marked a significant discovery of numerous documents at the archaeological site, often referred to as a "miracle". The team unearthed over 300 engraved tablets covered with writing, confirming the importance of the relatively forgotten civilization of Ugarit in the history of the Levant and writing. After her retirement from that role in 1999, her brother and close collaborator, Yves Calvet, succeeded her.

She actively engaged in advising other researchers, particularly by assisting in the training of archaeologists from countries involved in her research. For instance, in Lebanon, she provided guidance and support to Lebanese archaeologists on specific issues.

She was awarded the CNRS Silver Medal in 1992 in recognition of her research and scientific contributions. Marguerite Yon-Calvet earned the title of professor emeritus at Lumière Lyon-II University. Elected in 2000 member of the Academy of Lyon, she subsequently became in 2015 the first female president since its foundation in 1700.

== Decorations ==
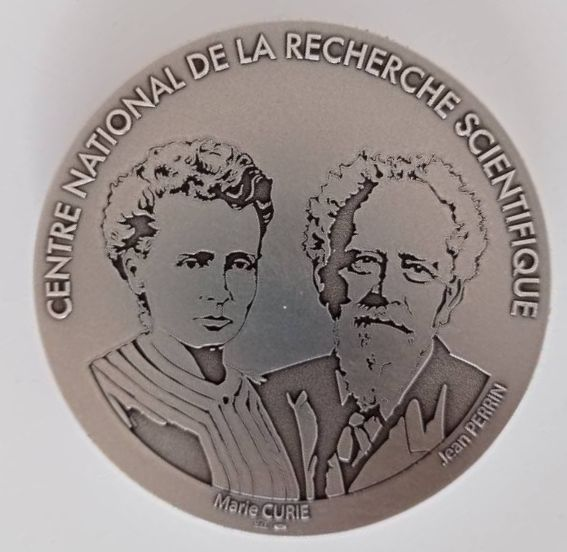
- CNRS Silver Medal (France)
