= Lefkaritis Tomb =

Ancient tomb in Cyprus

The Lefkaritis Tomb is a hypogeum (a type of tomb) in Larnaca, Cyprus.

It was discovered in 1998 in an "un-looted chamber that had been sealed nearly 2800 years ago" in the city-kingdom of Kition. (This tomb was found within the city walls of Kition as opposed to the necropolis on the outside.)

To create a final report on the archaeological excavations of "two important built tombs, namely the Ikarou Street Tomb and the Lefkaritis Tomb" were the primary reasons for the authoring of The Phoenician Period Necropolis of Kition Volume II. (The author participated in the excavations.)

== Excavation ==
The street address where the tomb was unearthed, is Vasileos Konstantinou 27.

Among the "few objects found", were "extraordinary gold ornaments", which were moved to Cyprus Museum for conservation.

== Name ==
The tomb was discovered in the vicinity of the residence of Dino Lefkaritis (a known businessman in the petroleum industry), hence the name Lefkaritis Tomb.
