= Bademus =

Christian martyr and saint (died 376)

Saint Bademus
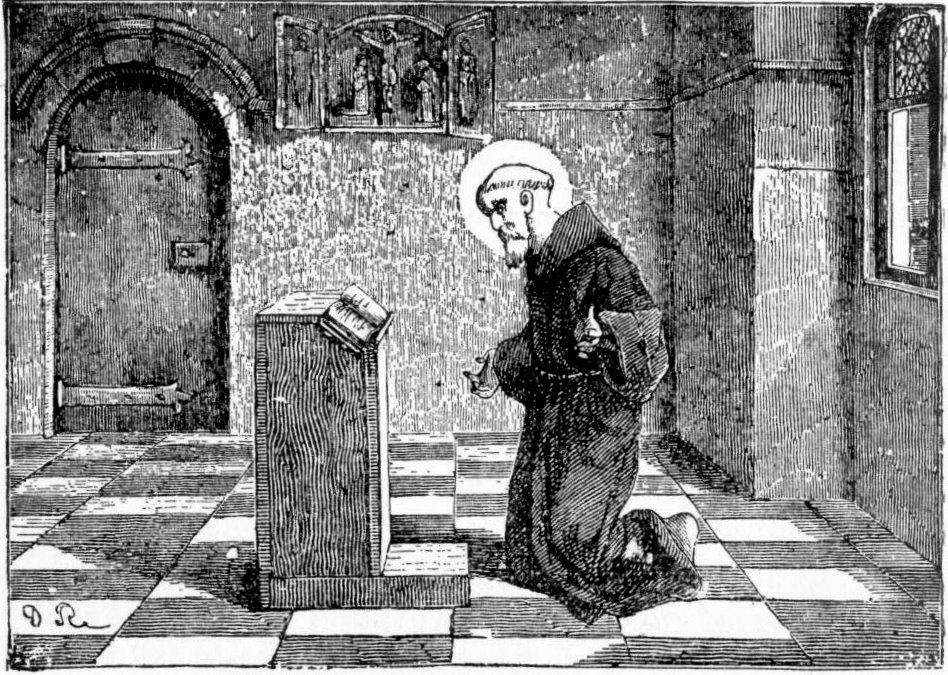
- Saint Bademus (Little Pictorial Lives of the Saints, 1878)

Abbot and Martyr
- Born: c. 4th century AD; Bethlapeta, Persia
- Died: 10 April 376 AD
- Venerated in: Catholic Churches, Eastern Orthodox Church
- Feast: 9 April (Eastern Orthodox Churches); 10 April (Catholic Churches)

Bademus (also known as Bademe and Vadim) was a rich, noble citizen of Bethlapeta in Persia, who founded a monastery nearby. He and some of his disciples were arrested and Bademus was martyred in the year 376; he was subsequently recognized as a saint.

== Martyrology ==
In the thirty-sixth year of Shapur II's persecution, Bademus was arrested with seven of his monks. For months, he lay in chains in a dungeon. At the same time, a Christian lord named Nersan, Prince of Aria, was also imprisoned because he refused to convert to Zoroastrianism. At first, he appeared resolved to keep the faith, but at the sight of tortures he gave in, and promised to conform. In order to test Nersan's sincerity, King Shapur ordered that Bademus be moved into Nersan's cell, which was actually a chamber in the royal palace. Shapur further instructed Nersan that if he would kill Bademus, his princely rights and dignities would be restored.

Nersan accepted the conditions. A sword was placed in his hand, and he advanced so as to plunge it into the abbot's chest. However, he was seized with a sudden terror, so he stopped short, and was unable to lift up his arm to strike for some time. Even so, he attempted to harden himself, and continued, trembling, to aim at Bademus' sides. A combination of fear, shame, remorse, and respect made his strokes weak and unsteady. The martyr's wounds were so numerous that the bystanders are said to have been in admiration of his invincible patience.

The resolute martyr chided his torturer, saying, "Unhappy Nersan, to what a pitch of impiety do you carry your apostasy. With joy I run to meet death; but could wish to fall by some other hand than yours: why must you be my executioner?"

It took four strokes for Nersan to successfully separate Bademus' head from his body. A short time after, Nersan committed suicide. The body of Saint Bademus was cast out of the city by the Sassanids, but was carried away and buried in secret by the Christians. His disciples were released from their chains in 379, after the death of King Shapur.

== See also ==
- Martyrs of Persia under Shapur II
