= Pano Panagia =

Pano Panayia Πάνω Παναγία
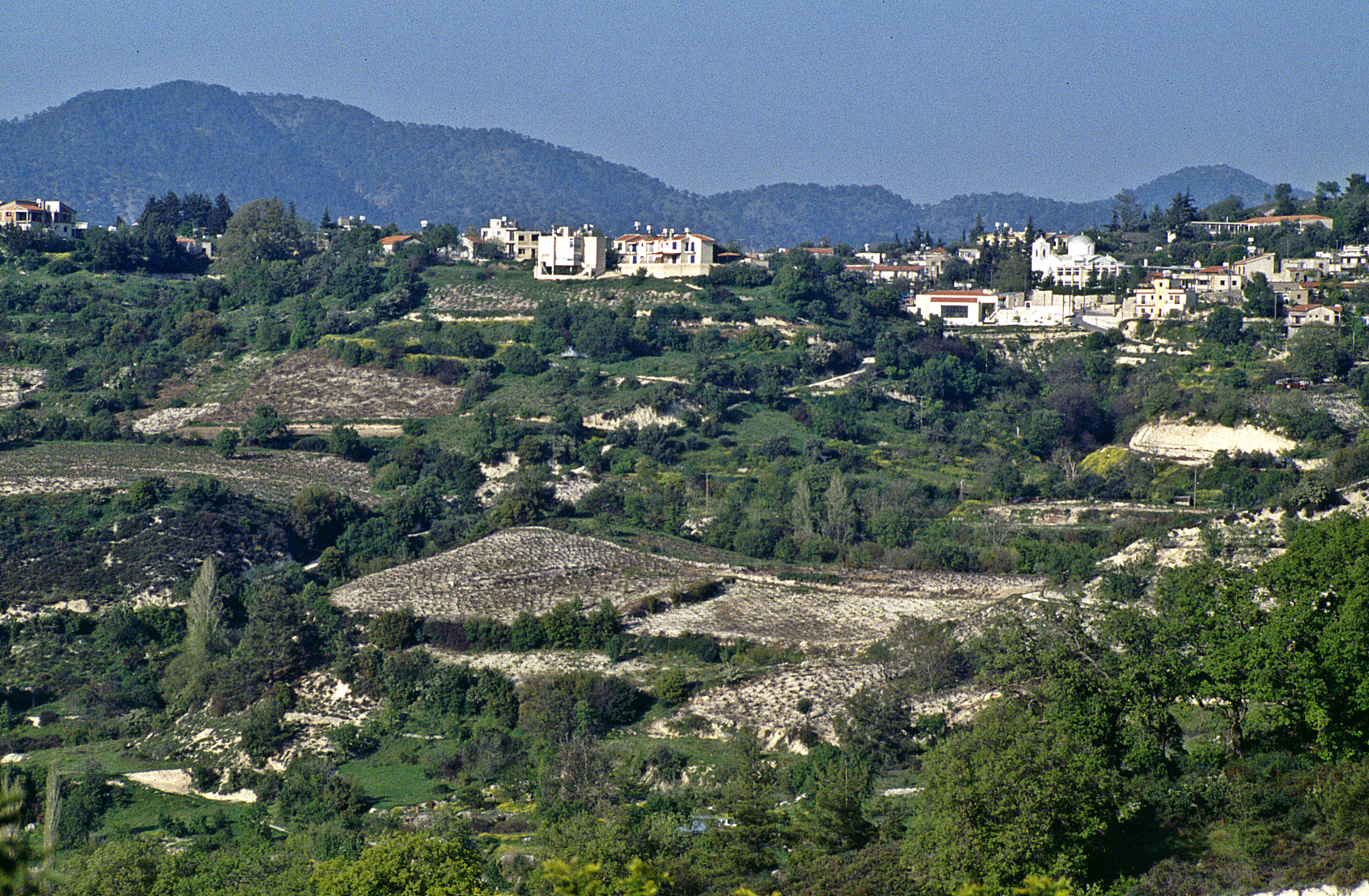

- Location within Cyprus
- Coordinates: 34°55′N 32°38′E
- Country: Cyprus
- District: Pafos District
- Elevation: 900 m (3,000 ft)

Population (2001)
  - Total: 564
- Time zone: UTC+2 (EET)
  - Summer (DST): UTC+3 (EEST)

Pano Panayia (Greek: Πάνω Παναγιά), also known as Panayia (Greek: Παναγιά), is a mountainous village in Cyprus, located at an altitude of 900 metres in the Paphos mountain range, on the outskirts of Paphos forest and 35 minutes from Paphos International Airport.

Panayia owes its name to the many churches and monasteries which are in the village or close to it and which are dedicated to Virgin Mary (who in Greek is called Panayia). The most well known are the ancient church of Panayia Eleousa in the centre of the village, the historical Chrysoroyiatissa Monastery from the 12th century, and the Byzantine Monastery of Panayia tou Kykkou.

Archbishop Makarios III, the first president of the Republic of Cyprus, was born in Panayia in 1913.

The village is also known for its unique wildlife, including the mouflon, which is protected by Cypriot and international laws as an endangered species. It is also known for a viticultural zone called Vouni Panayias, which is considered by wine connoisseurs as the best in the island.

By the 2001 census Panayia had a total population of 564.
