= Sargon Stele =

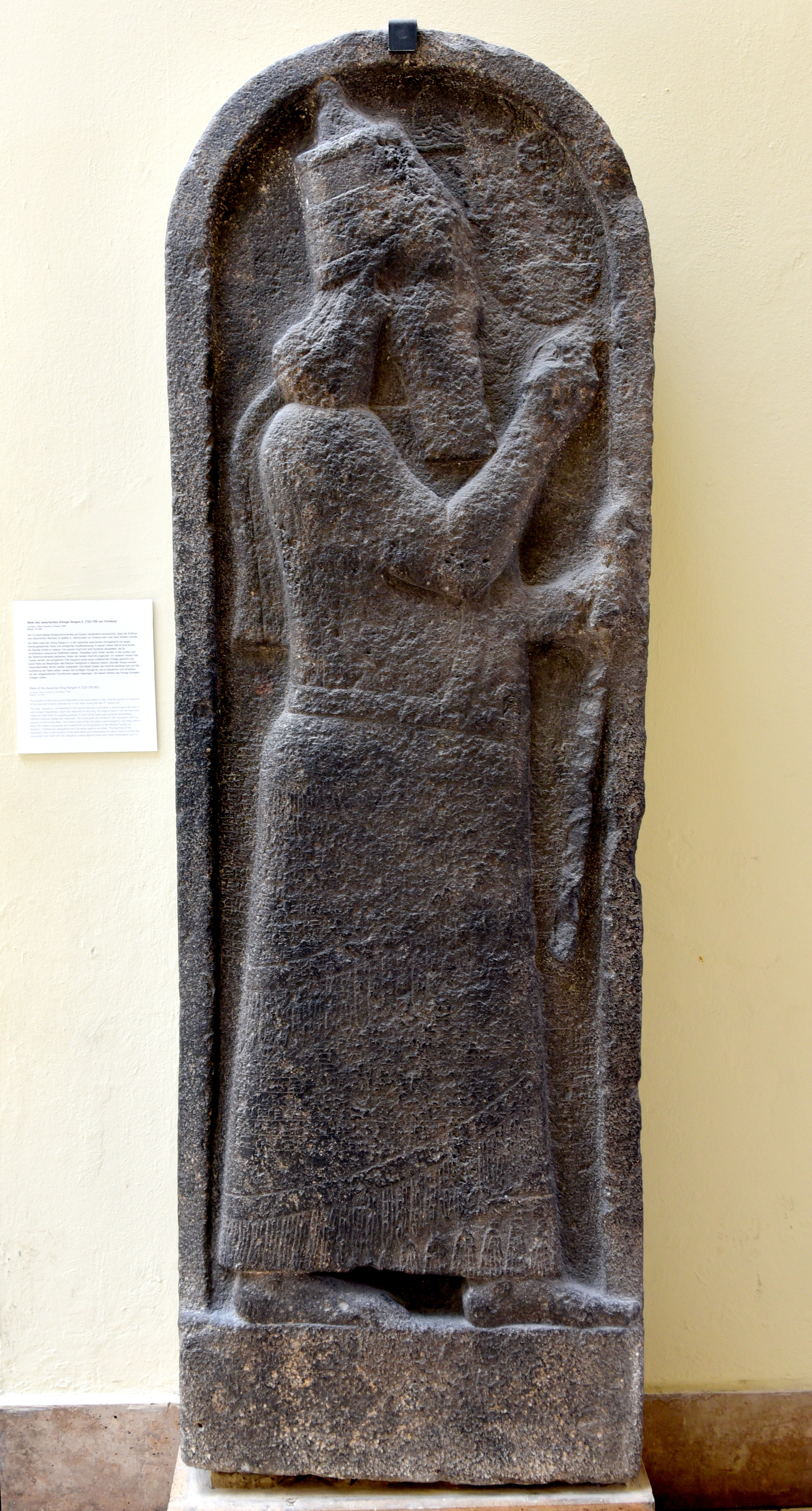
- Material: Basalt
- Height: 2.09 metres (6.9 ft)
- Width: 68 cm (27 in)
- Created: c. 707 BC
- Discovered: 1845; Larnaca, Cyprus
- Present location: Berlin, Germany
- Language: Akkadian

The Sargon Stele was found in the autumn of 1845 in Cyprus on the site of the former city-kingdom of Kition, in present-day Larnaca to the west of the old harbour of Kition in the archaeological site of Bamboula. The language on the stele is Assyrian Akkadian.

The stele was placed there during the time Sargon II (r. 722–705 BC) ruled the Neo-Assyrian Empire (935–605 BC). It was offered for sale to the British Museum, which bid 20 £. Ludwig Ross offered 50 £ for the stele and it was shipped to a museum in Berlin where it remains at the Berlin State Museums. Together with the stele was found a gilded silver plakette, that today is located at the Louvre. A replica of the stele is on display in the Larnaca District Museum.

== Inscription ==
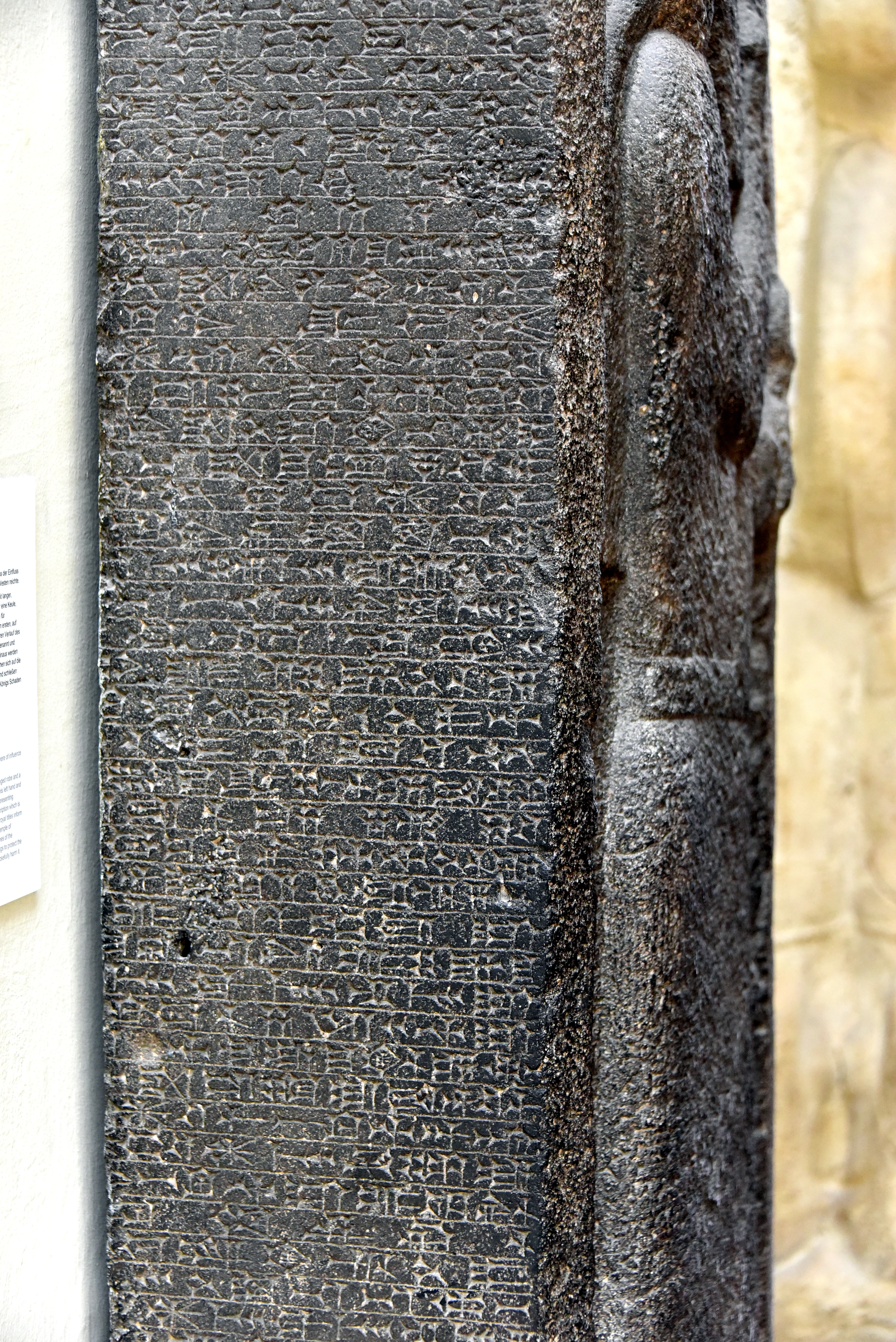
Cuneiform inscriptions on one of the sides of the stele of Sargon II from Cyprus at the Pergamon Museum, Berlin

Karen Radner summed up the contents of the cuneiform inscription in 2010:

- "Invocation of Aššur, Sin, Šamaš, Adad, Marduk, Nabû, Ištar, Sebetti"—paragraph 1.
- "Introduction of Sargon, with royal titles and as the protégé of the gods"—paragraph 2.
- "Summary of the military successes: the subjugation of the Babylonian cities; the rule over all people between the Upper Sea and the Lower Sea; the victories against Elam, in Iran and in Hatti; the humiliation of Urzana of Musasir and Rusa of Urartu; the defeat of Hamath"—paragraph 3.
- "Sargon as the guardian of the Marduk temple at Babylon"—paragraph 4.
- "The delegations from Dilmun and Adnana"—paragraph 5.
- "The erection of the monument in a connection with Mount Ba'al-harri"—paragraph 6.
- "Instructions for future kings to safeguard the monument"—paragraph 7.
- "Curses against those who harm it"—paragraph 8.

The stele was erected around 707 BC but does not refer to the specific names of all ten city-kingdoms of Cyprus at the time. Cypriot kingdoms may have become vassal to the Assyrian king Sargon II.

The city-kingdoms of Cyprus are listed somewhat later by the Assyrian king Esarhaddon (680–669 BCE) as Idalium, Chytri, Soli, Paphos, Salamis, Kourion, Tamassos, the "New Town", Ledra and "Nuria".

== Theories about the purposes of the stele ==
Karen Radner said in 2010 that "In the inscriptions of Sargon we find, for the first time, that islands are used to mark the scope of Assyria's might—perhaps an indication of growing awareness that the world is more than one landmass enclosed by the sea".

Karen Radner writes that Cyprus "was at that time dominated (to use a deliberately vague term) by the Phoenician kingdom of Tyre which, according to the Assyrian testimony, treated the local city-states as its vassals."

When the stele was erected, Tyre still dominated Cyprus, although the Assyrians were now showing more interest in the island. Gradually, the role of Tyre diminished, and Assyrians began to establish direct contacts.
