= Catacomb of Phaneromeni Church =

8th century burial cite in Cyprus

The Catacomb of Phaneromeni Church in Larnaca, Cyprus is a catacomb. It is located next to the Panagia Phaneromeni Church. The catacombs belong to the Monastery of Panagia Chrysoleontissa

== Background ==
The stairs leading to the entrance of the catacomb, are outside the Phaneromeni Church—located around 7 meters from the east wall of the church building. This tomb was discovered in 1870. The church building adjacent to the tombs dates to 1920. It is a simple white church with a dome and two bell towers. There is a network of catacomb tunnels running underneath the church, including two large tombs connected by a corridor. The catacombs belong to the Monastery of Panagia Chrysoleontissa.

The Phaneromeni Tomb is also known as the Saint Phaneromeni Rock-cut Tomb. It is a rock cavern with two chambers. The structure suggests that it once was a pagan tomb, dating back to Phoenician times. Sources disagree on the exact date of the tombs, with reports differing from 1200 BC to the fourth century BC.

The place is credited with various magical properties: those who wanted to ask for help from the Virgin Mary could leave pieces of clothing on the gate. The tombs are still used for worship today, with a large number of offerings and icons of the Virgin Mary found inside. Additionally, it is believed that the adjacent church was constructed after a local resident dreamt about the Virgin Mary, and then found an icon of her close to the site of the tombs.

Two further tombs were discovered connected to the catacomb during excavations in 2012.

== See also ==
- Faneromeni Monastery in Lefkadas (Greek Wikipedia)
- Faneromeni Monastery in Salamina (Greek Wikipedia)
