= Batheos Rhyakos Monastery =

Church in Tirilye, Turkey

Coordinates: 40.3833°N 28.8000°E

- Interactive map of Batheos Rhyakos Monastery

Monastery information
- Other name: Aya Sotiri

Site
- Location: Tirilye, Turkey

Batheos Rhyakos Monastery was a Byzantine-era monastery near medieval Trigleia in Bithynia (modern Tirilye in Turkey). It is now known locally as Aya Sotiri. Dating back to medieval times, it was revered until the Greco-Turkish population exchange in 1922.

The church of the monastery had an east-west oriented rectangular naos, with a rounded apse in the north part of the east end and a narthex at the west end. The building’s exterior dimensions measured 16 by 9 meters.

In the 1880s, the monastery was described as “neglected,” with only the four walls of the church and some scattered columns remaining. However, In 1910, it seems to have been described as “recently restored.”

When the area was cleared of brush and mapped in 1987, the monastery was in ruins and mostly rubble; then, in 1988, the landowner cleared the area with heavy machinery and built a shed. In 2017, piles of stones from the walls remained.

The monastery is also known as the Monastery of the Transfiguration of Christ the Savior (Greek: Μονή Μεταμορφόσεως Σωτήρος Χριστού ), the Soteros or Savior Monastery (Μονή Σωτήρος).
