= Saint Dotto =

5th century saint

- Born: 5th century Scotland
- Died: 502; Orkney Islands
- Canonized: Pre-congregation
- Feast: 9 April

Saint Dotto (died 502) was said to have founded a monastery on one of the Orkney Islands, which bore his name. The island appears on maps from 1629 to be the area of Hoxa - not an island but a peninsula. His feast day is 9 April.

== Dubious existence ==
The tale of Saint Dotto, after whom one of the Orkney Islands was named, with his feast date of 9 April, appears to be based only on David Camerarius's Scottish Menology. Camerarius says he lived after churches and monasteries in Orkney had been dedicated to Saint Brendan (c. 484–577), but that he died in 502 AD. The Bollandists are therefore skeptical about his existence. John O'Hanlon notes that Camerarius gives no sources for his information and that there is no island by that name. This has since been proven to be inaccurate as such a location is present on early maps of Orkney, lending to stronger evidence he did exist.

== Monks of Ramsgate account ==
The Monks of Ramsgate wrote in their Book of Saints (1921),

DOTTO (St.) Abbot (Apr. 9)
(6th cent. A Saint who has left his name to one of the Orkney Islands, where he is said to have been head of a monastery. Nothing certain is known about him.

== Butler's account ==
The hagiographer Alban Butler (1710–1773) wrote in his Lives of the Fathers, Martyrs, and Other Principal Saints under April 9,

St. Dotto, Abbot

One of the isles of Orkney, in which he founded and governed a great monastery in the sixth century, bears his name to this day. In the same island stood other monasteries and churches dedicated to God under the patronage of St. Brenden. Though all the isles of Orkney are recommended for the healthfulness of the air, and longevity of the inhabitants, this of St. Dotto is remarkable above the rest on these accounts. Our saint lived near one hundred years, and with great joy repeated in his last moments: I have rejoiced in those things which have been told me: we will go into the house of the Lord.—Ps. cxxi. See Donald Monroe, De Insulis and Bishop Lesley’s nephew, De Sanctis Scotiæ.

== O'Hanlon's account ==
John O'Hanlon (1821–1905) in his Lives of the Irish saints wrote,

Reputed Feast of St. Dotto, Abbot, Orkney Islands. It is stated, by Camerarius, in his Scottish Menology, that formerly St. Dotto was an Abbot, celebrated among the Orkney Islanders, and that one of the group was known as the Island of St. Dotto. The Orkneys contained churches and monasteries, dedicated to St. Brandan. The Bollandists observe, however, that there is no mention of such an Island, in the very accurate description of the Orkneys, given by Robert Gordon, nor does it seem to be noticed among the group, in the best modern Atlases. The Bollandists who notice Dotto, at the 9th of April, seem to be in doubt, not alone as to his Cultus, but even as to his existence; since they find no mention of him, in Dempster's Menologium Scoticum, in a Manuscript Catalogue of the Saints of Scotland, nor in the Breviary of Aberdeen. Camerarius tells us, that he died A.D. 502, but he does not give the source, whence his information had been derived. A notice of this saint is given, in the work of Bishop Forbes.

== Sources ==
- Butler, Alban (1821), The lives of the fathers, martyrs, and other principal saints, vol. 4 This article incorporates text from this source, which is in the public domain.
- O'Hanlon, John (1875), Lives of the Irish saints, vol. 4
- Smith, William; Wace, Henry (1877), A Dictionary of Christian Biography, Literature, Sects and Doctrines, London: John Murray
- St. Augustine's Abbey, Ramsgate (1921). The Book of saints : a dictionary of servants of God canonized by the Catholic Church. London: A. & C. Black, ltd. OCLC 671676136. This article incorporates text from this source, which is in the public domain.
