= Chrysoroyiatissa Monastery =

Monastery in Cyprus

Chrysoroyiatissa
- Χρυσορρογιάτισσα
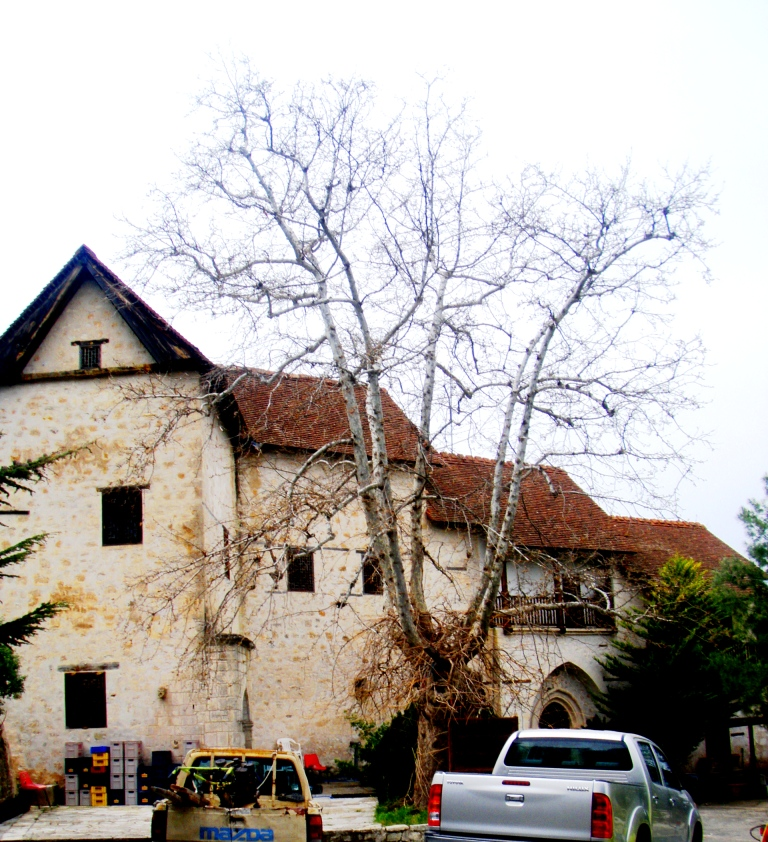
- Interactive map of Chrysoroyiatissa

Monastery information
- Established: 1152
- Dedication: Virgin Mary
- Celebration: August 15
- Diocese: Church of Cyprus; Paphos Bishopric

People
- Founder: Monk Ignatius

Architecture
- Functional status: active

Site
- Location: Panayia, Cyprus
- Coordinates: 34.9101°N 32.6186°E

Chrysoroyiatissa (Greek: Χρυσορρογιάτισσα) is a monastery dedicated to Our Lady of the Golden Pomegranate located about 40 kilometers north-east of Paphos, Cyprus at an altitude of around 820 meters. It was founded by a monk called Ignatius (Greek: Ιγνάτιος) in the 12th century. It lies 1.5 kilometers from the village of Panayia, birthplace of the late Archbishop Makarios. The present building dates to 1770.

Celebrations are held yearly on 15 August in honour of the Virgin Mary. In the mid 1980s the old winery of the monastery was reopened and now runs on a commercial basis. It produces wines from the monastery's own vineyards.
