= Eupsychius of Caesaria =

Christian martyr (died 362)

Saint Eupsychius of Caesarea
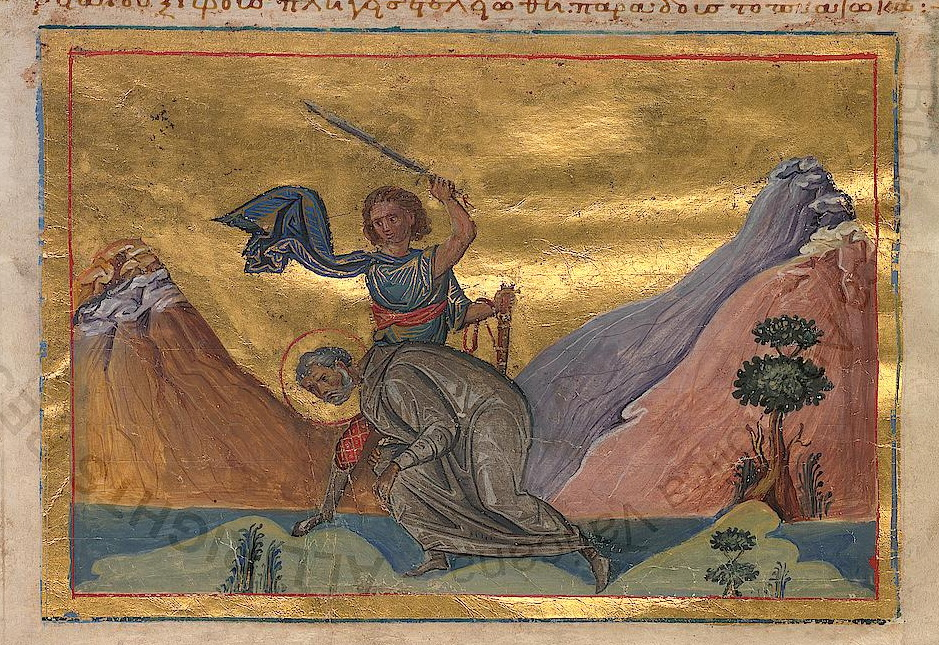
- Miniature from the Menologion of Basil II
- Residence: Caesarea
- Died: 362; Caesarea (modern-day Kayseri, Turkey)
- Feast: 9 April

Saint Eupsychius of Caesaria in Cappadocia (died 362 AD) was a Christian martyr who was executed for having caused the destruction of a pagan temple.

== History and legend ==
There seems to be a historical basis for the story of Eupsychius, although later writers have embellished it with hagiographical inventions. Sozomen's Church History V:II 7-8, writing of Julian's reign (361–363), stated that Eupsychius, a newly-married nobleman of Caesarea in Cappadocia was executed for causing the destruction of the temple of Tyche. The emperor was angry with all the citizens of Caesarea, and the participants in the temple's destruction were punished with death or exile. Arethas of Caesarea also mentions that Eupsychius was newly married when he was martyred.

Subsequent redactions expand and embellish the basic story. Thus the Synaxarion of Constantinople states that he was put on the rack and cruelly flogged, then an angel appeared and strengthened him. He was again hung on the rack and scourged so that his inner organs were exposed, then was beheaded. Instead of blood, milk and water flowed, a strange sight for all to see.

== Monks of Ramsgate account ==
The monks of St Augustine's Abbey, Ramsgate, wrote in their Book of Saints (1921),

EUPSYCHIUS (St.) m. (April 9)
(4th cent.) a young patrician of Caesaria in Cappadocia. Julian the Apostate, learning that the Temple of Fortune in that city had been destroyed, ordered a special persecution of Christians to appease the gods. Eupsychius, accused of the crime, was cruelly tortured and beheaded (A.D. 362).

== Butler's account ==
The hagiographer Alban Butler (1710–1773) wrote in his Lives of the Primitive Fathers, Martyrs, and Other Principal Saints, under April 9,

Saint Eupsychius, M.
Julian the Apostate, in his march to Antioch, arriving at Cæsarea, the capital of Cappadocia, was exceedingly irritated to find the greater part of the city Christians, and that they had lately demolished a temple dedicated to Fortune, being the last pagan temple remaining there: wherefore he struck it out of the list of cities, and ordered that it should resume its ancient name of Mazaca, instead of that of Cæsarea, the name with which Tiberius had honoured it. He deprived the churches, in the city and its territory, of all that they possessed in moveables or other goods, making use of torments to oblige them to a discovery of their wealth. He caused all the clergy to be enlisted among the train-bands, under the governor of the province, which was the most contemptible, and frequently the most burdensome service, and on the lay Christians he imposed a heavy tax. Many of them he put to death, the principal of which number was Saint Eupsychius, a person of noble extraction, lately married. The tyrant left an order that the Christians should be compelled to rebuild the temples; but, instead of that, they erected a church to the true God, under the title of Saint Eupsychius: in which, on the 8th of April, eight years after, Saint Basil celebrated the feast of this martyr, to which he invited all the bishops of Pontus, in a letter yet extant.

== Sources ==
- Butler, Alban (1798), The Lives of the Primitive Fathers, Martyrs, and Other Principal Saints, J. Moir This article incorporates text from this source, which is in the public domain.
- St. Augustine's Abbey, Ramsgate (1921), The Book of saints : a dictionary of servants of God canonized by the Catholic Church, London: A. & C. Black, ltd. This article incorporates text from this source, which is in the public domain.
- Westerink, L. G. (1983), "The Two Faces of St. Eupsychius", Harvard Ukrainian Studies, vol. 7, pp. 666–679, JSTOR 41036125
