= Ephraim of Vatopedi =

Greek Orthodox monastic leader

Elder Ephraim of Vatopedi
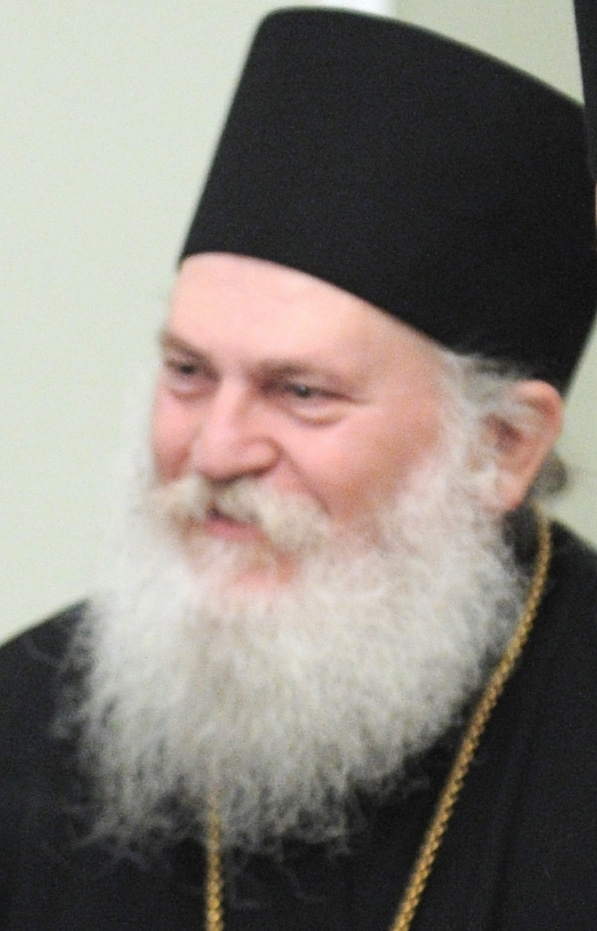
- Ephraim of Vatopedi in 2011
- Native name: Εφραίμ Βατοπεδινός
- Church: Greek Orthodox Church

Personal details
- Born: Vasilios Koutsou (Βασίλειος Κουτσού); June 5, 1956 (age 70) Peristeronopigi, Famagusta District, Cyprus
- Denomination: Eastern Orthodox Christianity
- Residence: Vatopedi, Mount Athos
- Parents: Sotiris and Kyriaki Koutsou
- Occupation: Abbot and monk
- Education: University of Athens (1978)

Elder Ephraim of Vatopedi (born 1956 as Vasilios Koutsou) is a Greek Cypriot Orthodox Christian hieromonk and archimandrite. He is currently Abbot of the Holy Monastery of Vatopedi at Mount Athos.

== Early life ==
He was born on 5 June 1956 in Peristeronopigi, Famagusta District, Cyprus (currently administered by Northern Cyprus). His parents, Sotiris and Kyriaki Koutsou, had four other children, while his father had two more children by his first wife, Pantelou. His brother by blood is the former member of the House of Representatives of Cyprus, Nikos Koutsou. Elder Ephraim had shown his religiosity from a young age, serving in his village church, attending Byzantine music classes and expressing his intention to become a priest. After completing his secondary education at the Gymnasium of Lefkoniko, he entered the Apostle Barnabas Seminary in Nicosia to attend classes with the ultimate goal of becoming a priest. However, after the Turkish invasion of Cyprus in the summer of 1974, he and his family were expelled from his village and took refuge in the village of Tersefanou in Larnaca District. During the Turkish invasion of Cyprus, his father and two of his older brothers were taken as prisoners by the Turks. His father has been missing ever since.

== Education ==
After the 1974 Turkish invasion of Cyprus and the ensuing refugee crisis, Vasilios enrolled in the Department of Theology at the Theological Faculty of the University of Athens, where he attended classes for four years and graduated in 1978. Afterwards, he returned to his native Cyprus and taught as a professor for some time at the Apostolos Barnabas Seminary in Nicosia.

== Early monastic years ==
As a young theologian, Vasilios had close contact with the Orthodox Church and visited various monasteries in Cyprus. In the late 1970s (around 1979), he became a disciple of the Cypriot Athonite monk Elder Joseph later called Joseph of Vatopedi. After returning to Cyprus, he practiced for some time at the Holy Monastery of Timios Stavros Minthis in Paphos. During this time, the then Deacon, now Metropolitan Athanasios of Limassol, also became a disciple of Elder Joseph.

After his time at the Holy Monastery of the Holy Cross of Minthis in Paphos District, Elder Joseph returned to Mount Athos with his brotherhood. At first they settled in the Monastery of Koutloumousiou near Karyes, Mount Athos where they stayed for more than a year. They were then transferred to New Skete in the Cell of Evangelism. There, in 1982, Vasilios Koutsou was ordained as Ephraim in the Monastery of Agiou Pavlou. Subsequently in 1983, he was ordained Hierodeacon and then Hieromonk. In New Skete, several more monks joined the brotherhood of Elder Joseph (of Vatopedi). On Mount Athos, Ephraim also became acquainted with St. Ephraim of Katounakia and St. Paisios of Mount Athos.

== Abbot of Vatopedi ==
Around 1987, at the invitation of Vatopedi Monastery, part of the brotherhood of Elder Joseph settled in the monastery to support and help the remaining elderly Vatopedi monks. By decision of the Ecumenical Patriarchate of Constantinople in 1989, the entire brotherhood was transferred to the Monastery of Vatopedi, which was transformed from an idiorrhythmic monastery into a cenobitic monastery. In March 1990, an election for Abbot of the Holy Monastery of Vatopedi was held, in which Hieromonk Ephraim was elected at the age of 34, while Elder Joseph was selected as the spiritual father of Vatopedi.

Subsequently, in April 1990, on the Sunday of the Myrrh-bearers, Hieromonk Ephraim was promoted to Archimandrite and ordained as Abbot of the Holy Monastery of Vatopedi. The ordination was attended by the then Metropolitan of Demetrias and later Archbishop Christodoulos of Athens, the Civil Administrator of Mount Athos, Konstantinos Loulis, and the Protector of Mount Athos, Elder Theokletos Dionysiatis. In July 2009, after the death of Elder Joseph of Vatopedi, Archimandrite Ephraim became the spiritual father.

On 28 December 2011, following his detention at the General Police Directorate of Attica, Abbot Ephraim was remanded to Korydallos Prison as a defendant in the Vatopedi Monastery case. Later, after a few months, he was released from prison since the charges against him were not sufficient for his detention. Various influential Orthodox clerical leaders, such as Patriarch Kirill of Moscow (the Patriarch of Moscow and All in Russia) and the Holy Synod of the Church of Greece, had requested the termination of his detention. He was released from prison after a few months.

Ephraim, as well as those accused with him in the Vatopedi Monastery case, were finally acquitted by the Supreme Court of Greece on 21 March 2017.

== COVID-19 hospitalization ==
On 28 May 2021, Abbot Ephraim was admitted to the Evangelismos Hospital in Athens, having fallen ill with COVID-19. Five days later, he was intubated, due to complications in his body due to his underlying illnesses. Since the early morning hours of 16 June, he was in critical condition in the intensive care unit. A few days later his health began to recover. On 12 July, the tracheostomy he had undergone was removed, and he was intubated and remained in the ICU. On 17 July, he was discharged from the hospital and, following the instructions of his doctors, continued his treatment in a rehabilitation centre.

== Spiritual lineage ==
The spiritual lineage of Ephraim of Vatopedi is as follows.

1. Daniel of Katounakia (1846–1929)
2. Joseph the Hesychast (1897–1959)
3. Joseph of Vatopedi (1921–2009)
4. Ephraim of Vatopedi (b. 1956)
