= August 15 (Eastern Orthodox liturgics) =

Day in the Eastern Orthodox liturgical calendar

Eastern Orthodox liturgical calendar
August 14	August 15	August 16
August 15 O.S. ≍ August 28 N.S. August 15 N.S ≍ August 2 O.S.

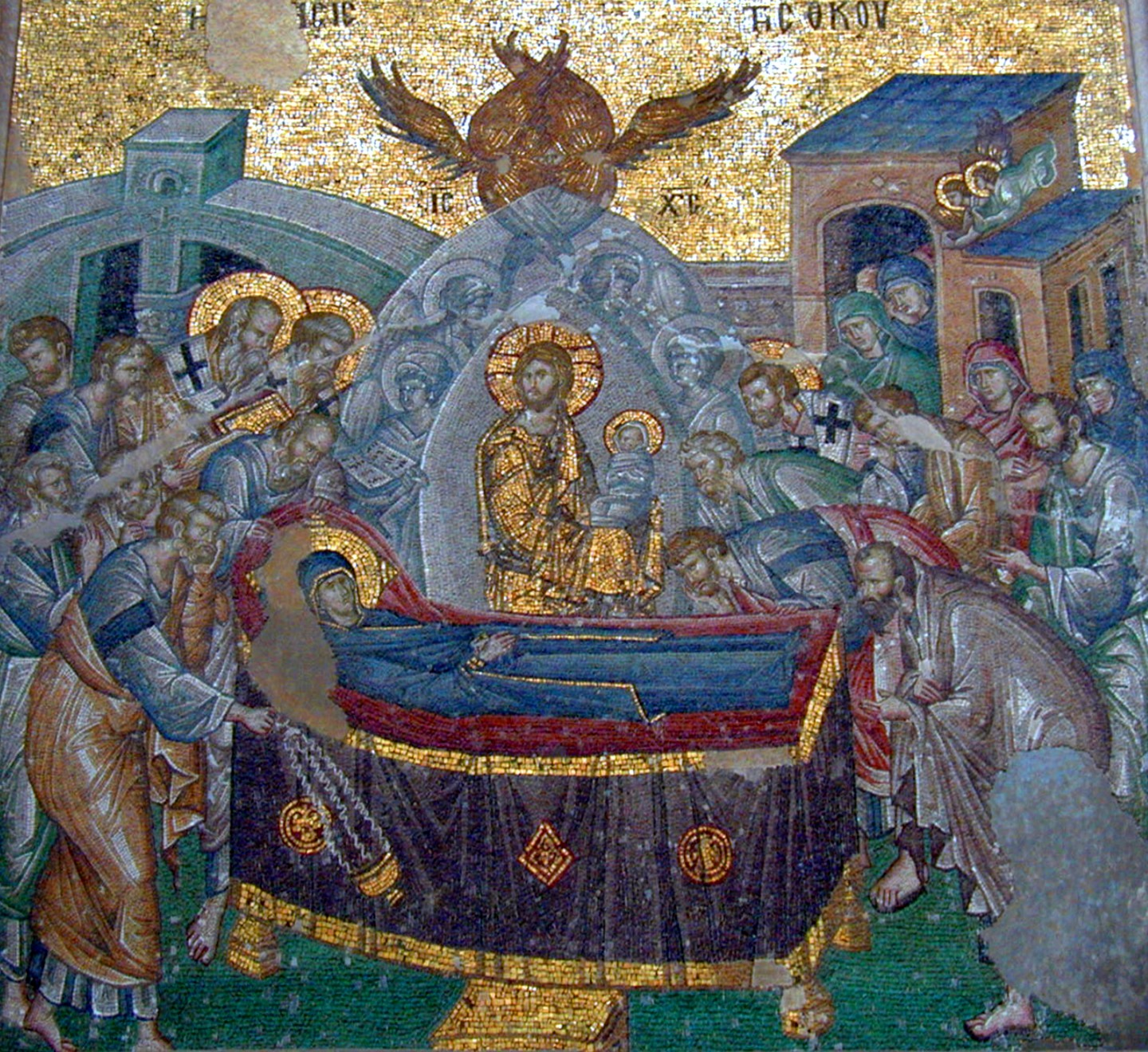
Mosaic of the Dormition of the Mother of God. (Church of the Holy Saviour in Chora).

August 15 in Eastern Orthodox liturgical calendars is a feast day and a day of commemoration of saints and martyrs. Although some Orthodox churches use the Revised Julian Calendar and others use the traditional Julian calendar, the fixed commemorations for their respective August 15 are broadly the same, no matter which calendar is used. (Note: Despite the dates being the same, the days to which they refer typically differ by 13 days. The notation Old Style or O.S. is sometimes used to indicate a date in the traditional Julian Calendar (the "Old Calendar"). The notation New Style or N.S. indicates a date in the Revised Julian calendar (the "New Calendar").)

== Feasts ==
- The Dormition of Our Most Holy Lady the Theotokos and Ever-Virgin Mary. (Note: Name days celebrated today include: Maria / Mary (Μαρία); Mario / Marios / Marius (Μάριος); Panagiotis (Παναγιώτης); Panagiota (Παναγιώτα); Despina (Δέσποινα).) (Note: This feast has been called the "patronal feast day of Ukraine." In fact, the three great monasteries/lavras of Ukraine are dedicated to the Holy Dormition: the Pochaiv Lavra in the west, the Kyiv Caves Lavra, and the Svyatohirska ("Holy Mountain") Lavra in the east. As during Holy Week, so too on this day a special Epitaphion/winding sheet in honour of the Most Holy Mother of God is brought out for public veneration. In accordance with what is a unique Ukrainian church tradition, the miraculous icon of the Dormition in the Kyiv Caves Lavra hangs above the main iconostasis and is lowered on major festal days. The miraculous icon of the Pochaiv Mother of God likewise hangs over the Royal Doors of the iconostasis and is lowered for public veneration.) (Note: "Roman Martyrology. In the Greek Church "the Repose of the Virgin." It was celebrated in the time of Constantine the Great on Jan. 18 but was transferred at the request of the Emperor Maurice, in 582, to Aug. 15 (Niceph. xvii. 28). In the Council of Mainz in 819, it was appointed as one of the great festivals of the year. Pope Leo IV., in 847, provided the festival with a vigil and an octave. In the 7th cent. Pope Sergius appointed litanies for that day.")

== Pre-Schism Western saints ==
- Martyr Tarcisius, at Rome, seized by a heathen mob and preferred to die rather than expose the sacred mysteries to profanation (c. 253–260) (Note: "At Rome, on the Appian way, St. Tharsicius, acolyte. The Pagans accosted him as he was carrying the sacrament of Christ's body, and began to inquire what it was. But he judged it an unworthy thing to cast pearls before swine. They therefore beat him with sticks and stones until he expired. The sacrilegious searchers examined his body, but found no vestige of the sacrament of Christ, either in his hands or in his clothes. The Christians took up the body of the martyr, and buried it reverently in the cemetery of Callistus.") (see also: August 14 - Greek)
- Saint Alypius of Thagaste, Bishop of Tagaste in North Africa (c. 430) (Note: A disciple and lifelong friend of Blessed Augustine, he was also baptised in Milan on Easter Eve 387. On his return to Africa he lived as a hermit. St Alipius then visited Palestine and in about 393 he became Bishop of Tagaste in North Africa.)
- Saint Altfrid, Bishop of Hildesheim, was devoted to the Mother of God (874) (Note: A monk at Corvey in Germany, in 851 he became Bishop of Hildesheim. He was known as a fosterer of peace and goodwill and was devoted to the Mother of God.)
- Saint Arduinus, a priest in Rimini in Italy who lived as a hermit and ended his days in the monastery of San Gudenzio (1009)

== Post-Schism Orthodox saints ==
- Venerable Macarius the Roman, Abbot (1550)
- Saint Chariton of Novgorod (16th century), disciple of St. Macarius the Roman.
- New Hieromartyr Christos, Hieromonk, of Ioannina (c. 1770)
- Saint Stephen, Elder, of Vyatka (1890)

=== New martyrs and confessors ===
- New Hieromartyr Andrew Voliansky, Priest (1919) (Note: (in Russian) иерея Андрея (Волянский Андрей, +28.08.1919).)
- New Hieromartyr Paul Szwajko, Priest, and New Martyr Joanna, Presvytera, of Graboviec (Chelm and Podlasie, Poland) (1943)

== Other commemorations ==
- Commemoration of the Miracle of the Theotokos at the Siege of Constantinople (717–18). (Note: After thirteen months of siege, on 15 August 718, the Arabs departed. The date coincided with the feast of the Dormition of the Theotokos (Assumption of Mary), and it was to her that the Byzantines ascribed their victory. As military historian Paul K. Davis wrote, "By turning back the Moslem invasion, Europe remained in Christian hands, and no serious Moslem threat to Europe existed until the fifteenth century. This victory, coincident with the Frankish victory at Tours (732), limited Islam's western expansion to the southern Mediterranean world." Thus the historian John B. Bury called 718 "an ecumenical date", while the Greek historian Spyridon Lambros likened the siege to the Battle of Marathon and Leo III to Miltiades. Consequently, military historians often include the siege in lists of the "decisive battles" of world history.) (Note: See also: September 3 - Saint Trivelius Theoktist (Khan Tervel of Bulgaria), who played an important role in defeating the Arabs during the Siege of Constantinople in 717–718.)
- Repose of Elder Anthony of Murom (Arsenius in schema) (1851), friend of St. Seraphim of Sarov.
- Repose of Archimandrite Hieron, founder of New Athos (1912)
- Repose of Blessed George Lazar of Văratec, Romania (1916)
- Repose of Abbess Ruffina of Harbin and Shanghai (1937)
- Repose of Venerable Elder Joseph the Hesychast, of New Skete, Mt. Athos (1959) (Note: On October 20, 2019, at the Protaton Church in Karyes on Mt. Athos, Ecumenical Patriarch Bartholomew announced that the glorification of four great 20th-century Athonite elders would soon proceed, including: Daniel of Katounakia (†1929); Ieronymos of Simonopetra (†1957); Joseph the Hesychast (†1959), and; Ephraim of Katounakia (†1998).; Commenting on the forthcoming glorification of Elder Joseph the Hesychast, Archbishop Elpidophoros of America said: "We are especially blessed in America because the founder of monasticism here, Elder Ephraim, made sure that he would bring us the sacred skull of Elder Joseph, who is also his spiritual father." He was officially glorified by the Holy Synod of the Ecumenical Patriarchate on March 9, 2020, to be commemorated each year on August 16/29, the day after the Dormition of the Most Holy Theotokos.) (Note: In 2019, the Holy Transfiguration Skete of the Holy Trinity-St. Jonas Monastery, in the village of Nescherov in the Kiev Province, established that the monastery would celebrate the elder’s memory on the Sunday nearest to the feast of the Dormition, according to the Abbot, His Eminence Archbishop Jonah of Obukhov (ru).) (Note: In December 2019, the foundation of the Katholikon of the new monastery of Venerable Joseph the Hesychast was laid by Bishop Prodromos of Toliaras and South Madagascar, possibly being the first church to be built in honor of the great 20th-century Athonite father.) (see: August 16)
- Repose of Metropolitan Augustinos (Kantiotis) of Florina (2010)

=== Icons ===
- Icons of the Theotokos' Dormition:

- 'Kiev Caves' (1073);
- 'Ovinov' (1425); (Note: This wonderworking icon is in the men's Monastery of St. Paisius (refer to the Kostroma Diocese). It received its name from the Boyar Ovinov, to whom it wonderfully appeared on the shore of Lake Galicia, near the city of Galicia in the princedom of Dmitri of the Don River. On the spot of its appearance Ovinov built the Temple of the Dormition of the Mother of God.)
- 'Pskov-Caves' (1472); (Note: It is found in Pskov Monastery of the Caves (refer to the Pskov Diocese), in which it was wonderfully revealed in 1472. Again it is glorified by miracles in 1523. See October 7.)
- 'Semigorodnaya' (15th century); (Note: This wonderworking icon representing the Dormition of the Mother of God was written by the Venerable Dionysius the Deaf in the 15th century. Brought by hermits from its monastery it was put into the parish church of the Semigorodny District, beyond the Dvinsk River. After the terrible plague that devastated the Vologda District in the 15th century, the church stood in desolation for about 150 years. In 1593, through a special vision, the Starets Julian, from the family of Beloozero noblemen, found the icon and constructed a monastery on the spot where the holy icon was found. Now the icon is in the Tupichev Monastery, Mogilev Diocese. The icon is celebrated on the day of the Descent of the Holy Spirit.)
- 'Seven Cities';
- 'Pyukhtitsa' (16th century);
- 'Bakhchisarai'.

- Her Icons:

- 'Atskurskaya' (1st century); (Note: This holy and wonderworking icon, by tradition, was wonderfully depicted on a board, in which the Mother of God put her figure, and was brought by the Holy Apostle Andrew the First-called to Iberia. Today it is in the Gaiane Cathedral, near Kutais. There the former Princess Saint Tamara had another Holy Icon of the Mother of God that today is called Gaiane.)
- 'Tsilkani' in Georgia (4th century); (Note: It is found in the Tsilkani Temple of the Theotokos, in Kartli (Georgia), written on a board from the Bethlehem manger and is contemporary with St. Nina, the enlightener of Georgia (January 14).)
- 'Vladimir-Rostov' (12th century); (Note: It was written in the 12th century by the Venerable Alypius of the Monastery of the Caves and now is found in the Rostov Dormition cathedral.)
- 'Mozdok' (13th century); (Note: The Mozdok Icon of the Mother of God, a copy of the Iversk icon, was sent in the 13th century by the holy empress Tamara as a gift to the newly-enlightened Christians of the Ossetian aul (village) of Mar'yam-Kadu. In 1768 this icon appeared remarkably on the banks of the Terek, not far from Mozdok. Bishop Gaii built a chapel for the icon. In 1796-1797 there was built at the place of the chapel a church in honour of the Uspenie (Dormition or Repose) of the MostHoly Mother of God, along which was soon founded a women's monastery (abolished together with the Mozdok diocese in 1799). At the end of the 19th century the inhabitants of Mozdok built a splendid church in honour of the Mozdok-Iversk icon of the Mother of God. The Mother of God has repeatedly rendered speedy aid to the believing through Her holy icon.)
- 'Gaenatskaya' (13th century);
- 'Chukhlom' (14th century); (Note: The Icon of the Mother of God of Galich-Chukhlomsk "Tenderness" [Umilenie] appeared in the year 1350 to the Monk Avraam of Galich, having come there from the north for ascetic deeds with the blessing of the Monk Sergei of Radonezh. On the wild shores of the Galich lake near the large mountain, hidden in the dense forest, he turned with prayer to the Mother of God, asking Her blessing for his labours. After prayer the monk sat at rest and suddenly there appeared on the nearby mountainside a bright light and he heard a voice: "Avraam, come up the mountain, where is set an icon of My Mother". The monk went up the mountain where the light shone, and indeed on a tree found an icon of the Mother of God with the Praeternal Infant. With tenderness and in gratitude to God, the holy ascetic took the revealed image and, strengthened by prayers to the MostHoly Mother of God, he built at the blessed place a chapel, in which he put the icon. After a certain length of time the Galich prince Dimitrii Feodorovich, having learned about a trip of the elder, turned to him with a request to bring the icon. The Monk Avraam rowed across the Galich lake in a boat and, accompanied by clergy and a throng of people, he took the wonderworking icon to the cathedral church of the city of Galich. On this day a large number of the sick were healed from this icon. When the Monk Avraam told about the appearance of the icon, the prince offered money for the building of a monastery. Soon there was built a church in honour of the Dormition of the MostHoly Mother of God, around which arose a monastery. Afterwards the Monk Avraam founded several more monasteries, the last being founded was the Chukhlomsk, not far from the city of Chukloma, – from the name of this monastery the ascetic was named "of Chukhlomsk", and the wonderworking icon took on the name "Galich-Chukhlomsk. The commemoration of this icon is also on 28 May and 15 August.)
- 'Surdyeg' (1530);
- 'Tupichev' (17th century);
- 'Blachernae' (Georgia). (Note: It is in the Quabtahev Monastery, in the middle of Kartli (Georgia).)

- Her Icons:

- 'Diasozousa';
- 'Chajnicke'.

- Icon of Sophia, the Wisdom of God (Novgorod).

== Icon gallery ==
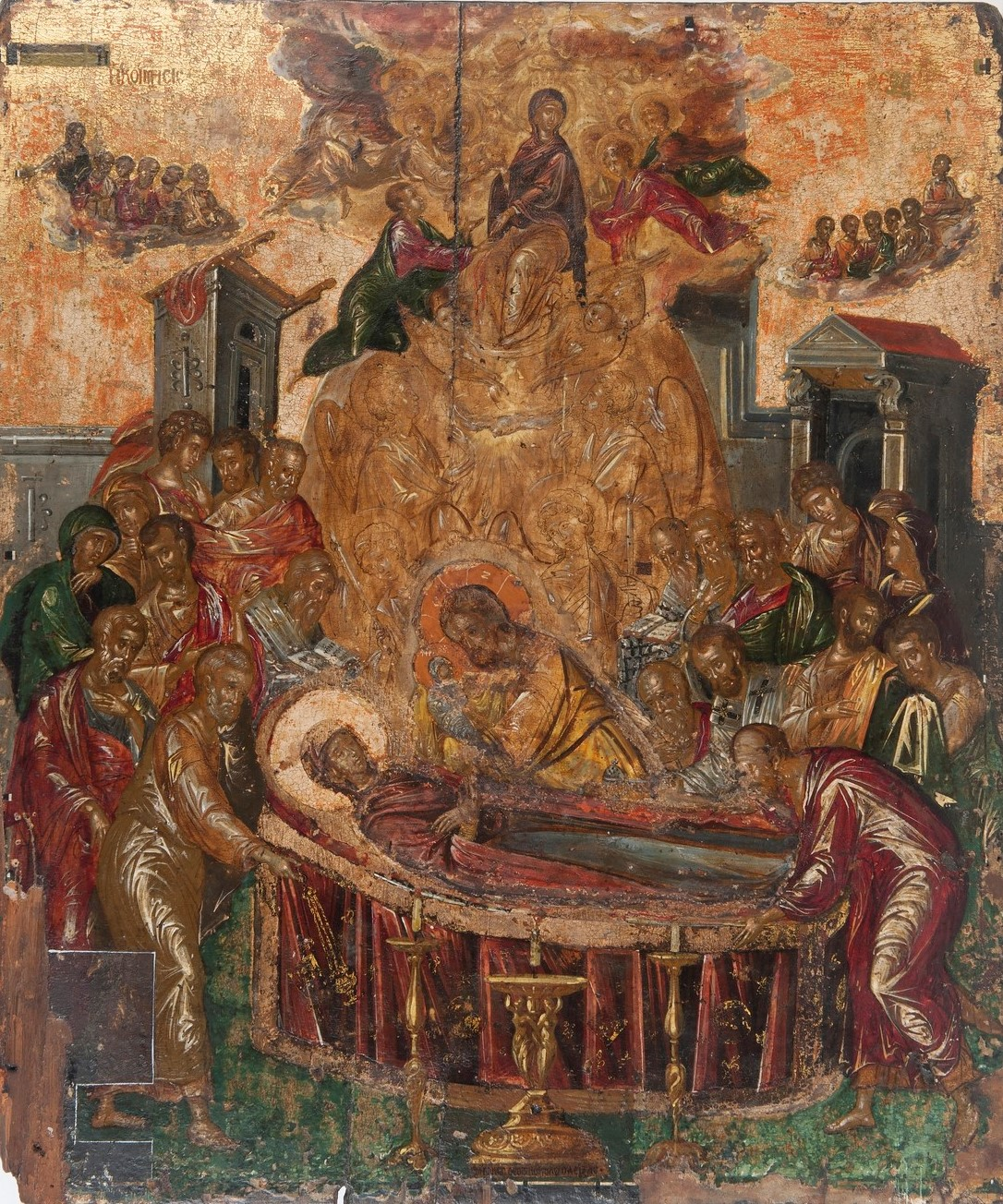
Icon of the Dormition of the Theotokos
(El Greco, 16th century).

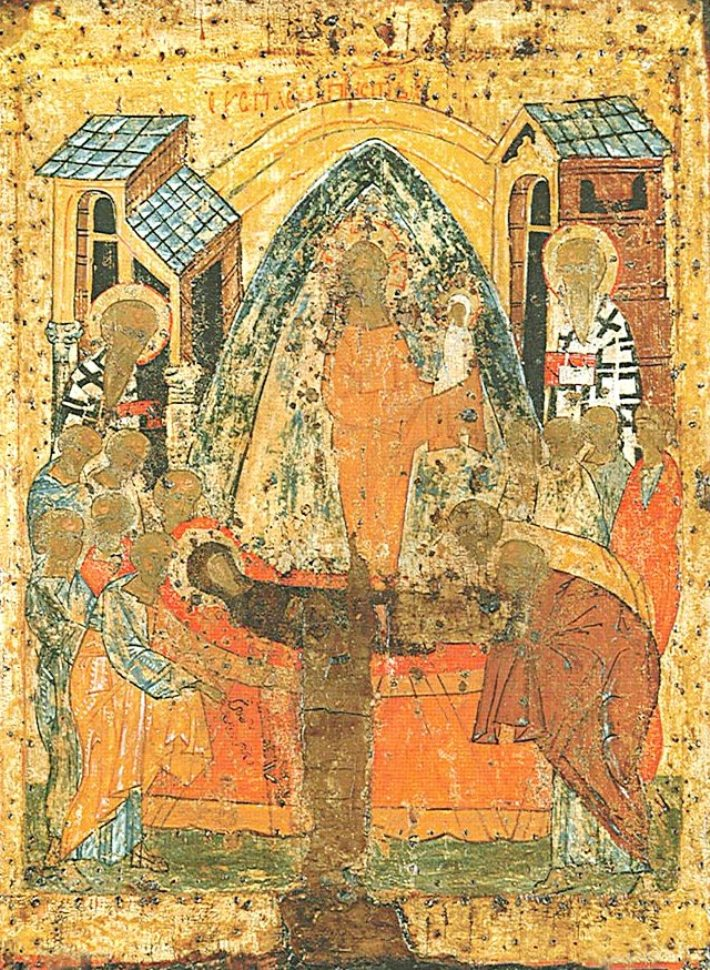
Dormition of the Theotokos Semigorodnyaya.

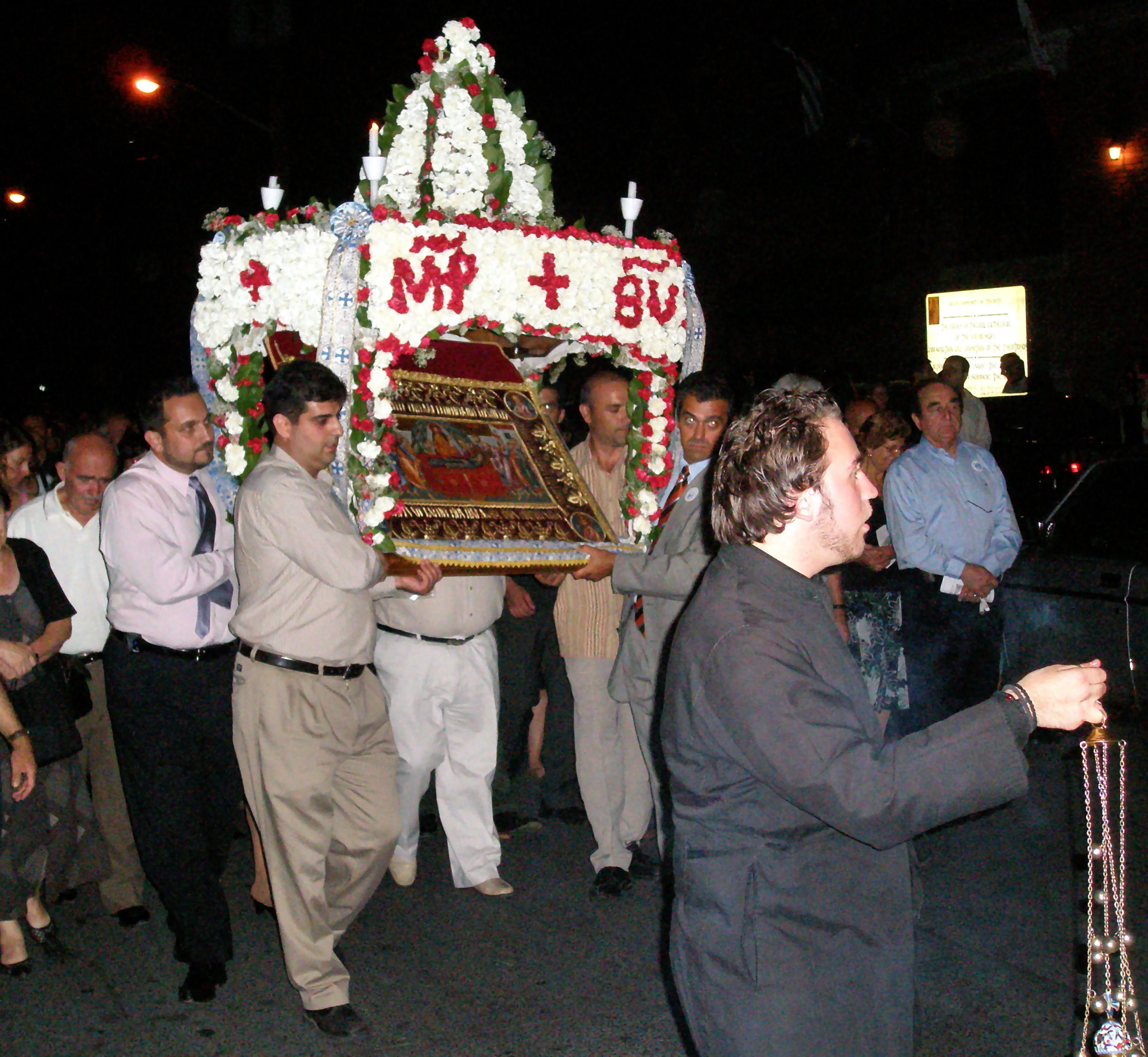
Outdoor procession of the Epitaphios of the Theotokos, Toronto (2007).

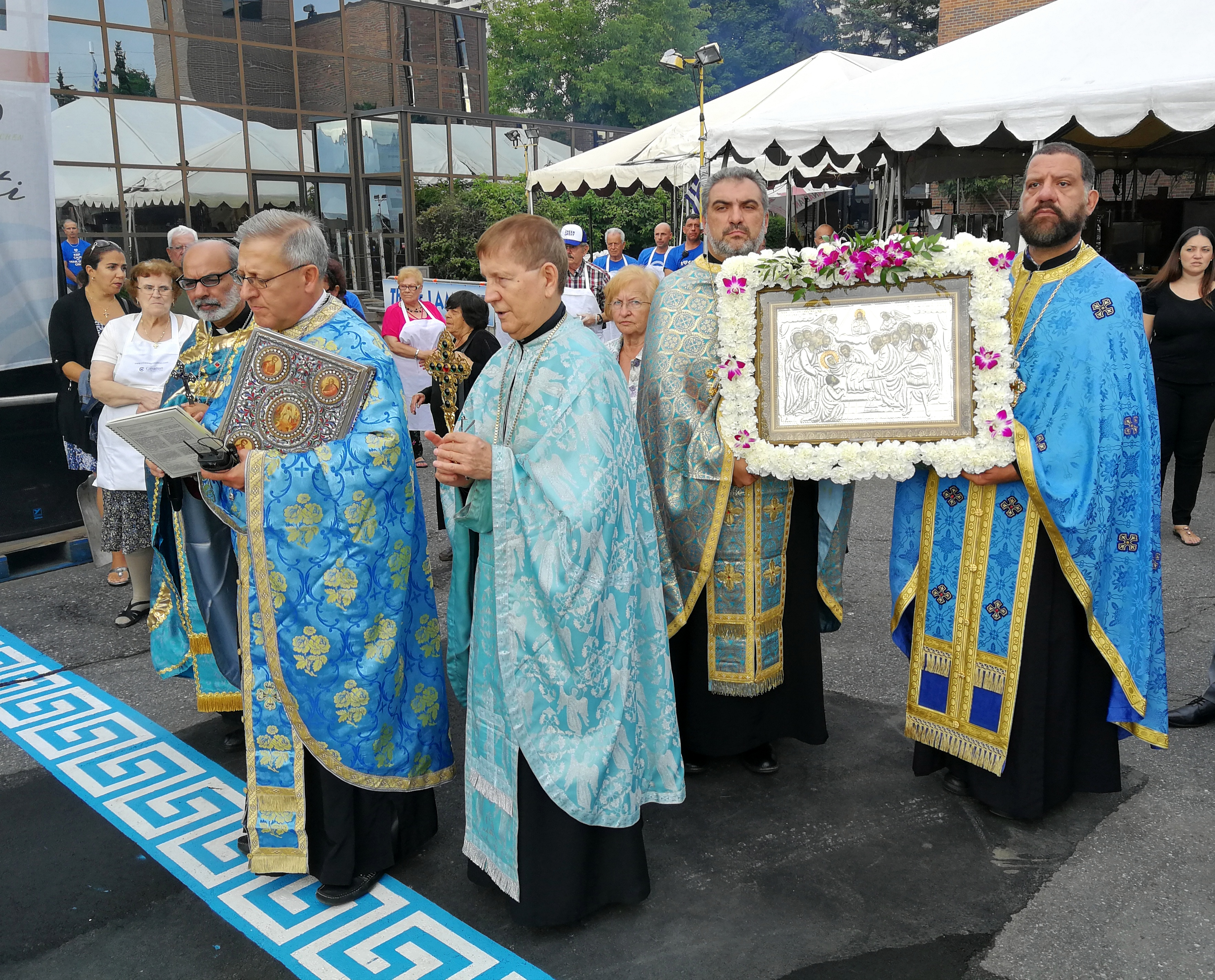
Procession of the Epitaphios of the Theotokos, Ottawa (2018).

== Sources ==
- August 15 / August 28. Orthodox Calendar (PRAVOSLAVIE.RU).
- August 28 / August 15. Holy Trinity Russian Orthodox Church (A parish of the Patriarchate of Moscow).
- August 15. OCA - The Lives of the Saints.
- The Autonomous Orthodox Metropolia of Western Europe and the Americas (ROCOR). St. Hilarion Calendar of Saints for the year of our Lord 2004. St. Hilarion Press (Austin, TX). p. 60.
- Menologion: The Fifteenth Day of the Month of August. Orthodoxy in China.
- August 15. Latin Saints of the Orthodox Patriarchate of Rome.
- The Roman Martyrology. Transl. by the Archbishop of Baltimore. Last Edition, According to the Copy Printed at Rome in 1914. Revised Edition, with the Imprimatur of His Eminence Cardinal Gibbons. Baltimore: John Murphy Company, 1916. p. 244.
- Rev. Richard Stanton. A Menology of England and Wales, or, Brief Memorials of the Ancient British and English Saints Arranged According to the Calendar, Together with the Martyrs of the 16th and 17th Centuries. London: Burns & Oates, 1892. pp. 394–395.

Greek Sources

- Great Synaxaristes: (in Greek) 15 ΑΥΓΟΥΣΤΟΥ. ΜΕΓΑΣ ΣΥΝΑΞΑΡΙΣΤΗΣ.
- (in Greek) Συναξαριστής. 15 Αυγούστου. ECCLESIA.GR. (H ΕΚΚΛΗΣΙΑ ΤΗΣ ΕΛΛΑΔΟΣ).

Russian Sources

- (in Russian) 28 августа (15 августа). Православная Энциклопедия под редакцией Патриарха Московского и всея Руси Кирилла (электронная версия). (Orthodox Encyclopedia - Pravenc.ru).
