= August 16 (Eastern Orthodox liturgics) =

Day in the Eastern Orthodox liturgical calendar

Eastern Orthodox liturgical calendar
August 15	August 16	August 17
August 16 O.S. ≍ August 29 N.S. August 16 N.S ≍ August 3 O.S.

An Eastern Orthodox cross

August 16 in Eastern Orthodox liturgical calendars is a feast day and a day of commemoration of saints and martyrs. Although some Orthodox churches use the Revised Julian Calendar and others use the traditional Julian calendar, the fixed commemorations for their respective August 16 are broadly the same, no matter which calendar is used. (Note: Despite the dates being the same, the days to which they refer typically differ by 13 days. The notation Old Style or O.S. is sometimes used to indicate a date in the traditional Julian Calendar (the "Old Calendar"). The notation New Style or N.S. indicates a date in the Revised Julian calendar (the "New Calendar").)

== Feasts ==
- Afterfeast of the Dormition. (Note: In today’s hymns at Vespers, the Mother of God is praised as "only created being to pass from earth to heaven in the flesh.")
- ''Translation of the "Image not made by hands" (Acheiropoieta) of Jesus Christ from Edessa to Constantinople (944) (Note: Third "Feast of the Savior" in August.)

== Saints ==
- Martyr Diomedes the Physician, of Tarsus in Cilicia (298) (Note: Name days celebrated today include: Diomedes (Διομήδης).) (Note: "At Nicaea, in Bithynia, St. Diomedes, physician, who underwent martyrdom for the faith of Christ by being beheaded, during the persecution of Diocletian.")
- Martyr Alcibiades, by fire. (Note: Name days celebrated today include: Alcibiades (Ἀλκιβιάδης).)
- 33 Martyrs of Palestine, by the sword.
- Venerable Chaeremon of Egypt (4th century)
- Saint Anthony the Stylite, of Martqopi, Georgia (6th century)
- Saint Makarios the Archbishop. (Note: His commemoration is noted in the Jerusalemitic Canonarion (p. 103), without any details about his life. He was likely one of the Archbishops of the throne of Jerusalem.)

== Pre-Schism Western saints ==
- Saint Ambrose, a centurion put to death under Diocletian, in Ferentino, central Italy (c. 303) (Note: "At Ferentino, in Campania, St. Ambrose, centurion. In the persecution of Diocletian, he was subjected to different kinds of tortures, and finally passing through fire without injury, was cast into the water, and thus reached the place of eternal rest.")
- Saint Titus, a Deacon martyred during the sack of Rome by the Goths, while distributing alms to the half-starved population (c. 410) (Note: "At Rome, St. Titus, deacon, who, when the city was taken by the Goths, was put to death by a barbarous tribune, whilst distributing money to the poor.")
- Saint Armagillus (Armel), founder of Saint-Armel-des-Boscheaux and Plou-Ermel (Ploermel) in Brittany (c. 550) (Note: Born in the south of Wales, he was a cousin of St Samson. A church in Cornwall was dedicated to him - St Erme. He went to Brittany and founded Saint-Armel-des-Boscheaux and Plou-Ermel (Ploermel).)
- Saint Eleutherius of Auxerre, Bishop of Auxerre from 532–561, who assisted at the Second, Third, Fourth and Fifth Councils of Orléans between 533 and 549 (561)
- Saint Simplician, a friend and advisor of St Ambrose, whom he succeeded as Bishop of Milan (400) (Note: "At Milan, the demise of St. Simplician, bishop, renowned by the testimony given of him by St. Ambrose and St. Augustine.")
- Saint Stephen of Hungary, King of Hungary (1038) (Note: On the death of his father, Geza (997), Stephen became King of Hungary. He had married Gisela, a sister of the Emperor Henry II in 995, and they set about enlightening their people. Stephen gradually welded the Magyars into national unity. He organised dioceses and founded monasteries (among them Pannonhalma, which still exists). The declining years of St Stephen were darkened by many misfortunes and difficulties, though he never ceased to be just, kind and merciful. To this day the Magyars consider him their greatest national saint and hero.) (see also: August 20 - East)

== Post-Schism Orthodox saints ==
- Saint Joachim, monk, of Osogovo and Sarandapor, Bulgarian monk (1105)
- Saint Eustathius II, archbishop of Serbia (1309)
- Venerable Nilus of Ereikoussa, nephew of Emperor Theodore Laskaris (c. 1335) (Note: Born Nikolaos Lascaris, son of John Lascaris, the brother of Emperor Theodore I Laskaris), monk, († late 13th / early 14th century), August 16.)
- Saint Romanus the Sinaite, of Djunisa, Serbia (14th century)
- Monk-martyr Christopher of Guria, Georgia, at Damascus (15th century)
- Saint Akakios, Bishop of Liti and Rendini (15th century) (Note: On November 27, 2013 the Sacred Metropolis of Lagada, Liti and Rendini organized the canonization of Saints Akakios and Damaskinos the Studite, who were both Bishops of Liti and Rendini in the 15th and 16th centuries. The feast of Saint Akakios will be celebrated on August 16th and Saint Damaskinos will be celebrated on November 27th. Metropolitan John of Lagada, Liti and Rendini submitted the names of these newly-glorified Saints to be included in the Synaxarion of the Orthodox Church, and with the approval of the Ecumenical Patriarchate this took place in the Sacred Church of Saint Athanasios in Liti. The Ecumenical Patriarchate and the Church of Greece were represented by Metropolitan Anthimos of Thessaloniki during the Hierarchical Divine Liturgy, who was among many hierarchs, priests, monks, government officials and faithful celebrating the first feast of Saint Damaskinos the Studite.)
- Venerable Diodorus, Abbot of Yuriev Monastery, Solovki (1633)
- Venerable New Monk-Martyr Nicodemus of Meteora (1551)
- Venerable Daniel of Meteora.
- Venerable Gerasimus of Kefalonia, the New Ascetic of Cephalonia (1579)
- Saint Raphael of Banat in Serbia (c. 1590)
- Venerable Timothy of Euripos (Timothy of Chalcedon), Archbishop, founder of the Pendeli Monastery (1590)
- New Martyr Stamatius of Demetrias, near Volos, at Constantinople (1680)
- New Great-martyr Apostolos of the town of St. Laurence, martyred at Constantinople (1686)
- New Martyrs King Constantin Brâncoveanu of Wallachia, his four sons Constantine, Stephen, Radu, Matthew, and his counsellor Ioannicius (1714) (Note: He ruled Wallachia beginning in 1688. He was a benefactor of many monasteries and churches and cared for the spiritual enlightenment of his people, and the development of printing. He also sought union with Orthodox Russia. In 1714, he was summoned to Constantinople by the sultan, where he was tortured to death for refusing to convert to Islam. His four sons Constantine, Stephan, Radu, Matthew and his counsellor Ianache were also martyred with him.) ( see also: May 21)
- Saint Maria Brâncoveanu (Doamna Marica Brâncoveanu), wife of St. Constantine Brâncoveanu (1729) (Note: See: (in Romanian) Marica Brâncoveanu. Wikipedia. (Romanian Wikipedia).)
- Saint Joseph of Văratec Monastery, Romania (1828)

=== New martyrs and confessors ===
- New Hieromartyr Stephen, Priest (1918)
- New Hieromartyrs priest Vladimir, and his brother Boris (1931)
- New Hieromartyr Alexander Sokolov, Priest, Virgin Martyr Anna Yezhov, and Martyr Jacob Gortinsky (1937)
- Venerable Elder Joseph the Hesychast, of New Skete, Mt. Athos (1959) (Note: On October 20, 2019, at the Protaton Church in Karyes on Mt. Athos, Ecumenical Patriarch Bartholomew announced that the glorification of four great 20th-century Athonite elders would soon proceed, including: Daniel of Katounakia (†1929); Ieronymos of Simonopetra (†1957); Joseph the Hesychast (†1959), and; Ephraim of Katounakia (†1998)).; Commenting on the forthcoming glorification of Elder Joseph the Hesychast, Archbishop Elpidophoros of America said: "We are especially blessed in America because the founder of monasticism here, Elder Ephraim, made sure that he would bring us the sacred skull of Elder Joseph, who is also his spiritual father." He was officially glorified by the Holy Synod of the Ecumenical Patriarchate on March 9, 2020, to be commemorated each year on August 16/29, the day after the Dormition of the Most Holy Theotokos.) (Note: In 2019, the Holy Transfiguration Skete of the Holy Trinity-St. Jonas Monastery, in the village of Nescherov in the Kiev Province, established that the monastery would celebrate the elder's memory on the Sunday nearest to the feast of the Dormition, according to the Abbot, His Eminence Archbishop Jonah of Obukhov (ru).) (Note: In December 2019, the foundation of the Katholikon of the new Monastery of Venerable Joseph the Hesychast was laid by Bishop Prodromos of Toliaras and South Madagascar, possibly being the first church to be built in honor of the great 20th-century Athonite father.)

== Other commemorations ==
- Translation of the relics (1798) of Martyrs Seraphim, Dorotheus, Jacob (James), Demetrius, Basil, and Sarantis, of Megara.
- Repose of Matrona (Popova), in monasticism Maria (1851), disciple of St. Tikhon of Zadonsk.

=== Icons ===
- Icon of the Most Holy Theotokos of Saint Theodore ("Feodorovskaya") of Kostroma (1239)
- Icon of the Theotokos of Port Arthur (1904)

== Icon gallery ==
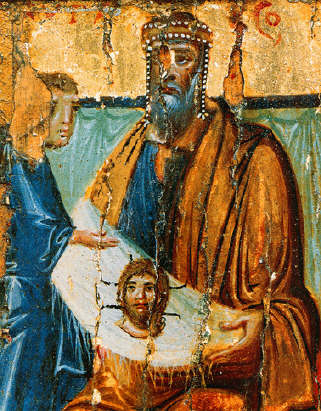
King Abgar with the Image of Edessa
(St Catherine's monastery, Mount Sinai.)

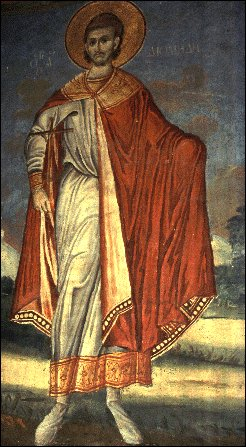
Saint Diomedes, fresco at Hilandar Monastery, Mt. Athos.

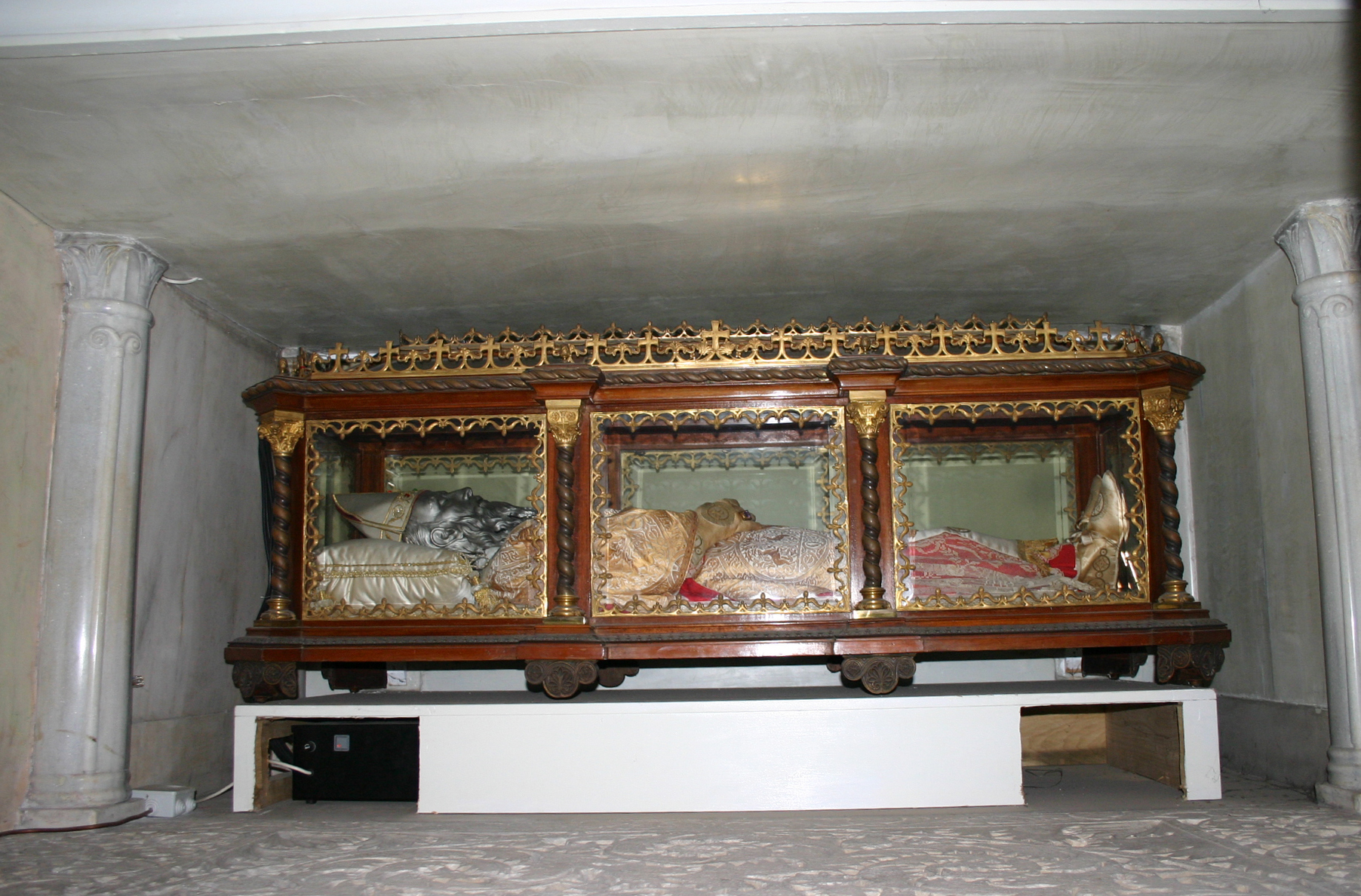
Reliquary of Saint Simplician.

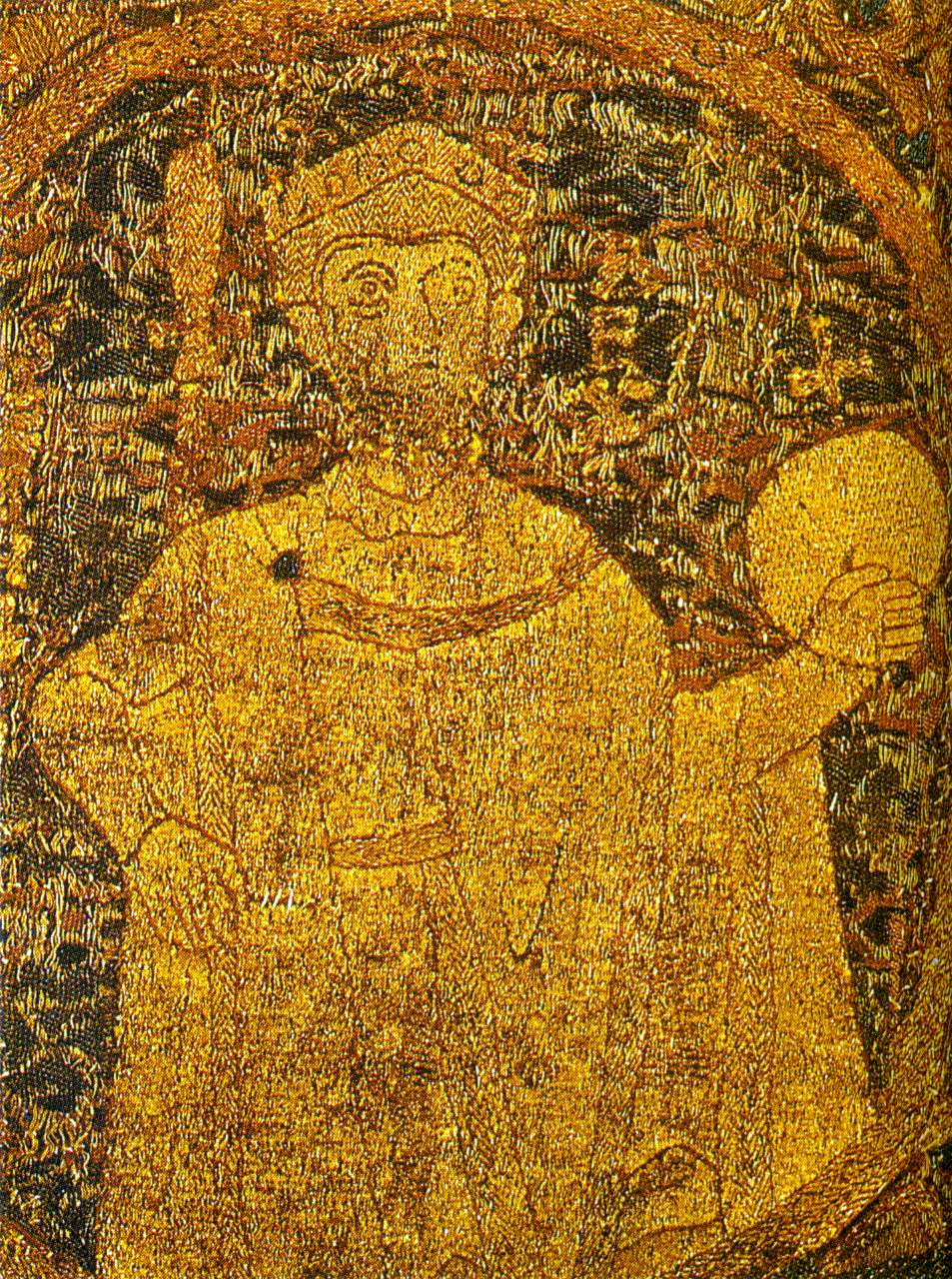
Portrayal of King Stephen I on the Hungarian coronation pall from 1031.

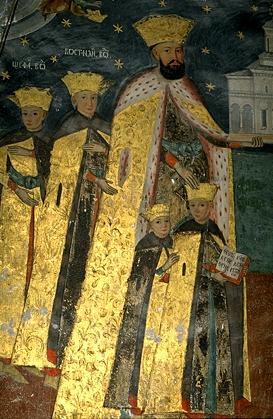
King Constantin Brâncoveanu of Wallachia, and his sons (Church mural in Hurezi Monastery).

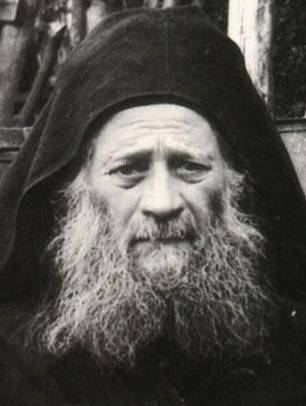
Venerable Elder Joseph (Spilaiotis) the Hesychast.

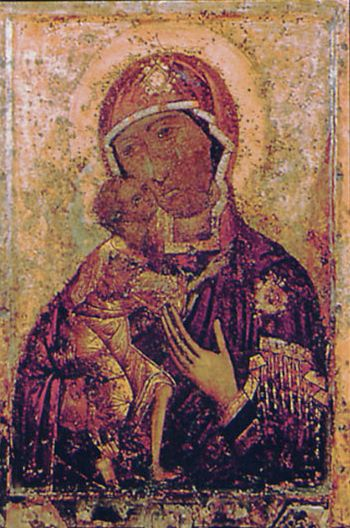
Theotokos of Saint Theodore ("Feodorovskaya").

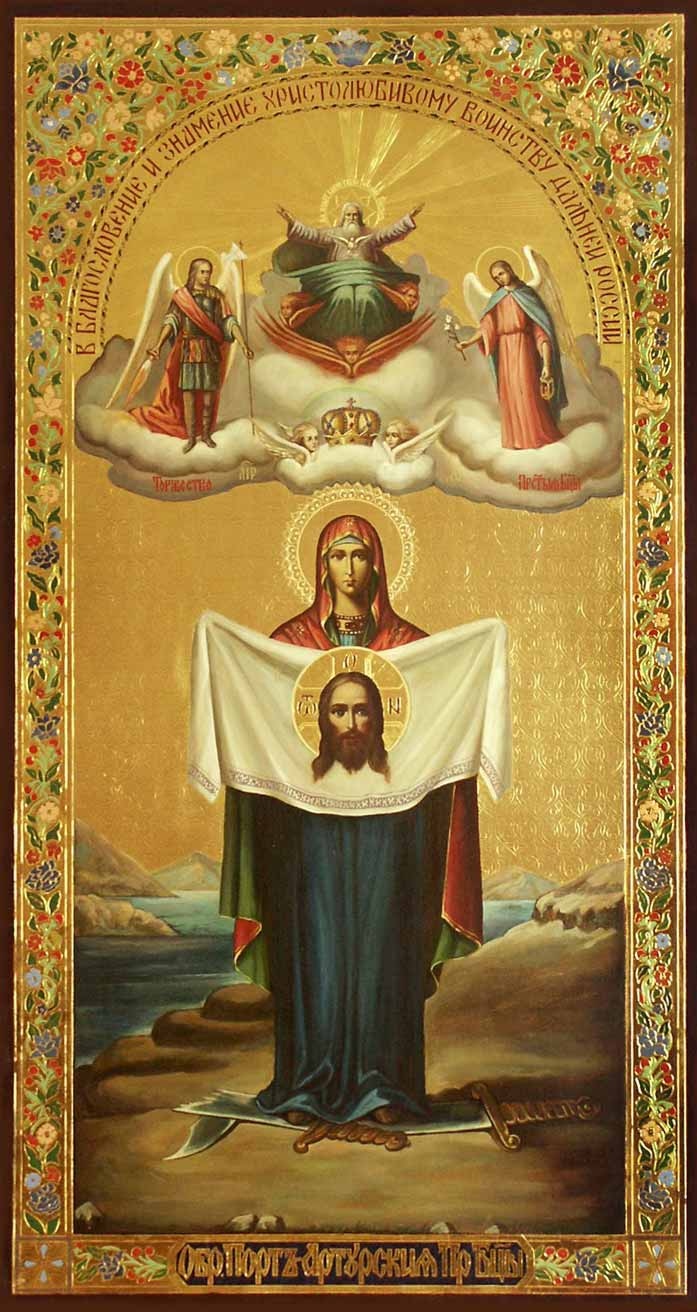
Theotokos of Port Arthur.

== Sources ==
- August 16 / August 29. Orthodox Calendar (PRAVOSLAVIE.RU).
- August 29 / August 16. Holy Trinity Russian Orthodox Church (A parish of the Patriarchate of Moscow).
- August 16. OCA - The Lives of the Saints.
- The Autonomous Orthodox Metropolia of Western Europe and the Americas (ROCOR). St. Hilarion Calendar of Saints for the year of our Lord 2004. St. Hilarion Press (Austin, TX). p. 60.
- Menologion: The Sixteenth Day Day of the Month of August. Orthodoxy in China.
- August 16. Latin Saints of the Orthodox Patriarchate of Rome.
- The Roman Martyrology. Transl. by the Archbishop of Baltimore. Last Edition, According to the Copy Printed at Rome in 1914. Revised Edition, with the Imprimatur of His Eminence Cardinal Gibbons. Baltimore: John Murphy Company, 1916. pp. 245-246.
- Rev. Richard Stanton. A Menology of England and Wales, or, Brief Memorials of the Ancient British and English Saints Arranged According to the Calendar, Together with the Martyrs of the 16th and 17th Centuries. London: Burns & Oates, 1892. pp. 395-396.

Greek Sources

- Great Synaxaristes: (in Greek) 16 ΑΥΓΟΥΣΤΟΥ. ΜΕΓΑΣ ΣΥΝΑΞΑΡΙΣΤΗΣ.
- (in Greek) Συναξαριστής. 16 Αυγούστου. ECCLESIA.GR. (H ΕΚΚΛΗΣΙΑ ΤΗΣ ΕΛΛΑΔΟΣ).

Russian Sources

- (in Russian) 29 августа (16 августа). Православная Энциклопедия под редакцией Патриарха Московского и всея Руси Кирилла (электронная версия). (Orthodox Encyclopedia - Pravenc.ru).
