= Joseph of Vatopedi =

Greek Cypriot Orthodox Christian monk

Elder Joseph of Vatopedi
- Born: Socrates; July 1, 1921; Giolou, Paphos District, Cyprus
- Hometown: Dhrousha, Paphos District, Cyprus
- Residence: Mount Athos
- Died: July 1, 2009 (aged 88); Vatopedi, Mount Athos
- Influences: Joseph the Hesychast
- Influenced: Ephraim of Vatopedi
- Tradition or genre: Athonite Monasticism, Hesychasm
- Major works: Elder Joseph the Hesychast: Struggles, Experiences, Teachings (1898-1959)

Elder Joseph of Vatopedi (or Joseph of Vatopaidi, Greek: Ιωσήφ ο Βατοπαιδινός, also known as Joseph the Younger; Paphos District, Cyprus, 1 July 1921 – Vatopedi, Mount Athos, 1 July 2009) was a Greek Cypriot Orthodox Christian monk and elder. He was one of the primary disciples of St. Joseph the Hesychast at Mount Athos. Joseph was also known as the spiritual father of Ephraim of Vatopedi, the current abbot of Vatopedi Monastery.

== Biography ==
He was born on 1 July 1921 at the courtyard of the Monastery of the Holy Unmercenaries in Giolou, Paphos District, Cyprus. His family consisted of Greek Cypriot peasants, and his mother's name was Evgenia. He was given the birth name Socrates and grew up in Drousia (also spelled Dhrousha), Paphos District, Cyprus, where he lived until the age or 15. In 1937, he became a novice monk at Stavrovouni Monastery and was tonsured there, where he received the monastic name Sophronios. There, he lived under the spiritual guidance of Elder Kyprianos until 1946.

In 1946, at the age of 25, the monk Sophronios moved to Little Saint Anne's Skete, Mount Athos to join Elder Joseph the Hesychast as an ascetic in his brotherhood. He received the name Joseph on 11 April 1948; as a result, he is also sometimes known as Joseph the Younger to distinguish him from his spiritual father, Elder Joseph the Hesychast. In 1951, he moved along with the brotherhood of Joseph the Hesychast to New Skete closer to the coast, due to their spiritual father's age.

He was a disciple of Joseph the Hesychast for 13 years, along with other disciples such as Father Theophylaktos, until Joseph the Hesychast's death in New Skete in 1959. He then built his own wooden hut at New Skete. At New Skete, he moved into the Cell of the Annunciation of the Theotokos in 1967. He then continued to reside at New Skete until 1975, when Ecumenical Patriarch Demetrios I of Constantinople invited him to become the spiritual father of the Monastery of Koutloumousiou, where he remained until 1977. Upon the advice of Paisios of Mount Athos, he then moved to the Monastery of the Precious Cross in Minthis, Cyprus in 1977 and was ordained as its abbot on 25 March 1978. There, Athanasios of Limassol, now Metropolitan, and Ephraim of Vatopedi, now an abbot, became one of the disciples in his brotherhood. Joseph then returned to Mount Athos on 26 October 1981 and reside in the Simonopetrite Cell of the Annunciation of the Theotokos in Kapsala. On 23 April 1982, he moved back to the Monastery of Koutloumousiou. In August 1983, he moved back into the Cell of the Annunciation of the Theotokos at New Skete, where more disciples joined his brotherhood.

On 23 April 1987, he relocated to Vatopedi Monastery, and his entire brotherhood also relocated to Vatopedi from New Skete in October 1989. He stayed at Vatopedi for the rest of his life. One of his disciples, Ephraim of Vatopedi, went on to become the spiritual head of Vatopedi Monastery.

His funeral was held on 1 July 2009 at the Monastery of Vatopedi. His remains were posthumously exhumed on 8 October 2021.

== Publications ==
Joseph of Vatopedi wrote 16 books. His biography of Elder Joseph the Hesychast has been translated into English.

- Elder Joseph of Vatopaidi (1999). Elder Joseph the Hesychast: Struggles, Experiences, Teachings (1898-1959). Mount Athos: The Great and Holy Monastery of Vatopaidi. 236 p. ISBN 9789607735126. (English translation of the original Greek by Elizabeth Theokritoff)

== See also ==
- Joseph the Hesychast
- Ephraim of Vatopedi
