= Arsenios the Cave Dweller =

Greek Orthodox Christian Athonite monk

Elder Arsenios the Cave Dweller
- Born: Anastasios; 1886; Samsun, Pontus (modern-day Turkey)
- Residence: Mount Athos
- Died: 15 September 1983; Mount Athos
- Influences: Joseph the Hesychast
- Tradition or genre: Athonite Monasticism, Hesychasm

Elder Arsenios the Cave Dweller (Greek: Γέρων Αρσένιος ο Σπηλαιώτης; Samsun, 1886 – Mount Athos, 1983) was a Pontic Greek Orthodox monk and elder. He was the primary companion of St. Joseph the Hesychast for about 40 years. The two of them led a small entourage of disciples.

== Biography ==
He was born as Anastasios in 1886 to Demetrius and Sotiria Galanopoulos, in Samsun, northern Anatolia. When he was 12 years old, he was taken by his family to the Caucasus due to the Turkish persecution of Pontic Greeks. As a result of his Pontic Greek background, he spoke Pontic Greek rather than standard Greek, as well as Turkish and Russian.

In his early days, Elder Arsenios served at the Church of the Holy Sepulchre and other holy shrines in Jerusalem. He later moved to Mount Athos, where he stayed for a few years at Stavronikita Monastery. During his time at Stavronikita, he met Joseph the Hesychast on the summit of Mount Athos during the Feast of the Transfiguration. From then on, Joseph the Hesychast became his lifelong companion. The two practiced hesychast asceticism on the slopes of Mount Athos. Since they often dwelled in caves, they were both known by the epithet "cave dweller" (Greek: Σπηλαιώτης); his companion Joseph the Hesychast is also known as "Joseph the Hesychast and Cave-Dweller".

Elder Arsenios lived with Joseph the Hesychast at the Skete of St. Basil for nearly 20 years, then moved down to live at Little St. Anne's Skete from 1938 to 1953. After 1953, they moved further down to the New Skete.

Several years after the death of Joseph the Hesychast in 1959, Elder Arsenios moved from the New Skete to a cell at Hilandar Monastery known as Burazeri, where he lived for 12 years. In 1980, he moved to Dionysiou Monastery.

He died on 15 September 1983 (or 2 September 1983 according to the Julian calendar).

== See also ==
- Joseph the Hesychast
