= New Skete =

New Skete may refer to:

- New Skete (Mount Athos), Greece
- New Skete (New York), United States
