= Katounakia =

Skete in Mount Athos, Greece

- Σκήτη Κατουνάκια
- Location within Mount Athos

Site
- Location: Mount Athos; Greece
- Coordinates: 40°7′22″N 24°17′48″E
- Public access: Men only

Katounakia (Greek: Σκήτη Κατουνάκια) is an Eastern Orthodox skete of the community of Mount Athos that is subordinate to the Great Lavra. The skete is located between Little Saint Anne's Skete and Karoulia. The skete consists of 22 cells in which about 35 monks live. The cell of Danieleon, which employs some of the best icon painters at Mount Athos, is located in the skete.

== History ==
The name comes from the Greek word κατούνα, meaning 'military camp' or a narrow, sheltered place. The settlement dates back to the beginning of the 18th century.

In 1881, St. Daniel Katounakiotis of Smyrna built his hut in Katounakia, which was the foundation for the present-day hermitage of the brotherhood of the Danielaeans. Saint Daniel practiced the art of hagiography and handed it over to the brotherhood, which continues to practice it to this day.

In 1903, it consisted of 19 Greek cells. Today, it consists of 22 hesychast cells, the oldest of which, the Annunciation and the Assumption, were established in 1852.

Katounakia's largest cell, Danieleon, belongs to a brotherhood of Athonite icon painters and psalters. The cell was founded by and named after the monk Daniel Katounakiotis.

The skete's chapel is dedicated to the Athonite fathers. Daniel Katounakiotis, the monks Ignatius the Blind (d. 1927), Gerasimos Menaios (d. 1957) also lived in Katounakia during the 20th century. Elder Ephraim of Katounakia (d. 1998), who spent his entire life in strict asceticism in a cell at Katounakia, was canonized as a saint two decades after his death. (Note: On October 20, 2019, at the Protaton Church in Karyes on Mt. Athos, Ecumenical Patriarch Bartholomew announced the glorification of four great 20th-century Athonite elders would soon proceed, including: Daniel of Katounakia (†1929); Ieronymos of Simonopetra (†1957); Joseph the Hesychast (†1959), and; Ephraim of Katounakia (†1998).)

== Relics and pilgrimage sites ==
In Katounakia, the cells, skulls, and other relics of hesychast ascetics such as Daniel of Katounakia and Ephraim of Katounakia can be visited by pilgrims.

The Daniilaioi Monastic Brotherhood (Ιερά Μοναστική Κοινότης Δανιηλαίων; or Ιερά Ησυχαστήριον Δανιηλαίων), originally founded by Daniel of Katounakia, has a building in Katounakia (40.1255313°N 24.2967056°E).

== Notable people ==
- Daniel of Katounakia
- Ephraim of Katounakia
- Joseph the Hesychast
- Paisios of Mount Athos
