= Lectionary 55 =

Lectionary ℓ 55
- New Testament manuscript
- Text: Evangelistarion, Apostolos
- Date: 1602
- Script: Greek
- Now at: State Historical Museum
- Size: 20.5 cm by 16.5 cm
- Hand: wretchedly written

Lectionary 55, designated by siglum ℓ 55 (in the Gregory-Aland numbering), is a Greek manuscript of the New Testament, on paper leaves. It is dated by a colophon to the year 1602.

== Description ==
The codex is an Euchologium with lessons from the Old Testament and 107 lessons from the New Testament. It is a lectionary (Evangelistarion, Apostolos), on 581 paper leaves (20.5 cm by 16.5 cm). It is written in Greek minuscule letters, in one column per page, in 18-24 lines per page.

== History ==
The manuscript was written in Venice in 1602. It came from the monastery of Vatopedi on the Athos. The manuscript was examined by Matthaei.

The manuscript is sporadically cited in the critical editions of the Greek New Testament (UBS3).

Currently the codex is located in the State Historical Museum, (V. 264, S. 454) in Moscow.

== See also ==
- List of New Testament lectionaries
- Biblical manuscript
- Textual criticism
