= Uncial 063 =

Uncial 063, 0117
- New Testament manuscript
- Text: Luke 16 — John 6 †
- Date: 9th century
- Script: Greek
- Now at: Vatopedi, BnF, State Historical Museum
- Size: 26 x 19 cm
- Type: Byzantine text-type
- Category: V

Uncial 063 (in the Gregory-Aland numbering), ε 64 (Soden), is a Greek uncial manuscript of the New Testament, dated paleographically to the 9th century.

== Description ==
The codex contains a part of the Luke 16 — John 6, on 20 parchment leaves (26 cm by 19 cm). It is written in two columns per page, 29 lines per page.

It uses breathings and accents. The text is divided according to the κεφαλαια (chapters), whose numbers are given at the margin, and according to the Ammonian Sections, (no references to the Eusebian Canons). It contains lectionary markings at the margin (for liturgical service).

Contents
Luke 16:19-18:14; 18:36-19:44; 20:19-23; 20:36-21:20; 22:6-30; 22:53-24:20.41-fin.;
John 1:1-3:34; 4:45-6:29.

The Greek text of this codex is a representative of the Byzantine text-type. Aland placed it in Category V. It has some special readings.

It was not examined by the Claremont Profile Method.

In John 1:28 it reads ἐν Βηθανίᾳ ἐγένετο.

== History ==
It is dated by the INTF to the 9th century.

The codex 063 was divided and now is located in several different places. 14 leaves at the Vatopedi monastery (1219), 6 leaves at the State Historical Museum (V. 137, 181).

Two other leaves of the same codex, registered as 0117 (Gregory-Aland). They were brought from the East by Emmanuel Miller. Currently they are held at the Bibliothèque nationale de France (Suppl. Gr. 1155, II).

== See also ==
- List of New Testament uncials
- Textual criticism
