= Uncial 0102 =

- New Testament manuscript
- Text: Gospel of Luke 3-4; 21 †
- Date: 7th-century
- Script: Greek
- Now at: Vatopedi, Bibliothèque nationale de France
- Size: 30 x 23 cm
- Type: Alexandrian text-type
- Category: II

Uncial 0102 (in the Gregory-Aland numbering), ε 42 (Soden), is a Greek uncial manuscript of the New Testament. It is dated paleographically to the 7th century.

== Description ==
The codex contains a small part of the Gospel of Luke 3:23-4:43; 21:4-18 on five parchment leaves (30 cm by 23 cm). The text is written in two columns per page, 24 lines per page. The letters are large and leaning to the right. Liturgical markings were added by a later hand.

Currently it is dated by the INTF to the 7th century.

The codex was divided, three of its leaves now are held at the Vatopedi monastery (1219) at Athos peninsula. These leaves contain text of Luke 3:23-4:2; 4:30-43; 21:4-18. Two other leaves with text of Luke 4:3-29 are held in the Bibliothèque nationale de France (Suppl. Gr. 1155,I), at Paris. The leaves are in a fragmentary condition. It was examined and described by Henri Omont.

From the same manuscript probably originated another leaves now catalogued as Uncial 0138. Hermann von Soden designated it as ε 75. 0138 contains Gospel of Matthew 21:24-24:15. It is held in the Protatou monastery (56,8 ff.), at Athos peninsula.

The Greek text of this codex is a representative of the Alexandrian text-type. Aland placed it in Category II, it means it has some alien readings.

== See also ==
- List of New Testament uncials
- Textual criticism
