= Joseph the Hesychast =

Greek Orthodox Christian Athonite monk

Saint Joseph the Hesychast
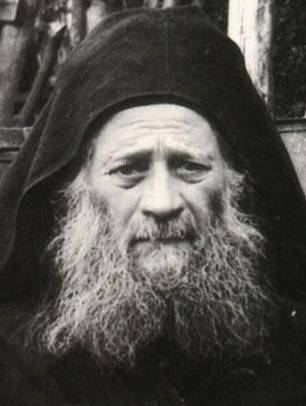
- Portrait of Saint Joseph the Hesychast

Venerable Hesychast
- Born: Fragkiskos Kottis; 12 February 1897; Lefkes, Paros, Greece
- Residence: Mount Athos
- Died: 15 August 1959 (aged 62); Mount Athos, Greece
- Venerated in: Eastern Orthodox Church
- Beatified: 20 October 2019, Karyes, Mount Athos by Bartholomew I of Constantinople
- Canonized: 9 March 2020, Mount Athos by Ecumenical Patriarchate of Constantinople
- Major shrine: Tomb of St. Joseph the Hesychast at New Skete, Mount Athos
- Feast: 16 August
- Influences: Daniel of Katounakia
- Influenced: Arsenios the Cave Dweller; Ephraim of Arizona; Ephraim of Katounakia; Joseph of Vatopedi
- Tradition or genre: Athonite Monasticism, Hesychasm

Saint Joseph the Hesychast (Greek: Άγιος Ιωσήφ ο Ησυχαστής; born Fragkiskos Kottis, Greek: Φραγκίσκος Κόττης; 12 February 1897 – 15 August 1959) was a Greek Orthodox monk and elder who led a small group of monks at Mount Athos. He was canonized as a saint by the Ecumenical Patriarchate of Constantinople in 2020. His feast day is celebrated on 16 August.

== Early life ==
He was born Fragkiskos (Francis) Kottis (Greek: Φραγκίσκος Κόττης) on 12 February 1897 in Lefkes, a village on the Greek Aegean island of Paros. His parents were Georgios and Maria Kottis. He was the third of seven children in his family. When he was a child, Francis' father died, leaving his mother Maria to care for the family. Until his teenage years, he remained in the village, helping his mother and his family with various tasks for a living. He attended school until second grade. He also served in the Greek Navy. At approximately the age of 23, he worked as a vendor in Piraeus and Athens. While in Athens, he began to read about the lives of saints and ascetics. On Mount Penteli, he would stay up all night praying in caves or even on trees, similar to the medieval anchorites and stylites. Afterwards, he went to Mount Athos to become a monk.

== Monastic life ==
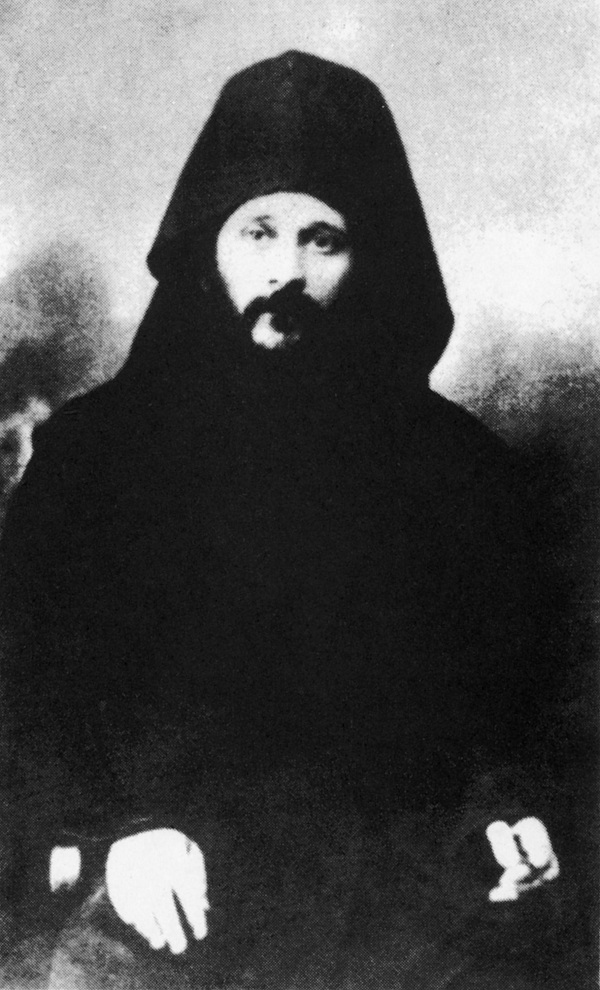
Joseph the Hesychast as a young monk

In 1921, his first destination was Katounakia in the Mount Athos region. He joined the Danielaioi Brotherhood and stayed for a time in their skete under the spiritual guidance of Daniel Katounakiotis of Smyrna, the founder of the brotherhood. He left with the blessing of Daniel as he moved on to pursue a more ascetic lifestyle.

A year later, he ascended Mount Athos on the Feast of the Transfiguration, celebrated at the summit of Mount Athos in the Chapel of the Transfiguration. There, he met Arsenios the Cave Dweller (1886–1983), a monk at Stavronikita Monastery who would later become his disciple. Looking for a disciplined elder who would help him with asceticism, in 1924 he went with Arsenios to the Cell of the Annunciation of the Virgin Mary in Katounakia, to become followers of the two elders Ephraim and Joseph. On 31 August 1925, at the age of 28, he was given the name Joseph of Vigla in the cave of Athanasius the Athonite. In mid-1928, Joseph and Arsenios decided to move to a more mountainous and remote area around the Skete of St. Basil After about ten years of intensive spiritual practice, fasting, and prayer with Arsenios, as well as many experiences of divine grace, Monk Joseph agreed to accompany and become the spiritual guide of any monk who would follow him. During the period of his stay in the Skete of St. Basil, Joseph Kottis was also the spiritual guide of Ephraim Katounakiotis. During the same period, Joseph's brother, Nicholas Kottis, left the secular world to join his brother's group as a monk, and took the name Athanasios.

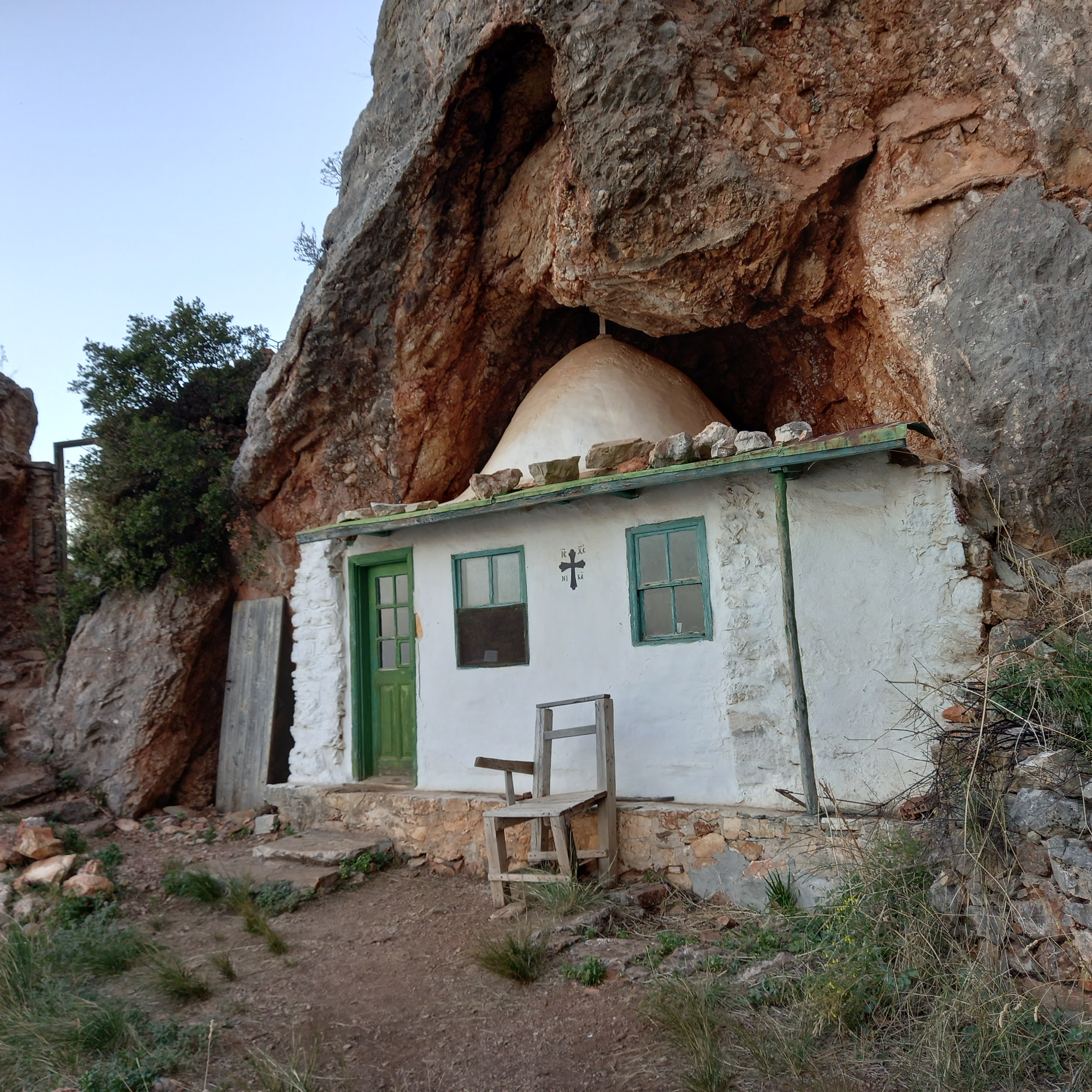
The hut or cell of Joseph the Hesychast near Little St. Anne's Skete

In January 1938, the small group led by Joseph went to Little St. Anne's Skete, where they settled in caves near a chapel of Timios Prodromos, which they had built themselves. His first disciple during the group's stay at Little St. Anne's Skete was the Cypriot monk Sophronios, who took the name Joseph and later served as elder of the Monastery of Vatopedi on Mount Athos until his death in 2009. Another member of the group was Ephraim, later abbot of the Monastery of Philotheou on Mount Athos, and also the founder of over 19 monasteries in the United States and Canada. Another one of Joseph's disciples was Haralambos of Dionysiou, who would later become the abbot of Dionysiou Monastery. In 1953, Joseph's group settled in the New Skete of Athos, which was the final skete that he stayed at during his lifetime.

== Death and burial ==
A month before his burial, he claimed to have been informed of the exact time by the Virgin Mary herself.

On 14 August 1959, he attended the vigil in honor of the Dormition of the Virgin Mary and took the Blessed Sacrament. He died from heart failure on 15 August. He was laid to rest that same day in a tomb in the chapel of the Annunciation of the Virgin Mary in the New Skete of Mount Athos, near the Tower of the Skete. His relics are kept in various monasteries, including St. Anthony's Greek Orthodox Monastery in Florence, Arizona, United States.

Today, his tomb, enshrined in a chapel, can be visited at the northern edge of New Skete on Mount Athos. The hermitage of Saint Joseph the Hesychast, a hut on a cliff overlooking the sea, is located in a steep area with dense vegetation that is just north of Little Saint Anne's Skete.

== Canonization ==
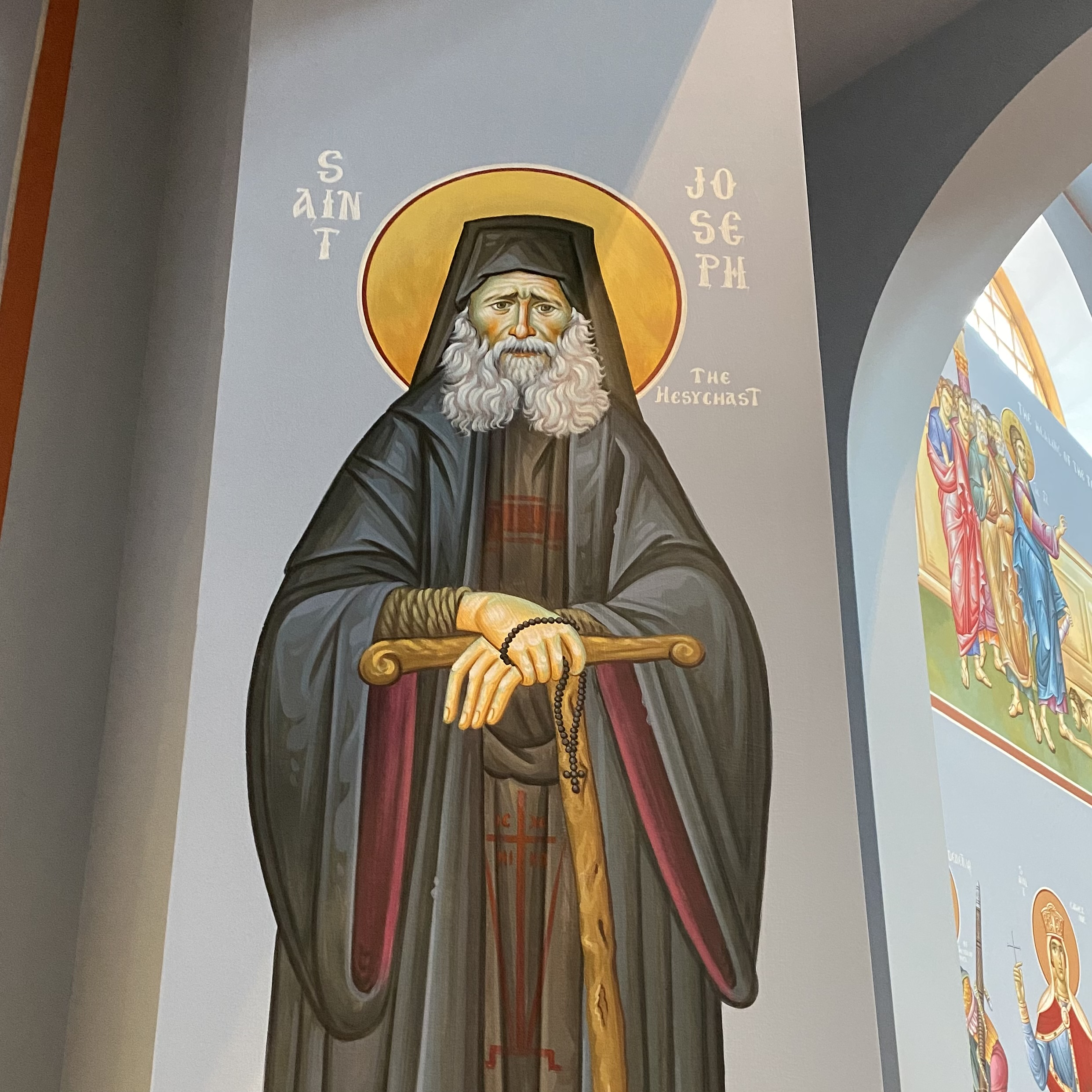
Icon of Saint Joseph in an Orthodox parish in the United States

On 20 October 2019, Ecumenical Patriarch Bartholomew I of Constantinople announced the glorification of Joseph the Hesychast at Karyes, Mount Athos. His remains are kept in Vatopedi Monastery. On 9 March 2020, the Holy and Sacred Synod of the Ecumenical Patriarchate, by the Patriarchal and Synodal Act, inscribed Elder Joseph in the Holy Calendar of the Orthodox Church.

== Legacy ==
His teachings and spiritual work are preserved in 65 letters published by the Monastery of Philotheou, as well as in various books. He is also known for his mystical approach to advocating for the use of the Jesus Prayer at Mount Athos. Joseph the Hesychast played a key role in the repopulation of six monasteries at Mount Athos, as well as many nunneries in Greece.

His life and spiritual legacy are presented in a documentary film titled Elder Joseph the Hesychast (2019), which was produced, written and edited by the Monastery of Vatopedi. The documentary won four awards from the jury at the London Greek Film Festival in London.

== See also ==
- Arsenios the Cave Dweller
- Daniel Katounakiotis
- Joseph of Vatopedi
- Paisios of Mount Athos
- Silouan the Athonite

== Sources ==
- Mesa Potamos Kyprou, Holy Monastery of Timios Prodromos (2018). Saint Elder Joseph the Hesychast. Athens: Athos Ltd. (Stamouli SA). ISBN 978-960-495-256-4.
- Lekkos, Evangelos P. (2011). Elder Joseph the Hesychast. Athens: Saitis. ISBN 978-960-487-021-9.
- Elder Ephraim Philotheitis (2008). My Elder Joseph the Hesychast and Cave Dweller (1897-1959). Arizona, U.S. ISBN 978-960-93-0580-8.
- Mantzaridēs, Geōrgios I.; Cyprus. Mētropolis Lemesou; Hiera Megistē Monē Vatopediou; Kentro Hellēnikou kai Orthodoxou Politismou; Diorthodoxo Epistēmoniko Synedrio; Diorthodoxo Epistēmoniko Synedrio (2007). Gerontas Iōsēph ho Hēsychastēs, Hagion Oros-Philokalikē empeiria : Praktika Diorthodoxōn Epistēmonikōn Synedriōn Athēnōn (22-24 Oktōvriou 2004) kai Lemesou (21-23 Oktōvriou 2005) (in Greek). Hagion Oros. ISBN 978-960-7735-40-9. OCLC 429161181.
- Triantaphyllos, Prot. Georgios (2007). Elder Joseph the Hesychast, the Neptic Father and Teacher. Paros: Panagia Myrtidiotissa Holy Hermitage. ISBN 9789608815759.
- Elder Joseph of Vatopaidi (1999). Elder Joseph the Hesychast: Struggles, Experiences, Teachings (1898-1959). Mount Athos: The Great and Holy Monastery of Vatopaidi. 236 p. ISBN 9789607735126. (English translation of the original Greek by Elizabeth Theokritoff)
