= Daniel of Katounakia =

Greek Orthodox monk

Saint Daniel of Katounakia
- Born: Dimitrios Dimitriadis; 1846; Smyrna (modern-day İzmir, Turkey)
- Residence: Mount Athos, Greece
- Died: 8 September 1929; Mount Athos, Greece
- Venerated in: Eastern Orthodox Church
- Canonized: 9 March 2020, Mount Athos by Ecumenical Patriarchate of Constantinople
- Feast: September 7
- Influenced: Joseph the Hesychast
- Tradition or genre: Athonite Monasticism, Hesychasm

Saint Daniel Katounakiotis of Smyrna (Greek: Δανιήλ Κατουνακιώτης ο Σμυρναίος, also known as Daniel of Katounakia; born Dimitrios Dimitriadis, Greek: Δημήτριος Δημητριάδης) (Smyrna, 1846 – Mount Athos, 8 September 1929) was a Greek Orthodox monk who lived on Mount Athos. He was canonized as a saint by the Ecumenical Patriarchate of Constantinople in 2020. His feast is commemorated on September 7.

Today, he is known as the founder of the Danielaioi Brotherhood, which is still currently located in Katounakia at the southernmost tip of the Athos peninsula.

== Early years ==
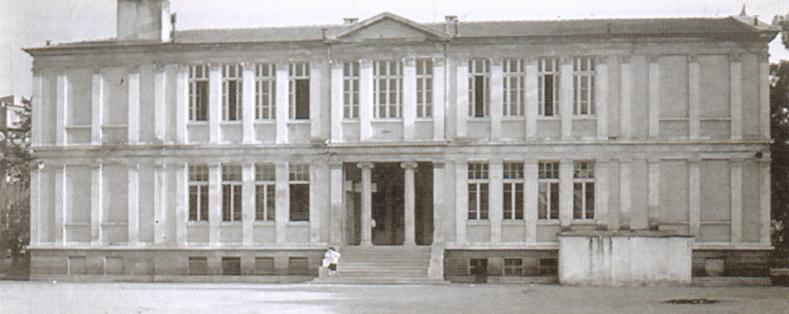
The Evangelical School of Smyrna where Saint Daniel Katounakiotis studied

He was born in Smyrna (now İzmir in western Turkey) in 1846. He was the youngest son of a large family and graduated with honors from the Evangelical School of Smyrna, the educational institution of the Greek community of Smyrna.

When he was 19, desiring to become a monk, he visited various monasteries in Peloponnesia and on the islands of Hydra, Tinos, Paros, and Ikaria, where he met various Orthodox elders.

== St. Panteleimon Monastery ==
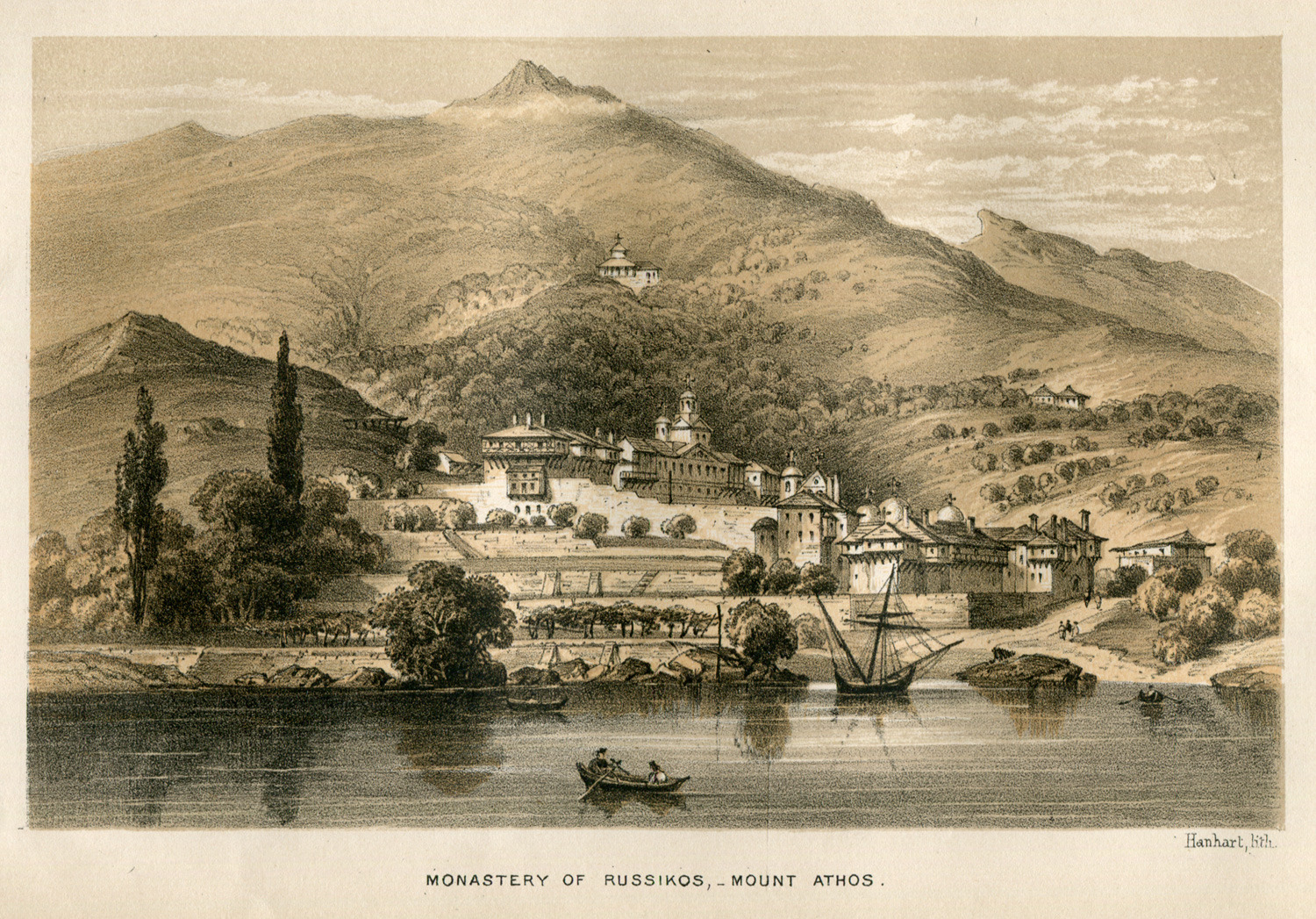
St. Panteleimon Monastery (1864 photo), where Daniel became a monk in 1866

In Paros, Daniel met St. Arsenios of Paros (Greek: Αρσένιος της Πάρου or Αρσένιος o εν Πάρω; d. 1877). In response to the young Dimitrios' request to stay and practice with him, St. Arsenios of Paros recommended him to go to the then famous and flourishing St. Panteleimon Monastery on Mount Athos. He became a monk at St. Panteleimon Monastery in 1866, where he was held in esteem by the Greek abbot of the monastery and the other, mostly Greek monks. The monk Daniel, during this period, served as secretary of the monastery.

From 1874 to 1875, Russian monks tried to control St. Panteleimon Monastery, resulting in quarrels and tensions. As a result, the Greek monks left, among them the monk Daniel who moved to Little St. Anne's Skete.

== In Thessaloniki ==
Due to the tensions at St. Panteleimon Monastery, Daniel was summoned to the Ecumenical Patriarchate and was punished with permanent removal from Mount Athos. He was sent to Metropolitan Joachim of Thessaloniki (who later became Ecumenical Patriarch Joachim III of Constantinople) who, recognizing the injustice, suggested that he stay in a monastery of the Metropolis of Thessaloniki. Thus, Daniel chose the Monastery of St. Anastasia Pharmakolytria (Greek: Μονή Αγίας Αναστασίας Φαρμακολύτριας) in Vasilika, Thessaloniki. There, Daniel contributed to the revitalization of the monastery by introducing the Athonite rite in fasting and services. Since the Russian monks' deconsecration of St. Panteleimon Monastery and the successful appointment of the Russian Abbot Makarios, Daniel's exile was overturned. He was allowed return to Mount Athos, but not to St. Panteleimon Monastery.

== Return to Mount Athos ==
Returning to Mount Athos, he stayed for about five years at the Holy Monastery of Vatopedi, where he was said to have been miraculously cured of renal colic. He was sent from the Monastery of Vatopedi to his hometown, Smyrna, to settle the affairs of the monastery's metochion there. He remained in Smyrna for nine months. The Metropolitan Meletius of Smyrna was impressed by Daniel, and offered him the opportunity to remain in Smyrna and be ordained bishop as his assistant. However, Daniel refused, as he wanted to live a contemplative life, and thus returned to Mount Athos. In 1881, he established his hut in Katounakia on Mount Athos, which was the foundation for the present-day retreat of the Danieleian (or Danielaioi/Daniilei) Brotherhood in Katounakia.

Daniel practiced the art of hagiography and handed it down to his brotherhood, which still practices it today. He is also known for his essays and hundreds of letters on spiritual and theological matters.

Daniel was spiritually connected with St. Nectarios of Pentapolis, with Elder Philotheos Zervakos, and with Elder Theodosia (Abbess of Kechrovouni Monastery in Tinos), the writer Alexandros Moraitidis (later Monk Andronikos), whom Daniel helped in his monastic orientation, and with many other spiritual figures of his time. In the 1920s, Joseph the Hesychast became his disciple.

One of his disciples was Elder Kallinikos the Vigilant (also known as Kallinikos the Hesychast; died 1930).

He died on 8 September 1929, on the feast of the Nativity of the Virgin Mary.

== Canonization ==
On 20 October 2019, at the Protaton Church in Karyes on Mt. Athos, Ecumenical Patriarch Bartholomew announced the beatification of four great 20th-century Athonite elders, including:

- Daniel of Katounakia (died 1929)
- Ieronymos of Simonopetra (died 1957)
- Joseph the Hesychast (died 1959)
- Ephraim of Katounakia (died 1998)

He was canonized as a saint on 9 March 2020, along with the three other monks listed above.

== See also ==
- Joseph the Hesychast
