= Little St. Anne's Skete =

Skete on Mount Athos

- Σκήτη μικρή Αγία Άννα
- Location within Mount Athos
- Interactive map of Little St. Anne's Skete

Monastery information
- Order: Greek Orthodox

Site
- Location: Mount Athos; Greece
- Coordinates: 40°7′48″N 24°17′45″E
- Public access: Men only

Little St. Anne's Skete or the Minor Skete of St. Anne (Greek: Σκήτη μικρή Αγία Άννα, romanized: Skiti Mikri Agia Anna) is an Orthodox skete on Mount Athos, Greece.

== Cells ==
Some cells in the main area of the skete include:

- Anastasis Christou
- Apostomis Timiou Prodromou
- Kimiseos Theotokou

== Notable residents ==
Notable monks who lived at the skete include St. Joseph the Hesychast and his brotherhood, including disciples Arsenios the Cave Dweller, Ephraim of Arizona, and Joseph of Vatopedi. The hermitage of St. Joseph the Hesychast can be reached via a narrow footpath through a forest, which branches off from the main path connecting Little St. Anne's Skete with the Skete of Saint Anne.

Elder Gerasimos of Mikra Agia Anna is currently the hegumen of the skete.
