= Vatopedi =

Eastern Orthodox monastery, Mount Athos

The Sacred Patriarchal and Stavopegial Monastery of Vatopedi
- Ἡ Ἱερὰ Πατριαρχικὴ καὶ Σταυροπηγιακὴ Μονὴ Βατοπεδίου
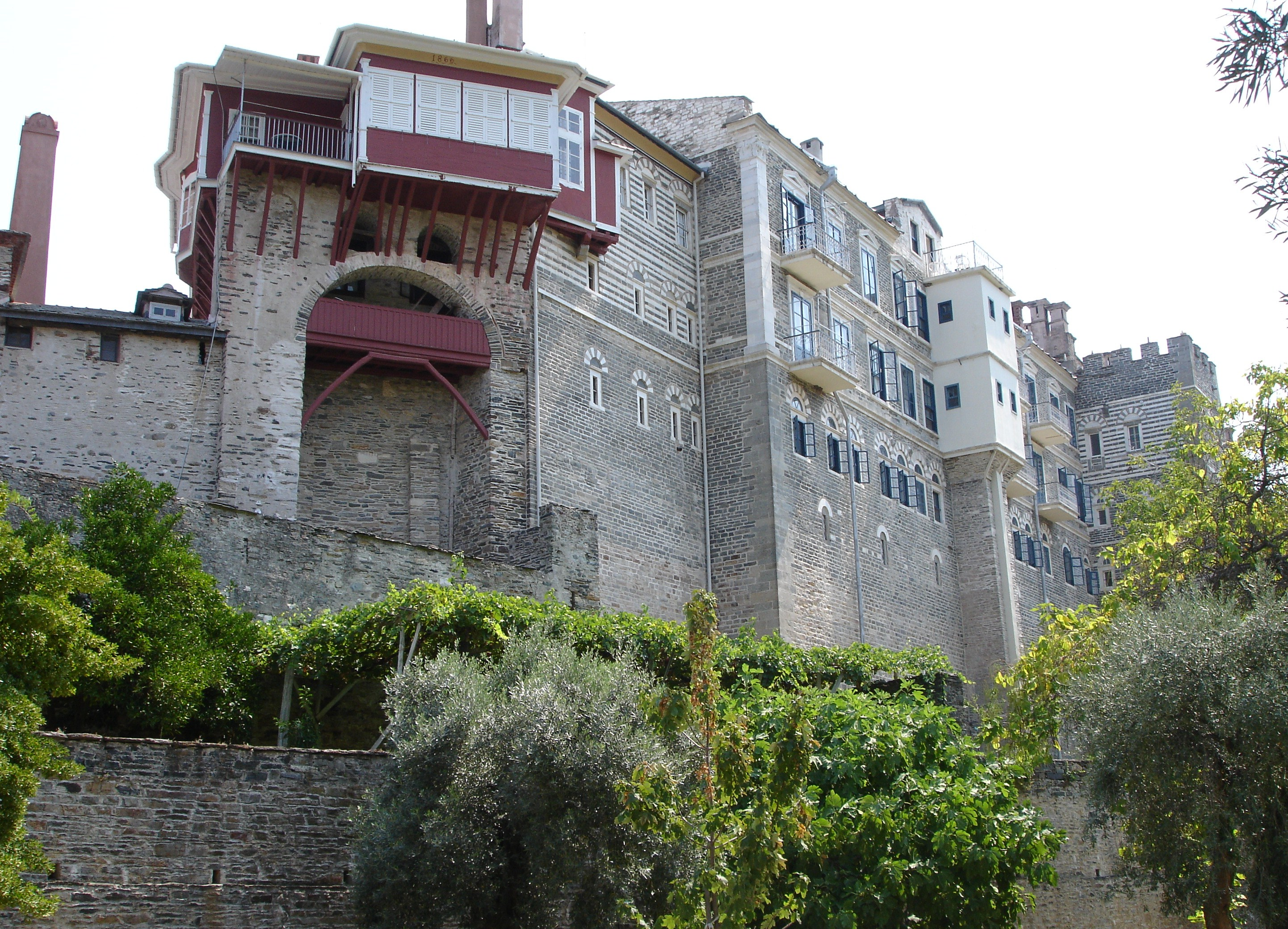
- External view of the monastery

- Location within Mount Athos

Monastery information
- Denomination: Eastern Orthodoxy
- Established: mid 10th century
- Dedication: Annunciation
- Archdiocese: Constantinople (Stavropegial)
- Controlled churches: Skete of Saint Andrew; Skete of Saint Demetrius

People
- Founders: Athanasius, Nicholas and Antonius (all from Adrianople)
- Abbot: Archimandrite Ephraim
- Archbishop: Ecumenical Patriarch Bartholomew of Constantinople
- Important associated figures: Elder Joseph (1921-2009); Gregorius, Metropolitan of Irinoupolis & Vatopedi; Elder Philippos; Elder Minas; Elder Neophytos; Elder Arkadius; Cosmas of Aetolia

Architecture
- Status: Open and functioning
- Heritage designation: UNESCO World Heritage Site
- Designated date: 1988

Site
- Location: Mount Athos
- Country: Greece
- Coordinates: 40.316667°N 24.216667°E
- Public access: Men only, with an access permit (διαμονητήριον)
- Other information: 7 miraculous icons of Virgin Mary: Elaiovrytissa, Ktetorissa (Vimatarissa), Esphagmeni, Pantanassa, Pyrovolitheisa, Antiphonitria and Paramythia
- Website: Vatopedi at the Mount Athos website

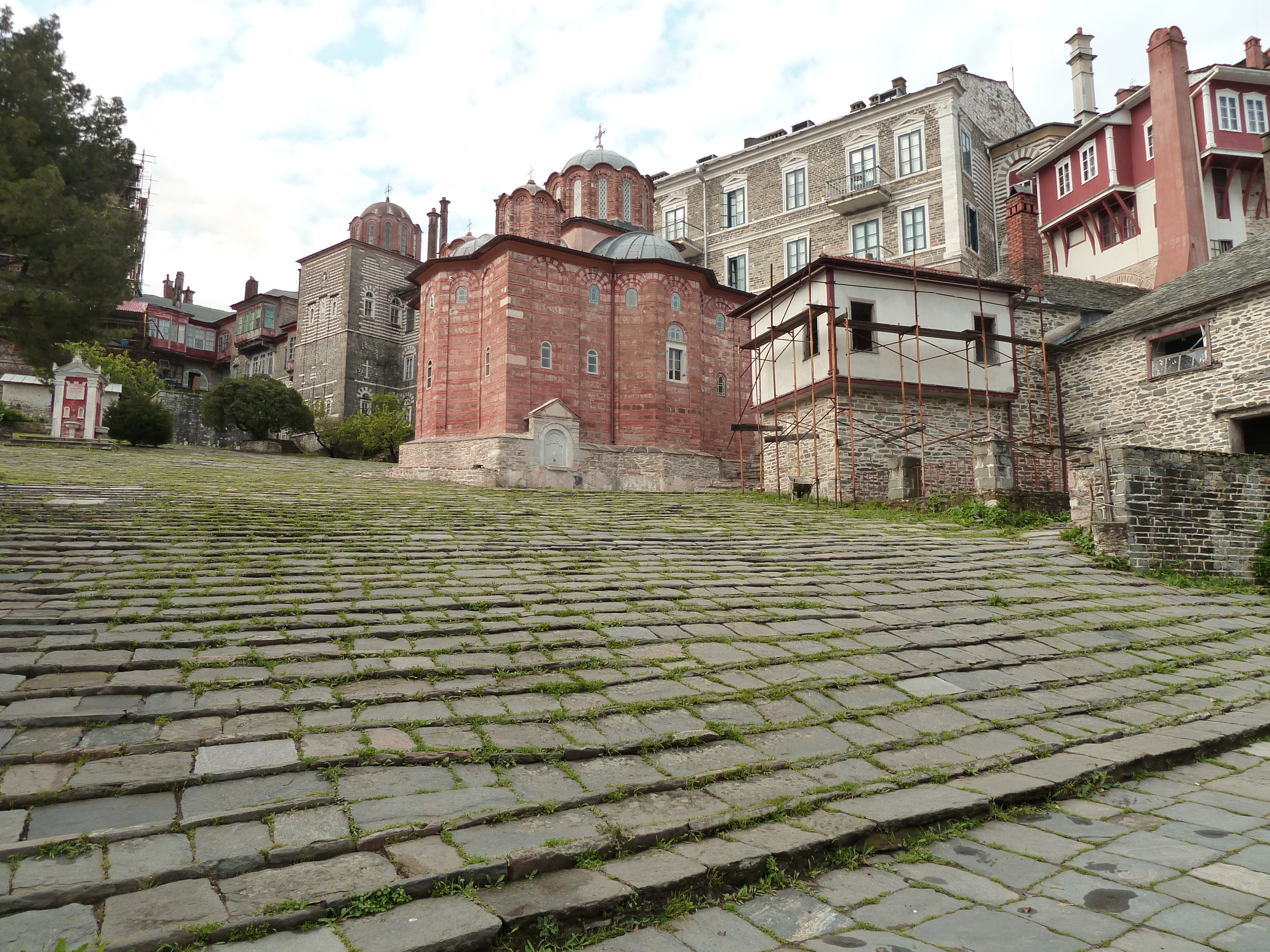
Interior

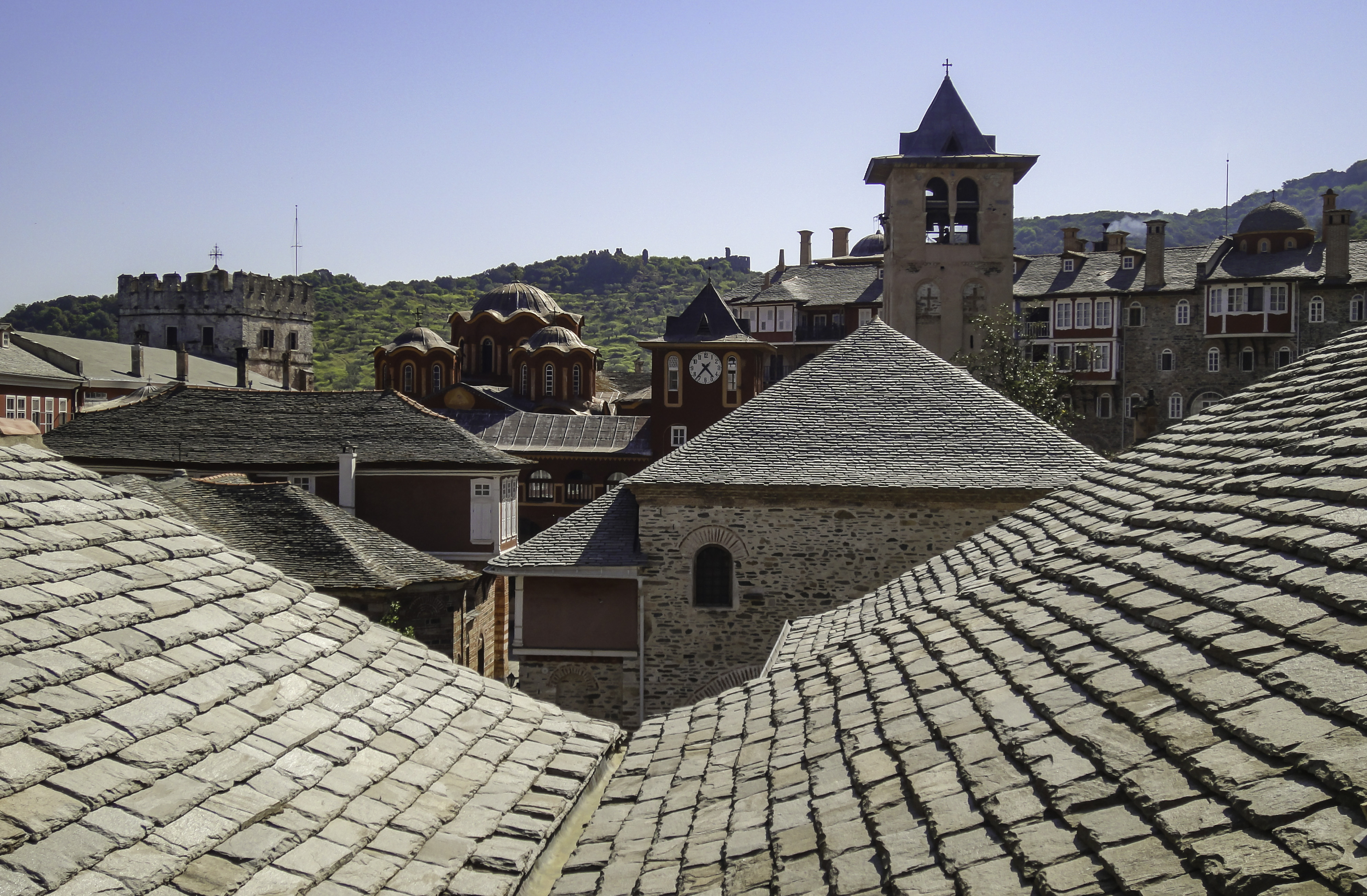
Overview

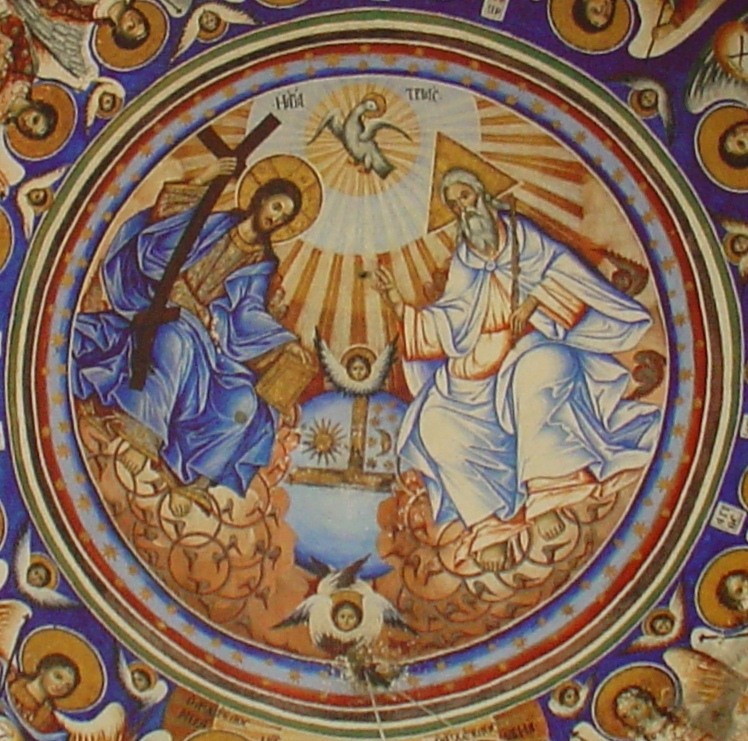
The Holy Trinity, fresco on the ceiling of the entrance (πρόστωον) of the katholikon at Vatopedi.

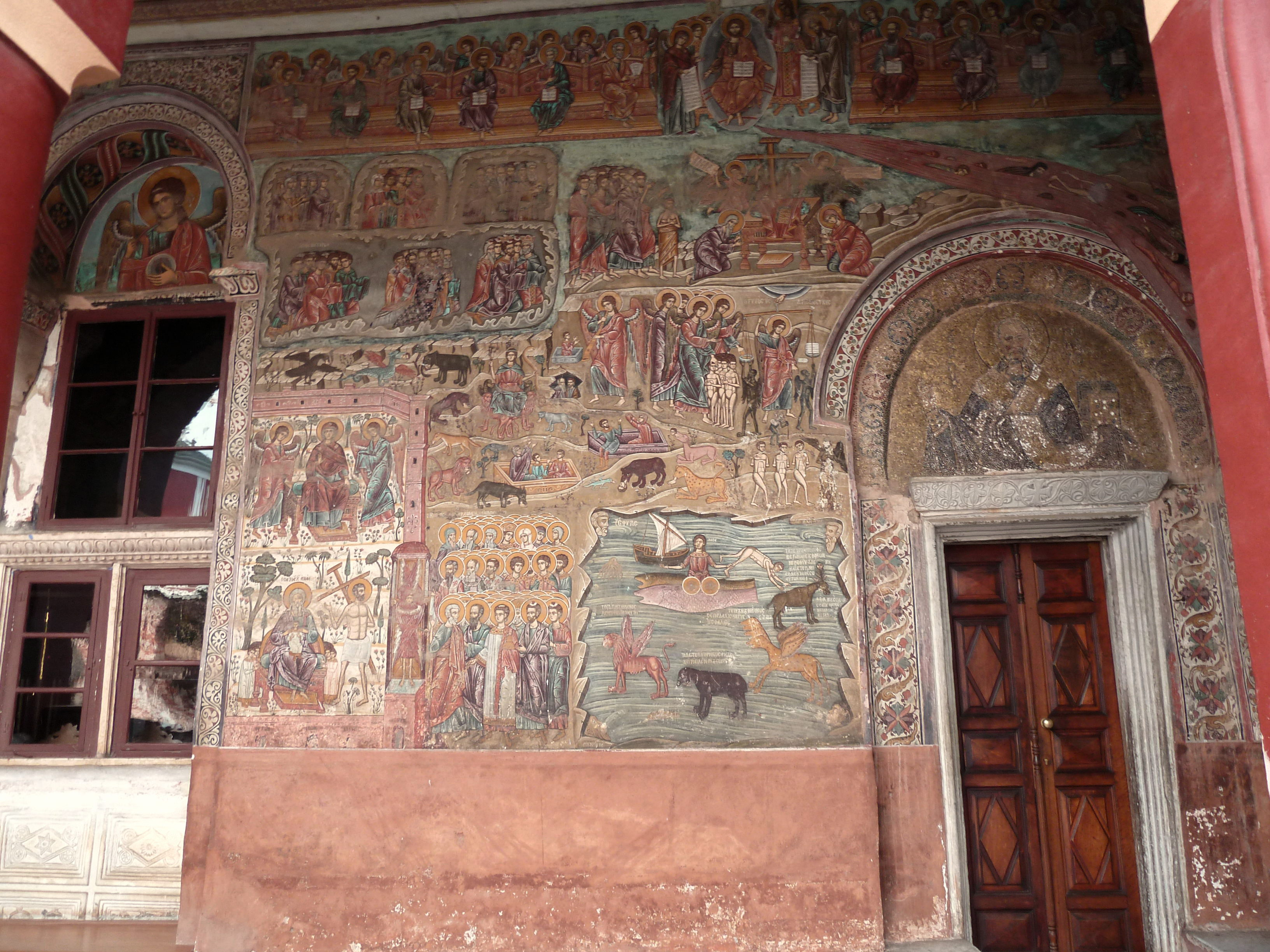
Frescoes

The Holy and Great Monastery of Vatopedi (Greek: Βατοπέδι, pronounced [vatoˈpeði]) is an Eastern Orthodox monastery on Mount Athos, Greece. The monastery was expanded several times during its history, particularly during the Byzantine period and in the 18th and 19th centuries. More than 120 monks live in the monastery.

== History ==
Vatopedi was built on the site of an early Christian settlement dating from Late Antiquity. In 2000, the Ephorate of Byzantine Antiquities excavated the foundations of an early Christian basilica to the north of the current katholikon of Vatopedi.

Vatopedi was founded in the second half of the 10th century by three Greek monks, Athanasios, Nicholaos, and Antonios, from Adrianople, who were disciples of Athanasius the Athonite. By the end of the 15th century, the Russian pilgrim Isaiah wrote that the monastery was Greek.

In 1990, Vatopedi was converted from an idiorrhythmic monastery into a cenobitic one.

== Ban of women visitors ==
Women are banned from visiting the monastery. The origin in the ban of women visitors was the abaton, a principle common in all convents banning visitors of the opposite sex; in the case of Athos, the complete ban of women expanded because the entire mountain came to be defined as a monastery, hence expanding the ban of women visitors.

== Sketes attached to Vatopedi ==
Two large sketes (monastic style communities) are attached to Vatopedi: the Skete of Saint Andrew in Karyes and the Skete of Saint Demetrius near the main monastery. Other kellia (κελλιά; small monasteries which are not independent) are also dependent on the monastery. Some of the kellia in the area of the main monastery compound include:

- Ag. Efthymiou
- Ag. Panton
- Ag. Grigorios Palamas
- Ag. Charalampos
- Ag. Christoforos
- Ag. Archangeli
- Ag. Evdokimos
- Xylourgio
- Ag. Onoufrios
- Palia Athoniada
- Pente Martyres
- Profiti Ilia

== Main buildings within the walls of the monastery ==
- The Katholikon (primary church), dedicated to the Annunciation of the Theotokos (Virgin Mary)
- The Refectory, or trapeza
- The Byzantine period clock tower
- The 10th century NE tower which now houses the monastery's library

Extensive construction projects are underway to restore the monastery's larger buildings.

== Treasures held within the monastery ==
The Monastery of Vatopedi holds the Cincture of the Theotokos, a belt held by some believers to be the actual belt of the Theotokos, which she wore on earth and gave to Thomas the Apostle after her death and during her transition to heaven (the equivalent in the Western Church is the Girdle of Thomas). The silver and jewel-encrusted reliquary containing the skull of St. John Chrysostom is kept in the Monastery and is credited by Eastern Orthodox Christians with miraculous healings. The monastery also contains the Iaspis, a chalice fashioned of a single piece of the precious stone jasper, and numerous icons.

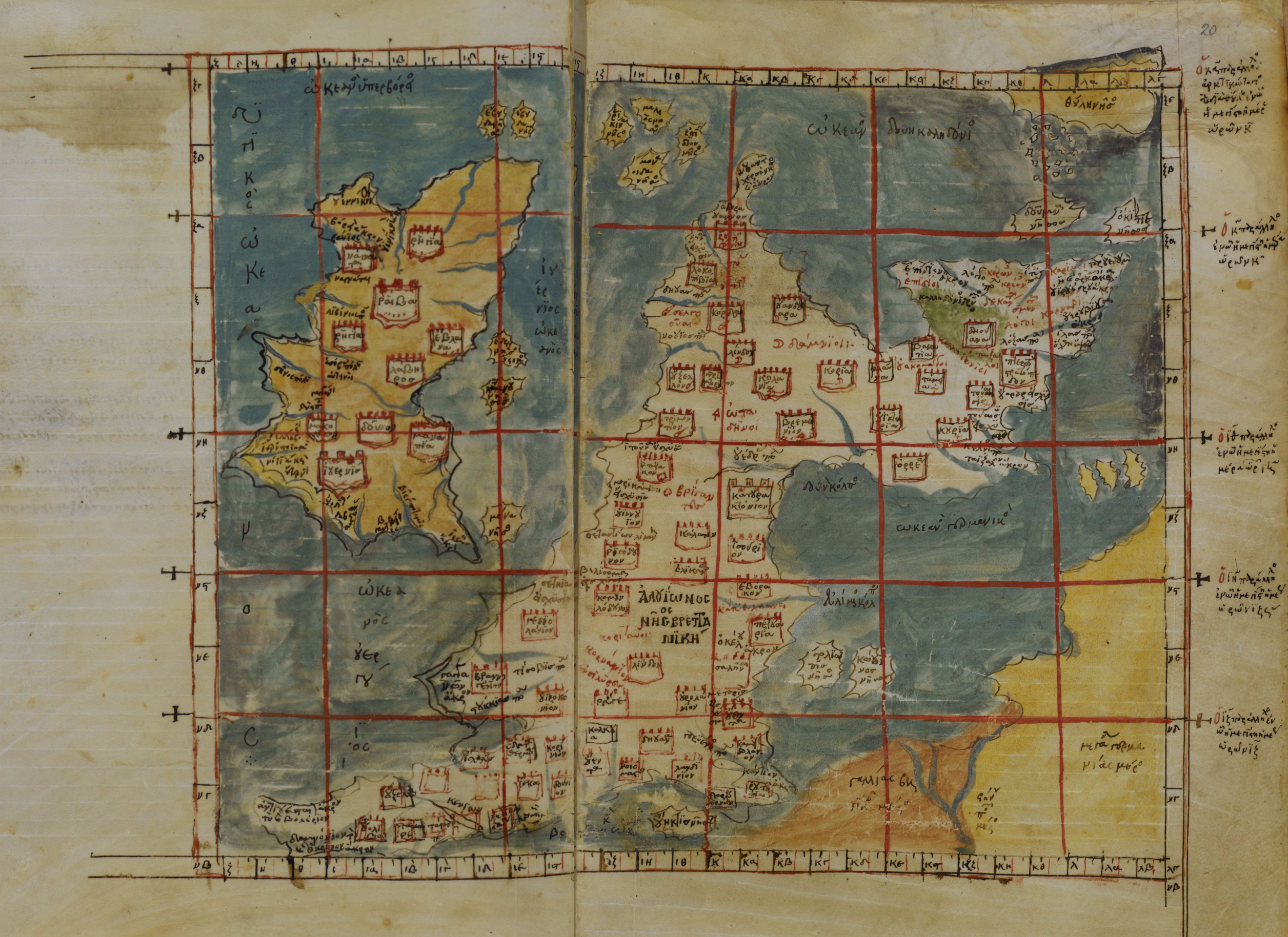
A 14th-century map of the British Isles from Vatopedinus 655, after Ptolemy.

Vatopedi's library preserves a medieval royal charter, the 13th-century Vatopedi Charter of Ivan Asen II of Bulgaria dedicated to the monastery. It was discovered in the monastery's archives in 1929.

The library holds 2,000 manuscripts and 35,000 printed books. Among manuscripts from Vatopedi are Uncial 063, Uncial 0102, and the Vatopedi Psalter in the British Library and the early-14th century Codex Vatopedinus 655 divided between the British Library and the French Bibliothèque Nationale, which includes numerous peripluses, extracts from Strabo and Ptolemy's geographical works, and early maps.

Other manuscripts

- Minuscules 245 & 464
- Lectionaries 54 & 55

== Land deal controversy ==
In September 2008, the monastery was implicated in an alleged real estate scandal (see also the Greek Wikipedia article). The monastery was accused of trading low-value land for high-value state property in a deal with the New Democracy government of Prime Minister Kostas Karamanlis. In the ensuing court case, all of the accused were ultimately acquitted and it was decided that there was no financial damage to the public treasury.

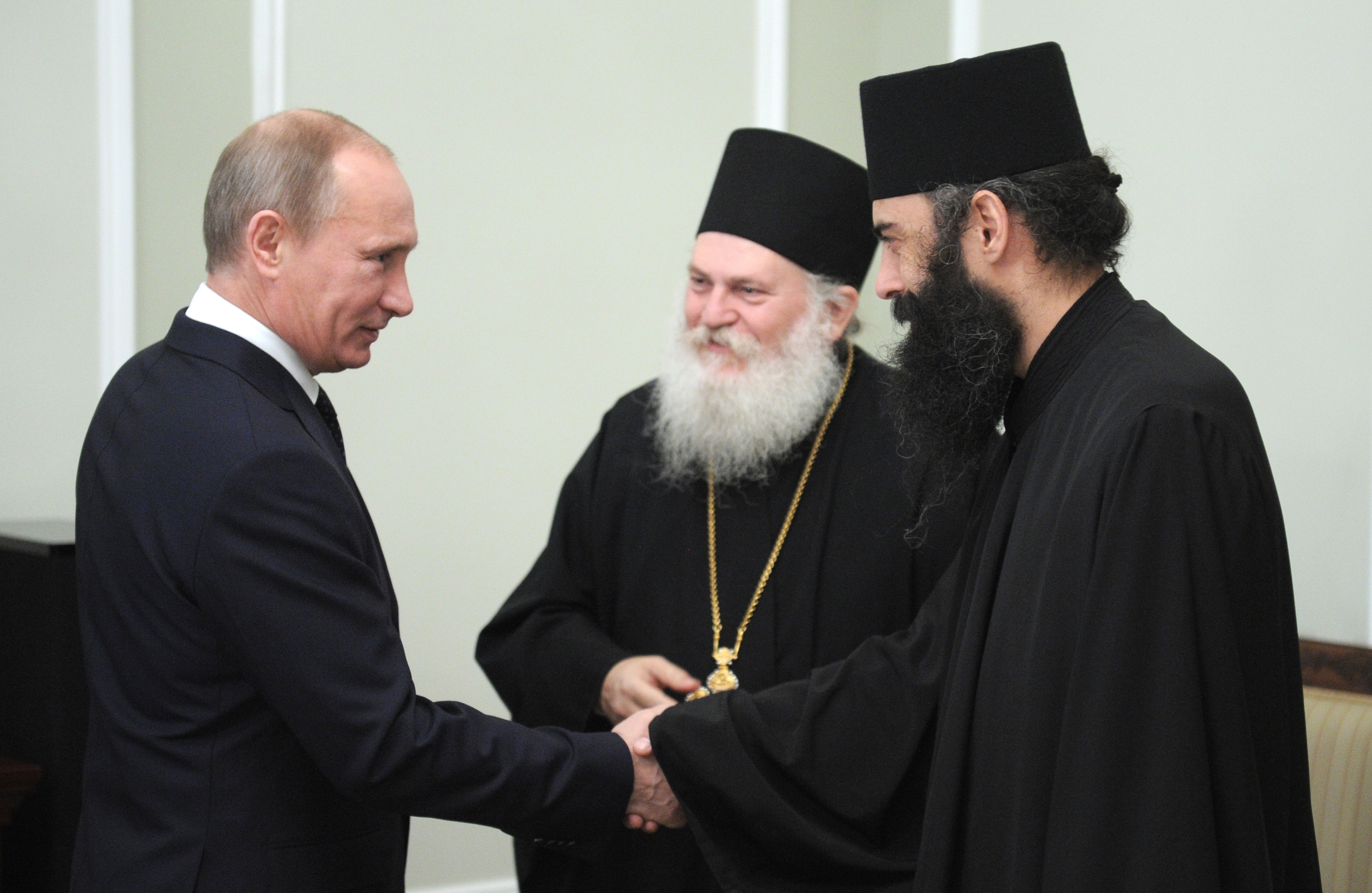
Current Prior of Vatopedi, Archimandrite Elder Efrem (Koutsou)

American writer Michael Lewis reports that a Greek parliamentary commission estimated the value of government property received by the monastery at one billion euros. Michael Lewis, in his book Boomerang: Travels in the New Third World, visits the monastery, details the frugal, hard-working lifestyle of the monks and investigates the real estate deal which would have helped in efforts to restore Vatopedi to its former glory.

After the story became public in August 2008, the government cancelled the land deals and two ministers resigned, under huge pressure from the media and public. Additionally, Parliament voted unanimously to set up a commission to investigate the deal. However, after investigations, the estimations of the public agencies for the exchanged real estate objects were found to have been in order.

In December 2010, a Court of Appeals found guilty and imposed a ten-month imprisonment (with three years suspension) to ex-judge Maria Psaltis on charges of misconduct and violations of judicial secrecy. The same penalty was issued to Abbot Ephraim and monk Arsenios on instigation. Finally Abbot Ephraim, monk Arsenios and the judge Maria Psaltis were relived from the accusation from Areios Pagos, the Supreme Court of the Hellenic Republic (Greece), by the act 966/2012.

As of December 2011, 3 years after the reveal of the alleged scandal, none of the two different investigating parliamentary commissions and various trials had found any of the persons involved guilty of illegal money transactions or real estate fraud. Then, in late December 2011, Abbot Ephraim was arrested, and jailed pending trial, for alleged fraud and embezzlement.

On January 11, 2012, the Criminal Division of the Supreme Court accepted the proposal of the Deputy Prosecutor of the Supreme Court Law Mr. Tsangas: it set aside the decision under which Psaltis, Ephraim, and Arsenios had each been sentenced to 10-month imprisonment (with three years suspended). The Supreme Court considered that the contested decision of the Court of Appeals had no legal justification and presented logical gaps, inconsistencies, and shortcomings. Moreover, the Supreme Court ruling that any disclosure of the outcome of the conference only a court is no longer a criminal offense [sic], which means that the three defendants will be treated under more favorable conditions when judged again by the court.

In October 2013, it was reported that fourteen persons, including Abbot Efrem and monk Arsenios were indicted on several counts including money laundering related to the Land Deal Controversy, which has been referred to as the "holy exchange".

On 23 March 2017, Efrem was fully acquitted.

== Miracle-working icons within the monastery ==
There are seven icons of the Mother of God in the monastery purported by believers to be miracle-working: Elaiovrytissa, Ktetorissa (Vimatarissa), Esphagmeni, Pantanassa, Pyrovolitheisa, Antiphonitria and Paramythia.

== See also ==
- Athonite Academy
- Ephraim of Vatopedi
- Joseph of Vatopedi

== Sources ==
- Fotić, Aleksandar. "Dispute Between Chilandar and Vatopedi over the Boundaries in Komitissa (1500)". Academia.
