= Ephraim of Katounakia =

20th-century Greek Orthodox monk

Saint Ephraim of Katounakia
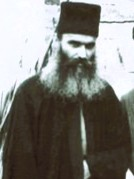
- Saint Ephraim of Katounakia, in the first years of his monastic life, on Mount Athos
- Born: Evangelos Papanikitas; 6 December 1912; Abelochori, Boeotia, Kingdom of Greece
- Residence: Mount Athos
- Died: 27 February 1998 (aged 85); Mount Athos, Greece
- Venerated in: Eastern Orthodox Church
- Canonized: 20 October 2019, Karyes, Mount Athos by Bartholomew I of Constantinople
- Feast: February 27
- Tradition or genre: Athonite Monasticism, Hesychasm

Saint Ephraim of Katounakia or Efrem/Ephraim Katounakiotis (Greek: Εφραίμ Κατουνακιώτης; born Evangelos Papanikitas (Ευάγγελος Παπανικήτας; 6 December 1912 – 27 February 1998) was a Greek Orthodox monk who lived on Mount Athos. He was canonized as a saint by the Ecumenical Patriarchate of Constantinople on 20 October 2019. His feast is commemorated on February 27.

== Early life ==
He was born into a peasant family on 6 December 1912 in Abelochori (Αμπελοχώρι), a village in Thebes, Boeotia. His father's name was Ioannis Papanikitas (Ιωάννης Παπανικήτας) and his mother's name was Victoria (Βικτωρία). He had had 3 siblings, namely Epaminondas (Ἐπαμεινώνδα), Eleni (Ἑλένη), and Charalambos (Χαράλαμπο). His secular name was Evangelos. He spent his childhood in Abelochori. However, while he was in primary school, his parents moved to Thebes for their children's education. He became interested in monasticism from an early age.

However, he suffered health problems as a child and developed lumps around his eyes at the age of 14. He also later developed a severe eczematous condition in the ankle joint.

== Monastic life ==
On September 14, 1933, Evangelos decided to become a monk and went to Katounakia at the southern tip of Mount Athos, also known as the "desert of Mount Athos". In Katounakia, he lived at the hermitage of Saint Ephrem the Syrian and was accompanied by his family acquaintances Ephraim and Nikephoros. Six months after his enlistment, he became a junior monk and received the name Longinus. In 1935, he was ordained a monk by his Elder Nikephoros and received the name Ephraim. The following year he was ordained a priest.

Father Ephraim met the famous Elder Joseph the Hesychast (1898–1959) and became his spiritual follower after receiving permission from Elder Nikephoros. Elder Joseph, in turn, exerted a catalytic influence on the young monk's spirituality.

In 1973, Hieromonk Nikephoros died. Ephraim formed a group of disciples after 1980, following Elder Joseph's instruction to have a group of disciples after the death of Nikephoros.

His nickname on Mount Athos was "the Charismatic Submissive" (Greek: ο χαρισματούχος υποτακτικός, romanized: O Charismatuchos Ypotaktikos) because of the obedience he showed to Elder Nikephoros, who was often very harsh.

In 1996, Ephraim suffered a stroke and was immobilized. He died on 27 February 1998 (Julian calendar date: 14 February 1998) and was buried on the land of his cell, in a grave he had dug himself with his own hands.

== Canonization ==
On 20 October 2019, at the Protaton Church in Karyes on Mt. Athos, Ecumenical Patriarch Bartholomew announced the canonization of four great 20th-century Athonite elders, including:

- Daniel of Katounakia (died 1929)
- Ieronymos of Simonopetra (died 1957)
- Joseph the Hesychast (died 1959)
- Ephraim of Katounakia (died 1998)
