= New Skete (Mount Athos) =

Orthodox Christian monastic settlements in Greece

- Νέα Σκήτη
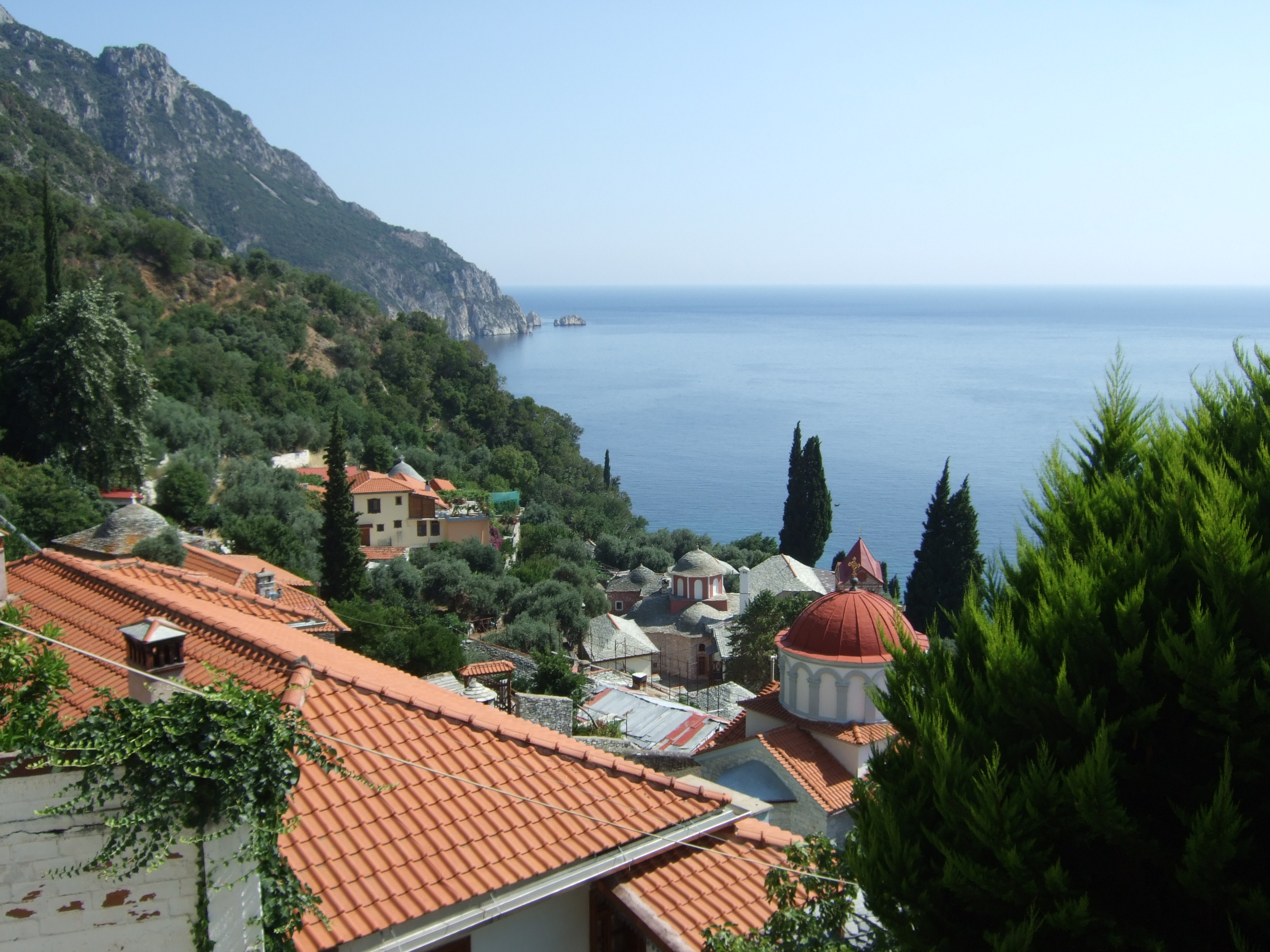
- View of the New Skete
- Interactive map of New Skete

Monastery information
- Full name: New Skete of the Holy Monastery of Agiou Pavlou
- Order: Greek Orthodox
- Dedication: Paul the Apostle

People
- Prior: Archimandrite Elder Parthenius (Mourelatos)

Site
- Location: Mount Athos; Greece
- Coordinates: 40.1611°N 24.2903°E
- Public access: Men only
- Website: https://www.neaskiti.gr

New Skete or Nea Skiti (Greek: Νέα Σκήτη or Σκήτη Εισοδίων της Θεοτόκου ή Νέα Σκήτη) is one of two Orthodox Christian sketes of Agiou Pavlou Monastery in the monastic state of Mount Athos. It lies on the Aegean sea shore between Agiou Pavlou Monastery (monastery of Saint Paul) and the Skete of Saint Anne, on the southwestern side of the peninsula of Athos (a 30-minute walk from Agiou Pavlou). It belongs administratively to the Skete of Saint Anne.

== Overview ==
The New Skete speaks Greek, follows the idiorrhythmic way of monastic life, and is inhabited by about 40 monastics living in about 33 residences. The Skete is built on the steep and rocky side of Mount Athos. The monastics support themselves by painting icons and cultivating olive trees and other small-scale agricultural products. Religious memorabilia, books, and other items are available for purchase on New Skete's website.

The Skete is in possession of some 200 ancient manuscripts in its library and 500 old printed books, in addition to many relics. It is possible that the Skete was built on the site of what used to be a city. These speculations are supported by many graves, coins and artifacts which have been found there.

Recently, concerns have started to arise over the longevity of the original Katholikon built in 1760 because of its precarious position next to a cliff overlooking the sea. Landslides caused by weather erosion have begun to threaten the foundation of the church and have led to concerns.

== History ==
Location of New Skete within Mount Athos.

The Skete was founded on 15 March 1753, at the request of some monks who already lived there, with the name of either Saint Benedict or Holy Cross. It was later slightly relocated and renamed. In some historical documents it is referred to as the Skete of Pyrgos. The central church, or Katholikon (Greek: καθολικόν) was built in 1760 and was dedicated to the Nativity of the Theotokos. A chapel was erected adjacent to the main church, dedicated to All Saints. The belltower dates back to the Komnenian Era.

=== Notable people ===
- In 1953, Saint Joseph the Hesychast moved with his brotherhood to New Skete and lived in a cell there until his repose in 1959. The original tomb of Saint Joseph (until his body was exhumed and relics were given to various monasteries) still exits in his chapel in New Skete. He was buried in the holy chapel of the Annunciation of the Virgin Mary. His tomb is a sacred place for many Orthodox Christians who have the ability to visit it.
- Fr. Seraphim the Anchorite was an anchorite under Fr. Neophytos of St. Demetrios' cell in New Skete.
- Elder Elpidios (twin brother of martyr Philoumenos of Jacob's Well) lived in New Skete and was considered to be a very holy elder.

== Map with key ==
Map key:

Number on map	Cell name (transliterated)	Cell name (Greek script)
1	tou Damaskinoú	του Δαμασκηνού
2	tou Daníl	του Δανιήλ
3	tou Thyní	του θυνί
4	Evangelismós	Ευαγγελισμός
5	tou Iosíf	του Ιωσήφ
6	Genésion Prodrómou	Γενέσιον Προδρόμου
7	Agios Sávvas	Αγ. Σάββας
8	Stávlos	Σταύλος
9	Pýrgos	Πύργος
10	Evangelismós	Ευαγγελισμός
11	Agios Nikólaos	Αγ. Νικόλαος
12	Agios Charálampos	Αγ. Χαράλαμπος
13	Genésion Prodrómou	Γενέσιον Προδρόμου
14	Agios Dimítrios	Αγ. Δημήτριος
15	Zoodóchou Pigís	Ζωοδόχου Πηγής
16	Agios Spyrídon	Αγ. Σπυρίδων
17	Isódia Theotókou	Εισόδια Θεοτόκου
18	Kímisis Theotókou	Κοίμησης Θεοτόκου
19	Agios Charálampos	Αγ. Χαράλαμπος (2)
20	Agios Andréas	Αγ. Ανδρέας (Αβραμαίοι)
21	Agios Anárgyri	Αγ. Ανάργυροι
22	Kímisis Theotókou	Κοίμησις Θεοτόκου
23	Apotomí tou Prodrómou	Αποτομής του Προδρόμου
24	Agios Anárgyri	Αγ. Ανάργυροι
25	tou Papaloú	του Παπαλού
26	Hypapantí	Υπαπαντή
27	Agiou Chrysóstomos	Αγ. Χρυσόστομος
28	Agios Spyrídon	Αγ. Σπυρίδων
29	Agios Ioánnis Theológos	Αγ. Ιωάννης θεολόγος
30	Agios Gregórios Palamás	Αγ. Γρηγόριος Παλαμάς
31	Kyriakón (church)	Κυριάκόν
32	Kimitírio (cemetery)	Κοιμητήριο
33	Agios Geórgios	Αγ. Γεώργιος
