= Bowdoin Prizes =

Awards given to Harvard University students

The Bowdoin Prizes are prestigious awards given annually to Harvard University undergraduate and graduate students. From the income of the bequest of Governor James Bowdoin, AB 1745, prizes are offered to students at the university in graduate and undergraduate categories for essays in the English language, in the natural sciences, in Greek and in Latin. Each winner of a Bowdoin Prize receives, in addition to $3,500, a medal, a certificate and their name printed in the commencement program.

== Notable recipients ==
The award was established in 1791, and past winners include (with year of award and professional highlights):

- Jared Sparks, 1815, historian and president of Harvard
- Ralph Waldo Emerson, 1820 and 1821, essayist and poet
- Charles Sumner, 1830 and 1832, politician and US Senator
- Jones Very, 1835 and 1836, Transcendentalist essayist and poet
- Richard Henry Dana Jr., 1837, lawyer and politician
- Edward Everett Hale, 1838 and 1839, author and historian
- Charles L. Flint, 1849, lawyer, horticulturalist, president of what is now University of Massachusetts Amherst
- Horatio Alger Jr., 1851, prolific author of "rags to riches" novels
- Henry Adams, 1858, historian and author
- James C. Fernald, 1860, preacher, author, and authority on the English language
- Richard Theodore Greener, 1870, statesman and dean of Howard University School of Law
- George Lyman Kittredge, 1881 and 1882, educator and scholar in English literature
- Alain LeRoy Locke, 1907, first African-American Rhodes Scholar, academic, writer, and "Father of the Harlem Renaissance"
- R. Nathaniel Dett, 1920, composer
- Henry Friendly, 1923, judge
- George Frazier, 1933, journalist
- Nathan Pusey, 1934, president of Harvard
- Daniel J. Boorstin, 1934, Rhodes Scholar, historian, and winner of the Pulitzer Prize
- Howard Nemerov, 1940, poet and winner of the Pulitzer Prize and National Book Award
- I. Bernard Cohen, 1941, historian of science
- Robert Galambos, 1941, neuroscientist
- Arthur Kinoy, 1941, attorney and civil rights leader
- Constantine Cavarnos, 1947, teacher, author, monk
- Henri Dorra, 1949, art historian
- Christopher Lasch, 1954, professor, author, historian, and social critic
- John Updike, 1954, writer
- Allen G. Debus, 1957 and 1958, historian of science
- Larry Siedentop, 1959, Marshall Scholar, political philosopher
- Edward Said, 1960, Palestinian essayist and academic
- James Samuel Gordon, 1961 and 1962, author, psychiatrist, and mind-body medicine expert
- Patrick T. Riley, 1966 and 1967, political science professor
- Robert Kirshner, 1970, astrophysicist
- Paul Starr, 1974, professor of sociology and public affairs
- Ralph Jay Hexter, 1974, professor of classics and comparative literature and provost of UC Davis
- James D. Weinrich, 1975, sex researcher and psychobiologist
- Robert W. Brooks, 1975, mathematician
- John Glover Roberts Jr., 1976, Chief Justice of the United States
- Paul Alan Cox, 1978 and 1981, ethnobotanist
- Richard H. Ebright, 1979, molecular and microbiologist
- Mark W. Moffett, 1986, entomologist
- Jonathan Veitch, 1988, historian and president of Occidental College
- Nicholas A. Christakis, 1988, physician and sociologist
- Cyrus Patell, 1991, literary and cultural critic
- Faith Salie, 1992, Rhodes Scholar, actress, and media personality
- William Pannapacker, 1995 and 1999, academic and journalist
- Mark Greif, 1997, Marshall Scholar, academic and literary critic
- Joe Roman, 2000, author and conservation biologist
- Vivek Ramaswamy, 2007, entrepreneur in the healthcare and technology sectors, political commentator, a New York Times bestselling author, and US presidential candidate

== See also ==
- Harvard University
