= Sending =

Act of conveying or directing something

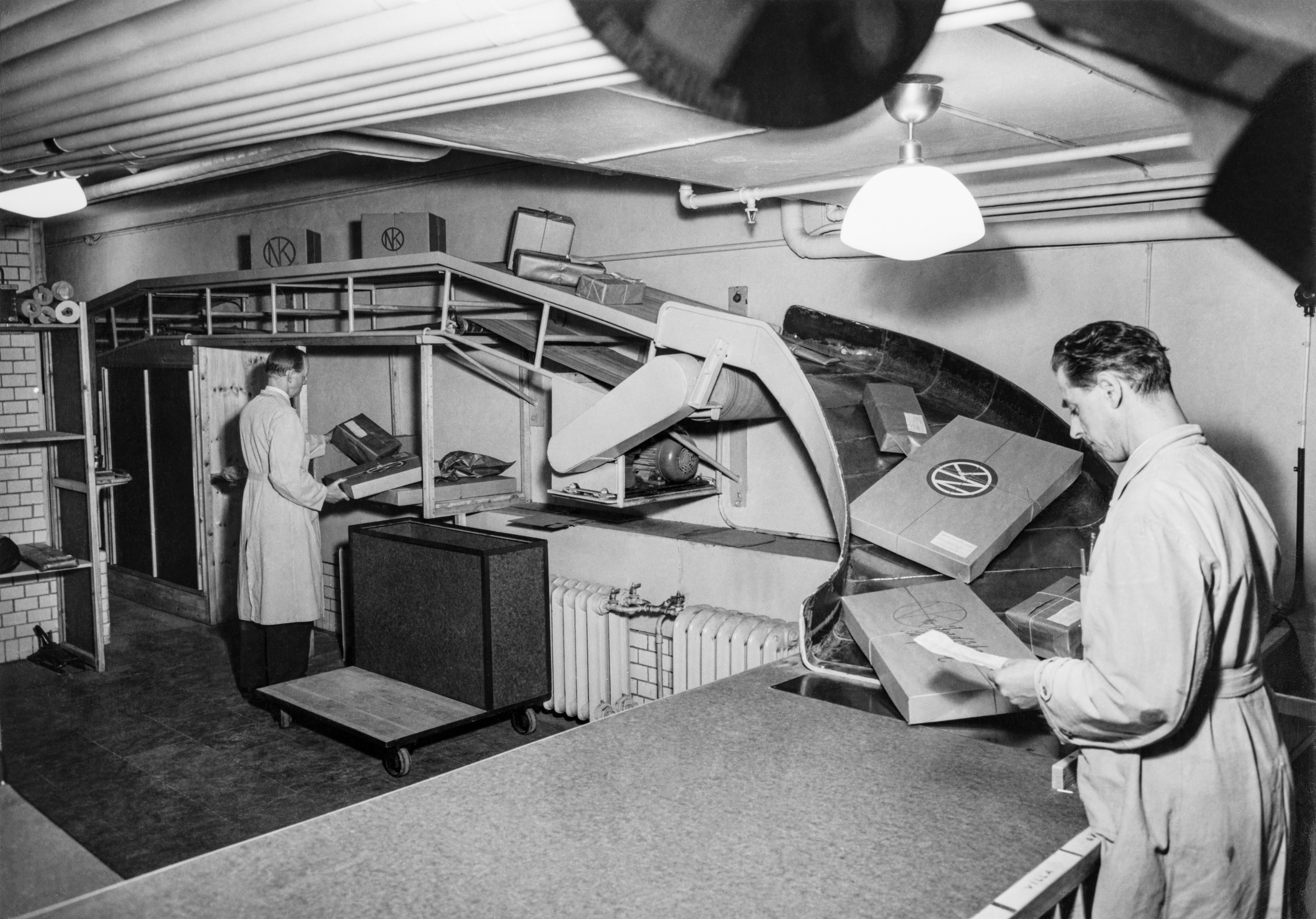
Workers at a department store in Stockholm in 1954, sorting packages for delivery to customers.

Sending, or to send, is the action of conveying or directing something or someone to another physical, virtual, or conceptual location for a specific purpose. The initiator of the action of sending is the sender. With respect to humans, "sending" also encompasses instructing others to go to another physical location, whether voluntarily or by force.

== Sending and volition ==
Sending is generally an act of volition, requiring the intent and purpose of the sender to cause a thing to be sent. English language authority James C. Fernald, in his 1896 English Synonyms and Antonyms, with Notes on the Correct Use of Prepositions, provided a lengthy examination of concepts falling within the rubric of sending:

To send is to cause to go or pass from one place to another, and always in fact or thought away from the agent or agency that controls the act. Send in its most common use involves personal agency without personal presence; according to the adage, "If you want your business done, go; if not, send"; one sends a letter or a bullet, a messenger or a message. In all the derived uses this same idea controls; if one sends a ball into his own heart, the action is away from the directing hand, and he is viewed as the passive recipient of his own act; it is with an approach to personification that we speak of the bow sending the arrow, or the gun the shot. To despatch is to send hastily or very promptly, ordinarily with a destination in view; to dismiss is to send away from oneself without reference to a destination; as, to dismiss a clerk, an application, or an annoying subject. To discharge is to send away so as to relieve a person or thing of a load; we discharge a gun or discharge the contents; as applied to persons, discharge is a harsher term than dismiss. To emit is to send forth from within, with no reference to a destination; as, the sun emits light and heat. Transmit, from the Latin, is a dignified term, often less vigorous than the Saxon send, but preferable at times in literary or scientific use; as, to transmit the crown, or the feud, from generation to generation; to transmit a charge of electricity. Transmit fixes the attention more on the intervening agency, as send does upon the points of departure and destination.

== Sending messages ==
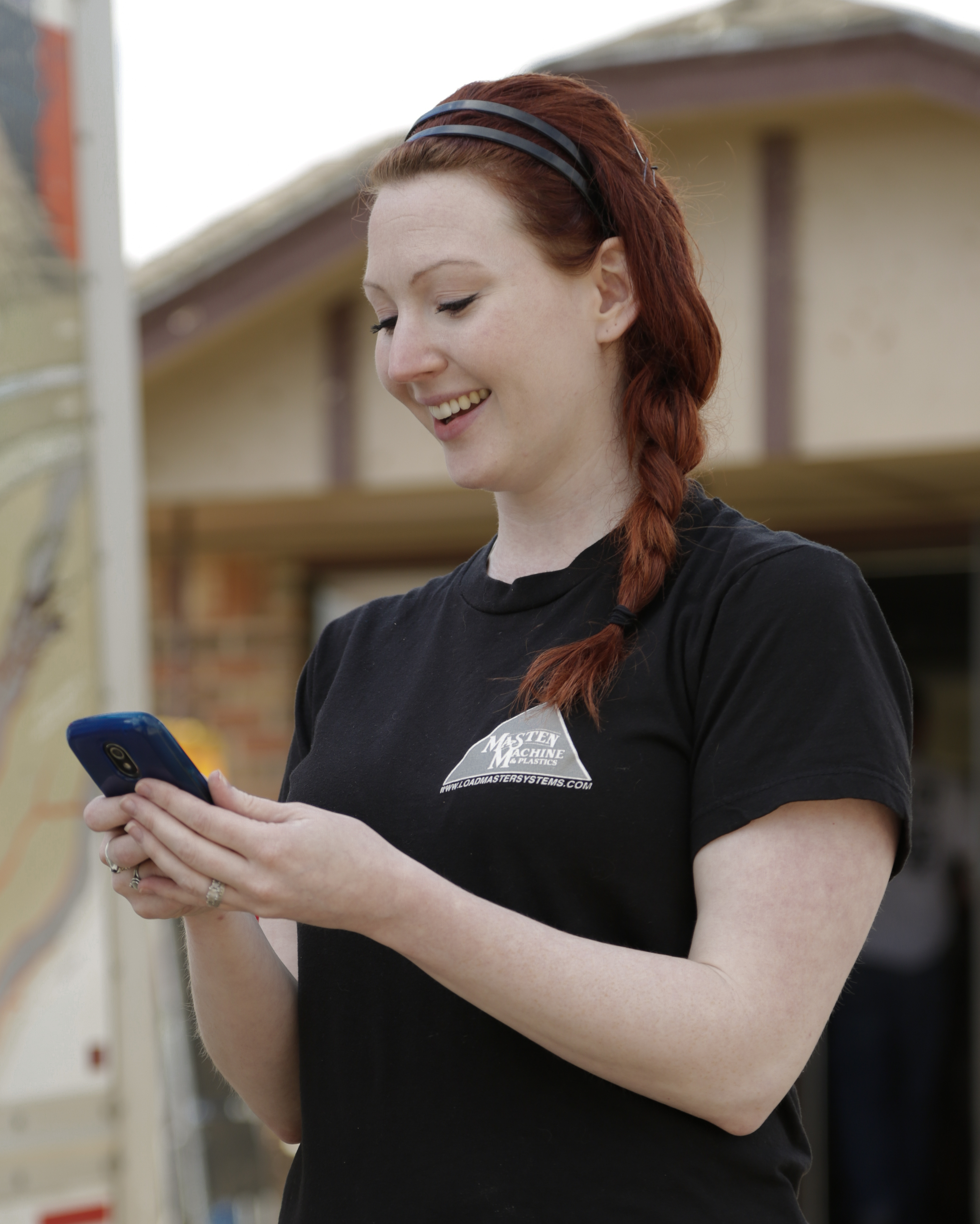
Woman in Oklahoma receiving a text message sent to her mobile device

A message may be sent by physical means of conveyance such as mail or by electronic means such as email and texting. The practice of communication by written documents carried by an intermediary from one person or place to another almost certainly dates back nearly to the invention of writing. However, the development of formal postal systems occurred much later. The first documented use of an organized courier service for the dissemination of written documents is in Egypt, where Pharaohs used couriers to send out decrees throughout the territory of the state (2400 BCE). The earliest surviving piece of mail is also Egyptian, dating to 255 BCE.

The phrase "send a message" or "sending a message" is also used with respect to actions taken by a party to convey that party's attitude towards a certain thing. For example, a government that executes people who commit acts of treason can be said to be "sending a message" that treason will not be tolerated. Conversely, a party that appears through its actions to endorse something that it actually opposes can be said to be "sending the wrong message", while one which appears to simultaneously endorse contradictory things can be said to be "sending mixed messages". The sending of mixed messages is a common source of miscommunication, particularly where the words of a message convey one thing, but accompanying nonverbal cues convey another. Mixed messages are also common in dating, where one member of a potential romantic couple may appear at different times receptive or dismissive of the pursuit of a relationship, for a variety of reasons including obliviousness to the likely interpretation of communications, internal uncertainty about pursuit of a relationship, or deliberate efforts to "appear cool and coy".

Communications are not necessarily things that are sent at all. An alternative to sending a communication somewhere is to create a sufficiently durable means of conveying the communication, such as carving or painting on a surface, or sculpting a three-dimensional representation, and placing it where persons arriving at that location will receive the communication. Some scientists have proposed the possibility of using quantum effects to convey messages without "sending" information at all, though this proposition depends on a semantic distinction between different meanings of the word, "sending".

== Sending items and objects ==
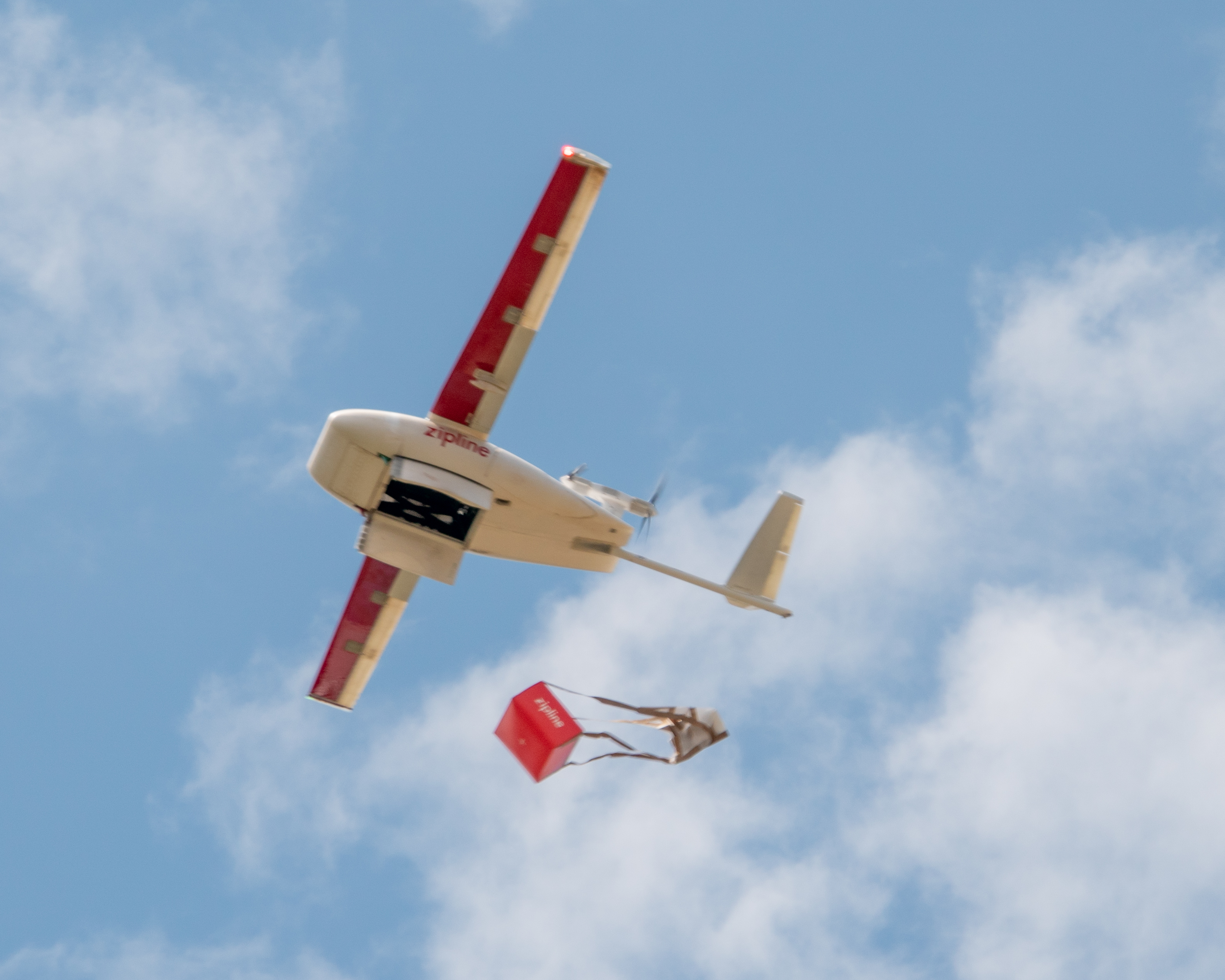
Sending a package by drone

Physical items or objects can similarly sent from one place to another for a wide variety of reasons, for the benefit of the sender, the recipient, or others. Things may be sent by a merchant in response to a remote purchase, or as a gift. International trade is primarily focused on the sending of goods from one place to another. Packaging, containerization and the like have developed to help facilitate the sending of cargo. Items as well as messages may be sent through the services of a courier or a post office. The sending of objects as gifts may involve multiple models of sending. For example, if a person orders a gift for another through a third-party website, from a social perspective the person making the order is sending the gift, while from the physical and economic perspective, it is the third-party website, or a vendor doing business with it, that is sending the item to the recipient.

Sending of small objects is done through package delivery or parcel delivery. The service is provided by most postal systems, express mail, private courier companies, and less than truckload shipping carriers. With respect to sending large items such as pieces of furniture, specialized less-than-truckload shipping carriers handle shipping furniture and other heavy goods from the manufacturer to a last mile hub. The last mile problem can also include the challenge of making deliveries in urban areas. Deliveries to retail stores, restaurants, and other merchants in a central business district often contribute to congestion and safety problems.

== Sending people ==
A person or group of people can be sent to places for various reasons, and the fact of one person sending another person somewhere often indicates that the person sent was not sent of their own volition. For example, persons who engage in disfavored conduct may be sent to prison or detention, expelled from a school, banished from a place, or sent to a remote or inhospitable place. An unruly or unwanted child may be sent to a boarding school, or to live with a different family. Conversely, people may volunteer or even campaign to be sent places in order to explore, or achieve some personal benefit or public good. In some cases a person might be sent away to protect them from danger, without a specific destination being determined in advance.

The sending of military personnel to positions from which they can prepare for or engage in combat is called deployment. The word "deploy" can be used in multiple senses within this framework, so that "it could mean, on the one hand, the sending of troops forward from their peacetime bases. The Navy, for example, calls extended cruises 'deployments' even when no combat operations are anticipated. In another sense, it might be countered that 'deploying the troops' means sending them onto the field of battle from their forward staging bases".

Many religions incorporate beliefs in a supreme being "sending" things in a variety of ways, including sending messengers or prophets, and sending people (or components of people, such as souls) to specific afterlives. In some religions this raises the question of why a benevolent god would send souls to afterlives of eternal torment, which is resolved by claiming that the condemned souls have actually chosen to send themselves to that afterlife.
