= Constantine Cavarnos =

American philosopher, Byzantinist, and monk

Schemamonk Constantine Cavarnos
- Born: October 19, 1918; Boston, Massachusetts, U.S.
- Died: March 3, 2011 (aged 92); Florence, Arizona, U.S.
- Occupations: Professor and monk
- Known for: Institute for Byzantine and Modern Greek Studies

Academic background
- Education: Harvard University (AB, PhD)
- Thesis: The classical theory of relations; a historical and critical study in the metaphysics of Plato, Aristotle, and Thomism (1948)

Academic work
- Institutions: Tufts University; University of North Carolina; Wheaton College; Institute for Byzantine and Modern Greek Studies
- Main interests: Christianity, Byzantine studies, history, theology, and philosophy
- Website: Institute for Byzantine and Modern Greek Studies

Schemamonk Constantine Cavarnos (1918, Boston – March 3, 2011, Florence, Arizona) was an American philosopher, Byzantinist, and Eastern Orthodox monk.

== Early life and education ==
Cavarnos was born in Boston on October 19, 1918. Cavarnos attended the English High School in Boston.

In 1941, Cavarnos graduated from Harvard with an Bachelor of Arts, received magna cum laude. That same year, he won the Francis Bowen Prize for writing an essay about Plato and the individual life. In 1945, he again won the Francis Bowen Prize for an essay he wrote on Plato. In 1947, he won a Bowdoin Prize for a thesis on Henri Bergson. He graduated from Harvard University in 1948 with a doctorate in philosophy. His PhD thesis focused on the metaphysics of Plato, Aristotle, and Thomism.

== Career ==
Cavarnos taught philosophy at Tufts University, the University of North Carolina, and Wheaton College. In 1956, he founded and became director of the Institute for Byzantine and Modern Greek Studies (IBMGS) in Belmont, Massachusetts. In 1978, he joined Hellenic College Holy Cross Greek Orthodox School of Theology in Brookline, Massachusetts, as a professor of philosophy, later becoming professor of Byzantine art. He also lectured at various Orthodox seminaries.

In the last three years of his life, Cavarnos became a monk at St. Anthony's Greek Orthodox Monastery in Florence, Arizona. He died there on March 3, 2011.

== Publications ==
Cavarnos wrote almost 100 books and various papers on philosophy, theology, history, among other topics.

His 15-volume Modern Orthodox Saints series consists of the following titles.

1. St. Cosmas Aitolos. (ISBN 0-914744-65-8)
2. St. Macarios of Corinth. (ISBN 0-914744-35-6)
3. St. Nicodemos the Hagiorite. (ISBN 0-914744-18-6)
4. St. Nikephoros of Chios. (ISBN 0-914744-74-7)
5. St. Seraphim of Sarov. (ISBN 0-914744-48-8)
6. St. Arsenios of Paros. (ISBN 0-914744-80-1)
7. St. Nectarios of Aegina. (ISBN 0-914744-78-X)
8. St. Savvas the New. (ISBN 0-914744-63-1)
9. St. Methodia of Kimolos. (ISBN 0-914744-76-3)
10. Saints Raphael, Nicholas and Irene of Lesvos. (ISBN 0-914744-88-7)
11. Blessed Elder Philotheos Zervakos. (ISBN 0-914744-94-1)
12. Blessed Hermit Philaretos of the Holy Mountain. (ISBN 1-884729-21-5)
13. Blessed Elder Gabriel Dionysiatis. (ISBN 1-884729-48-7)
14. Blessed Elder Iakovos of Epiros, Elder Joseph the Hesychast, and Mother Stavritsa the Missionary. (ISBN 1-884729-53-3)
15. St. Athanasios Parios. (ISBN 1-884729-78-9)

His various books include the following, organized by topic.

Art, music, and iconography:

- Cavarnos, Constantine (1974). Byzantine thought and art: a collection of essays. Belmont, Mass.: Institute for Byzantine and Modern Greek Studies. ISBN 0-914744-22-4. OCLC 4079066.
- Kontoglou, Phōtēs; Cavarnos, Constantine (1985). Byzantine sacred art: selected writings of the contemporary Greek icon painter Fotis Kontoglous on the sacred arts according to the tradition of Eastern Orthodox Christianity. Belmont, Mass., U.S.A.: Institute for Byzantine and Modern Greek Studies. ISBN 0-914744-60-7. OCLC 12077741.
- Cavarnos, Constantine (1977). Orthodox iconography: four essays dealing with the history of Orthodox iconography, the iconographic decoration of churches, the functions of the icons, and the theology and aesthetics of Byzantine iconography: in addition, three appendixes containing authoritative early Christian texts on icons, explanations of the techniques of iconography, and a discussion of two Russian books on icons. Belmont, Mass.: Institute for Byzantine and Modern Greek Studies. ISBN 0-914744-36-4. OCLC 3447104.
- Cavarnos, Constantine (1988). The Icon: Its Spiritual Basis and Purpose. Belmont, Mass.: Institute for Byzantine and Modern Greek Studies. ISBN 0-914744-19-4. OCLC 948503711.
- Cavarnos, Constantine (1996). Spiritual beauty: a discussion, in English and Greek, of the concept of spiritual beauty by reference to philosophic, religious, and literary writings that date from antiquity to the present = To pneumatikon kallos. Belmont, Mass.: Institute for Byzantine and Modern Greek Studies. ISBN 1-884729-13-4. OCLC 35208039.
- Cavarnos, Constantine (2001). Aristotle's theory of the fine arts: with special reference to their value in education and therapy. Belmont, Mass.: Institute for Byzantine and Modern Greek Studies. ISBN 1-884729-63-0. OCLC 48991791.
- Cavarnos, Constantine (1998). Fine arts as therapy: Plato's teaching organized and discussed. Belmont, Mass.: Institute for Byzantine and Modern Greek Studies. ISBN 1-884729-32-0. OCLC 42048672.
- Cavarnos, Constantine (1994). Pythagoras on the fine arts as therapy: a lecture delivered in 1993 at Wellesley College. Belmont, Mass.: Institute for Byzantine and Modern Greek Studies. ISBN 1-884729-00-2. OCLC 32124642.
- Cavarnos, Constantine; Αχταρίδη, Σοφία (1995). Byzantine churches of Thessaloniki: an illustrated account of the architecture and iconographic decoraton of seven Byzantine churches of Thessaloniki, together with important historical data. Belmont, Mass.: Institute for Byzantine and Modern Greek Studies. ISBN 1-884729-08-8. OCLC 34960800.
- Cavarnos, Constantine (2007). Byzantine church architecture. Belmont, Mass.: Institute for Byzantine and Modern Greek Studies. ISBN 978-1-884729-84-3. OCLC 191879109.
- Cavarnos, Constantine; Kontoglou, Phōtēs (1992). Meetings with Kontoglou: enlightening, lively discussions on Byzantine iconography and music, diverse writers, philosophers and theologians, and contemporary events and trends, between the author and the great icon painter, writer, and philosopher Photios Kontoglou. Belmont, Mass.: Institute for Byzantine and Modern Greek Studies. ISBN 0-914744-95-X. OCLC 28539589.
- Kontoglou, Phōtēs; Cavarnos, Constantine (2004). Fine arts and tradition: four essays by the renowned Greek icon painter, writer, and philosopher Photios Kontoglou (1895-1965). Belmont, Mass.: Institute for Byzantine and Modern Greek Studies. ISBN 1-884729-76-2. OCLC 60375529.

Ancient philosophy:

- Cavarnos, Constantine (1989). The Hellenic-Christian philosophical tradition: four lectures delivered at Boston University ... Belmont, Mass.: Institute for Byzantine and Modern Greek Studies. ISBN 0-914744-83-6. OCLC 21040368.
- Cavarnos, Constantine (1988). A dialogue between Bergson, Aristotle, and Philologos: a comparative and critical study of some aspects of Henri Bergson's theory of knowledge and of reality. Belmont, Mass., U.S.A.: Institute for Byzantine and Modern Greek Studies. ISBN 0-914744-79-8. OCLC 19323897.
- Cavarnos, Constantine (1975). The classical theory of relations: a study in the metaphysics of Plato, Aristotle, and Thomism. Belmont, Mass.: Institute for Byzantine and Modern Greek Studies. ISBN 0-914744-28-3. OCLC 1818711.
- Cavarnos, Constantine; Moore, G. E. (1979). A dialogue on G. E. Moore's ethical philosophy, together with an account of three talks with G. E. Moore on diverse philosophical questions. Belmont, Mass.: Institute for Byzantine and Modern Greek Studies. ISBN 0-914744-43-7. OCLC 5939796.
- Cavarnos, Constantine (2004). Greek letters and Orthodoxy: significant relations of Orthodox Christianity to the Greek language and to ancient Greek philosophy, rhetoric, and poetry. Belmont, Mass.: Institute for Byzantine and Modern Greek Studies. ISBN 1-884729-75-4. OCLC 57415939.
- Cavarnos, Constantine (2001). Plutarch's advice on keeping well: a lecture delivered at the International Congress of Psychopathology of Expression and Art Therapy which met in September 2000 at McLean Hospital in Belmont, Massachusetts, together with an anthology of relevant texts from Plutarch's works. Belmont, Mass: Inst. for Byzantine and Modern Greek Studies. ISBN 1-884729-60-6. OCLC 834132186.
- Cavarnos, Constantine (1996). The seven sages of ancient Greece: the lives and teachings of the earliest Greek philosophers, Thales, Pittacos, Bias, Solon, Cleobulos, Myson, Chilon. Belmont, Mass.: Institute for Byzantine and Modern Greek Studies. ISBN 1-884729-16-9. OCLC 35643940.
- Cavarnos, Constantine (1975). Plato's view of man: two Bowen Prize essays dealing with the problem of the destiny of man and the individual life, together with selected passages from Plato's Dialogues on man and the human soul. Belmont, Massachusetts. ISBN 0-914744-26-7. OCLC 1529037.
- Cavarnos, Constantine (1998). Dostoievsky's philosophy of man: a general discussion of Dostoievsky's view of man's nature and destiny, together with pertinent discussion-reviews of six of his works. Belmont, Mass.: Institute for Byzantine and Modern Greek Studies. ISBN 1-884729-44-4. OCLC 42047894.
- Cavarnos, Constantine (2003). Orthodoxy and philosophy: lectures delivered at St. Tikhon's Orthodox Theological Seminary: an illuminating discussion of Orthodox Christianity with reference to ancient Greek and modern Western philosophy. Belmont, Mass.: Institute for Byzantine and Modern Greek Studies. ISBN 1-884729-71-1. OCLC 54400352.

Modern Greek studies:

- Cavarnos, Constantine (1986). Modern Greek thought: three essays dealing with philosophy, critique of science, and views of man's nature and destiny. Belmont, Mass.: Institute for Byzantine and Modern Greek Studies. ISBN 0-914744-11-9. OCLC 38887038.
- Cavarnos, Constantine (1987). Modern Greek philosophers on the human soul: selections from the writings of seven representative thinkers of modern Greece: Benjamin of Lesvos, Vrailas-Armenis, Skaltsounis, St. Nectarios, Louvaris, Kontoglou, and Theodorakopoulos: on the nature and immortality of the soul, translated from the original Greek and edited with a preface, introduction, notes, and glossary. Belmont, Mass.: Institute For Byzantine and Modern Greek Studies. ISBN 0-914744-77-1. OCLC 15721856.
- Cavarnos, Constantine; Tovar, Saúl A. (1995). Cultural and educational continuity of Greece: from antiquity to the present. Belmont, Mass.: Institute for Byzantine and Modern Greek Studies. ISBN 1-884729-03-7. OCLC 32545827.
- Cavarnos, Constantine (1999). The Hellenic heritage: two lectures dealing with Greek culture: ancient, Byzantine, and modern. Belmont, Mass., U.S.A.: Institute for Byzantine and Modern Greek studies. ISBN 1-884729-50-9. OCLC 43596079.
- Cavarnos, Constantine (2006). Philosophical dictionary: English-Greek and Greek-English: a new instrument for scholars in the fields of philosophy, the classics, modern Greek studies, the sciences, theology, and the humanities in general. Belmont, Mass.: Institute for Byzantine and Modern Greek Studies. ISBN 1-884729-81-9. OCLC 228117564.
- Cavarnos, Constantine (1994). Orthodox Christian terminology: a discussion of the subject of developing a satisfactory, acceptable, standardized English-language terminology in Eastern Orthodox theology, hagiology, Church services, and the sacred arts, together with Greek-English and English-Greek glossaries. Belmont, Mass., U.S.A.: Institute for Byzantine and Modern Greek Studies. ISBN 0-914744-98-4. OCLC 32018720.

Lives of saints:

- Cavarnos, Constantine (2010). Saint John Damascene: a concise account of his life and works as a theologian and hymnographer, together with and analysis of his superb Paschal (Easter) canon, which is presented both in the original Greek and in precise English translation. Belmont, Mass.: Institute for Byzantine and Modern Greek Studies. ISBN 978-1-884729-93-5. OCLC 708740508.
- Cavarnos, Constantine (2008). Saint Mark of Ephesos: renowned Greek theologian of the late Byzantine period and eminent philosopher and church hymnographer: his life, character, thought, writings, and influence. Belmont, Mass.: Institute for Byzantine and Modern Greek Studies. ISBN 978-1-884729-87-4. OCLC 320799675.
- Cavarnos, Constantine (1998). St. Photios the Great: philosopher and theologian. Belmont, Mass.: Institute for Byzantine and Modern Greek Studies. ISBN 1-884729-42-8. OCLC 42047900.

Monasticism:

- Cavarnos, Constantine (1975). Anchored in God: an inside account of life, art, and thought on the Holy Mountain of Athos. Belmont, Mass.: Institute for Byzantine and Modern Greek Studies. ISBN 0-914744-30-5. OCLC 2072456.
- Cavarnos, Constantine (1973). The Holy Mountain; two lectures on Mount Athos, of which the first deals with its scholars, missionaries, and saints, and the second with its music, musicians, and hymnographers, together with an account of a recent visit to Athos. Belmont, Mass.: Institute for Byzantine and Modern Greek Studies. ISBN 0-914744-38-0. OCLC 821103.

Collected works:

- Cavarnos, Constantine; Cavarnos, John P. (1989). New library. Belmont, Mass.: Institute for Byzantine and Modern Greek Studies. ISBN 0-914744-82-8. OCLC 21038260. (2009 reprint)

Theology and spirituality:

- Cavarnos, Constantine (1993). Immortality of the soul: the testimony of the Old and New Testaments, Orthodox iconography and hymnography, and the works of Eastern fathers and other writers of the Orthodox Church. Belmont, Mass.: Institute for Byzantine and Modern Greek Studies. ISBN 0-914744-96-8. OCLC 29021851.
- Cavarnos, Constantine (2001). Holiness: man's supreme destiny: four orthodox homilies in which are discussed the concept of holiness, hunger for holiness, and striving for holiness. Belmont, Mass.: Institute for Byzantine and Modern Greek Studies. ISBN 1-884729-64-9. OCLC 48991275.
- Cavarnos, Constantine (1996). The concept of Christian love: a lecture delivered at Columbia University, together with a Swedish version of it. Belmont, Mass.: Institute for Byzantine and Modern Greek Studies. ISBN 1-884729-09-6. OCLC 35172373.
- Cavarnos, Constantine (2002). The Rational Man According to St. Anthony the Great. Belmont, Mass.: Institute for Byzantine and Modern Greek Studies.
- Cavarnos, Constantine (1997). Victories of orthodoxy: homilies in which are discussed in a forthright and analytical manner iconoclasm, Orthodox mysticism, the false union of Florence, the calendar change, traditional iconography, sacred music, and ecumenism, and the stand of the Orthodox Christian Church regarding these. Belmont, Mass.: Institute for Byzantine and Modern Greek Studies. ISBN 1-884729-30-4. OCLC 40330168.
- Cavarnos, Constantine (1996). Ecumenism examined: a concise analytical discussion of the contemporary ecumenical movement. Belmont, Mass.: Institute for Byzantine and Modern Greek Studies. ISBN 1-884729-18-5. OCLC 37277298.
- Cavarnos, Constantine (2006). Man's spiritual evolution. Belmont, Mass.: Institute for Byzantine and Modern Greek Studies. ISBN 1-884729-83-5. OCLC 244004315.
- Cavarnos, Constantine (2002). The priest as spiritual father: an Orthodox Christian homily, together with gems from St. John Damascene on the spiritual life, counsels of St. Gregory Palamas, and a discussion of the Ladder of Divine Ascent. Belmont, Mass.: Institute for Byzantine and Modern Greek Studies. ISBN 1-884729-66-5. OCLC 51552383.
