= Ephraim of Arizona =

Greek missionary to America (1928–2019)

Archimandrite Ephraim of Arizona and Philotheou
- Native name: Ιωάννης Μωραΐτης
- Church: Greek Orthodox Archdiocese of America

Personal details
- Born: Ioannis Moraitis; 24 June 1928 Volos, Thessaly, Greece
- Died: 7 December 2019 (aged 91) Florence, Arizona, United States
- Denomination: Eastern Orthodoxy
- Profession: Hieromonk

Geronda Ephraim of Arizona and Philotheou (Greek: Γέροντας Ἐφραὶμ Ἀριζόνας-Φιλοθεΐτης; June 24, 1928 – December 7, 2019) was a revered Greek Orthodox hieromonk, Athonite elder, and archimandrite in the Greek Orthodox Archdiocese of America under the Greek Orthodox Patriarchate of Constantinople. He became well known for his extensive spiritual guidance (such as his emphasis of the Jesus Prayer) in Greece and especially in America by spreading Athonite monasticism and the Orthodox faith in America. Many of his followers would seek out his guidance in the form of confession. His spiritual father is Saint Iosif (Joseph) the Hesychast, canonized by the Greek Orthodox Patriarchate of Constantinople.

== Early life and background ==
On June 24, 1928, he was born Ioannis Moraitis (Greek: Ιωάννης Μωραΐτης) in Volos, Greece. His parents were Demetrios and Victoria Moraitis.

Geronda Ephraim entered Mount Athos in 1947, where he was a disciple of the Athonite elder Saint Joseph the Hesychast. On July 13, 1948, he was tonsured and given the monastic name Ephraim. When his spiritual father Joseph the Hesychast died on August 15, 1959, he became the geronda (elder) of the hut of Annunciation of the Theotokos in New Skete. Ephraim soon became the head of his own brotherhood (which grew to 80 monks in 1981) and moved with them to the skete of Provata in 1968. From October 1, 1973, to 1991, Geronda Ephraim served as the abbot of Philotheou Monastery. Through the efforts of Archimandrite Ephraim, monastic life was restored in several sketes on Mount Athos, as his disciples also repopulated the monasteries of Philotheou, Xeropotamou, Konstamonitou, and Karakallou.

In 1979, Geronda Ephraim visited North American cities and met with members of the Greek diaspora.

First he visited parishes in Canada (Toronto, Vancouver, Montreal). Afterwards, people started inviting him to the USA. Similar visits became regular in the United States and Canada. Finally, Archimandrite Ephraim decided to move to the United States for the spiritual nourishment of the flock and for the revival of spiritual life in the Greek Orthodox communities of North America.

== Greek Orthodox Monasteries in the US and Canada founded by Geronda Ephraim ==
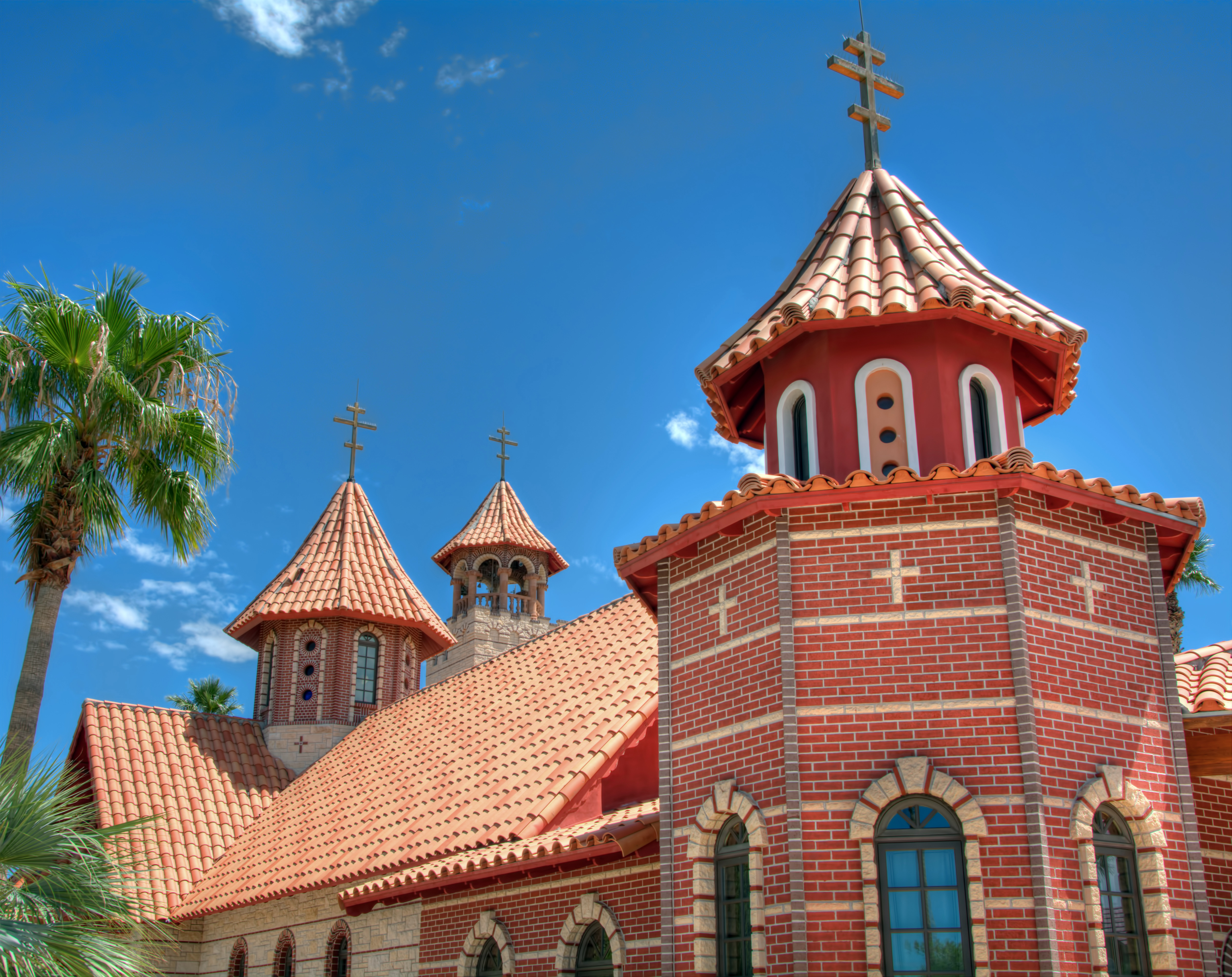
St. Anthony Monastery in Florence, Arizona, US, founded by Ephraim of Arizona

Archimandrite Ephraim devoted his entire life to missionary work, which was based on the opening of Greek Orthodox monasteries in the United States and Canada, which soon became spiritual centers. The first monastery was founded in 1989 (the convent of the Nativity of the Virgin Mary in Pittsburgh, Pennsylvania). In 1995, Archimandrite Ephraim founded the Saint Anthony's Greek Orthodox Monastery in the Sonoran Desert of Arizona in honor of Anthony the Great, where he settled. Totally 19 monasteries were established in the United States and Canada as a result of his work.

The Greek Orthodox monasteries in North America founded by Ephraim of Arizona are:

Nunneries (for women)
Date	Monastery	Location	Ref.
1989	Nativity of the Theotokos Greek Orthodox Monastery	Saxonburg, Pennsylvania, US	
1993	St. Kosmas Aitolos Greek Orthodox Monastery	Bolton, Ontario, Canada	
1993	Panagia Parigoritissa Greek Orthodox Monastery	Brownsburg-Chatham, Quebec, Canada	
1993	St. John Chrysostomos Greek Orthodox Monastery	Pleasant Prairie, Wisconsin, US	
1993	Holy Protection of the Theotokos Greek Orthodox Monastery	White Haven, Pennsylvania, US	
1993	Life-giving Spring of the Theotokos Greek Orthodox Monastery	Dunlap, California, US	
1995	St. John the Honorable Forerunner Greek Orthodox Monastery	Goldendale, Washington, US	
1998	Annunciation of the Theotokos Greek Orthodox Monastery	Reddick, Florida, US	
1998	Panagia Prousiotissa Greek Orthodox Monastery	Troy, North Carolina, US	
2004	St. Paraskevi Greek Orthodox Monastery	Washington, Texas, US	

Monasteries (for men)
Date	Monastery	Location	Ref.
1995	St. Anthony Greek Orthodox Monastery	Florence, Arizona, US	
1996	Holy Archangels Greek Orthodox Monastery	Kendalia, Texas, US	
1998	Panagia Vlahernon Greek Orthodox Monastery	Williston, Florida, US	
1998	Holy Trinity Greek Orthodox Monastery	Smiths Creek, Michigan, US	
1998	Panagia Pammakaristos Greek Orthodox Monastery	Lawsonville, North Carolina, US	
1998	Holy Transfiguration Greek Orthodox Monastery	Harvard, Illinois, US	
1998	St. Nektarios Greek Orthodox Monastery	Roscoe, New York, US	

== Death ==
Archimandrite Ephraim died at St. Anthony Monastery, Arizona, on December 7, 2019, at the age of 91.
