= Gabriel of Dionysiou =

Greek Orthodox Christian monk

Archimandrite Gabriel of Dionysiou
- Native name: Γαβριήλ Διονυσιάτης
- Church: Greek Orthodox Church

Personal details
- Born: Georgios Kazazis (Γεώργιος Καζάζης); 1886 Mesenikolas, Karditsa, Greece
- Died: 6 November 1983 (aged 96–97) Dionysiou Monastery, Mount Athos
- Buried: Dionysiou Monastery, Mount Athos
- Denomination: Eastern Orthodox Christianity
- Residence: Dionysiou Monastery, Mount Athos
- Parents: Theodosius and Constantina Kazazis
- Occupation: Abbot and monk

Archimandrite Gabriel of Dionysiou (or Gabriel Dionysiatis, Greek: Γαβριήλ Διονυσιάτης, romanized: Gavriil Dionysiatis; Mesenikolas, Karditsa, Greece, 1886 – Dionysiou Monastery, Mount Athos, 6 November 1983) was a Greek Orthodox Christian monk who served as the abbot of Dionysiou Monastery from 1936 to the 1970s.

== Early life ==
In 1886, he was born Georgios Kazazis (Γεώργιος Καζάζης) in the village of Mesenikolas in Karditsa, western Thessaly, Greece to Theodosios and Konstantina Kazazis. At the age of 17, he volunteered in the guerrilla army of Pavlos Melas during the Macedonian Struggle. In 1910, he moved to Mount Athos and settled at Dionysiou Monastery. At Mount Athos, he took on the monastic name of Gabriel.

During World War I, he became a prisoner of war and was taken to Bulgaria. After his release, he returned to a monastic life.

In July 1936, he was ordained Abbot of Dionysiou Monastery, succeeding Abbot Dositheos.

During World War II, he played an instrumental role in negotiating with the German occupying forces during the German invasion of Greece and Axis occupation of Greece. As a result, Mount Athos was spared from bloodshed and military conflicts. After World War II, he continued to serve as the abbot of Dionysiou Monastery for three full decades.

In 1979, Charalambos of Dionysiou succeeded Archimandrite Gabriel as Abbot of Dionysiou Monastery.

He died on 6 November 1983 (Old Style date: 25 October 1983).

After his death, several biographies have been written about him, including one in English by Constantine Cavarnos (1999).

== See also ==
- Charalambos of Dionysiou
- Ephraim of Vatopedi
- Joseph the Hesychast
