= Charalambos of Dionysiou =

Greek Orthodox Christian monk

Archimandrite Charalambos of Dionysiou
- Native name: Χαράλαμπος Διονυσιάτης
- Church: Greek Orthodox Church

Personal details
- Born: 1910 Russia
- Died: 1 January 2001 (aged 90–91) Dionysiou Monastery, Mount Athos
- Buried: Dionysiou Monastery, Mount Athos
- Denomination: Eastern Orthodox Christianity
- Residence: Dionysiou Monastery, Mount Athos
- Parents: Theodosius and Constantina Kazazis
- Occupation: Abbot and monk

Archimandrite Charalambos (Galanopoulos) of Dionysiou (or Haralambos Dionysiatis, Greek: Χαράλαμπος Διονυσιάτης; 1910 in Russia – 1 January 2001 in Dionysiou Monastery, Mount Athos) was a Greek Orthodox Christian monk who served as the abbot of Dionysiou Monastery from 1979 to 2000.

== Early life ==
In 1910, he was born in southern Russia to Pontic Greek parents, namely Leonidas (Λεωνίδας) and Despina (Δέσποινα) Galanopoulos. He and his family moved to Arkadiko, Drama (Αρκαδικό της Δράμας) in 1922. He moved to the Little Saint Anne's Skete at Mount Athos in September 1950, where he became a disciple of Joseph the Hesychast. Later, he moved with Joseph the Hesychast and his disciples to New Skete. When Joseph the Hesychast died in 1959, he remained at New Skete until 1967. In 1967, Charalambos and his 12 disciples moved to Bourazeri, near Karyes. By 1979, Charalambos had 20 disciples, among whom was Elder Hilarion of New Skete.

In 1979, he was ordained as the abbot of Dionysiou Monastery, succeeding Archimandrite Gabriel of Dionysiou who had been Abbot of Dionysiou since 1936.

Archimandrite Charalambos died at Dionysiou Monastery on 1 January 2001. His remains were exhumed in 2021.

== See also ==
- Gabriel of Dionysiou
- Ephraim of Vatopedi
- Joseph the Hesychast
