= Robert W. Brooks =

American mathematician (1952–2002)

- Born: Robert Wolfe Brooks; September 16, 1952; Washington, D.C., United States
- Died: September 5, 2002 (aged 49); Montreal, Canada
- Education: Harvard University
- Known for: Spectral geometry, Riemann surfaces, circle packings, differential geometry
- Spouse: Sharon Brooks
- Children: 4
- Awards: Alfred P. Sloan Fellowship, Guastella Fellowship
- Scientific career
- Fields: Mathematics
- Workplaces: University of Maryland, University of Southern California, Technion – Israel Institute of Technology
- Doctoral advisor: Raoul Bott

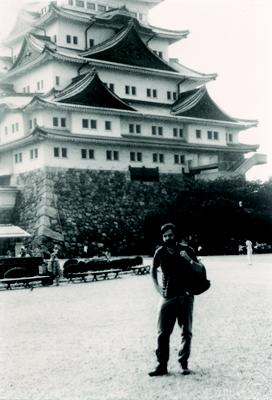
Robert W. Brooks (1985)

Robert Wolfe Brooks (September 16, 1952 – September 5, 2002) was an American mathematician known for his work in spectral geometry, Riemann surfaces, circle packings, and differential geometry.

== Biography ==
Brooks was born in 1952 in Washington, D.C. and grew up in Bethesda, Maryland, where he graduated in 1970 from Walt Whitman High School. In 1974 he completed his Masters thesis from Harvard University; his thesis "Russell, Poincaré, and the foundations of geometry" won him the Bowdoin Prize for Essays in the Natural Sciences in 1975.

He received his Ph.D. from Harvard University in 1977; his thesis, The smooth cohomology of groups of diffeomorphisms, was written under the supervision of Raoul Bott. He then undertook postdoctoral studies with J. Peter Matelski at the State University of New York at Stony Brook, where they created pictures of fractals, leading to Benoit Mandelbrot's creation of the Mandelbrot set in 1980.

He worked at the University of Maryland (1979–1984), then at the University of Southern California, and then, from 1995, at the Technion in Haifa.

Brooks died from heart attack during a visit to Montreal, Canada and was buried in Sde Yehoshua cemetery in Haifa. He was survived by his parents David and Harriet Brooks, his wife Sharon and four children. His eldest son Shimon Brooks is a mathematics professor at Bar-Ilan University.

== Work ==
In an influential paper (Brooks 1981), Brooks proved that the bounded cohomology of a topological space is isomorphic to the bounded cohomology of its fundamental group.

== Honors ==
- Bowdoin Prize for Essays in the Natural Sciences, 1975
- Alfred P. Sloan fellowship
- Guastella fellowship

== Selected publications ==
- Brooks, Robert (1981). "Some remarks on bounded cohomology". Riemann surfaces and related topics: Proceedings of the 1978 Stony Brook Conference (State Univ. New York, Stony Brook, N.Y., 1978). Ann. of Math. Stud. Vol. 97. Princeton, N.J.: Princeton Univ. Press. pp. 53–63. MR 0624804.
- Brooks, Robert (1981). "A relation between growth and the spectrum of the Laplacian". Mathematische Zeitschrift. 178 (4): 501–508. doi:10.1007/BF01174771. MR 0638814. S2CID 122114581.
- Brooks, Robert (1981). "The fundamental group and the spectrum of the Laplacian". Commentarii Mathematici Helvetici. 56 (4): 581–598. doi:10.1007/BF02566228. MR 0656213. S2CID 121175762.
- Brooks, Robert (1988). "Constructing isospectral manifolds". American Mathematical Monthly. 95 (9): 823–839. doi:10.1080/00029890.1988.11972094. MR 0967343.

Reviewer Maung Min-Oo for MathSciNet wrote: "This is a well written survey article on the construction of isospectral manifolds which are not isometric with emphasis on hyperbolic Riemann surfaces of constant negative curvature."

- Brooks, Robert, "Form in Topology", The Magicians of Form, ed. by Robert M. Weiss. Laurelhurst Publications, 2003.
