= Dionysiou Monastery =

Eastern Orthodox monastery, Mount Athos

- Ιερά Μονή Διονυσίου
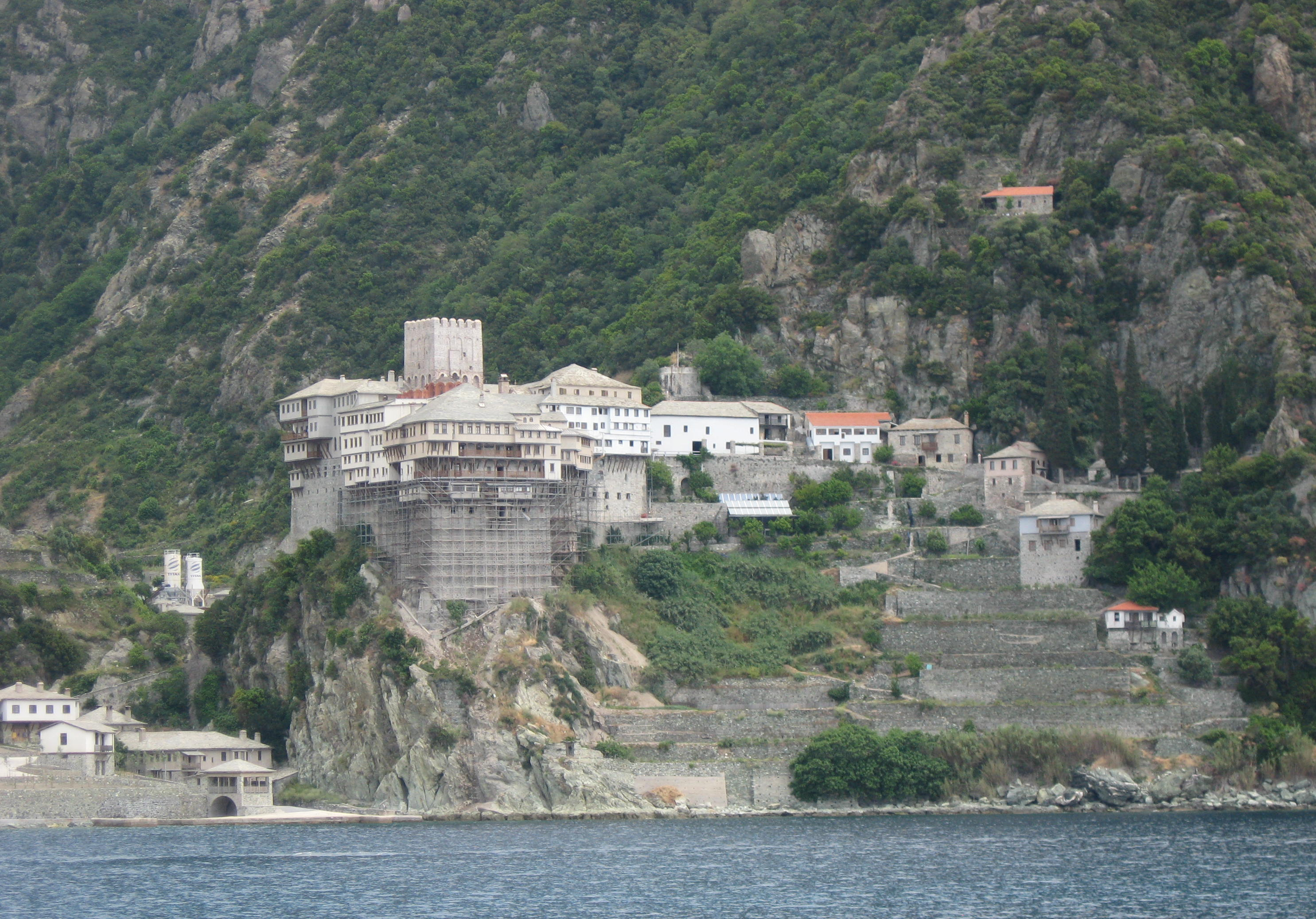
- External view of the monastery

- Location within Mount Athos
- Interactive map of Dionysiou Monastery

Monastery information
- Full name: Holy Monastery of Dionysiou
- Order: Ecumenical Patriarchate
- Established: mid 14th century
- Dedication: John the Baptist
- Diocese: Mount Athos

People
- Founder: Dionysios
- Prior: Archimandrite Elder Petros
- Important associated figures: Nicodemus the Hagiorite

Architecture
- Style: Byzantine

Site
- Location: Mount Athos, Greece
- Coordinates: 40°10′04.88″N 24°16′25.91″E
- Public access: Men only

Dionysiou Monastery (Greek: Μονή Διονυσίου) is an Eastern Orthodox monastery at the monastic state of Mount Athos in Greece, at the southwest part of the Athos peninsula. The monastery ranks fifth in the hierarchy of the Athonite monasteries. It is one of the twenty self-governing monasteries in Athos, and is dedicated to John the Baptist.

== History ==
The monastery is named after Saint Dionysius of Korisos, who founded it in the 14th century. Dionysius' brother was the metropolitan of Trebizond, whose ruler Alexios III Komnenos was the main benefactor of the monastery during its founding. His chrysobull from September 1374 is currently kept in the archives of Dionysiou Monastery. A passage from the chrysobull states that:

For all emperors, kings, or rulers of note have built monasteries on Mount Athos for their eternal memory; and since the emperor of Trebizond surpasses many of them, he too should add a new foundation in order to live eternally in the memory of the people and to enjoy unending pleasures of the soul.

By the end of the 15th century, the Russian pilgrim Isaiah confirms that the monastery was Serbian.

The library of the monastery housed 804 manuscripts and more than 4,000 printed books. The oldest manuscripts come from the 11th century.

Today, the monastery has a community of around 50 monks.

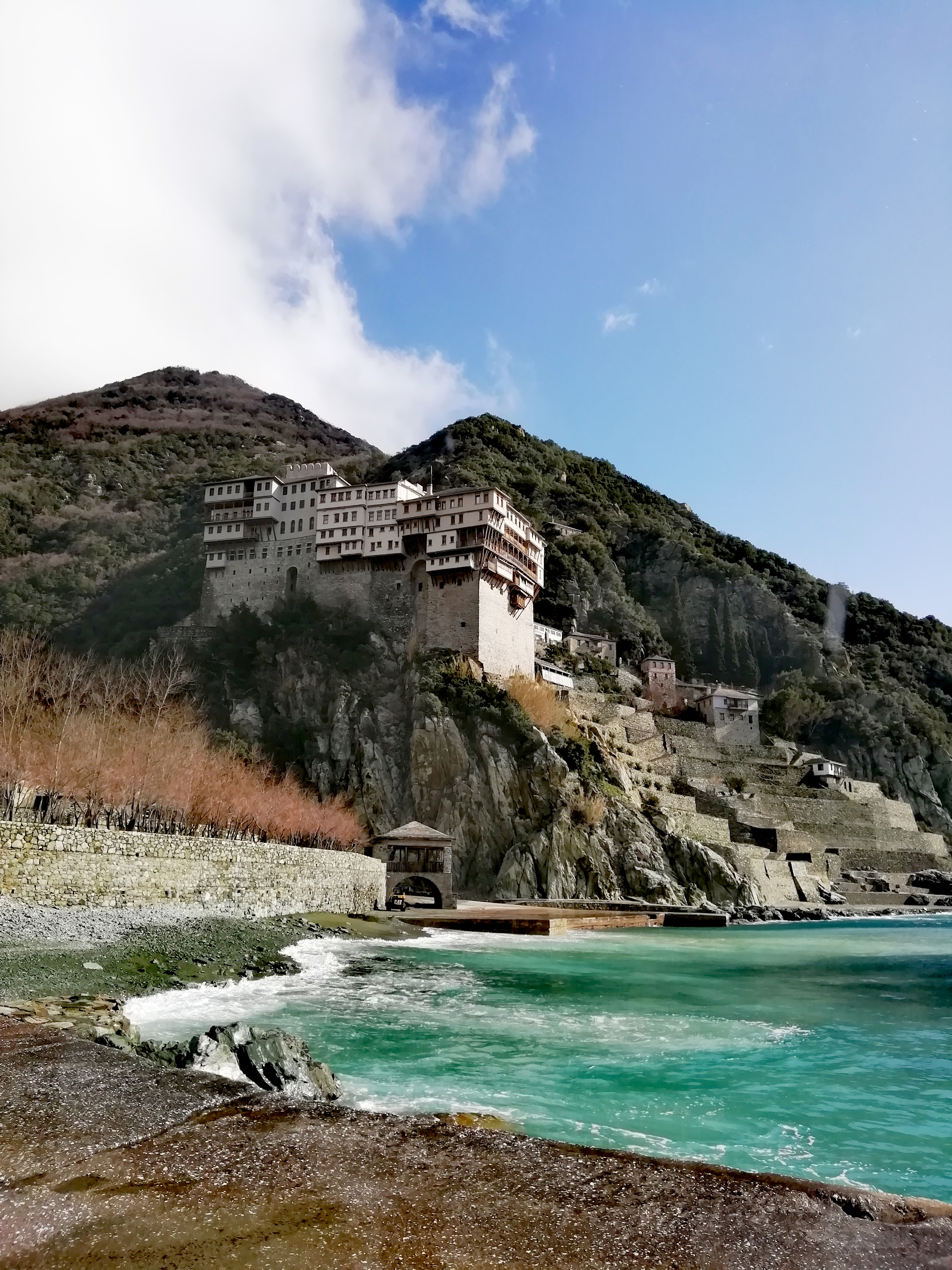
the monastery as seen from a nearby cliff

== Notable people ==
- Nephon II of Constantinople
- Saint Joseph of Dionysiou (d. 17 February 1819)
- Arsenios the Cave Dweller (resident from 1980–1983)

=== Partial list of abbots ===
- Dositheos of Dionysiou (abbot until 1936)
- Elder Gabriel Dionysiatis (or Gabriel of Dionysiou, 1886–6 November 1983), Abbot of Dionysiou Monastery for 40 years during the mid-1900s
- Elder Haralambos Dionysiatis (or Charalambos of Dionysiou, 1886–6 November 1983), Abbot of Dionysiou Monastery from 1979 to 2000
- Peter of Dionysiou (current abbot)

== Manuscripts ==
- Codex Athous Dionysiou = Uncial 045 (Ω)
- Uncial 050

== Gallery ==
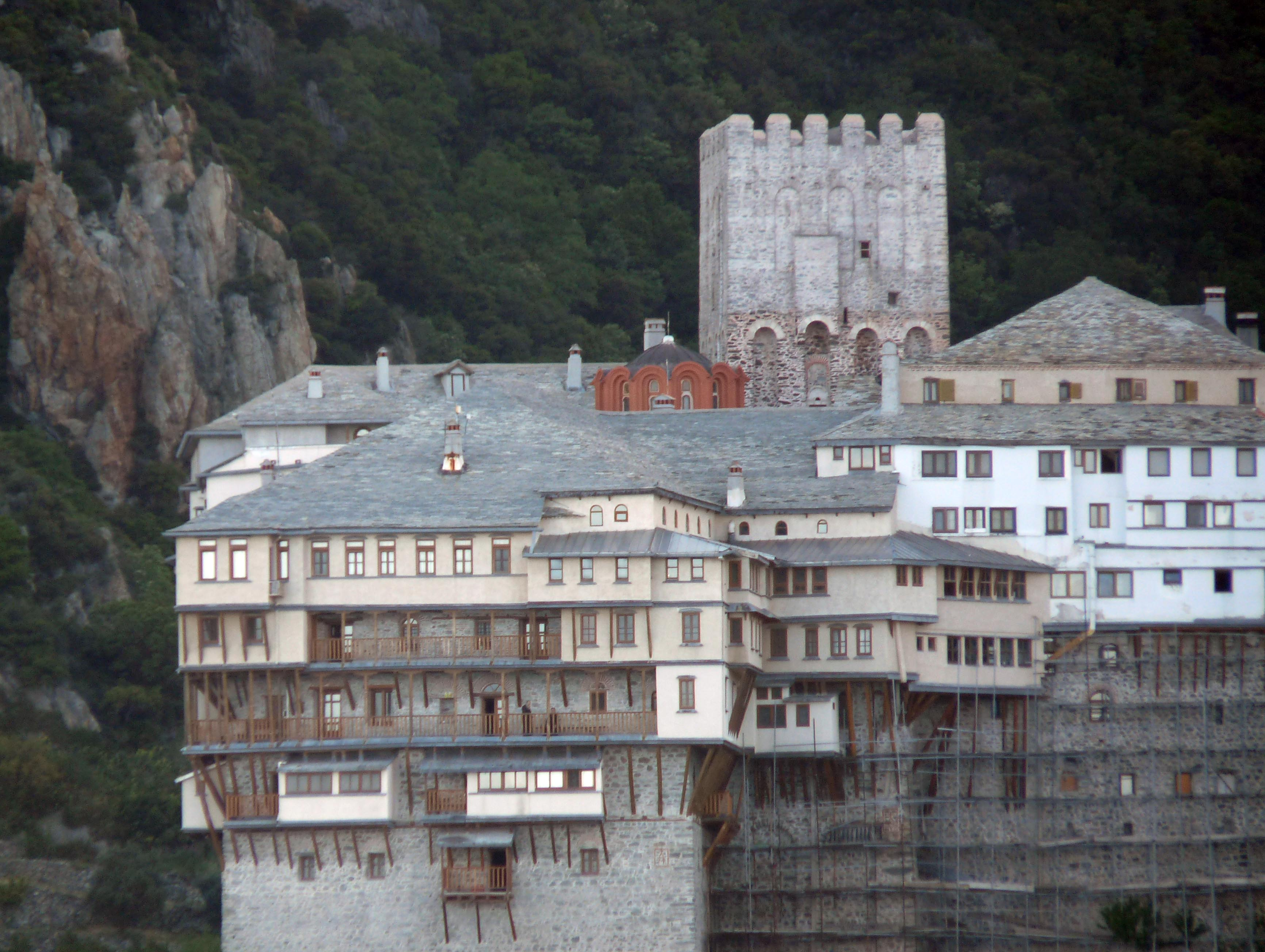

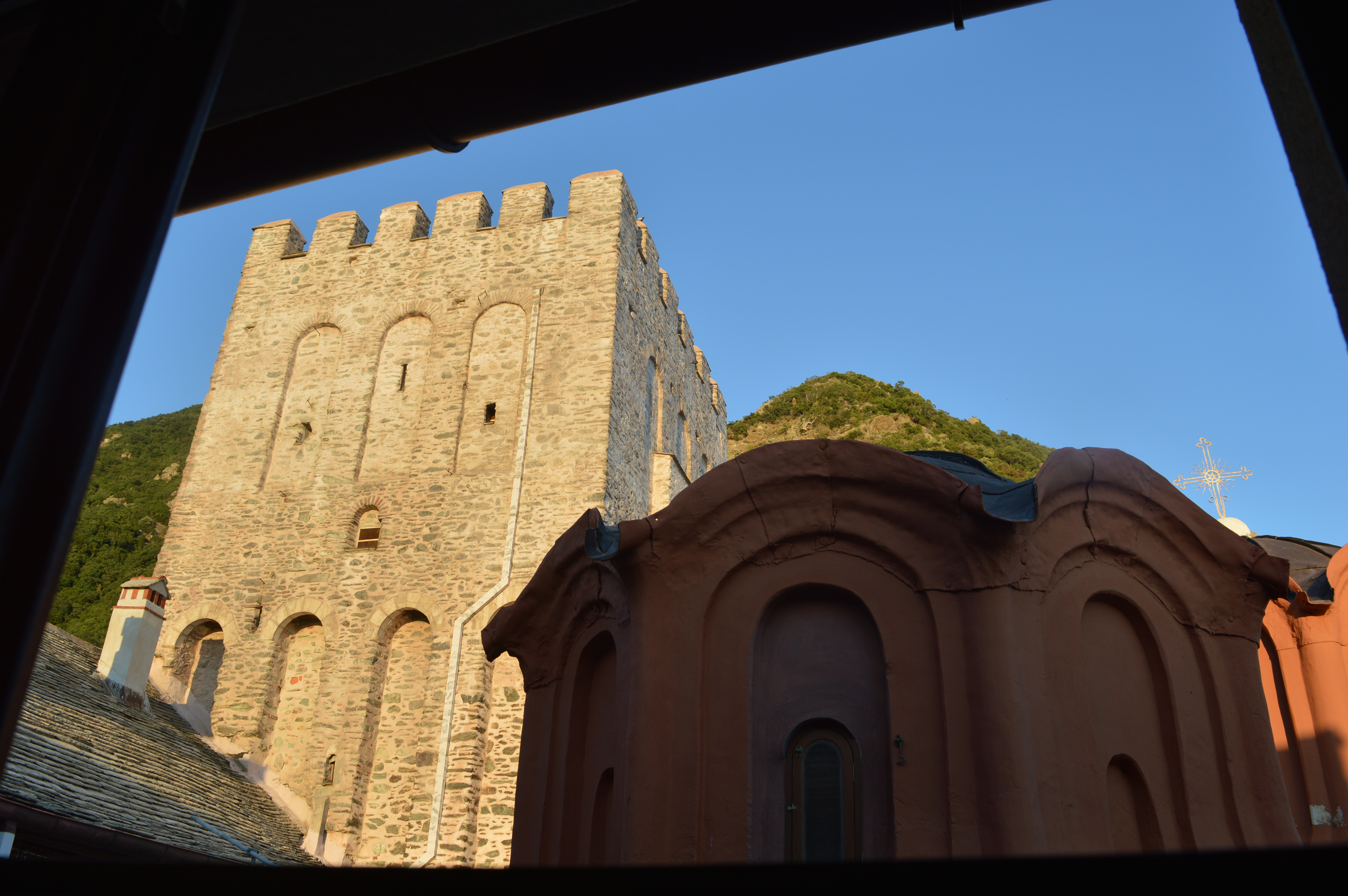
Interior

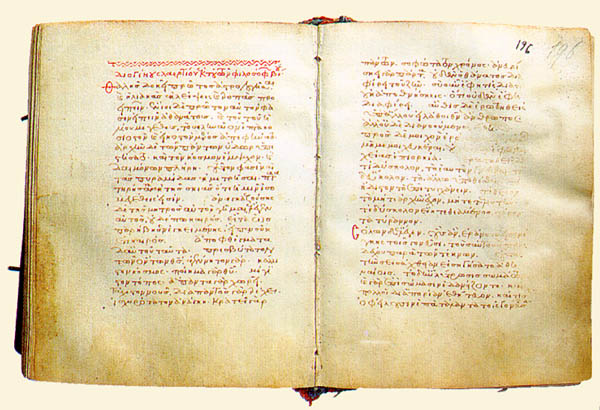
Dionysiou monastery, codex 90, a 13th-century manuscript containing selections from Herodotus, Plutarch and (shown here) Diogenes Laërtius

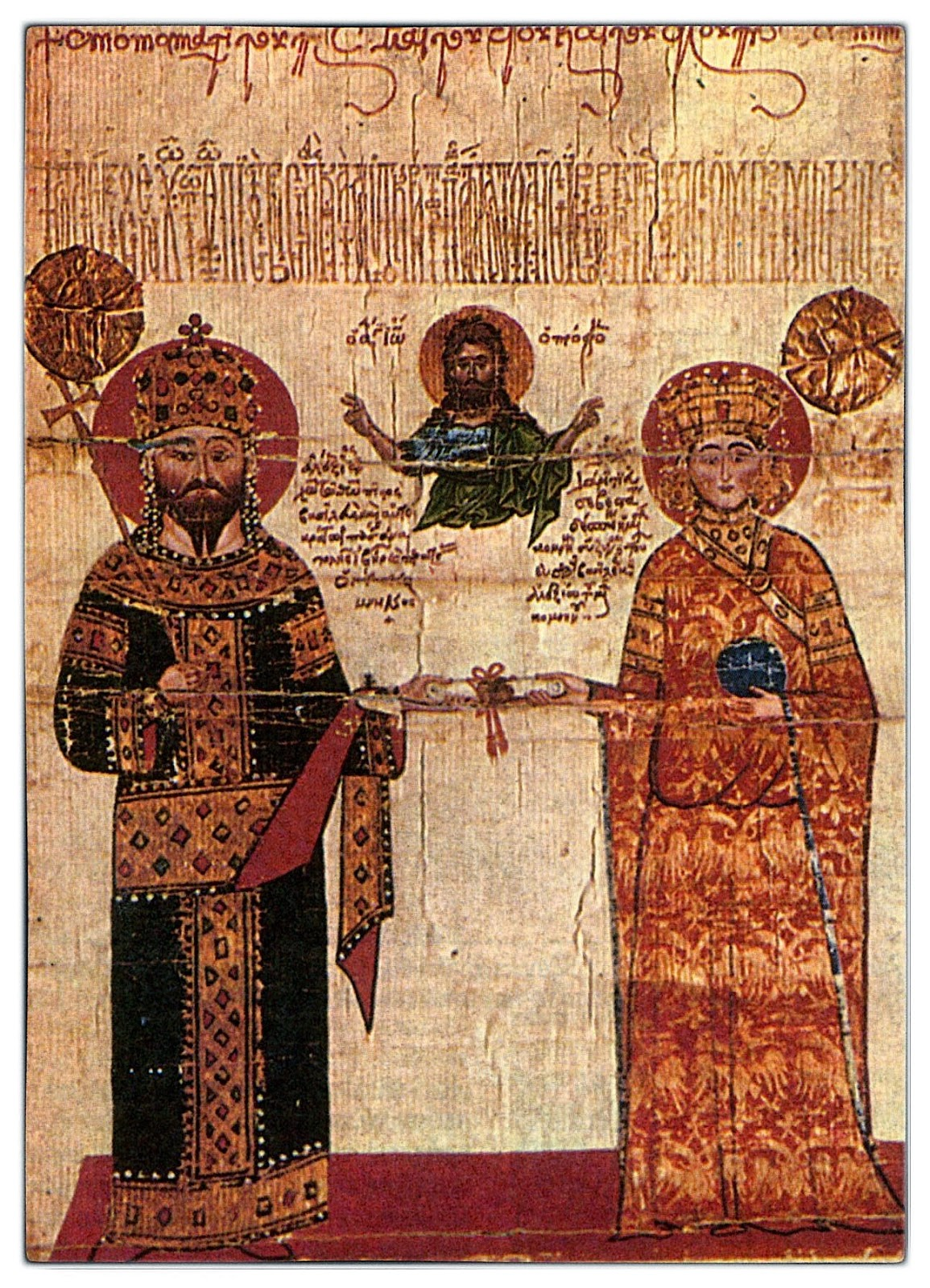
Chrysobull of Alexios III of Trebizond
