= Channing Rudd =

Channing Rudd (1875 – November 8, 1920) was an American government official, lawyer, and academic administrator, who served as registrar of Columbia University and later as comptroller of the Government Loan Organization of the Federal Reserve Bank of New York during the final years of World War I and its aftermath. He was also a founder, with a number of other leaders in various government offices, of the unsuccessful Intercontinental Correspondence University.

== Early life, education, and career ==
Born in Tiskilwa, Illinois, Rudd was educated in both the western and eastern United States. At the age of 21, he gained admission to the bar, and was later admitted to practice before the Supreme Court of the United States.

Rudd practiced corporation law in Washington, D.C., before entering academia. He spent five years at Columbia University, where he served as registrar, librarian, and professor of law. He was also a member of the faculty of New York University for three years. A 1903 report identifies Rudd as "secretary of the schools of law" for Columbia University, in which role he was the organizer of a parade and event for the university students and faculty. He was a participant in the early years of the Association of American Law Schools, being designated to represent Columbia in that body, and being elected to its membership to on behalf of the District of Columbia. In 1904, Rudd was one of the founders of the Intercontinental Correspondence University. The report of its establishment noted:

The incorporators and the trustees are Justice David J. Brewer and Justice Henry Brown of the supreme court of the United States, Senator Chauncey M. Depew of New York, the Rev. Edward Everett Hale, Senator George F. Hoar of Massachusetts, Henry B. F. MacFarland, commissioner of the District of Columbia, Channing Rudd, registrar of Columbia university, Martin A. Knapp, chairman of the interstate commerce commission, and Walter C. Clephane, a prominent Washington attorney. The Capital stock is $1,000,000 divided into 10,000 shares at $100 each. The object of the corporation is stated to be "to give and furnish instructions by mail or otherwise, in any or all branches of knowledge in any or all parts of the world".

Rudd, as manager of the corporation, said that they expected to build "a great educational institution of world-wide extent with headquarters in Washington". By 1909, however, it was reported that Rudd had filed a lawsuit against the entity, seeking over $11,000.

== Wall Street Journal, banking, and Federal Reserve work ==
After leaving academia, Rudd became department manager for The Wall Street Journal and later founded and directed the Finance Forum at the West Side YMCA in New York City. He then served for six years as manager of investments at the Baltimore banking house of Alexander Brown & Sons and was vice president of the Maryland Bankers Association.

With the launch of the Liberty Loan campaigns during World War I, Rudd was appointed executive manager for the state of Maryland and later transferred to New York City to oversee the administration of the Liberty Loan partial payment plans. He joined the Federal Reserve Bank of New York in 1918 and administered the partial payment plans for the Third, Fourth, and Victory Liberty Loans. After the end of the active Liberty Loan campaigns, he was placed in charge of the continuing Government Loan Organization, with the official title of comptroller. In this role, he directed the sale of Treasury Savings Certificates, War Savings Stamps, and Thrift Stamps throughout the Federal Reserve district. In November 1919, Rudd convened a meeting of several hundred civic leaders to launch a Treasury-sponsored thrift campaign. He urged attendees to organize local committees and promote the Treasury's "Work and Save" program, advocating for a combination of increased production and increased personal savings, and reduction of unnecessary spending as essential to postwar economic stability. His work in this capacity ended with his death in 1920.

== Personal life ==
On October 28, 1903, Rudd married Florence Stevens of Washington, D.C., a noted violinist. They had six children who survived Rudd. Florence later remarried to Portland, Maine, organist Will Macfarlane.

Rudd died suddenly of heart disease on November 8, 1920, at the age of 45. He collapsed in a drugstore in Hoboken, New Jersey, after becoming ill while commuting from his home in Morris Plains, New Jersey, to the Federal Reserve Bank in New York. He died before an ambulance from St. Mary’s Hospital could arrive. He was survived by his wife and six children.
