= Intercontinental Correspondence University =

Educational institution in Washington D.C.,

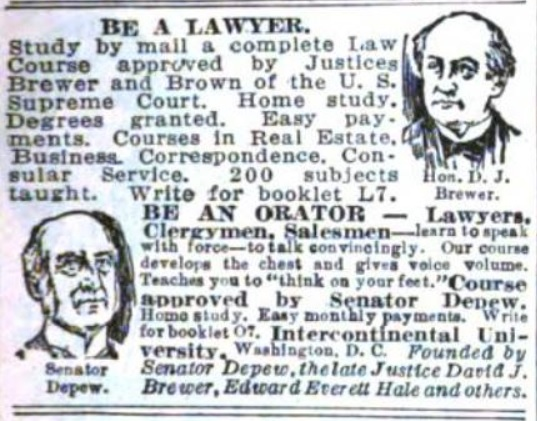
1913 advertisement for Intercontinental University, with images of Senator Chauncey Depew and Justice David J. Brewer

The Intercontinental Correspondence University (sometimes called the Intercontinental University) was an educational institution founded in Washington, D.C., in 1904 by several nationally prominent figures including U.S. Senators Chauncey Depew of New York and George F. Hoar of Massachusetts, Chaplain of the United States Senate Edward Everett Hale, and Supreme Court Justice David J. Brewer, remaining active for the rest of the 1900s and into the 1910s. The institution was unable to turn a profit, and went into receivership in 1913, before ultimately being dissolved in 1915.

== History ==
The Intercontinental Correspondence University was announced to have been incorporated in Washington, D.C., in August 1904, with a capital stock of $1,000,000. The report of its establishment noted:

The incorporators and the trustees are Justice David J. Brewer and Justice Henry Brown of the supreme court of the United States, Senator Chauncey M. Depew of New York, the Rev. Edward Everett Hale, Senator George F. Hoar of Massachusetts, Henry B. F. MacFarland, commissioner of the District of Columbia, Channing Rudd, registrar of Columbia university, Martin A. Knapp, chairman of the interstate commerce commission, and Walter C. Clephane, a prominent Washington attorney. The Capital stock is $1,000,000 divided into 10,000 shares at $100 each. The object of the corporation is stated to be "to give and furnish instructions by mail or otherwise, in any or all branches of knowledge in any or all parts of the world".

Channing Rudd, as manager of the corporation, said that they expected to build "a great educational institution of world-wide extent with headquarters in Washington". It was further asserted that the many prominent men involved in the establishment of the entity were "interested because of the possibilities they saw in the scheme for diffusing knowledge and education".

James C. Fernald was dean of the institution from 1905 to 1909. Francis A. Springer then became dean, serving until his death in 1911.

The institution ran into difficulties early in its existence. In 1905, a "complaint was made against the postal agency at Shanghai by a correspondent who had experienced trouble with his mail". Specifically, "Mr. John Franklin Crowell of the Intercontinental Correspondence University, wrote to Washington that 'owing to the notorious carelessness and supreme indifference of the Consular post office,' it was necessary for all mail sent to him through the agency to be registered". In 1909, it was reported that incorporator Channing Rudd had filed a lawsuit against the entity, seeking over $11,000.

== Receivership and dissolution ==
On August 11, 1913, nine years to the day from the announcement of its incorporation, Associate Justice Job Barnard of the Supreme Court of the District of Columbia appointed Edwin C. Dutton as receiver of the Intercontinental Correspondence University, pursuant to a petition for voluntary dissolution. At that time, the assets of the institution were described as consisting of "furniture valued at $685 and accounts receivable estimated at $5,000".

The present trustees say that the score of the corporation has never obtained and for the past year the business has been conducted without profit to its stockholders. The debts of the concern are said to be about $5,000.

The petitioning trustees are Judge James R. Caton. Alfred B. Leet. A B. Duvall, B. A. Leavell. C. E. Miller. Judge Martin A. Knapp, William H. Saunders and J. Randall Caton, Jr. Attorney E. C. Dutton, representing the petitioners, totaled that the present trustees are unable to tell whether the entire million-dollar capitalization had been paid In. It is understood, however, that several hundred thousand dollars were spent in an effort to build up the university.

Among the list of subscribers to the original stock which was divided into 10,000 shares of $100 each were Chauncey M. Depew of New York for 503 shares; C. M. Depew. for 200 shares; Charles M. Campbell of Washington, for 1,022 shares; Frank G. Carpenter, 250 shares; Judge James R. Caton of Alexandria, shares; Charles B. Wood of this city, 230 shares; Alfred B. 471 shares; Judge Martin A. Knapp, 52 shares; Channing Rudd of New York, 105 shares; William H. Saunders, shares, and W. S. Evans of Chicago, 12 shares. There were several Investors having less than ten shares each.

Dissolution of the institution was completed in 1915, with creditors being publicly notified to "present their claims to said receiver at the Columbian building, Washington, D. C., on or before the 5th day of July, 1915".
