= St. Anthony's Greek Orthodox Monastery (Florence, Arizona) =

Monastery in Pinal County, Arizona

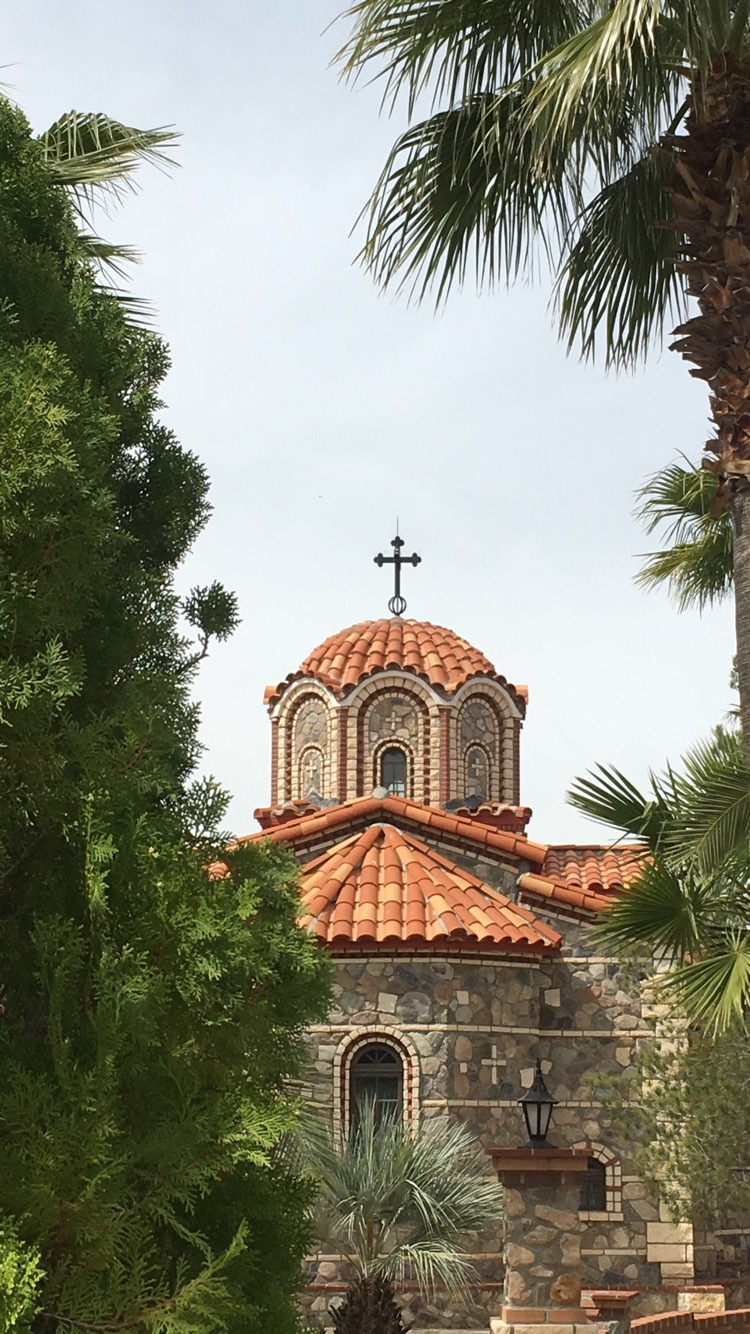

- Location within Arizona
- Interactive map of St. Anthony's Greek Orthodox Monastery

Monastery information
- Established: 1995
- Dedication: Saint Anthony the Great
- Diocese: Greek Orthodox Archdiocese of America

People
- Founder: Elder Ephraim of Arizona

Site
- Location: Florence, Arizona
- Country: United States
- Coordinates: 32.92°N 111.25°W
- Public access: Yes

St. Anthony's Greek Orthodox Monastery is a Greek Orthodox monastery in the Sonoran Desert outside Florence, Arizona, United States. It was established in 1995 in the name of Saint Anthony the Great and is the largest Orthodox monastic complex in the Western Hemisphere. The monastery is home to approximately 50 monks as of 2021.

St. Anthony's grounds include an eponymous church, seven chapels, a central courtyard, and a bookstore. The monastery is open to both Orthodox and non-Orthodox visitors at no cost. Pilgrims can arrange to stay at the monastery in guest facilities, and other visitors are invited daily from 10:30 am to 2:30 pm. All visitors must adhere to specific rules of conduct, such as refraining from speaking loudly and from smoking, and wear "modest and loose-fitting" clothing along with shoes or sandals.

== History ==
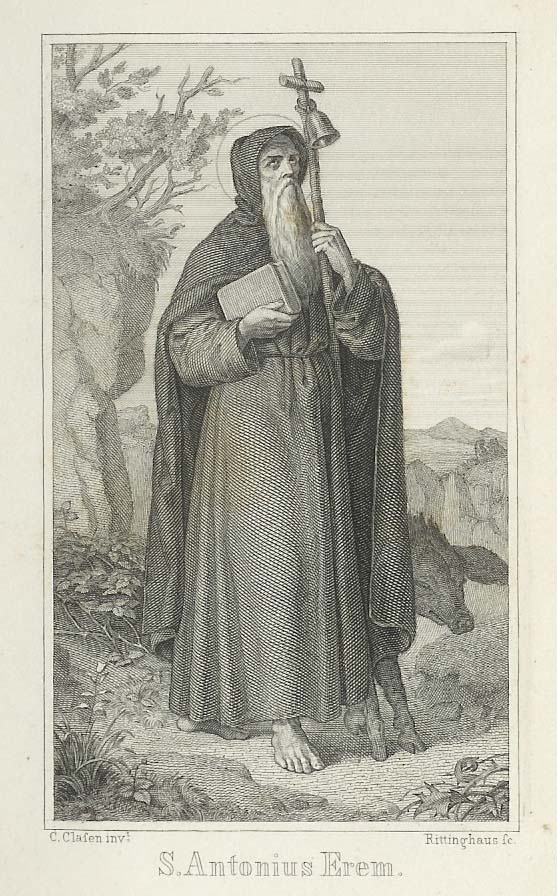
St. Anthony the Great, to whom the monastery is dedicated.

In the summer of 1995, Elder Ephraim—a former abbot of Philotheou Monastery on Mount Athos with a history of restoring and repopulating previous monasteries—sent six monks of Athonite heritage to the Sonoran Desert of Arizona with aims to establish a new monastery in the name of Saint Anthony the Great, the father of monasticism. The fathers began by building the main church, monastic living quarters, the dining hall, and some guest facilities. They also began a vegetable garden, a small vineyard, citrus orchards, and an olive grove amidst the desert landscape. These areas are now interconnected by an elaborate system of gardens, pathways, and gazebos with Spanish fountains.

While the entire monastery is dedicated to Saint Anthony the Great, within its grounds are chapels dedicated to Seraphim of Sarov, Demetrius of Thessaloniki, John the Baptist, George the Martyr, Nicholas the Wonderworker, and Panteleimon the Healer. The main church is dedicated to Saint Anthony and Nectarios of Aegina.

In the summer of 2008, a new chapel in the name of the Prophet Elias was completed on the hill east of the monastery. The chapel's first liturgy was celebrated on the feast day of its eponymous prophet. The chapel can be seen from up to five miles away.

== Monasticism ==
"Living in a city does not prevent us from carrying out God's commandments if we are zealous, and silence and solitude are of no benefit if we are slothful and neglectful."

— Symeon the New Theologian

=== Lifestyle ===
The monks of St. Anthony's Monastery practice Hesychasm (a mystical tradition of contemplative prayer) and adhere to the cenobitic monasticism. This includes a daily schedule of prayer and work under obedience to their abbot, who assumes the role of their spiritual father. Their routine begins at midnight with time for personal prayer and spiritual reading, followed by the cycle of morning prayers and the Divine Liturgy. Next is a light breakfast and a period of rest before they begin their work day, attend to their prayers, and complete various tasks until evening. Of these tasks include, but are not limited to gardening, groundskeeping, construction, vine dressing, woodworking, publishing, icon writing, food preparation, and tending to the hospitality of any guests of the monastery. Their day finishes with evening vespers and dinner.

=== Demographics ===
Most of the resident monks are Greek and Greek-American by heritage; many community members (approximately 50 to 80 on an average Sunday) are also Greek-American. There are no female initiates, though women-only centers do exist in other parts of the United States.

== Gallery ==
=== Grounds ===
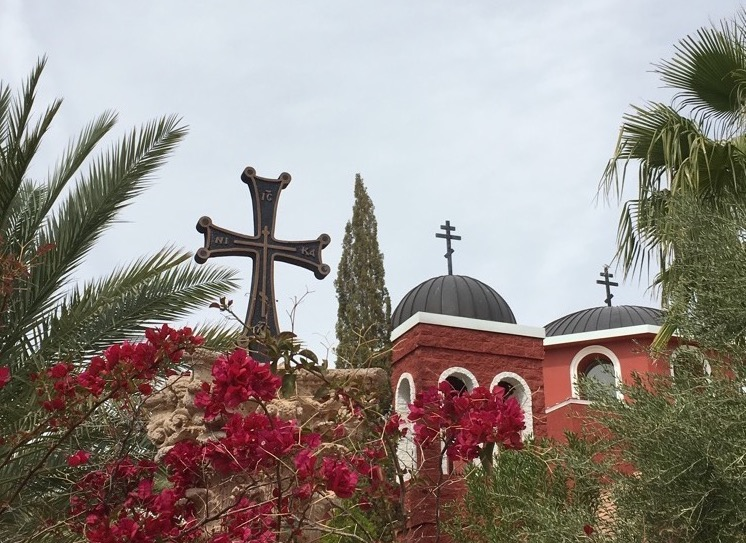

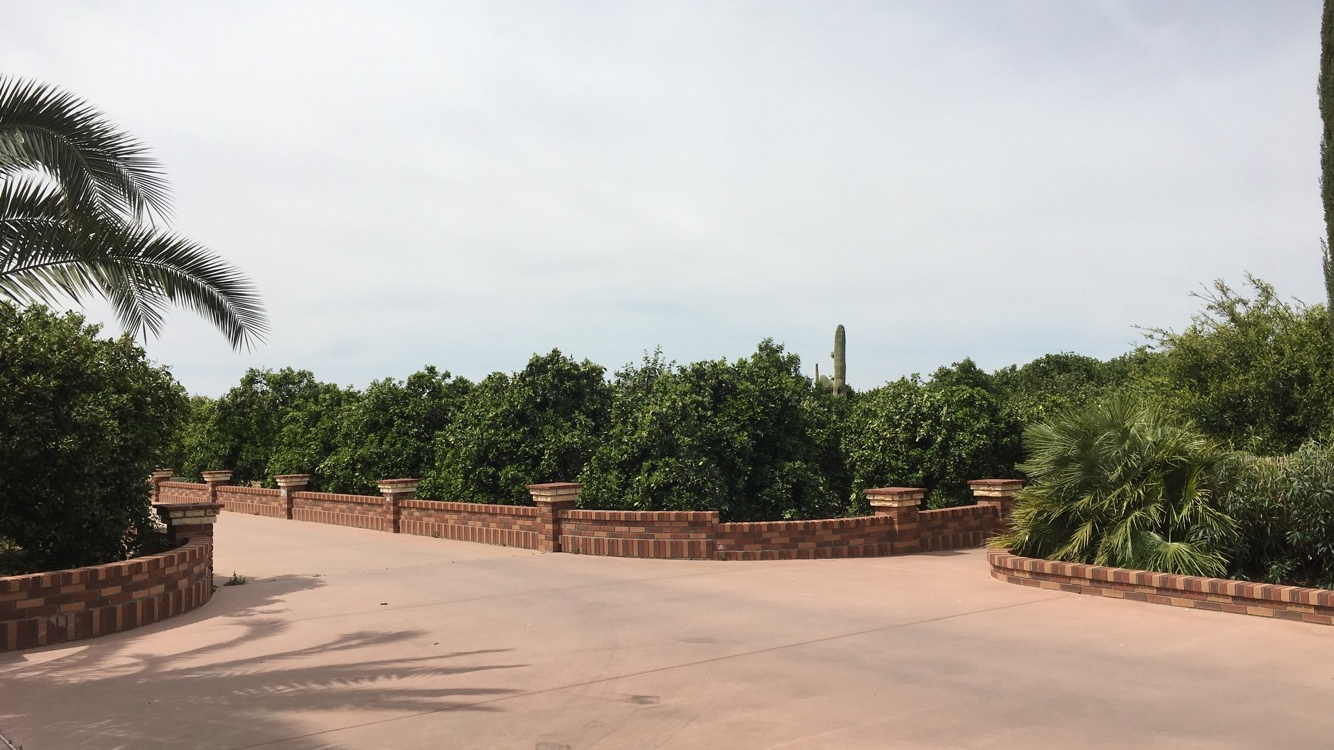

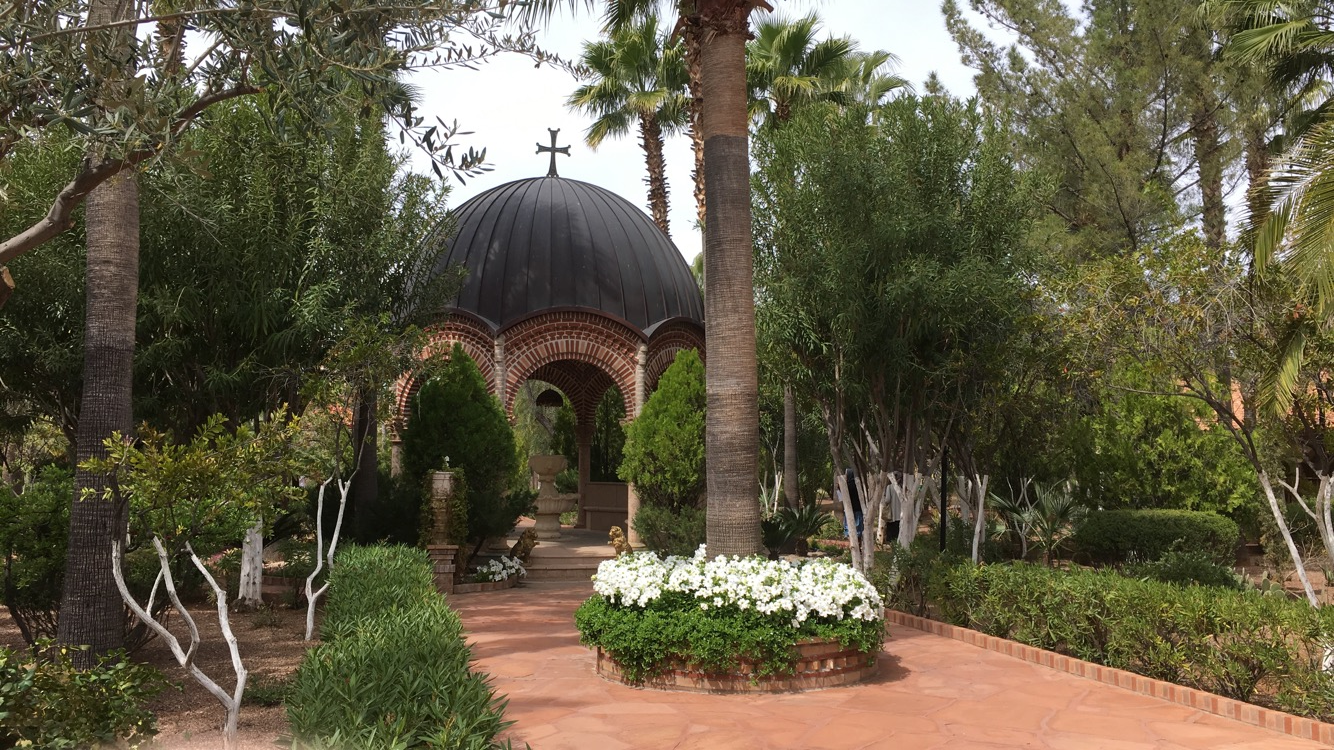

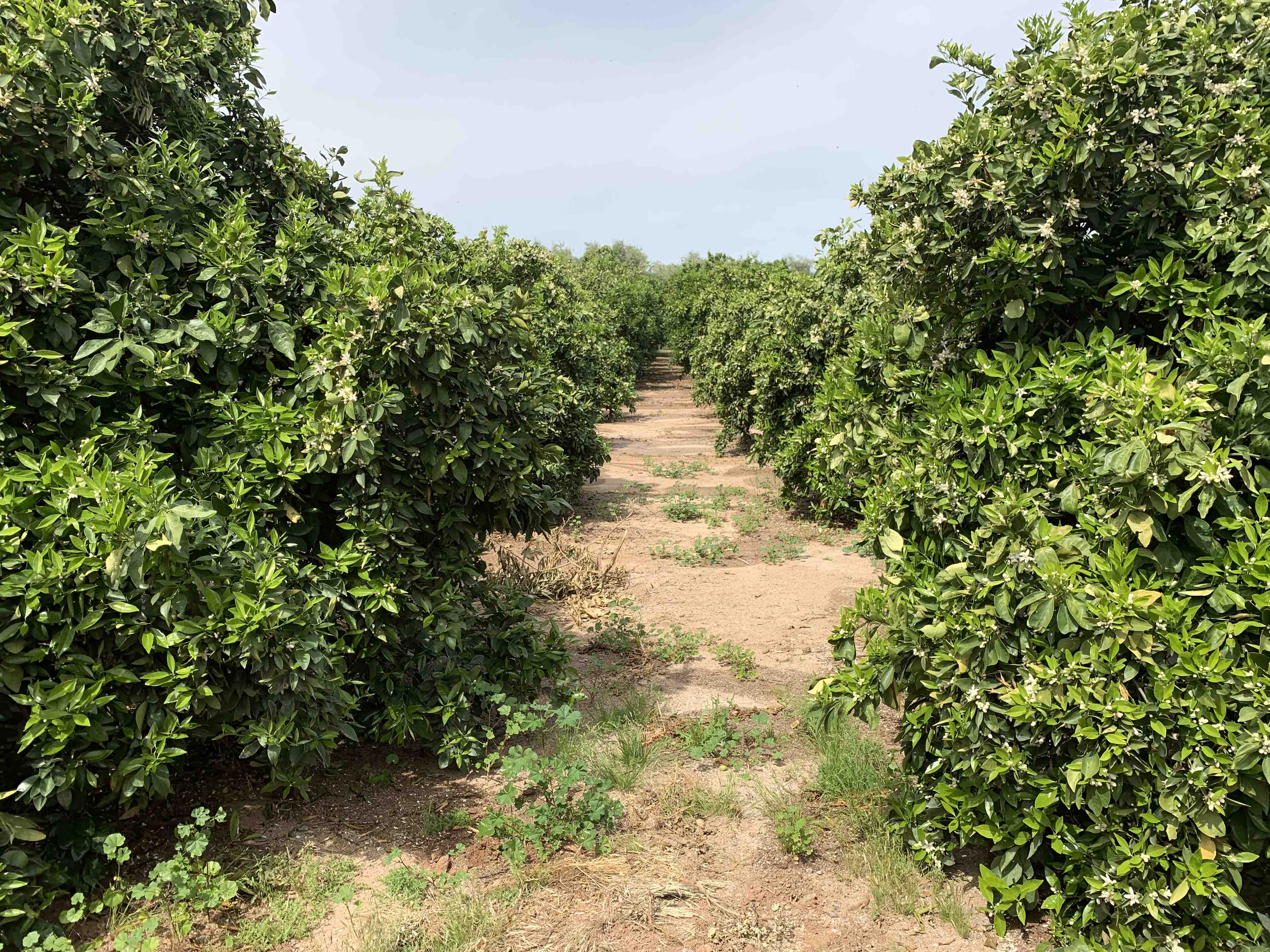

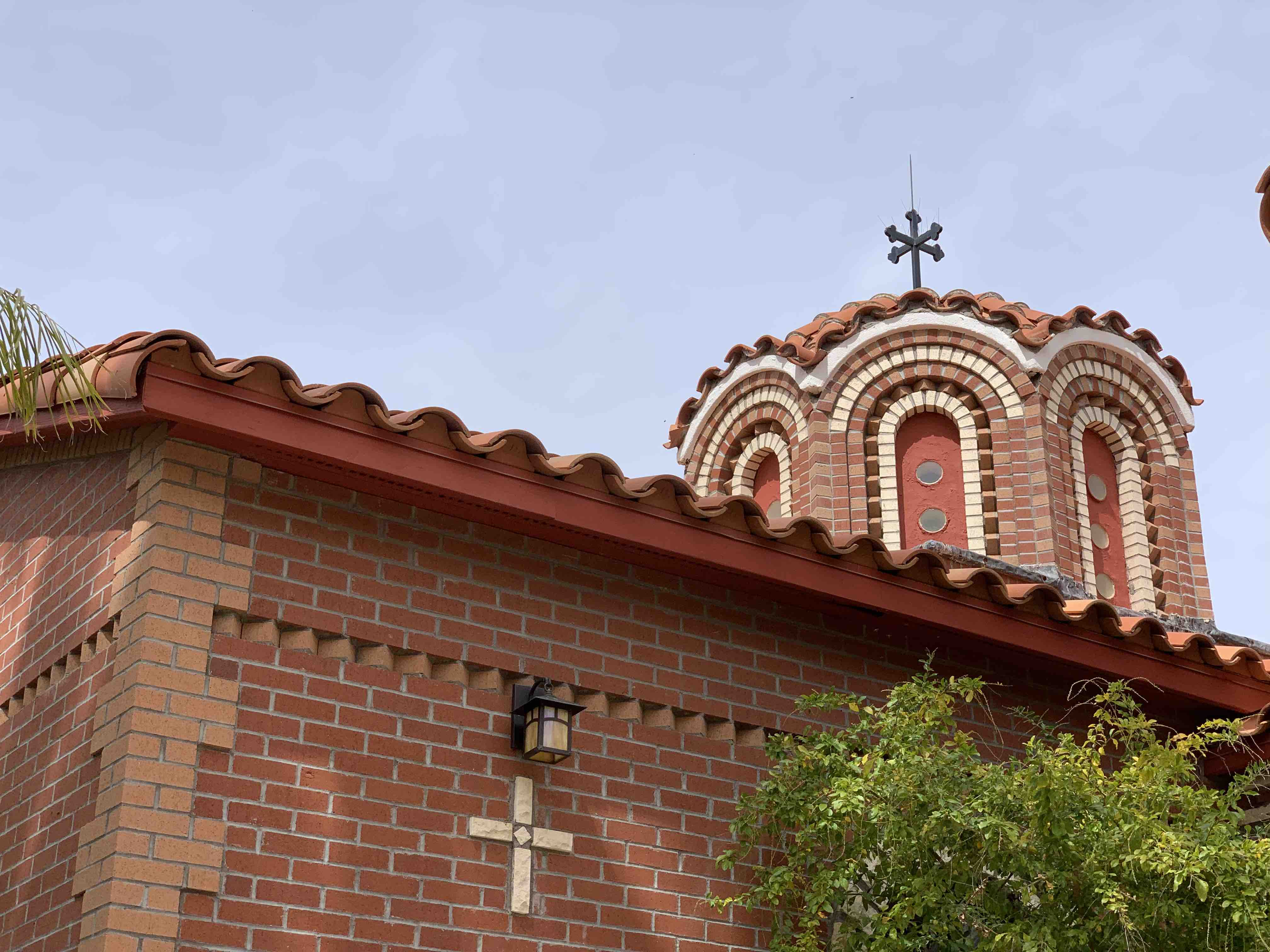

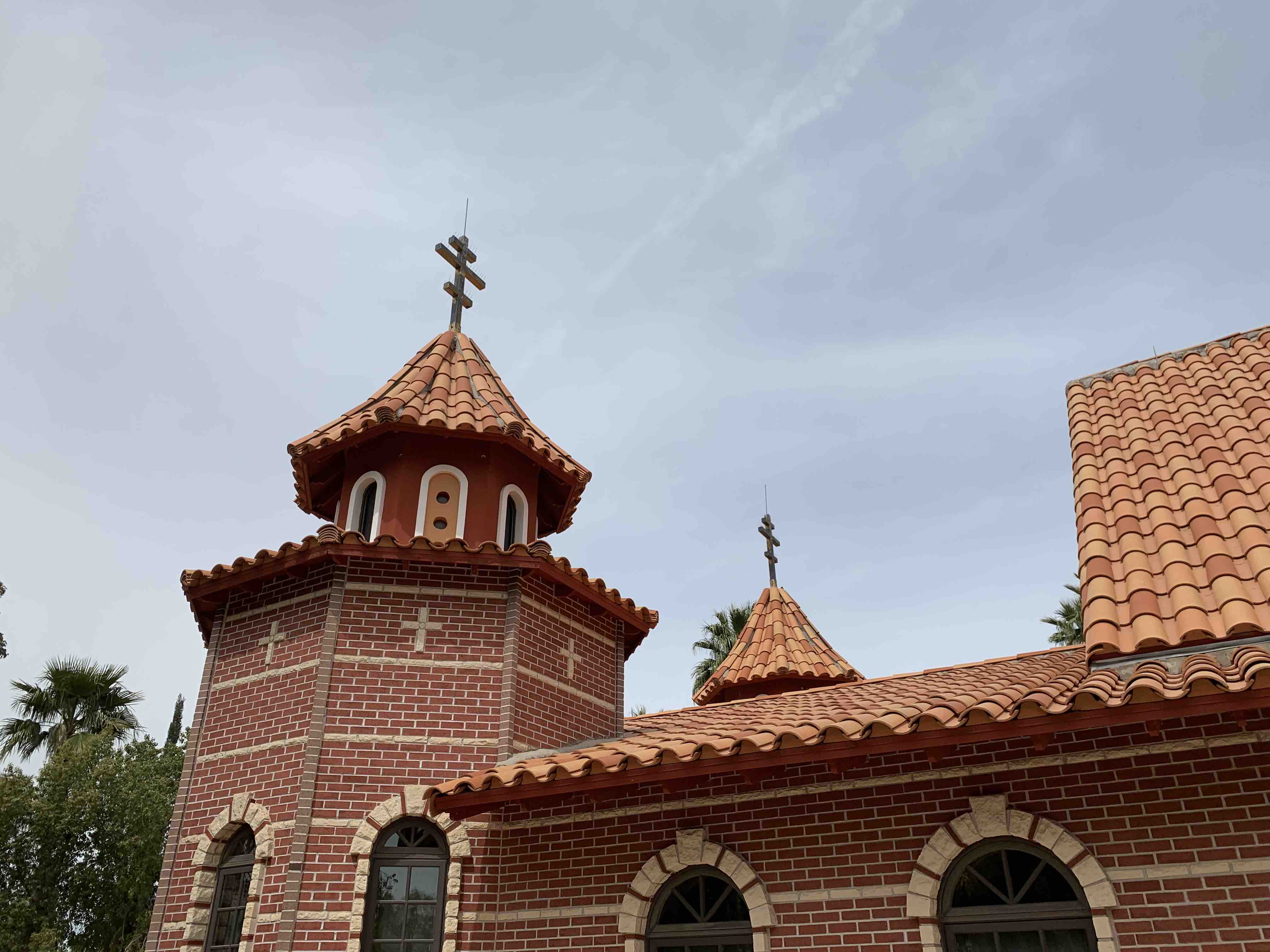

=== Iconography ===
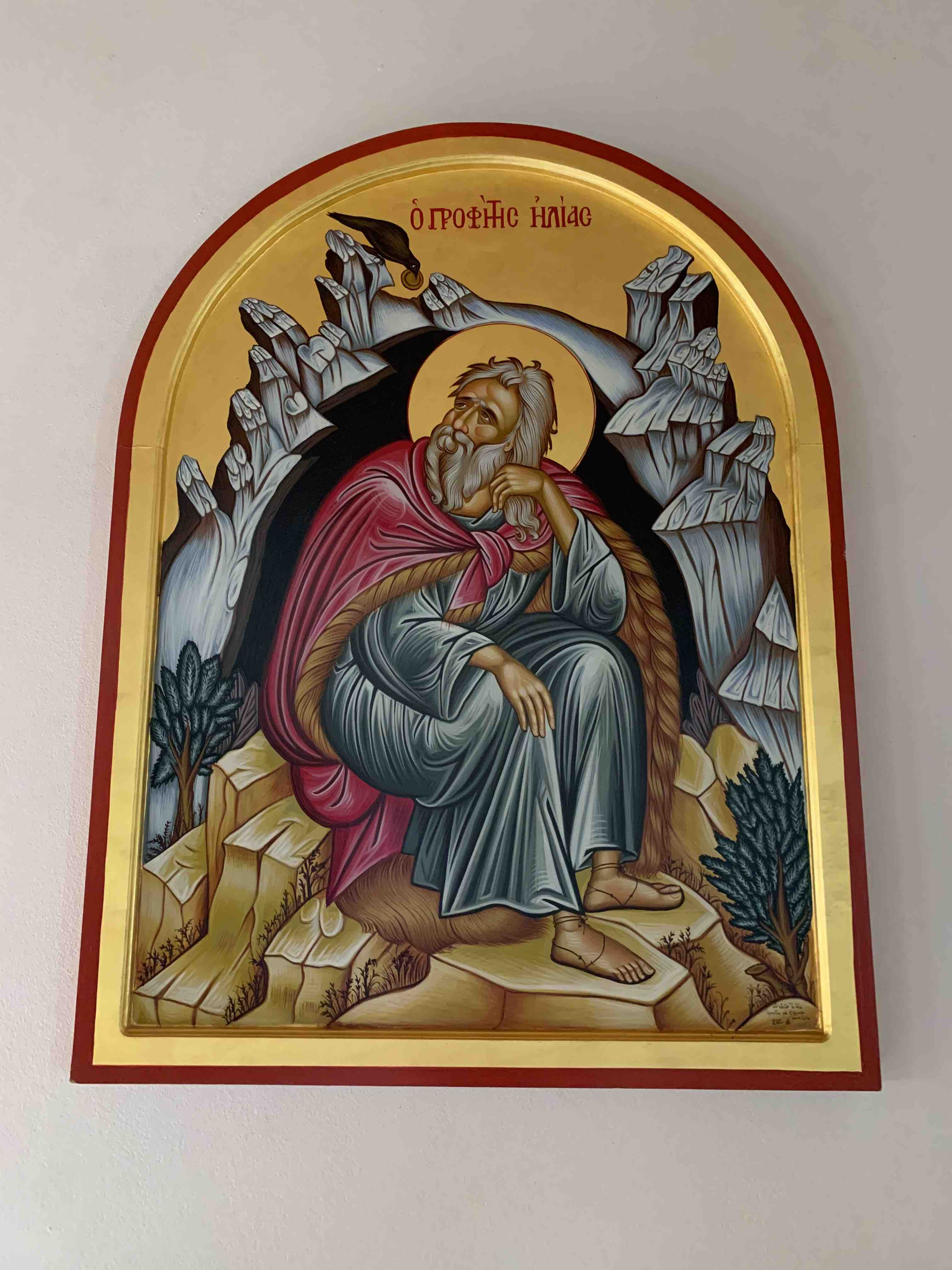
Icon of Prophet Elias

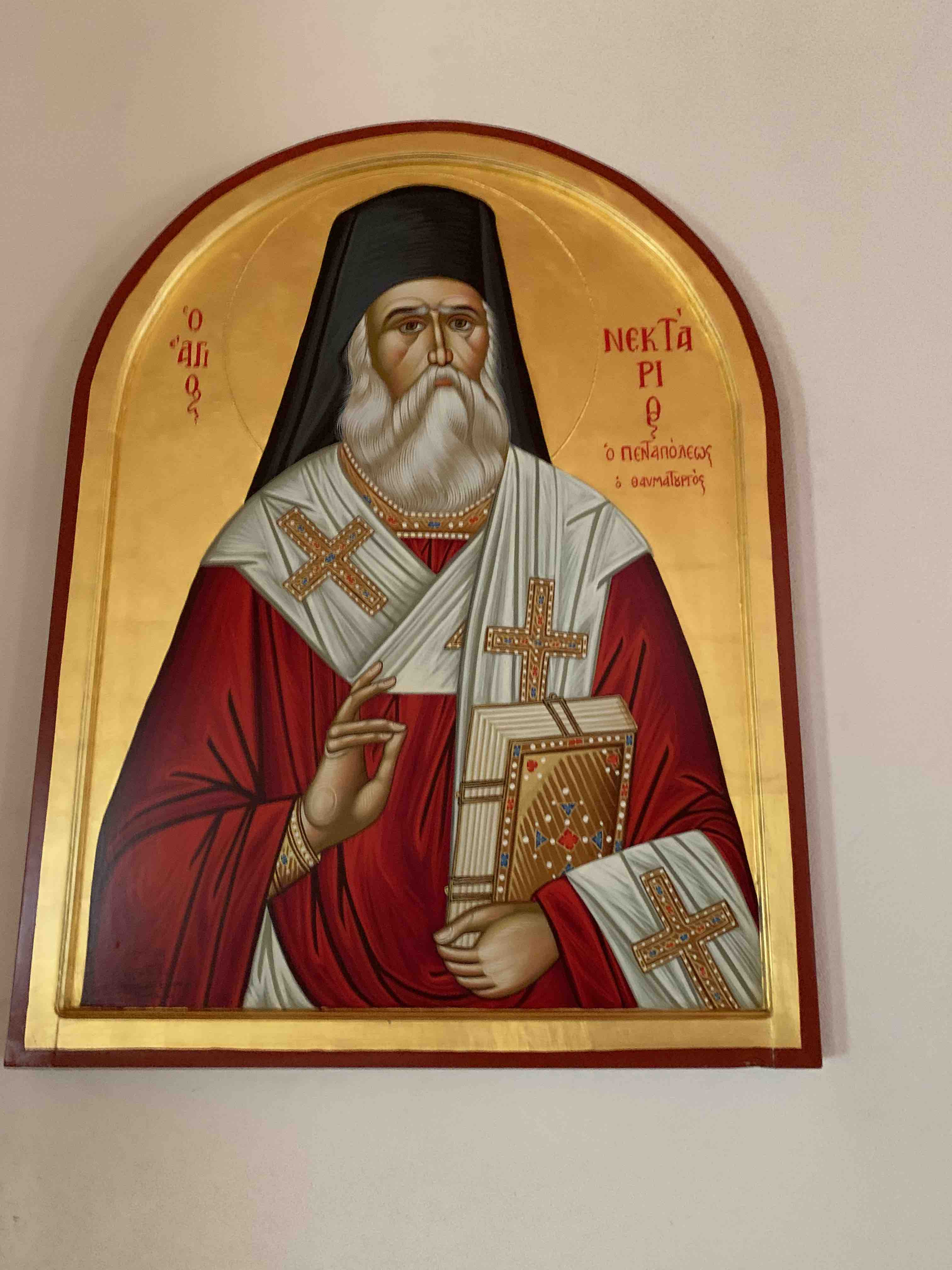
Icon of Saint Nectarios

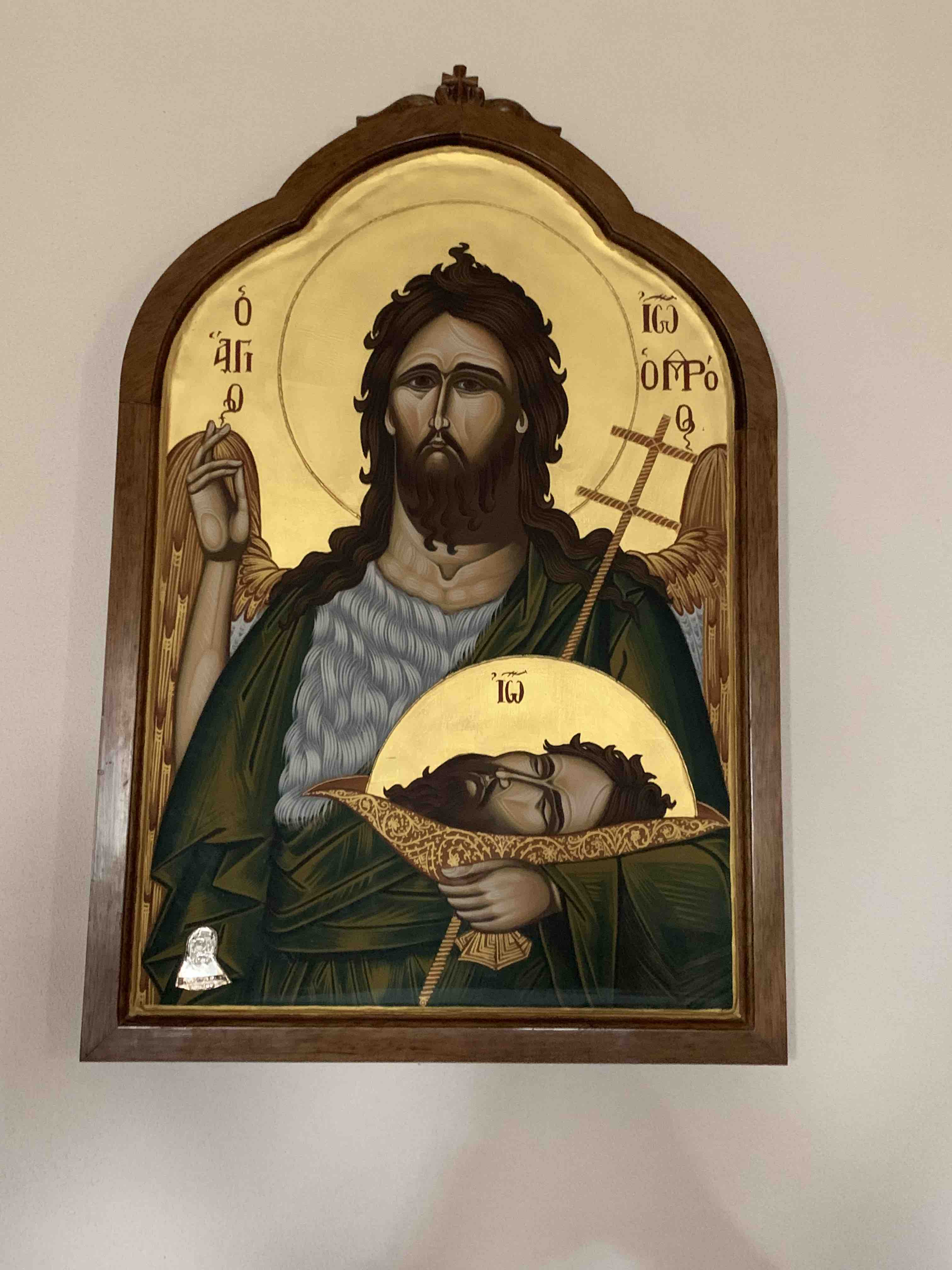
Icon of Saint John the Baptist

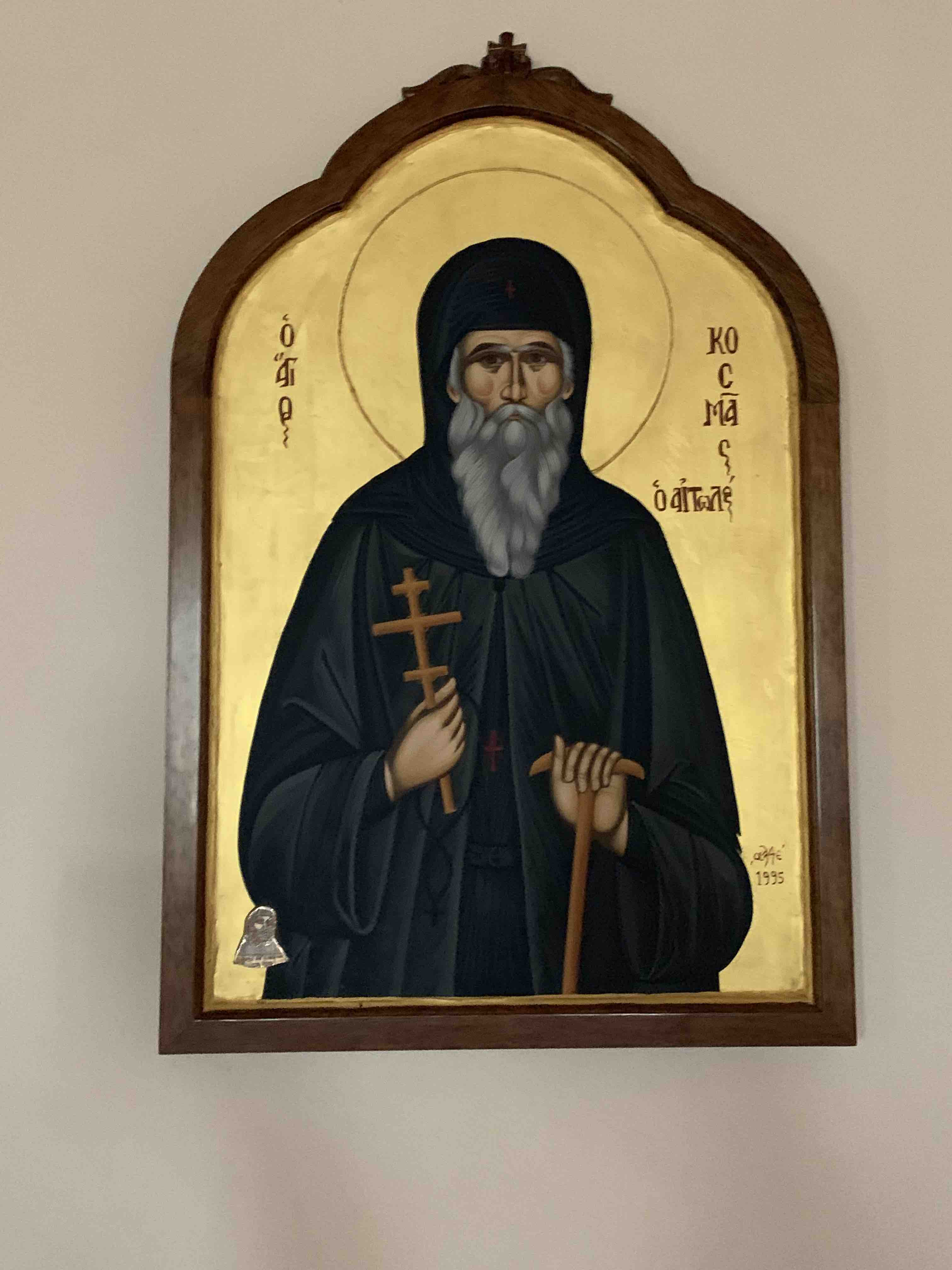
Icon of Saint Cosmas

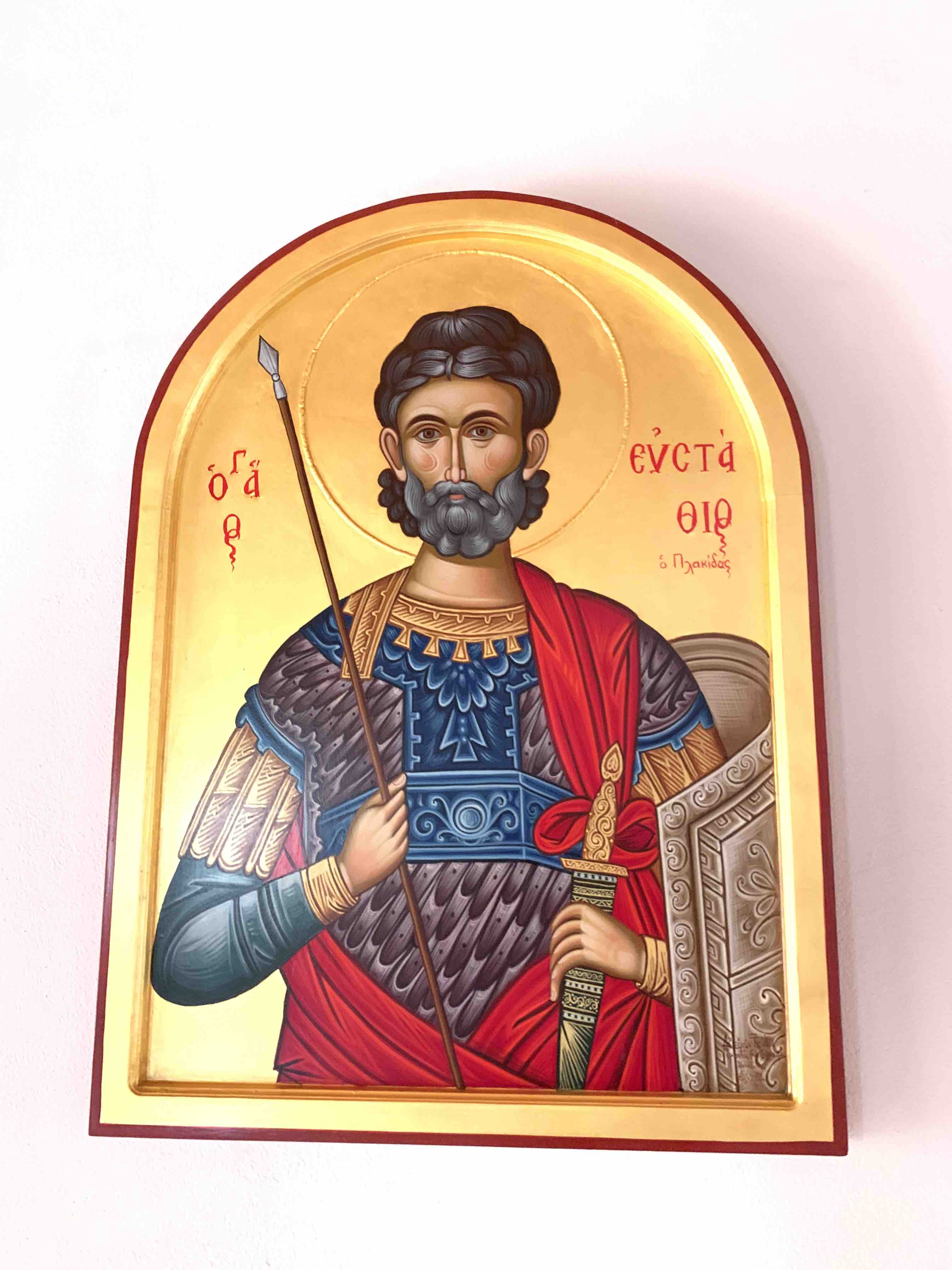
Icon of Saint Eustace

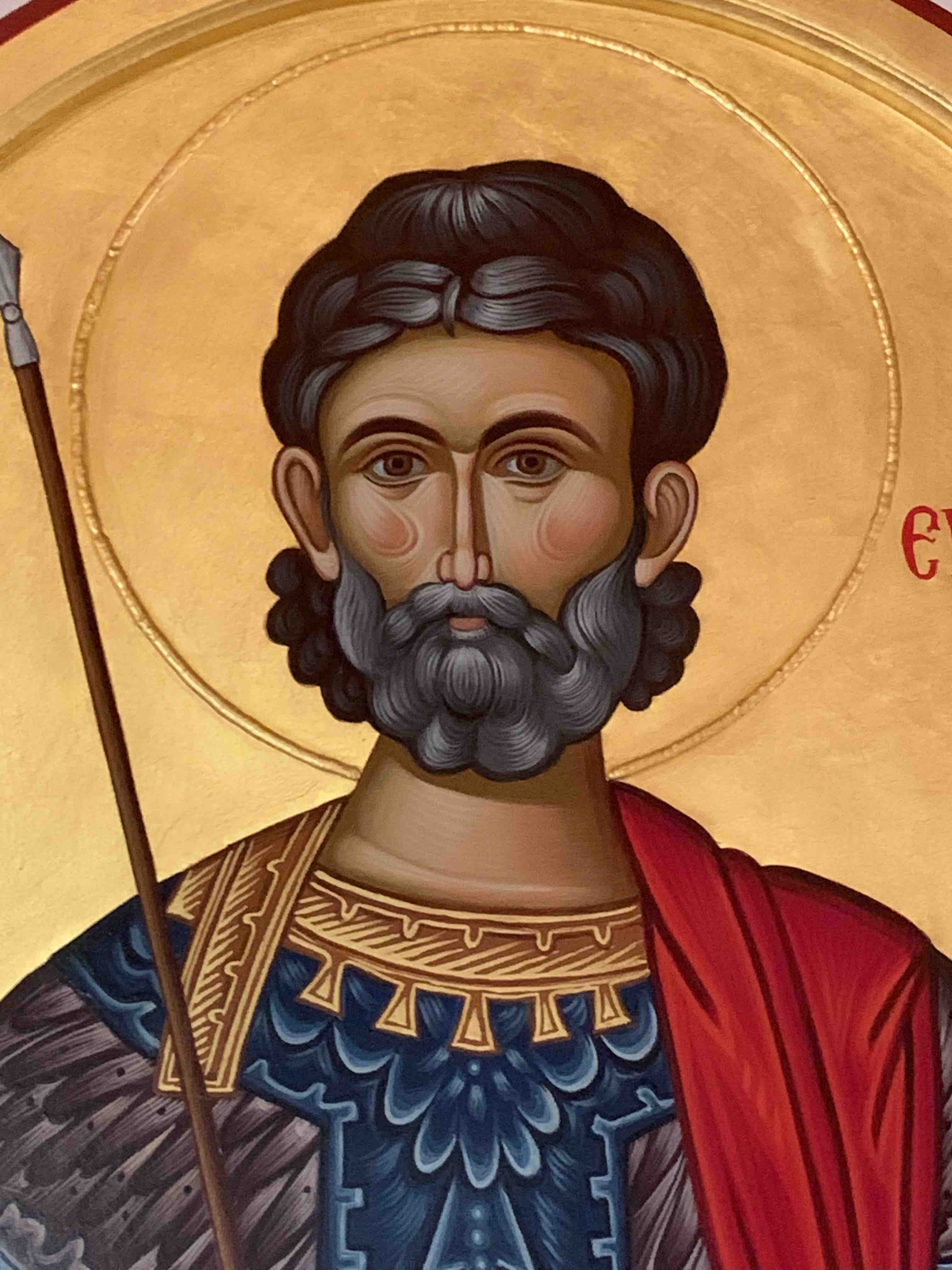
Detail of Icon of Saint Eustace

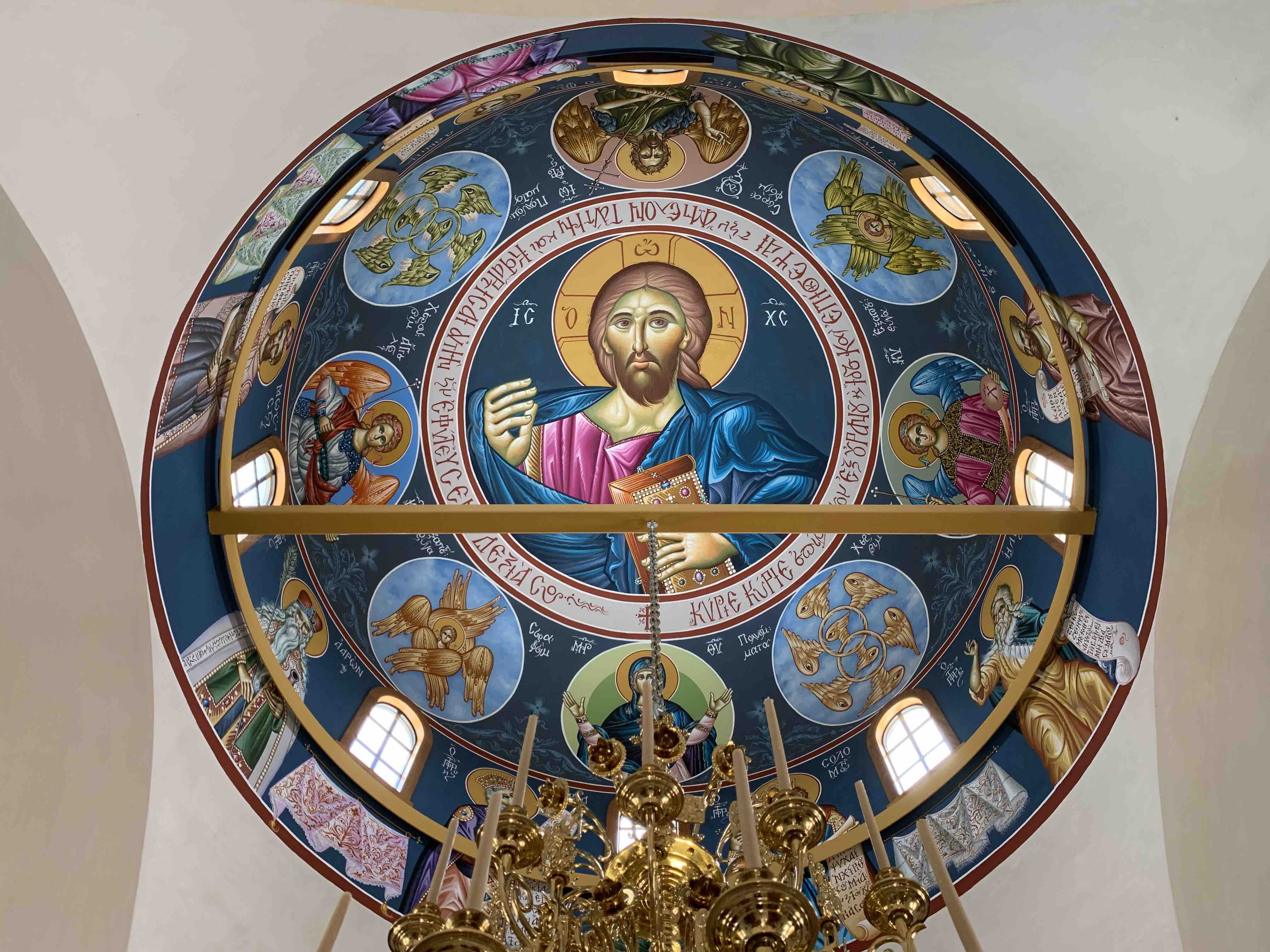
Roof fresco of Christ Pantocrator inside the dome
