= Provata =

Provata Προβάτα
- Settlement
- Location within Greece
- Coordinates: 40.2100127908°N 24.3204918950°E
- Country: Greece
- Administrative region: Mount Athos
- Elevation: 234 m (768 ft)
- Time zone: UTC+2 (EET)
  - Summer (DST): UTC+3 (EEST)

Provata (Greek: Προβάτα) is an area of Mount Athos that belongs to the Monastery of Great Lavra. It is close to the Monastery of Karakallou. This is where many people place the Skete of Glossia, which flourished in the 14th century. Gregory Palamas lived in this skete in the 14th century.

At the beginning of the century there were 17 cells inhabited by about 100 monks. The oldest of the surviving cells is that of St. George, with frescoes dating from 1635.
