= James Samuel Gordon =

American author and psychiatrist

James Samuel Gordon M.D.
- Gordon in 2026 with his book
- Citizenship: United States
- Education: Harvard University
- Occupations: Psychiatrist, writer
- Employers: National Institute of Mental Health; Georgetown University School of Medicine
- Organization: The Center for Mind-Body Medicine
- Website: jamesgordonmd.com

James Samuel Gordon is an American author and psychiatrist known for mind-body medicine. In 1991, he founded and is the director of The Center for Mind-Body Medicine (CMBM), a 501(c)(3) nonprofit educational organization. At the Georgetown Medical School and Georgetown University, he is the director of mind-body studies and clinical professor in the departments of psychiatry and family medicine.

== Education ==
His father was a surgeon and his grandfather was a pediatrician, First Chief of Pediatrics at Beth Israel Hospital in New York. He attended both college and medical school at Harvard University. As an undergraduate, he studied for and received an A.B. in English, and went on to Harvard Medical School to receive an M.D. degree. After medical school, he became a volunteer physician at the Haight-Ashbury Free Medical Clinic during the 1960s. He also attended Woodstock as a volunteer physician.

== Career ==
During the 1970s he worked as a research psychiatrist at the National Institute of Mental Health (NIMH) as well as on many NIMH projects through 1997. He also became a lecturer at various colleges. While at NIMH, he developed the first national program for runaway and homeless youth, edited the first comprehensive studies of alternative and holistic medicine, directed the Special Study on Alternative Services for President Carter’s Commission on Mental Health, and created a nationwide preceptorship program for medical students. He has been Georgetown Medical School’s director of the program of mind-body studies and clinical professor in the departments of psychiatry and family medicine since 1980.

In 2008, CMBM won a research award from the U.S. Department of Defense to study the mind-body approach with veterans returning from Iraq and Afghanistan and their families. Gordon also was appointed to chair the White House Commission on Complementary and Alternative Medicine Policy (WHCCAMP) from 2000 to 2002 by President Clinton.

During September 2019, Gordon published a new book entitled, The Transformation: Discovering Wholeness and Healing After Trauma. The book is on his recommendations to heal depression, anxiety, and psychological trauma for those who are confronted by tragedy and trauma and reviews his work with traumatized children and families in Bosnia, Gaza, Haiti, post-9/11 New York, and Parkland, as well as, veterans, active-duty military, and others.

== “Unstuck” approach ==
In his seven-stage program outlined in Unstuck: Your Guide to the Seven-Stage Journey Out of Depression, which he describes as "adapted from mythologist Joseph Campbell's groundbreaking studies of the world's mythic heroes and heroines", Gordon explains the useful, mood-healing benefits of food and nutritional supplements; movement, exercise, and dance as well as that of psychotherapy, meditation, guided imagery, spiritual practice, and prayer. He concludes each chapter with a "Prescription for Self-Care," guidelines to help each person play an active, effective role in their own healing. He includes examples from the patients he has worked with over the years.

== Personal life ==
Gordon is Jewish.
