= James C. Fernald =

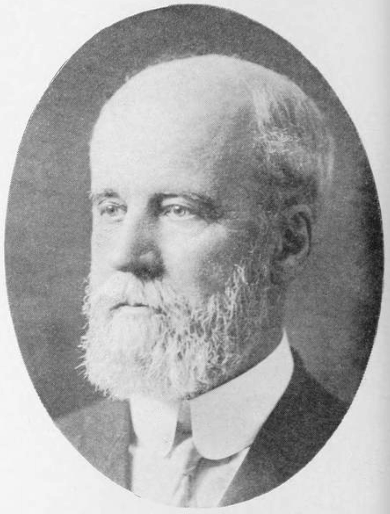
- Born: James Champlin Fernald; August 18, 1838; Portland, Maine, US
- Died: November 11, 1918 (aged 80); Montclair, New Jersey, US
- Education: Harvard University; Newton Theological Institution
- Occupations: Clergyman, writer
- Spouse: Nettie Barker (m. 1872)
- Children: 6

James Champlin Fernald (August 18, 1838 – November 11, 1918) was an American clergyman and author, who became an authority on the English language.

== Early life, education, and career ==
Born in Portland, Maine, Fernald graduated from Harvard University in 1860, where he won the Bowdoin Prize, and from Newton Theological Institution in 1863. Ill health prevented him from engaging in active military service in the American Civil War, but became one of the leaders in the battle-field work of the Massachusetts Relief Association, which rendered service much like that of the Red Cross. His most notable work was at the Battle of Gettysburg. In 1864 he was ordained to the Baptist ministry, and in the next 27 years held pastorates at Rutland, Vermont, Waterville, Maine, and Granville, McConnellsville, Clyde, Galion, Springfield, and Garrettsville, Ohio.

Going abroad to study, Fernald remained in Europe in 1866 and 1867, and from 1869 to 1872 he was in the government service. In 1889 he became a member of the staff of Funk & Wagnalls, and from 1905 to 1909 was dean of the staff of the Intercontinental Correspondence University, in Washington, D.C.

== Writing ==
In the preparation of The Standard Dictionary, Fernald was editor of synonyms, antonyms, and prepositions, and he was editor-in-chief of the Students' Standard Dictionary and other abridgments. He was editor also of The Classic Speller, Scientific Side-Lights and, for a time, of The Homiletic Review. He was an associate editor of the Columbian Cyclopedia, and editor of the revision of the Concise Standard Dictionary, in 1913; the Comprehensive Dictionary, in 1914, and the High School Standard Dictionary, in 1915.

His last work, Expressive English, was published weeks before his death. A review stated:

"Expressive English" is the apt title of a volume on the language by Dr. James C. Fernald. When it is said that the author is the editor of the Students' Standard Dictionary, it will be understood at once that he is an authority upon his subject. Indeed, he is one of the leading authorities on English in this country and has written many books and essays upon the subject. It might be supposed that a volume of this character would have a text-book dryness, but it can be said it the outset that it is interestingly written, and is sure to hold the attention of lovers of the language.

He was also known for his support of Prohibition in the United States, and his book to this end, The Economics of Prohibition, was described as "well-known" and "virtually the text book of the anti-liquor movement".

Other writings by Fernald included:

=== English language and grammar ===
- Synonyms, Antonyms, and Prepositions of the English Language
- Connectives of English Speech
- A Working Grammar of the English Language
- English Grammar Simplified

=== Other subjects ===
- The Economics of Prohibition
- The New Womanhood
- The Spaniard in History
- The Imperial Republic
- Home Training of Children
- True Motherhood

== Personal life ==
In 1872, Fernald married Nettie Barker in Ohio, with whom he had four sons and two daughters who lived to adulthood.

He died after a long illness at his home in Montclair, New Jersey, at the age of 80.
