= August 3 (Eastern Orthodox liturgics) =

Day in the Eastern Orthodox liturgical calendar

Eastern Orthodox liturgical calendar
August 2	August 3	August 4
August 3 O.S. ≍ August 16 N.S. August 3 N.S ≍ July 21 O.S.

An Eastern Orthodox cross

August 3 in Eastern Orthodox liturgical calendars is a feast day and a day of commemoration of saints and martyrs. Although some Orthodox churches use the Revised Julian Calendar and others use the traditional Julian calendar, the fixed commemorations for their respective August 3 are broadly the same, no matter which calendar is used. (Note: Despite the dates being the same, the days to which they refer typically differ by 13 days. The notation Old Style or O.S. is sometimes used to indicate a date in the traditional Julian Calendar (the "Old Calendar"). The notation New Style or N.S. indicates a date in the Revised Julian calendar (the "New Calendar").)

== Saints ==
- Holy Myrrh-bearer Salome (1st century) (Note: She was the mother of the Apostles James and John, the wife of Zebedee, and the daughter of Joseph the Betrothed, who was a widower when he became betrothed to the Mother of God. She was a disciple of the Lord and one of the Myrrh-bearing women who first brought tidings of the Resurrection to the world. Name days celebrated today include: Salome (Σαλώμη).)
- Hieromartyr Stephen, Pope of Rome, and Companions (257) (Note: He is commemorated in certain Synaxaria on September 7 as well.) (see also: August 2)
- Venerable Saints Isaac (383), Dalmatius, and Faustus (5th century), ascetics of the Dalmatian Monastery at Constantinople.
- Protomartyr Rajden (Razhdenes) of Tsromi and Nikozi, Georgia (457)
- Saint Cosmas of Palestine, eunuch and hermit (6th century)
- Martyr Olympios the Prefect (Olympius the Eparch), Byzantine noble martyred under the Persian King Chosroes II for confessing the Orthodox Faith (c. 610-641)
- Saint John of Patalaria Monastery, Confessor and Abbot (8th-9th centuries)
- Venerable Theoclite the Wonderworker, of Optimaton (Theme of the Optimatoi) (ca. 842) (Note: In Codex 73 of the Monastery of Our Lady of Halki, there is also a saint called Theokliti, whose memory is commemorated on August 21.)
- Saints John the Monastic, and John the New, Bishops of Ephesus. (Note: Their memory is preserved in two codices, the Patmiako Codex 266, and the Parisian Codex 152. In the Parisian Codex they are also commemorated on August 4.)
- Venerable Nuns Theodora, and Theopisti her daughter, of Aegina, in Thessaloniki (892) (Note: Their memory was celebrated on August 29, but was moved to August 3, dueto the feast of the Beheading of the Glorious Prophet, Forerunner, and Baptist John.)

== Pre-Schism Western saints ==
- Saint Aspren (Aspronas), Bishop of Naples (1st century) (Note: "At Naples, in Campania, St. Aspren, bishop, who was cured of a sickness by the apostle St. Peter, and after being baptized, was made bishop of that city.")
- Saint Euphronius, Bishop of Autun in France and a friend of St Lupus of Troyes, Confessor (c. 475)
- Saint Trea, hermitess, converted to Orthodoxy by St Patrick, she spent the rest of her life as an anchoress in Ardtree, now in County Londonderry, Northern Ireland (5th century)
- Saint Faustus, son of St Dalmatius of Pavia in Italy, lived the life of a holy monk (5th century)
- Saint Senach (Snach), a disciple of St Finian and his successor as Abbot of Clonard in Ireland (6th century)
- Saint Benno, hermit on Mt Etzel in Switzerland, a founder of the monastery of Einsiedeln, became Bishop of Metz in 927 (940) (Note: Born in Swabia in Germany, he became a hermit on Mt Etzel in Switzerland, St Meinrad's former hermitage. He lived there with a few disciples, so founding the monastery of Einsiedeln. In 927 he became Bishop of Metz in France. Striving to overcome abuses, he was attacked and blinded by enemies of Christ. He resigned and returned to Einsiedeln.)
- Saint Gregory of Nonantula, Abbot of Nonantola Abbey near Modena in Italy (933)

== Post-Schism Orthodox saints ==
- Venerable Anthony the Roman, Abbot in Novgorod (1147)
- Nine Kherkheulidze brothers, their mother and sister, and 9,000 others, who suffered on the field of Marabda, Georgia (1625)
- Venerable Iraclie (Flocea) of Bessarabia, Protosyncellus, exarch of the monasteries of the Archdiocese of Chișinău (1964) (Note: See: (in Romanian) Iraclie Flocea. Wikipedia. (Romanian Wikipedia).)

=== New martyrs and confessors ===
- New Hieromartyr Viacheslav Lukanin, Deacon (1918)
- New Hieromartyr Nicholas Pomerantsev, Priest (1938)

== Other commemorations ==
- Repose of Hiero-schemamonk Ignatius of Harbin (1958)

== Icon gallery ==
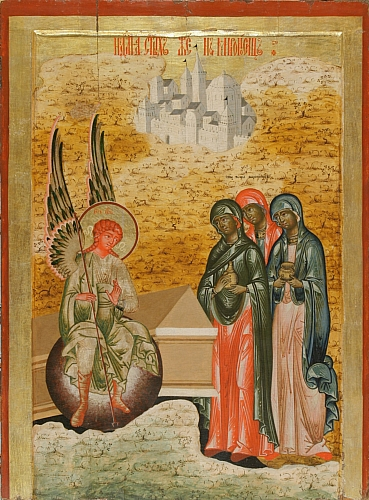
Icon of the two Marys and Salome at the Tomb of Jesus.

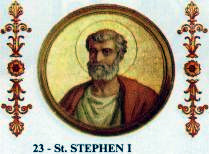
Hieromartyr Stephen, Pope of Rome.

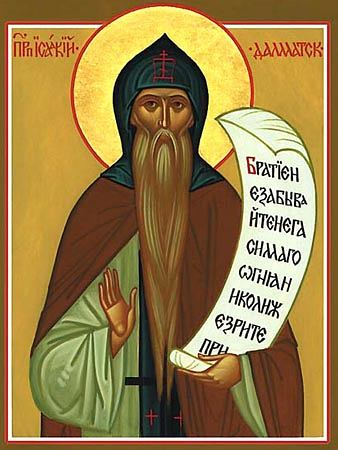
St. Isaac of Dalmatia.

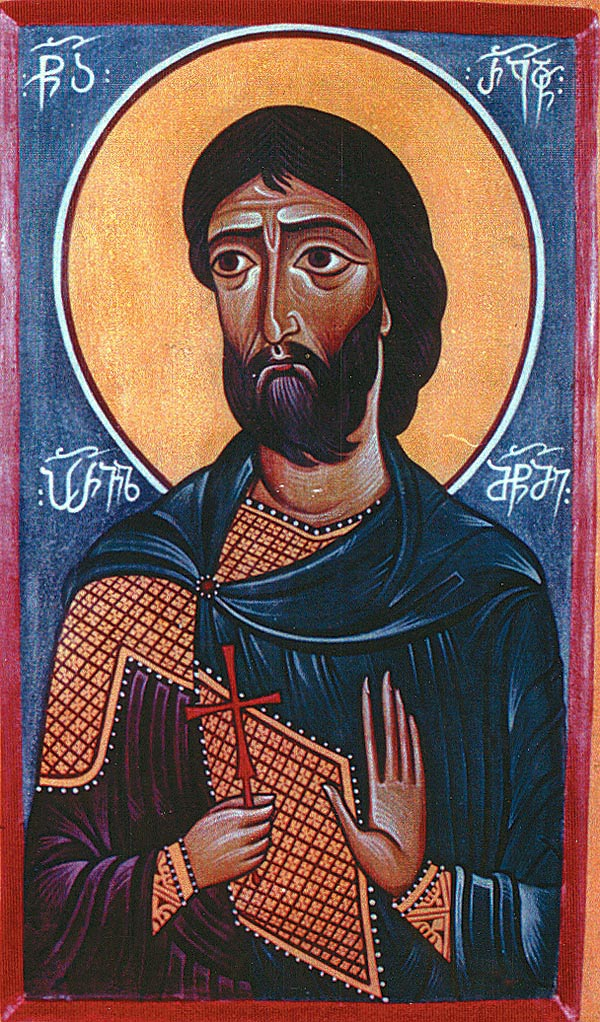
St. Razhden the Protomartyr.

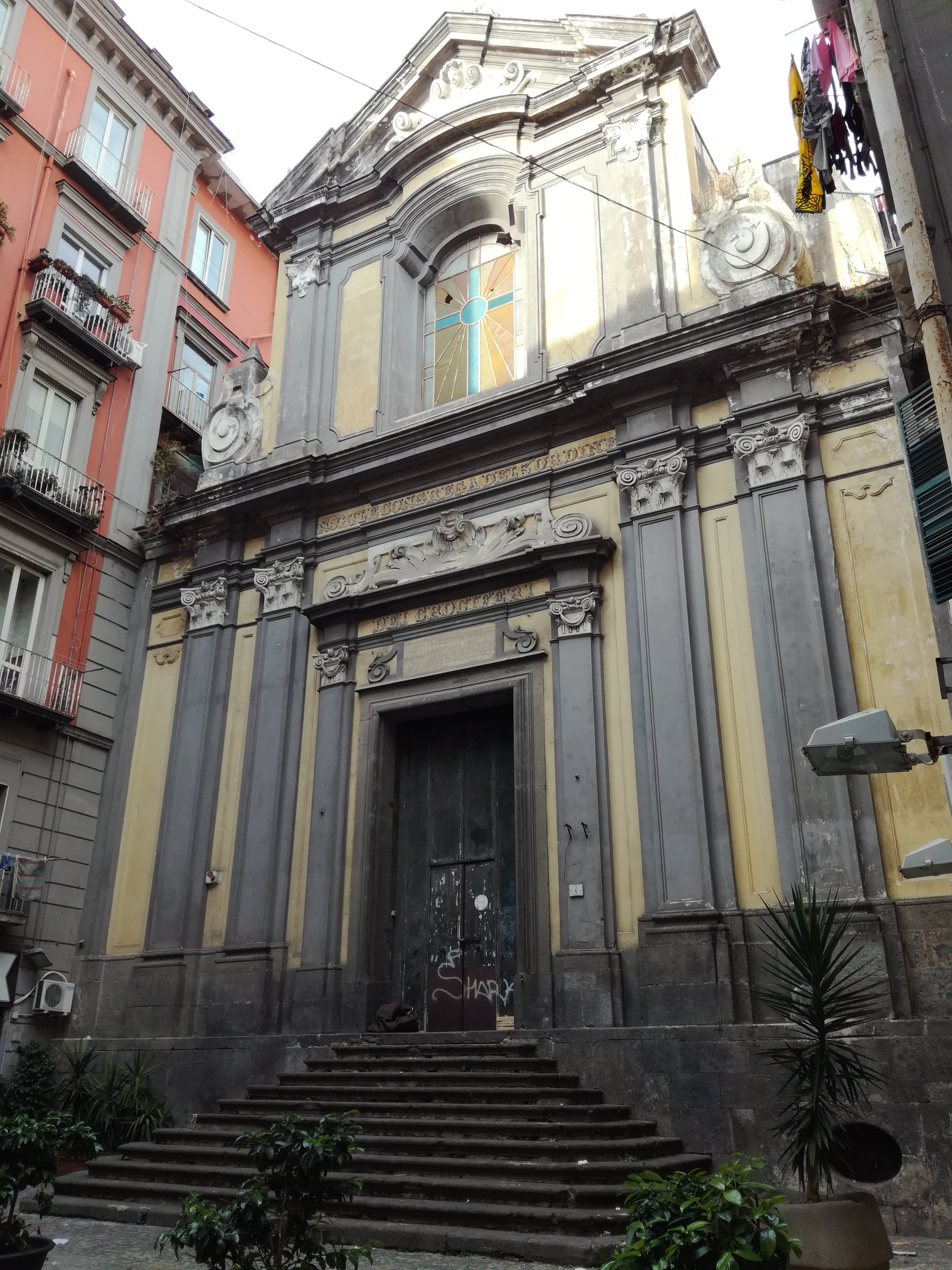
Church of Sant'Aspreno ai Crociferi, Naples, dedicated to Saint Aspren.

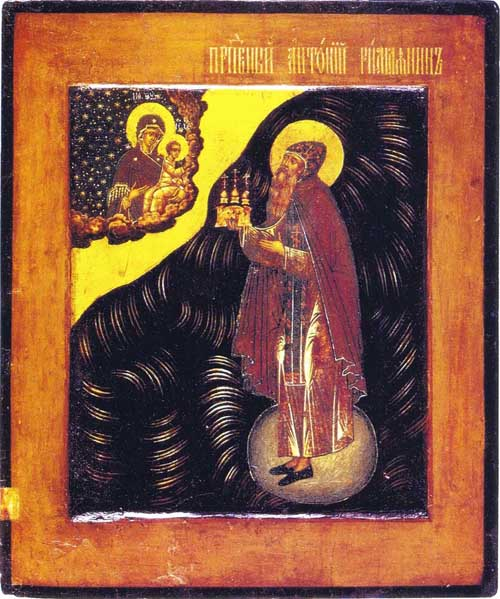
Venerable Anthony the Roman.

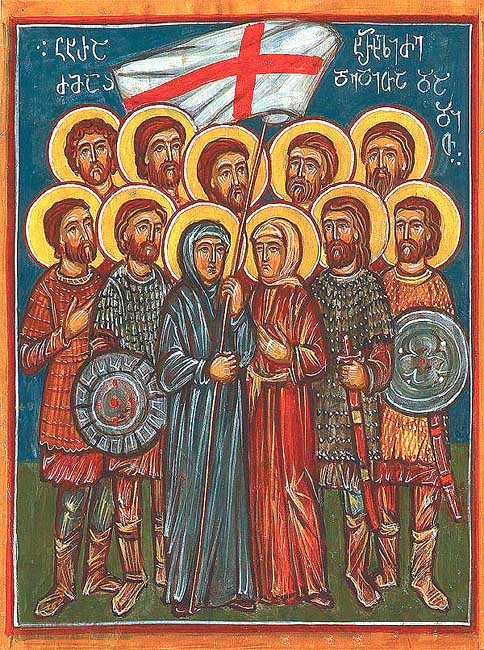
Icon of Nine Brothers Kherkheulidze with their Mother and Sister.

== Sources ==
- August 3 / August 16. Orthodox Calendar (PRAVOSLAVIE.RU).
- August 16 / August 3. HOLY TRINITY RUSSIAN ORTHODOX CHURCH (A parish of the Patriarchate of Moscow).
- August 3. OCA - The Lives of the Saints.
- The Autonomous Orthodox Metropolia of Western Europe and the Americas (ROCOR). St. Hilarion Calendar of Saints for the year of our Lord 2004. St. Hilarion Press (Austin, TX). p. 57.
- Menologion: The Third Day of the Month of August. Orthodoxy in China.
- August 3. Latin Saints of the Orthodox Patriarchate of Rome.
- The Roman Martyrology. Transl. by the Archbishop of Baltimore. Last Edition, According to the Copy Printed at Rome in 1914. Revised Edition, with the Imprimatur of His Eminence Cardinal Gibbons. Baltimore: John Murphy Company, 1916. pp. 230-231.
- Rev. Richard Stanton. A Menology of England and Wales, or, Brief Memorials of the Ancient British and English Saints Arranged According to the Calendar, Together with the Martyrs of the 16th and 17th Centuries. London: Burns & Oates, 1892. pp. 378-379.

Greek Sources

- Great Synaxaristes: (in Greek) 3 ΑΥΓΟΥΣΤΟΥ. ΜΕΓΑΣ ΣΥΝΑΞΑΡΙΣΤΗΣ.
- (in Greek) Συναξαριστής. 3 Αυγούστου. ECCLESIA.GR. (H ΕΚΚΛΗΣΙΑ ΤΗΣ ΕΛΛΑΔΟΣ).

Russian Sources

- (in Russian) 16 августа (3 августа). Православная Энциклопедия под редакцией Патриарха Московского и всея Руси Кирилла (электронная версия). (Orthodox Encyclopedia - Pravenc.ru).
