= Michael Synkellos =

Michael Synkellos (Greek: Μιχαήλ o σύγκελλος), also spelled Syncellus (c. 760 – 4 January 846), was a Greek Orthodox Arab Christian priest, monk and saint. He held the administrative office of synkellos of the patriarchate of Jerusalem (c. 811–815) and the patriarchate of Constantinople (843–846). He was involved in disputes over the filioque clause and over Byzantine iconoclasm, which landed him in prison for the period 815–843. He nevertheless wrote extensively, producing grammar, theology, hagiographies, hymns and poetry. He wrote in Greek and made at least one translation from Arabic.

== Life ==
Michael was born in Jerusalem in or about 761. He was of Arab origin. He was the only son of his parents and had several older sisters. His mother dedicated him at the age of three to the Church of the Holy Sepulchre, where he was given the rank of anagnostes (reader). Around 786, when he was twenty-five, his father died, his mother and sisters entered a convent and he entered the lavra of Mar Saba as a monk. In 797 or 798, he was ordained a priest by the patriarch of Jerusalem. After two years in Jerusalem, he returned to Mar Saba. In 800, he accepted the brothers Theodore and Theophanes as his monastic disciples.

Start of Michael's treatise on syntax, written at Edessa in the early 810s. From a 15th-century manuscript.

The period following the death of the Abbasid caliph Hārūn al-Rashīd (809) until the accession of al-Maʾmūn (813) was one of unrest that greatly affected the churches of Palestine. Between 808 and 812, probably about 811, Michael was named synkellos of the patriarch of Jerusalem. With his two disciples, he moved into the monastery of the Spoudaioi near the Holy Sepulchre. Between about 811 and 813, he visited Edessa, where he wrote his treatise on syntax. In 812 or 813, Patriarch Thomas I of Jerusalem sent Michael on a mission to Constantinople and Rome, accompanied by his disciples Theodore, Theophanes and Job. The purpose of Michael's mission was to bring letters from Thomas to Pope Leo III referring to him the controversy over the filioque that had erupted in Jerusalem in 809 and to request financial assistance in the West for the churches in Palestine following the imposition of fines by the Islamic authorities.

Michael and his disciples arrived in Constantinople during the reign of Michael I, that is, before July 813. For reasons unknown, they remained in Constantinople for some time and never got to Rome. They stayed at the Chora monastery and became involved in disputes over the re-introduction of iconoclasm by the Emperor Leo V in 815. The four were arrested, beaten, imprisoned in Phiale and offered money to recant their iconodulism. While Theodore and Theophanes were sent away, Michael and Job remained in Phiale. Following the accession of Michael II in 820, the two were exiled to the monastery of Prousias (or Prousa) near Mount Olympus. In 834, the Emperor Theophilos had them placed in solitary confinement in the Praitorion in Constantinople. In 836, Michael was moved to a new cell, where he was attended by the nun Euphrosyne.

In 843, Michael was released by the Emperor Michael III, who repudiated iconoclasm. He was elected patriarch of Constantinople, but refused the honour. He was instead appointed synkellos of the patriarchate and hegoumenos (abbot) of the Chora. He set about restoring the monastery with patriarchal and imperial assistance, dying there on 4 January 846. He was immediately regarded as a saint and an anonymous contemporary wrote a hagiography of him. He is commemorated on December 18. Nikephoros Gregoras later also wrote a biography.

== Writings ==
The identification of the writings of Michael Synkellos is complicated by the existence of three or four 9th-century writers named Michael who were identified by their office of synkellos. Michael Synkellos is sometimes, but not always, identified as "of Jerusalem" or "of Constantinople". There was even another Michael who was synkellos of Constantinople. Those extant works which are surely attributed to him include:

1. Μέθοδος περὶ τῆς τοῦ λόγου συντάξεως (Methodos peri tēs tou logou syntaxeos), the earliest surviving medieval treatise on Greek syntax, written between 810 and 813. It draws on the works of earlier writers, including Apollonius Dyscolus, Herodian, and the Τέχνη γραμματική (Technike grammatike) traditionally attributed to Dionysius Thrax, and covers all of the parts of speech, but says little about morphology. It became very popular in the 13th century and exists in around 100 manuscripts.
2. An encomium on Dionysius the Areopagite, written during his confinement in Prousias (820–834).
3. A translation into Greek of an Arabic profession of the Chalcedonian faith by the Sabaite monk Theodore Abu Qurrah addressed to the Armenians around 813.
4. Λίβελλος περὶ τῆς ὀρθοδόξου πίστεως (Libellos peri tes orthodoxou pisteos), a short book on orthodoxy.
5. An anacreontic poem on the restoration of icons.
6. Four canons (hymns).

Extant works the attribution of which to him is disputed include:

1. A letter addressed to Theodore and Theophanes. It is incorporated into his anonymous biography, but its authenticity is disputed. It was written in 836 after the two were brought back to Constantinople from their exile for questioning and tattooing.
2. An account of the 42 martyrs of Amorion. According to a manuscript of 1023, it was read out on 7 March 843, 844 or 845, which would make it one of Michael's last works.
3. An encomium on Zechariah, father of John the Baptist; two encomia on the angels; one on the archangels Gabriel and Michael; one on Saint Mocius; and one on Saints Isaac and Dalmatius.
4. An account of the life and miracles of John of Damascus and Cosmas of Maiuma and another biography of John of Damascus.
5. Two orations or homilies, one on the dead and one on the Holy Girdle.
6. A polemical refutation of Islam with an account of its origins. This is found in the passage 697.12–702.9 of the Chronicon syntomon of George Hamartolos, who refers to Michael's summary (epitome) on the topic. This may indicate that George was using an epitome made by Michael either of a work of his own or a work by another.

Several lost writings by Michael are known from his biography:

1. His correspondence with the Greek monks of Byzantine Sicily concerning the filioque.
2. His correspondence with other iconodules during his confinement in Prousias.
3. His correspondence during solitary confinement with the iconodules Stephen the asekretis and Kallonas the spatharios.

== Bibliography ==
- Browning, Robert; Kazhdan, Alexander (1991). "Michael Synkellos". In Kazhdan, Alexander (ed.). The Oxford Dictionary of Byzantium. Vol. 2. Oxford and New York: Oxford University Press. pp. 1369–1370. ISBN 0-19-504652-8.
- Callahan, Daniel F. (1992). "The Problem of the 'Filioque' and the Letter from the Pilgrim Monks of the Mount of Olives to Pope Leo III and Charlemagne: Is the Letter another Forgery by Adémar of Chabannes?". Revue Bénédictine. 102 (1–2): 75–134. doi:10.1484/j.rb.4.01280.
- Cunningham, Mary B. (1991). The Life of Michael the Synkellos: Text, Translation and Commentary. Belfast: Belfast Byzantine Enterprises.
- Dickey, Eleanor (2007). Ancient Greek Scholarship. Oxford: Oxford University Press. ISBN 978-0-19-804266-2.
- Kolia-Dermitzaki, Athina (2008). "Michael the Synkellos". In David Thomas; Barbara Roggema (eds.). Christian–Muslim Relations: A Bibliographical History. Vol. 1 (600–900). Leiden: Brill. pp. 627–632. doi:10.1163/1877-8054_cmri_COM_23676.
- Lilie, Ralph-Johannes; Ludwig, Claudia; Pratsch, Thomas; Zielke, Beate (2013). Prosopographie der mittelbyzantinischen Zeit Online. Berlin-Brandenburgische Akademie der Wissenschaften. Nach Vorarbeiten F. Winkelmanns erstellt (in German). Berlin and Boston: De Gruyter.
- Martindale, John R., ed. (2014) [2001]. Prosopography of the Byzantine Empire. Vol. 1. King's College London.
- Ottewill-Soulsby, Samuel (2019). "ʿAbbāsid–Carolingian Diplomacy in Early Medieval Arabic Apocalypse". Millennium. 16 (1): 213–232. doi:10.1515/mill-2019-0011. S2CID 207892673.
