= August 2 (Eastern Orthodox liturgics) =

Day in the Eastern Orthodox liturgical calendar

Eastern Orthodox liturgical calendar
August 1	August 2	August 3
August 2 O.S. ≍ August 15 N.S. August 2 N.S ≍ July 20 O.S.

An Eastern Orthodox cross

August 2 in Eastern Orthodox liturgical calendars is a feast day and a day of commemoration of saints and martyrs. Although some Orthodox churches use the Revised Julian Calendar and others use the traditional Julian calendar, the fixed commemorations for their respective August 2 are broadly the same, no matter which calendar is used. (Note: Despite the dates being the same, the days to which they refer typically differ by 13 days. The notation Old Style or O.S. is sometimes used to indicate a date in the traditional Julian Calendar (the "Old Calendar"). The notation New Style or N.S. indicates a date in the Revised Julian calendar (the "New Calendar").)

== Saints ==
- Hieromartyr Stephen, Pope of Rome, and Companions (257) (Note: "At Rome, in the cemetery of Callistus, the birthday of St. Stephen, pope and martyr. In the persecution of Valerian, the soldiers suddenly entered whilst he was saying Mass, but he remained before the altar and concluded the sacred mysteries with intrepidity, and was beheaded on his throne.") (see also: August 3)
- Saint Phocas.
- Saint Friardus of Vindumitta in Gaul (c. 577) (see also: August 1 - West)

== Pre-Schism Western saints ==
- Martyr Rutilius (250) (Note: "In Africa, St. Rutilius, martyr. He had frequently secured safety from the perils of persecution by flight, and sometimes even by means of money, but at last, being unexpectedly apprehended, he was led to the governor, and subjected to many tortures. Afterwards he was cast into the fire, and thus merited the glorious crown of martyrdom.")
- Saint Maximus of Padua, successor of St Prosdocimus as Bishop of Padua in Italy, Wonderworker (2nd century)
- Saint Auspicius, the first Bishop of Apt in France (pre-4th century)
- Saint Eusebius of Vercelli, Bishop of Vercelli in Piedmont in Italy (371) (Note: Born in Sardinia, in 340, he became Bishop of Vercelli in Piedmont in Italy. He fought Arianism and was exiled to the East. Before returning to Italy he visited St Athanasius in Alexandria. He reposed in peace in Vercelli in 371, although he has been called a martyr on account of his sufferings.)
- Saint Sidwell (Sativola), a Briton from the West of England near Exeter, she was beheaded as a martyr, by a scythe (6th century)
- Saint Boetharius (Betharius, Bethaire), Bishop of Chartres in France, he was present at the Council of Sens (623)
- Saint Etheldritha (Alfreda), daughter of King Offa of Mercia, an anchoress at Crowland in Lincolnshire in England (c. 835)
- Saint Plegmund, the tutor of King Alfred and twentieth Archbishop of Canterbury (914) (Note: Born in Cheshire (his hermitage at Plemstall, Plegmundstow, was named after him). He restored the Church in England after the Danish attacks and was a notable scholar.)

== Post-Schism Orthodox saints ==
- Venerable Fotou the Cypriot (Photini the Cypriot), the Wonderworker. (Note: In the village of Agios Andronikos of Yialousa in the Karpass Peninsula, there is the cave where Saint Photini the Cypriot, who in Cyprus is known as Saint Fotou, lived an ascetic life and who is one of the most beloved saints of the region. When the residents of the village discovered the cave, they declared Saint Fotou as patron saint of the village and built a church in her honor under Archbishop Chrysanthos (1767-1810), during the 18th century.)
- Blessed Basil of Kamenny Monastery, Lake Kubenskoye, Vologda (1472)
- Saint Marco of Belavinsk, in Vologda (1492)
- Blessed Basil of Moscow, Fool-for-Christ (1552)
- New Martyr Theodore of the Dardanelles (1690)

=== New martyrs and confessors ===
- New Hieromartyr Platon (Kolegov), Hieromonk, of Chasovo (Komi) (1937)

== Other commemorations ==
- Translation of the relics (415) of the Righteous Nicodemus, Gamaliel, and Abibus, of Jerusalem (1st century) (Note: The Roman Martyrology lists this feast on August 3rd: "AT Jerusalem, the finding of the body of most blessed Stephen, first martyr, and of the Saints Gamaliel, Nicodemus, and Abibo, through a divine revelation made to the priest Lucian, in the time of the emperor Honorius.")
- Translation of the relics from Jerusalem to Constantinople (428) of Protomartyr and Archdeacon Stephen (34)
- Translation of the relics of Martyrs Dada, Maximus, and Quintilian, at Dorostolum in Moesia (286) (Note: Their feast day is on April 13 and April 28.)
- Consecration of the Church of St. John the Theologian, near the Holy Great Church in Constantinople.
- Repose of the pious Emperor Justinian II, Fool-for-Christ, interred in the Church of the Holy Apostles.
- Repose of Hieromonk Peter (Seregin), spiritual father of Pühtitsa Convent, Estonia (1982)
- Icon of the Mother of God of Achair (2002)

== Icon gallery ==
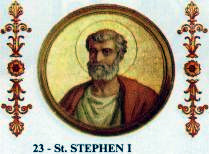
Hieromartyr Stephen, Pope of Rome.

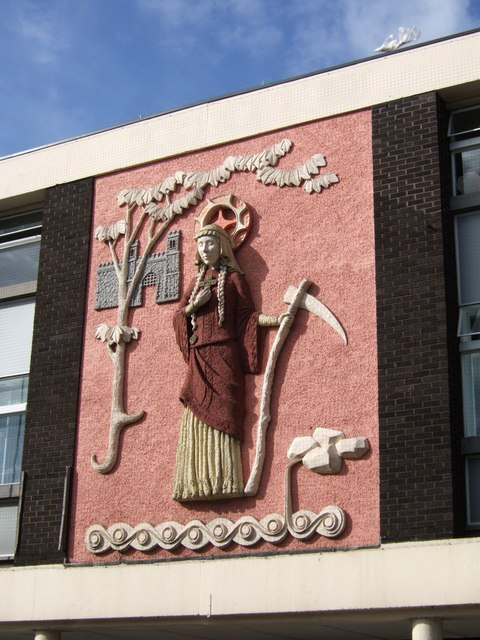
Relief of St Sidwell (Sativola) on a shopping arcade in Sidwell Street, Exeter.

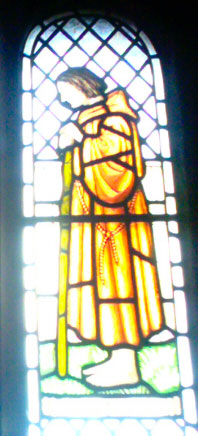
Stained glass window of Plegmund from Chester Cathedral.

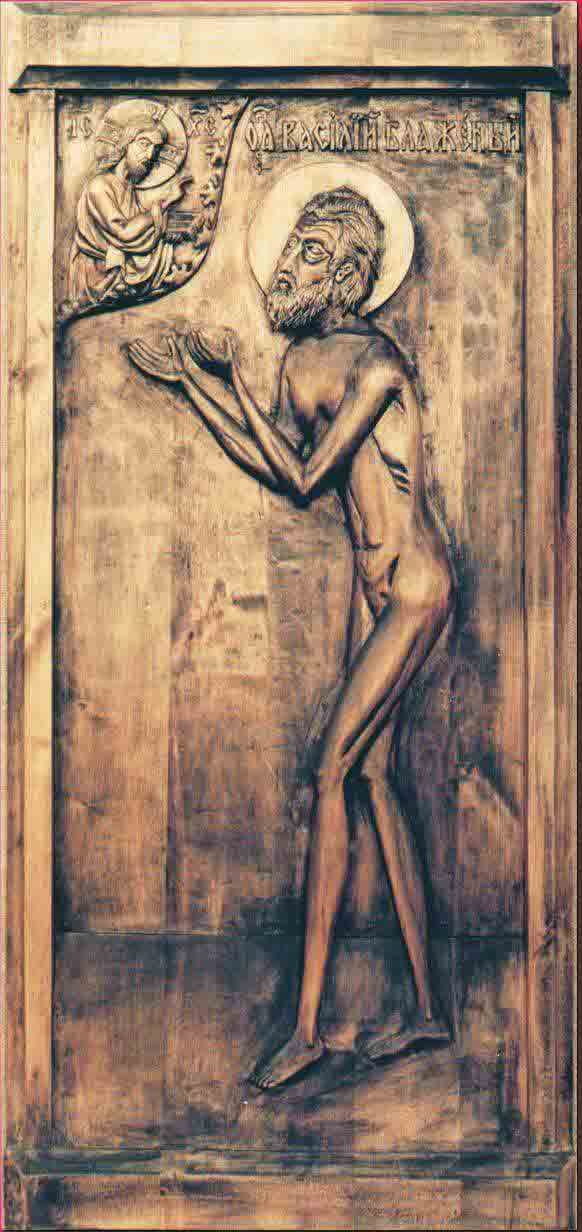
Blessed Basil of Moscow, Fool-for-Christ.

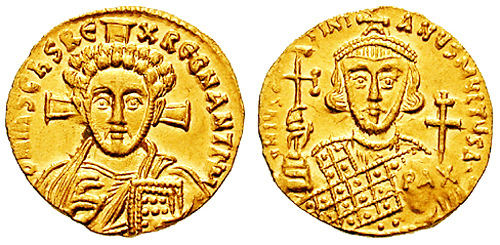
Emperor Justinian II, Fool-for-Christ, on the reverse of this coin, holding a patriarchal globe with PAX, "peace".

== Sources ==
- August 2 / August 15. Orthodox Calendar (PRAVOSLAVIE.RU).
- August 15 / August 2. HOLY TRINITY RUSSIAN ORTHODOX CHURCH (A parish of the Patriarchate of Moscow).
- August 2. OCA - The Lives of the Saints.
- The Autonomous Orthodox Metropolia of Western Europe and the Americas (ROCOR). St. Hilarion Calendar of Saints for the year of our Lord 2004. St. Hilarion Press (Austin, TX). p. 57.
- Menologion: The Second Day of the Month of August. Orthodoxy in China.
- August 2. Latin Saints of the Orthodox Patriarchate of Rome.
- The Roman Martyrology. Transl. by the Archbishop of Baltimore. Last Edition, According to the Copy Printed at Rome in 1914. Revised Edition, with the Imprimatur of His Eminence Cardinal Gibbons. Baltimore: John Murphy Company, 1916. pp. 229–230.
- Rev. Richard Stanton. A Menology of England and Wales, or, Brief Memorials of the Ancient British and English Saints Arranged According to the Calendar, Together with the Martyrs of the 16th and 17th Centuries. London: Burns & Oates, 1892. p. 378.

Greek Sources

- Great Synaxaristes: (in Greek) 2 ΑΥΓΟΥΣΤΟΥ. ΜΕΓΑΣ ΣΥΝΑΞΑΡΙΣΤΗΣ.
- (in Greek) Συναξαριστής. 2 Αυγούστου. ECCLESIA.GR. (H ΕΚΚΛΗΣΙΑ ΤΗΣ ΕΛΛΑΔΟΣ).

Russian Sources

- (in Russian) 15 августа (2 августа). Православная Энциклопедия под редакцией Патриарха Московского и всея Руси Кирилла (электронная версия). (Orthodox Encyclopedia - Pravenc.ru).
