= Paul K. Davis (historian) =

American military historian (born 1952)

Paul K. Davis (born 1952) is an American historian specializing in military history.

== Education and career ==
Born in Texas, he was educated at Southwest Texas State University before earning his PhD from King's College London with a thesis on the Mesopotamian campaign of the First World War. He has been consulted as an expert military historian by the BBC and National Public Radio. He has lectured at St. Mary's University, the Alamo Colleges system, and the University of Texas at San Antonio.

== Select bibliography ==
- 100 Decisive Battles: From Ancient Times to the Present Oxford University Press, 2001. ISBN 0-19-514366-3
- Besieged: An Encyclopedia of Great Sieges from Ancient Times to the Present. Santa Barbara, Calif: ABC-CLIO, 2001. ISBN 1-576-07195-2 OCLC 47825934
- Encyclopedia of Invasions and Conquests from Ancient Times to the Present. Millerton, N.Y.: Grey House Pub, 2006. ISBN 1-59237-114-0
- Encyclopedia of Warrior Peoples & Fighting Groups with Allen Lee Hamilton ISBN 1-59237-116-7; 3rd ed., Grey House, 2016
- Ends and Means: The British Mesopotamia Campaign and Commission, 1914–1916. Farleigh Dickinson University Press, 1994
- Masters of the Battlefield: Great Commanders from the Classical Age to the Napoleonic Era. Oxford University Press, 2013
