= August 14 (Eastern Orthodox liturgics) =

Day in the Eastern Orthodox liturgical calendar

Eastern Orthodox liturgical calendar
August 13	August 14	August 15
August 14 O.S. ≍ August 27 N.S. August 14 N.S ≍ August 1 O.S.

An Eastern Orthodox cross

August 14 in Eastern Orthodox liturgical calendars is a feast day and a day of commemoration of saints and martyrs. Although some Orthodox churches use the Revised Julian Calendar and others use the traditional Julian calendar, the fixed commemorations for their respective August 14 are broadly the same, no matter which calendar is used. (Note: Despite the dates being the same, the days to which they refer typically differ by 13 days. The notation Old Style or O.S. is sometimes used to indicate a date in the traditional Julian Calendar (the "Old Calendar"). The notation New Style or N.S. indicates a date in the Revised Julian calendar (the "New Calendar").)

== Feasts ==
- Forefeast of the Dormition of the Mother of God. (Note: The Troparion of the Forefeast invites us to gather on this day in gladness, for the Theotokos is about to depart from earth to heaven.)

== Saints ==
- Prophet Micah (8th century BC) (see also: January 5)
- Martyr Tarcisius, at Rome, under Valerian and Gallienus (c. 253–260) (see also: August 15)
- Martyr Ursicius, at Illyricum (305- 313) (Note: "In Dalmatia, St. Ursicius, a martyr, who was beheaded for Christ, after suffering various torments, under the emperor Maximian, and the governor Aristides.")
- Martyr Luke the Soldier, by fire.
- Hieromartyr Marcellus, Bishop of Apamea (389) (Note: "At Apamea, in Syria, St. Marcellus, bishop and martyr, who was killed by the exasperated Gentiles, for having pulled down a temple of Jupiter.")

== Pre-Schism Western saints ==
- Saint Eusebius of Rome, a priest in Rome who founded the 'church' called the titulis Eusebii after him (4th century) (Note: "At Rome, the birthday of the blessed priest Eusebius, who for the defense of the Catholic faith was shut up in a room of his own house by the Arian emperor Constantius, where constantly persevering in prayer for seven months, he rested in peace. His body was removed by the priests Gregory and Orosius, and buried in the cemetery of Callistus, on the Appian road.")
- Saint Fachanan, Abbot of Rosscarbery, Cork, Ireland (c. 600)
- Saint Werenfrid, born in England, he worked with St Willibrord among the Frisians in the Netherlands (c. 760) (Note: "WERENFRID was one of the numerous English men who devoted themselves to the conversion of the kindred race of the Old Saxons on the Continent. He is usually supposed to have been one of St. Willibrord's first companions, and to have sailed with him from Ireland at the bidding of St. Egbert, but his life leaves it doubtful whether he actually accompanied the great missioner, or followed him some years later. After various employments among the Frisians, Werenfrid was sent by St. Willibrord to the isle of Batavia, which had been given to him by Charles Martel, and established himself at Elst. There he built a church, and exercised a fruitful mission, until, urged by his zeal, he proceeded to Westervoost, near Arnheim, and while labouring there was seized with a fever, which he foretold would be the end of his earthly course. He gave up his soul to God with singular piety, and assisted by the religious men whom he called together. A heavenly odour pervaded the place of his death and the neighbourhood, inspiring all with sentiments of devotion and veneration for the servant of God. A dispute arose between the inhabitants of Westervoost and Elst for the honour of possessing his sacred remains, which was terminated by a miracle, through which the Saint clearly indicated that Elst was to be the place of his repose. There his relics were duly honoured, until they were profaned by the heretics in the year 1588; after which sacrilege the ashes and fragments, which could be collected, were reverently preserved by the faithful.")
- Saint Eberhard of Einsiedeln Abbey (958) (Note: Born in Swabia in Germany, he became a monk and then the first Abbot of Einsiedeln in Switzerland.)
- Saint Anastasius (Anastaz-Astrik), Archbishop of Esztergom (c. 1007) (Note: Abbot (996-1006) of Pannonhalma in Hungary and then second Archbishop of Eszterzom and primate of Hungary.)

== Post-Schism Orthodox saints ==
- New Martyr Symeon of Trebizond, at Constantinople (1653)

=== New martyrs and confessors ===
- New Hieromartyr Basil (Bogoyavlensky), (Note: See also: Василий (Богоявленский). Википедии. (Russian Wikipedia).) Archbishop of Chernigov, and with him:

- New Monkmartyr Matthew (Pomerantsev), Archimandrite, of Perm, and
- New Martyr Alexei Zverev (1918)

- New Hieromartyr Vladimir Tsedrinsky, Priest (1918)
- New Hieromartyrs Nazarius, Metropolitan of Kutaisi, Georgia, and with him:

- Priests Herman, Hierotheus, and Simon, and
- Archdeacon Bessarion (1924) (Note: "Without an investigation, the Troika (a Soviet extraordinary council of three judges) sentenced to death Metropolitan Nazarius and four other clergymen—Priest Herman Jajanidze, Priest Hierotheos Nikoladze, Priest Simon Mchedlidze, and Archdeacon Besarion Kukhianidze. They were shot to death in the Sapichkhia Forest. In 1994, with the blessing of Catholicos-Patriarch Ilia II, the full Ecclesiastical Council of the Georgian Church resolved with one accord to canonize Metropolitan Nazarius and the clergymen who were martyred with him. At the same time, the council canonized all the Orthodox Christians who, for their Faith and the independence of their homeland, became victims of the totalitarian regime. They were proclaimed the "New Martyrs of the Georgian Church."")

- Synaxis of the New Martyrs of Georgia ("New Martyrs of the Georgian Church"), who suffered under the Atheist Yoke (20th century)
- New Hieromartyrs Vladimir Smirnov and Nicholas Tolgsky, Priests (1937)
- Virgin-Martyr Eudokia, nun, and Martyr Theodore Zakharov (1937)
- New Hieromartyr Eleutherius (Pechennikov), Schema-Archimandrite, of the Holy Trinity Monastery (Smolensk) (1937)
- New Martyr Eva (Pavlova), Abbess of Holy Trinity Convent in Penza (Saratov) (1937)
- Venerable New Hiero-Confessor Alexander (Urodov), Archimandrite, of Sanaxar and Seven Lakes Monasteries (1961)

== Other commemorations ==
- Translation of the True Cross back to the Palace. (Note: On this day the True Cross was put away once again, having been set out from the end of July or the start of August for the veneration of the faithful.)
- Translation of the relics (1091) of Venerable Theodosius of the Kiev Caves, Abbot (1074)
- Translation of the relics (1798) of Venerable Arcadius, monk of Novotorzhok (1077)
- Commemoration of the disciples of Saint Tikhon of Zadonsk:

- Monks Theophanes, Aaron, Nicander, Cosmas, and Metrophanes (18th-19th centuries)

- Repose of Archimandrite Theodosius (Makkos) of Bethany (1991)

=== Icons ===
- Icon of the Mother of God "the Converser" (1383)
- Icon of the Mother of God of Narva (1558)

== Icon gallery ==
Prophet Micah.
(Menologion of Basil II, 10th century).

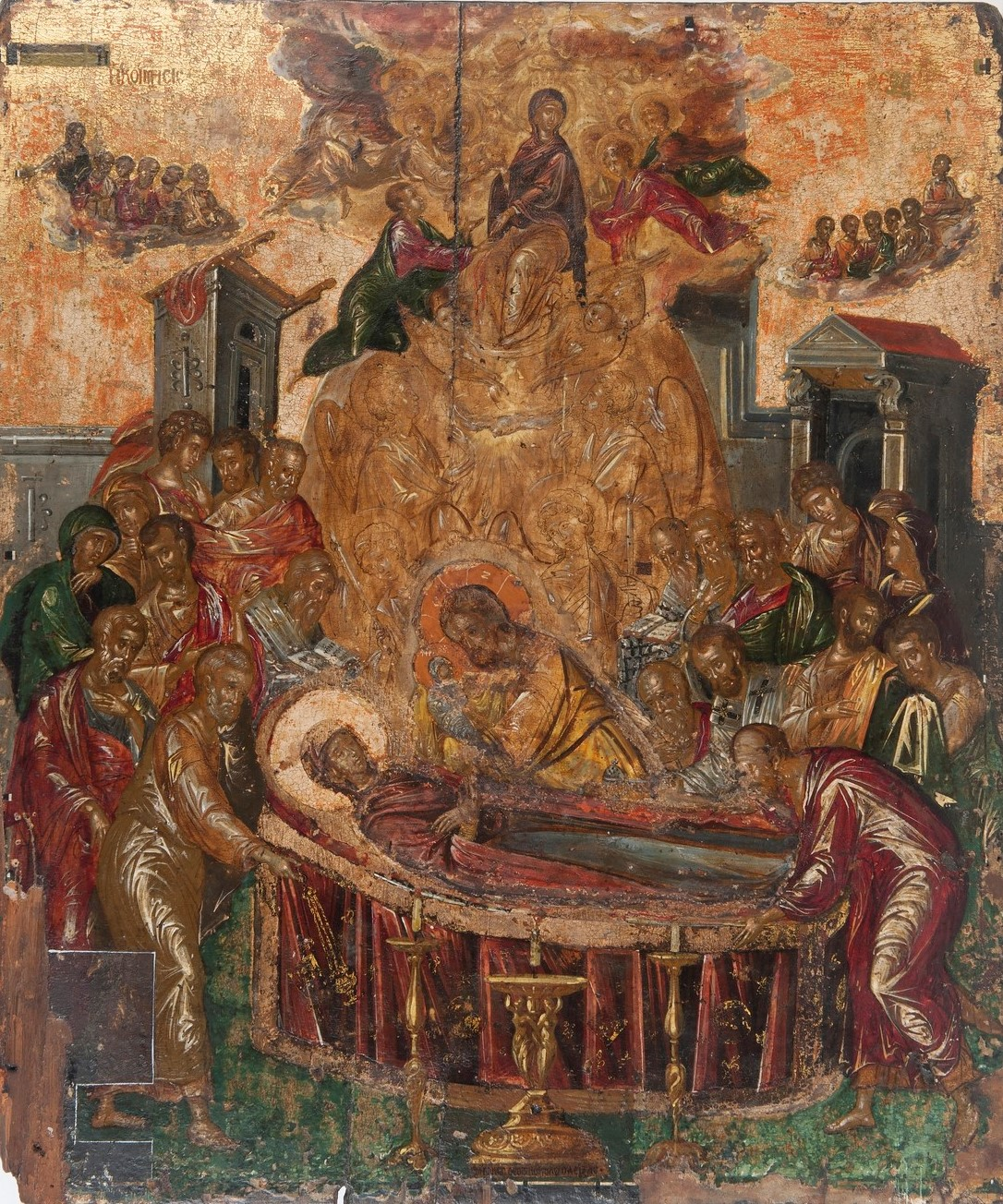
Icon of the Dormition of the Theotokos
(El Greco, 16th century).

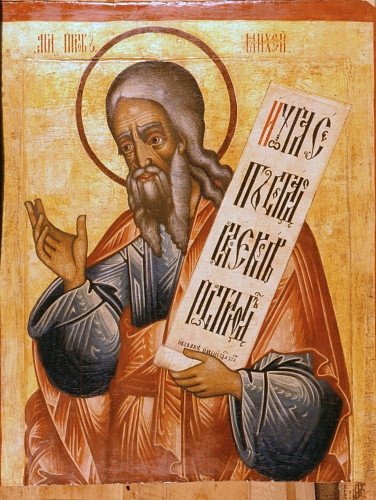
Prophet Micah.

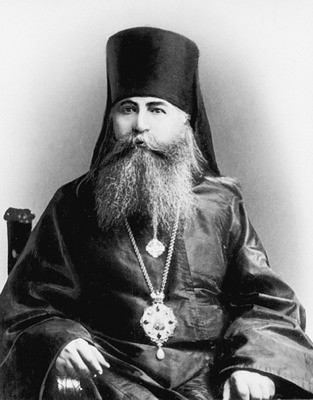
New Hieromartyr Basil (Bogoyavlensky).

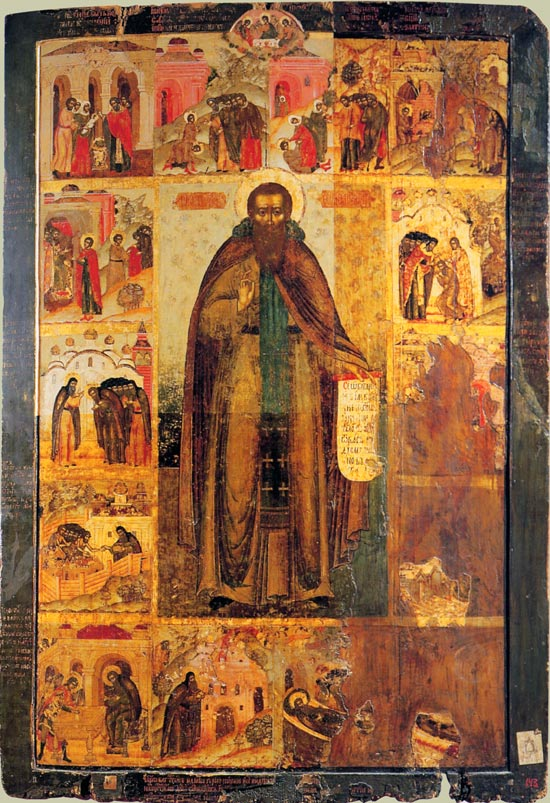
Venerable Theodosius of the Kiev Caves.

== Sources ==
- August 14 / August 27. Orthodox Calendar (PRAVOSLAVIE.RU).
- August 27 / August 14. Holy Trinity Russian Orthodox Church (A parish of the Patriarchate of Moscow).
- August 14. OCA - The Lives of the Saints.
- The Autonomous Orthodox Metropolia of Western Europe and the Americas (ROCOR). St. Hilarion Calendar of Saints for the year of our Lord 2004. St. Hilarion Press (Austin, TX). p. 60.
- Menologion: The Fourteenth Day of the Month of August. Orthodoxy in China.
- August 14. Latin Saints of the Orthodox Patriarchate of Rome.
- The Roman Martyrology. Transl. by the Archbishop of Baltimore. Last Edition, According to the Copy Printed at Rome in 1914. Revised Edition, with the Imprimatur of His Eminence Cardinal Gibbons. Baltimore: John Murphy Company, 1916. p. 243.
- Rev. Richard Stanton. A Menology of England and Wales, or, Brief Memorials of the Ancient British and English Saints Arranged According to the Calendar, Together with the Martyrs of the 16th and 17th Centuries. London: Burns & Oates, 1892. pp. 393–394.

Greek Sources

- Great Synaxaristes: (in Greek) 14 ΑΥΓΟΥΣΤΟΥ. ΜΕΓΑΣ ΣΥΝΑΞΑΡΙΣΤΗΣ.
- (in Greek) Συναξαριστής. 14 Αυγούστου. ECCLESIA.GR. (H ΕΚΚΛΗΣΙΑ ΤΗΣ ΕΛΛΑΔΟΣ).

Russian Sources

- (in Russian) 27 августа (14 августа). Православная Энциклопедия под редакцией Патриарха Московского и всея Руси Кирилла (электронная версия). (Orthodox Encyclopedia - Pravenc.ru).
