= August 1 (Eastern Orthodox liturgics) =

Day in the Eastern Orthodox liturgical calendar

Eastern Orthodox liturgical calendar
July 31	August 1	August 2
August 1 O.S. ≍ August 14 N.S. August 1 N.S ≍ July 19 O.S.

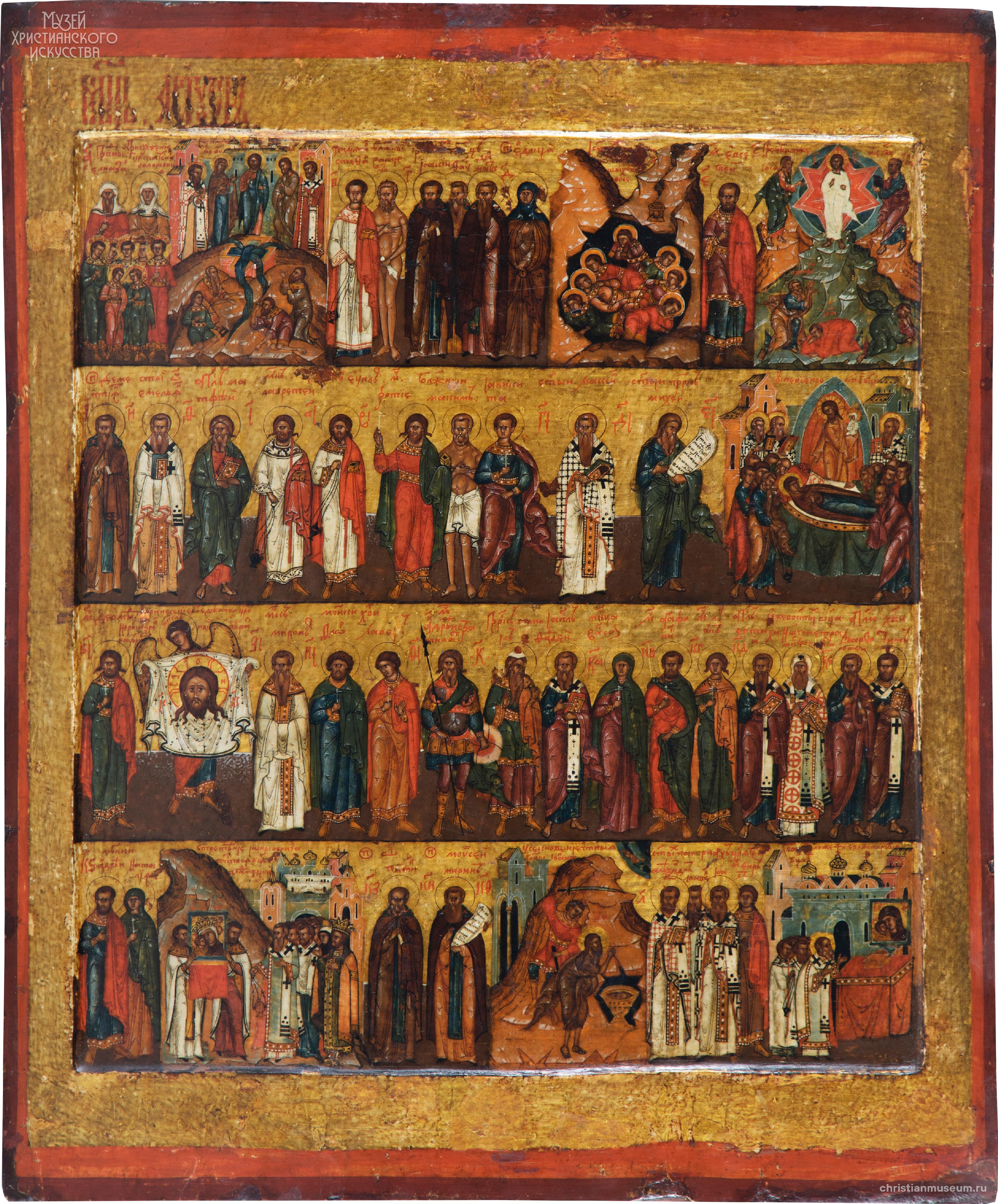
Menaion calendar icon: August. 1 day = 1 saint

August 1 in Eastern Orthodox liturgical calendars is a feast day and a day of commemoration of saints and martyrs. Although some Orthodox churches use the Revised Julian Calendar and others use the traditional Julian calendar, the fixed commemorations for their respective August 1 are broadly the same, no matter which calendar is used. (Note: Despite the dates being the same, the days to which they refer typically differ by 13 days. The notation Old Style or O.S. is sometimes used to indicate a date in the traditional Julian Calendar (the "Old Calendar"). The notation New Style or N.S. indicates a date in the Revised Julian calendar (the "New Calendar").)

== Feasts ==
- Beginning of the Dormition Fast.
- The Solemn Procession of the Precious Wood of the Life-giving Cross of Jesus Christ. (Note: In the Greek Chasoslov (Horologion) of 1897 is explained thus the derivation of this feast: "By reason of the sicknesses, often everywhere occurring in August, from of old customarily it was done at Constantinople to carry out the Venerable Wood of the Cross along the roads and streets for the sanctifying of places and for the driving away of sicknesses. On the eve (July 31), carrying it out from the imperial treasury, they placed it upon the holy table of the Great Church (in honour of Saint Sophia – the Wisdom of God). From this feastday up to the Dormition of the Most Holy Mother of God, making litia throughout all the city, they then placed it forth for all the people to venerate. This also is the Issuing-forth of the Venerable Cross".; In the Russian Church, this feast is combined also with a remembrance of the Baptism of Rus', on 1 August 988.) (Note: The Troparion in the First Tone is as follows: (in English) "O Lord, save Your people and bless Your inheritance! Grant victory to Orthodox Christians over their adversaries. And preserve Your commonwealth by the power of Your Cross."; (in Greek) "Σώσον, Κύριε, τον λαόν Σου και ευλόγησον την κληρονομίαν Σου, νίκας τοις βασιλεύσι κατά βαρβάρων δωρούμενος, και το σον φυλάττων, δια του Σταυρού Σου, πολίτευμα."; The following Sticheron of the Troparion of the Holy Cross, is chanted on three feast days in the year (instead of the Trisagion Hymn): on September 14; on the Third Sunday of Great Lent; and on August 1: (in English) "Before Your Cross we bow down, O Master, and Your Holy Resurrection, we glorify".; (in Russian) «Кресту Твоему поклоняемся, Владыко, и Святое Воскресение Твое славим».) (Note: See: (in Russian) Происхождение честных древ Животворящего Креста. Википедии. (Russian Wikipedia).)
- Baptism of Rus' (1 August 988) (Note: The Baptism of Rus' refers to the seminal event of the mass baptism of the residents of Kiev in 988 as Grand Prince Vladimir accepted Orthodox Christianity as the religion of his lands. The event, as recorded in the Primary Chronicles, has been considered the turn point for the introduction of Christianity among the eastern Slavs. "According to the chronicle this event took place on 1 August (OS) or 14 August (NS), which is now a holy day in the Ukrainian church.")
- The Feast to the All-Merciful Saviour and the Most Holy Mother of God. (Note: The Feast to the All-Merciful Saviour and the Most Holy Mother of God was established on the occasion of portents from icons of the Saviour, the Most Holy Mother of God and the Venerable Cross during the time of a battle of holy Prince Andrei Bogoliubsky (1157-1174) with the Volga Bulgars in 1164. This is the first of three feast days of the All-Merciful Saviour, celebrated in August. The second – is the Transfiguration (Preobrazhenie, Metamorphosis) of our Lord God and Saviour Jesus Christ (commemorated August 6). The third – is the Transfer from Edessa to Constantinople of the Not-Wrought-by-Hand Image of the Lord Jesus Christ (commemorated August 16, during the Afterfeast of the Dormition of the Most Holy Mother of God). These three feasts, as it were, connect together the Dormition-Uspenie Fast.) (Note: This is the first of the three feasts of the Saviour or “Spasy” in August and is popularly called the “Honey Saviour/Spas” in Ukraine because during this time beekeepers harvest honey and hold honey markets – such as the famous one at the Kyiv Caves Lavra to this day. It marks the exact day on which St Volodymyr the Great officially baptized his people, receiving Orthodox Christianity in 988, even though today that event is commemorated by Ukraine on St Volodymyr’s day. On this day water is therefore blessed. The Cross is venerated marking the victory of the armies of Rus’ over the Volga Bulgars. The feast is also called that of “the Merciful Saviour and of the Most Pure Theotokos.”) (In East Slavic use. Not observed outside of Russia/Belarus/Ukraine and their dispora)

== Saints ==
- Holy Seven Maccabees:
  - Martyrs: Abimus, Antoninus, Gurias, Eleazar, Eusabonus, Alimus, Marcellus, their mother Solomonia, and their teacher Eleazar (166 BC) (Note: "At Antioch, the martyrdom of the seven holy brothers, the Machabees, and their mother, who suffered under king Antiochus Epiphanes. Their relics were transferred to Borne, and placed in the church of St. Peter, just mentioned". (i.e. Church of St. Peter in Chains).)
- Holy Nine Martyrs of Perge in Pamphylia:
  - Leontius, Attius, Alexander, Cindeus, Minsitheus, Cyriacus, Mineon, Catanus, Eucleus (3rd century) (Note: "At Pergen, in Pamphylia, the holy martyrs Leontius, Attius, Alexander, and six husbandmen, who were beheaded in the persecution of Diocletian, under the governor Flavian.")
- Martyr Papas the New. (Note: Tied in a sack and drowned at sea; (in Greek) «Εἰς σάκκον βληθεῖς, καὶ θίβη ἐγκλεισθεῖς, καὶ εἰς θάλασσαν ριφθεῖς, τελειούται».)
- Martyr Eleazar.
- Martyr Cyricus, by beheading.
- Martyr Theodore, by the sword.
- Martyr Polyeuctus, by being buried alive in manure.
- Venerable Martyr Elessa of Kythira (375)
- Saint Timothy of Proconnesus, Wonderworker, Archbishop of Proconnesus (6th century)

== Pre-Schism Western saints ==
- Martyrs Menas, Menais, and others of England. (Note: The Greek Synaxarion says that they were martyred: "in Viglentius, near the copper tetrapyle" (four-way arch); (in Greek) "ἐν τῷ Βιγλεντίῳ, πλησίον τοῦ χαλκοῦ Τετραπύλου".)
- Child-martyr Justin, venerated in Louvre near Paris in France (c. 290)
- Saint Nemesius, a saint venerated near Lisieux in France. (Note: "In the territory of Liswin, St. Nemesius, confessor.")
- Saint Leus of Viguenza, a priest whose relics were honoured in Viguenza in Italy (4th century)
- Saint Verus, Bishop of Vienne; he attended the Council of Arles in 314 (c. 314)
- Saint Eusebius of Vercelli, Bishop (371) (Note: "At Vercelli, St. Eusebius, bishop and martyr, who for the confession of the Catholic faith, was banished to Scythopolis and thence to Cappadocia by the emperor Constantius. Afterwards returning to his church, he suffered martyrdom in the persecution of the Arians. His feast is kept on the 16th of December.")
- Saint Exuperius of Bayeux, first Bishop of Bayeux in France, he is honoured in Corbeil (405)
- Saint Ríoch, a nephew of St. Patrick, early Irish Christian missionary and Abbot of Innisboffin in Ireland (c. 490)
- Saint Almedha (Eluned, Eled, Elevetha), suffered martyrdom on a hill near Brecon in Wales (5th century)
- Saint Severus, a priest of noble family, famous for his charity, honoured from time immemorial in the village that bears his name, St Sever de Rustan (c. 500)
- Saints Friard (Friardus of Vindumitta), and Secundel (Secundellus) deacon, hermits on the Isle of Vindomitte near Nantes in Gaul (c. 577) (see also: August 2)
- Virgin-martyr Sidwell of Exeter (Sativola) (6th century) (Note: "The sacred remains of ST. SlDWELL, Virgin and Martyr, were buried in the church which still bears her name, outside the walls of Exeter. St. Sidwell, also called SATEVOLA and SlTHEFULLY, is said to have lived about the year 700, and to have been of an ancient British family. She had three sisters, also venerated as Saints - Juthwara (whose translation was celebrated at Shirburn on the 13th July), Edware, and Willgith." Her feast day is variously given as July 31, August 1 or August 2.)
- Saint Kenneth (Cenydd, Kined), a hermit who made his cell among the rocks in the Gower peninsula in Wales at a place later called Llangenydd after him (6th century)
- Saint Peregrinus, a pilgrim from Ireland who returning from a pilgrimage to the Holy Land settled as a hermit near Modena in Italy (643)
- Saint Jonatus, a monk at Elnone in Belgium; Abbot of Marchiennes (c. 643-652) and then of Elnone Abbey (c. 652-659)
- Saint Mary the Consoler, sister of St Anno, Bishop of Verona in Italy (8th century)
- Saint Æthelwold of Winchester, Bishop of Winchester (984)

== Post-Schism Orthodox saints ==
=== New martyrs and confessors ===
- New Hieromartyr Basil, Archbishop of Chernigov (1918)
- New Hieromartyr Demetrius Pavsky, Priest (1937)

== Other commemorations ==
- Finding of the relics (1882) of Bishop Nestor (Zakkis) of the Aleutians and Alaska (1882) (Note: See also: (in Russian): Нестор (Засс). (Russian Wikipedia).)
- Repose of Abbess Alexia of Nizhni-Novgorod (1940)
- Uncovering of the relics (1995) of the Venerable Sophia of Suzdal (1542)

== Icon gallery ==
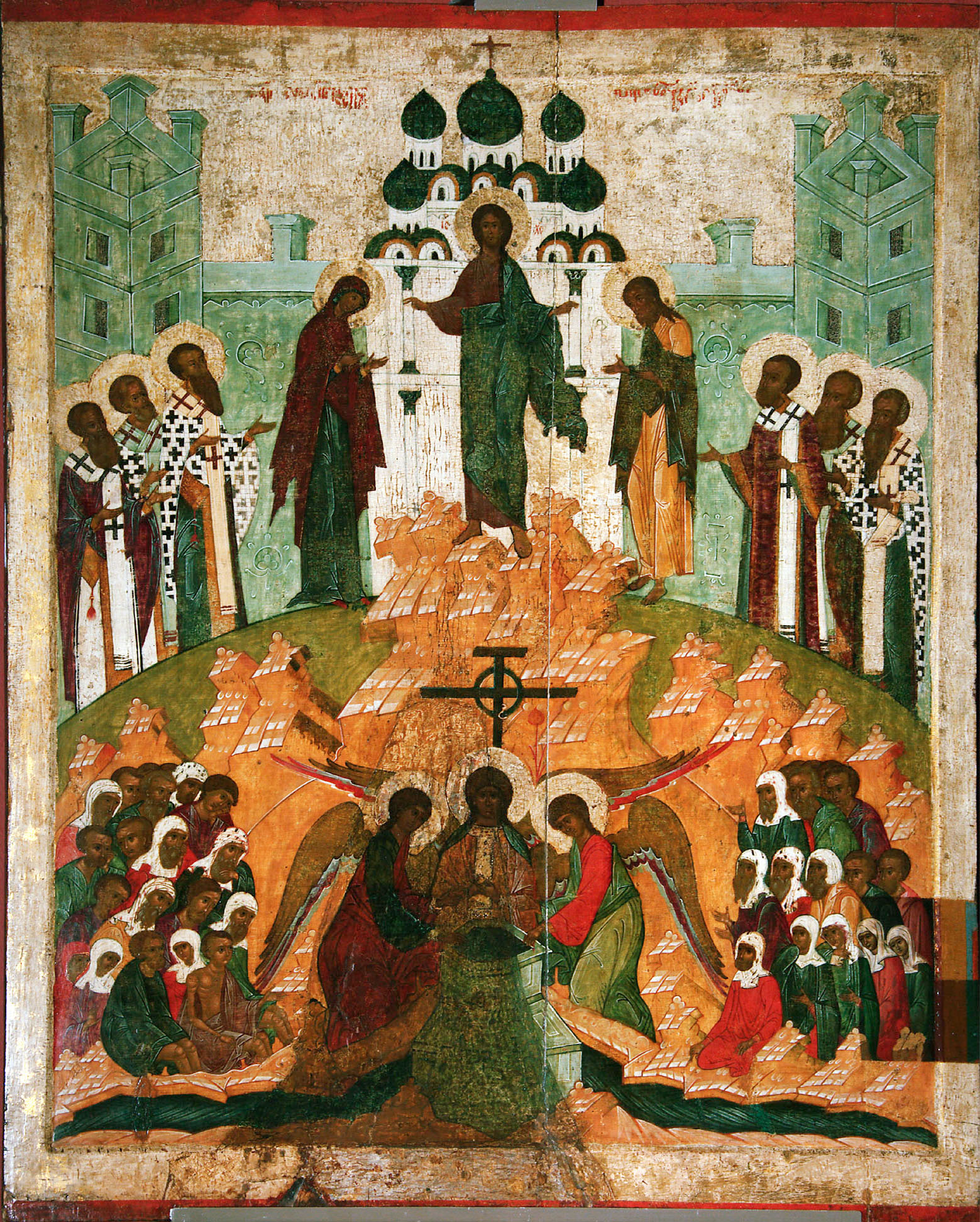
Festal icon of The Bearing (изнесение) of the Precious Wood of the Life-Giving Cross.
(circa 1510).

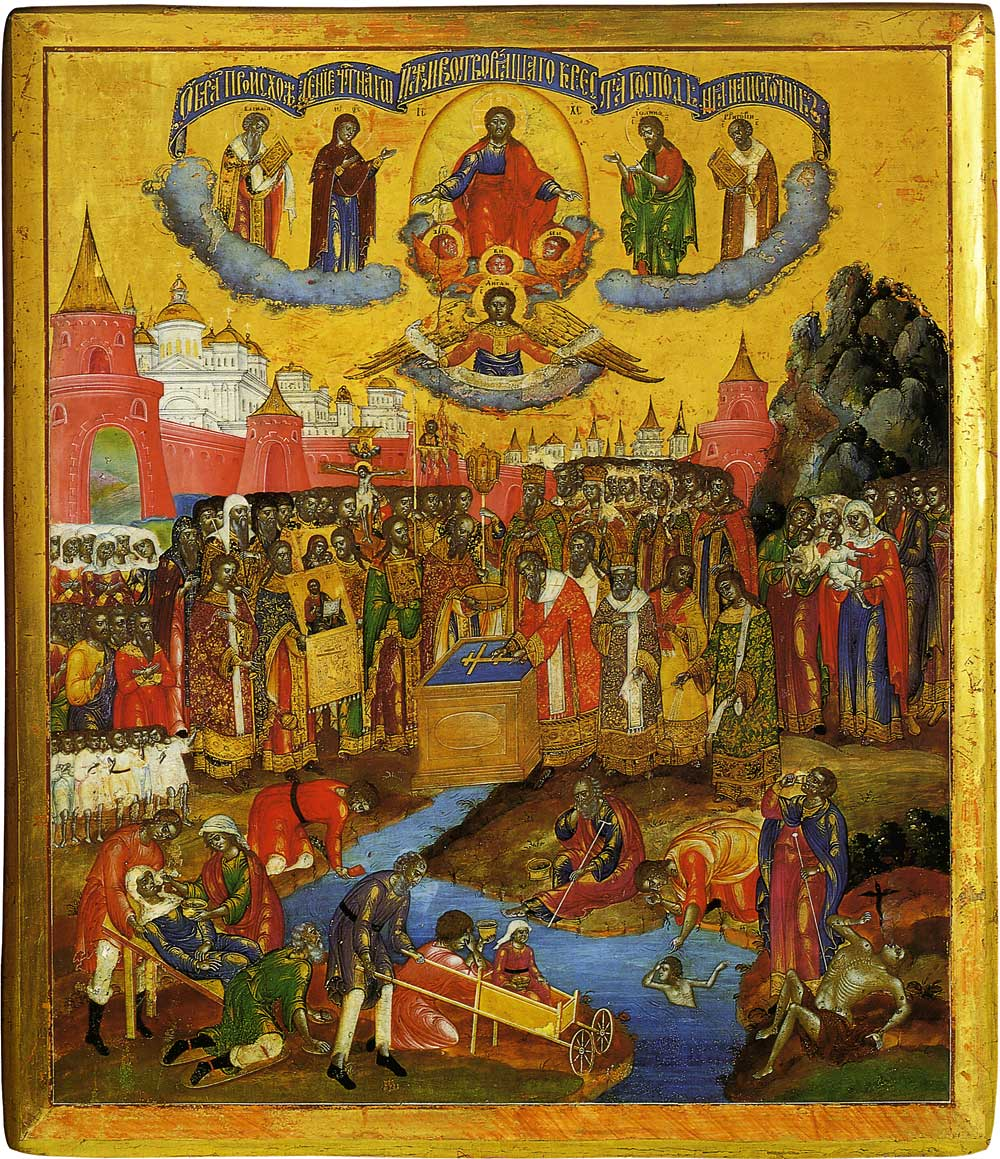
Solemn Procession of the Precious and Life-Giving Cross of the Lord, at the Spring. (Note: According to a certain account compiled in 1627 by order of Patriarch Filaret (Romanov) of Moscow (i.e.: "The Account of the Effective Rites of the Holy Cathedral and Apostolic Church of the Dormition") : On the day of the Veneration of the Cross, there is a procession, for the purpose of consecrating water and enlightening the people, throughout all the cities and villages.)
(Ural Icon, 19th century).

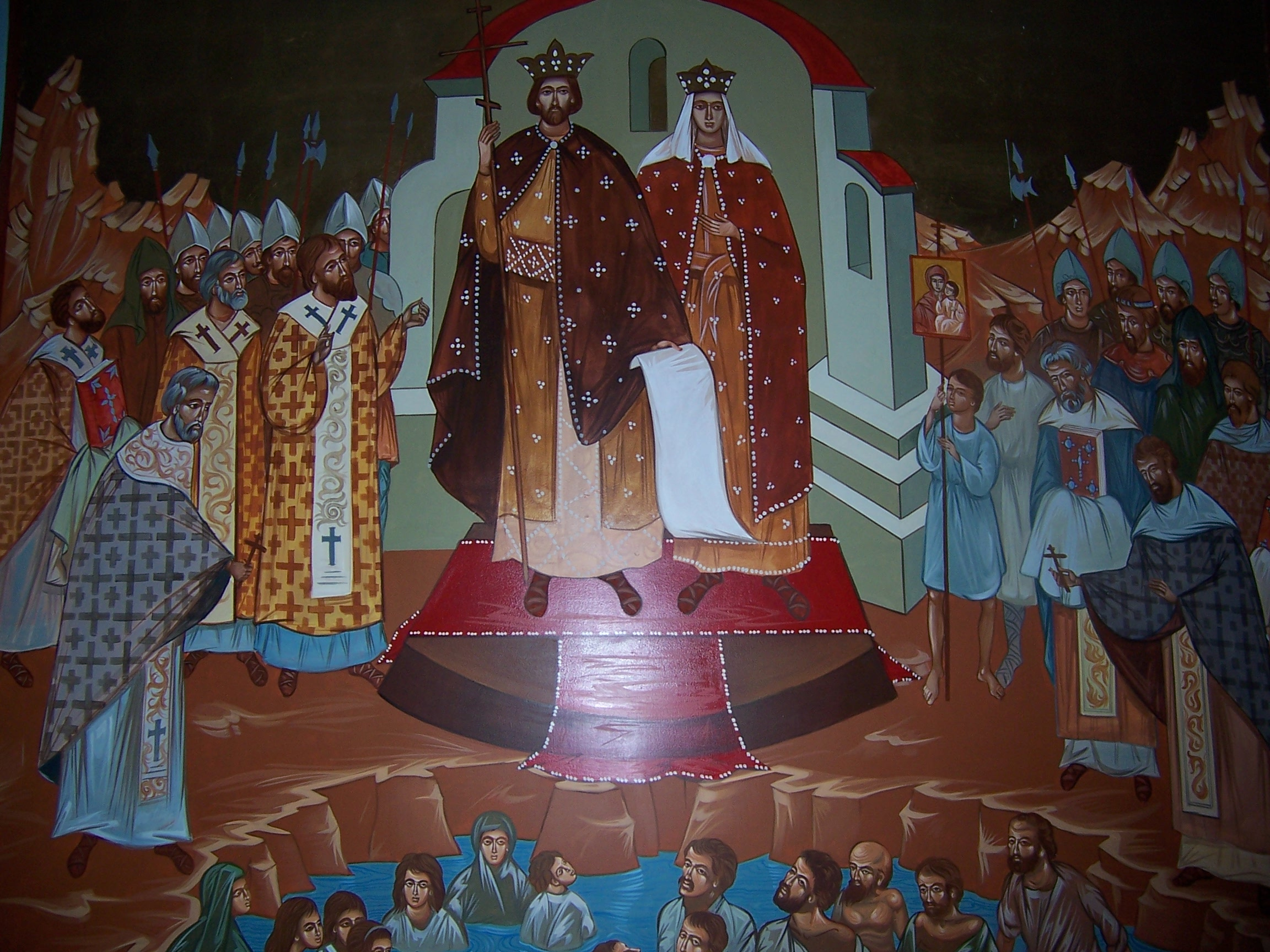
Fresco depicting the Baptism of the Kievan Rus'.

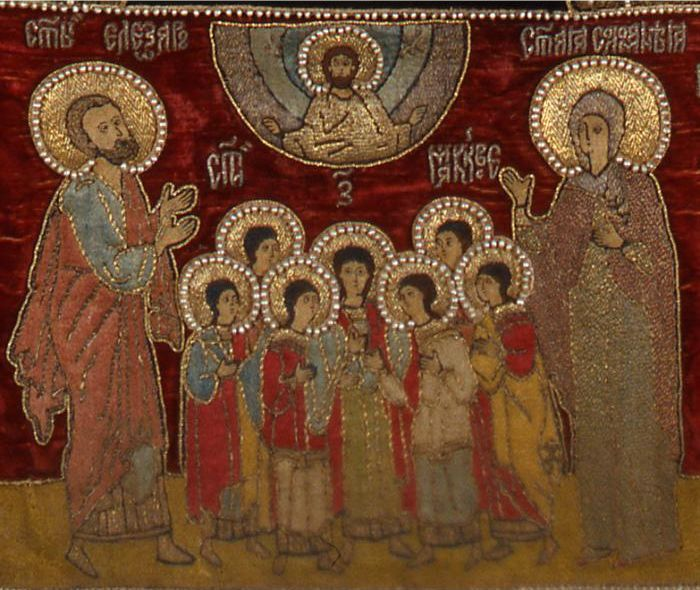
The Holy Seven Maccabees, their mother Solomonia, and their teacher Eleazar.
(Russian veil icon, 1525).

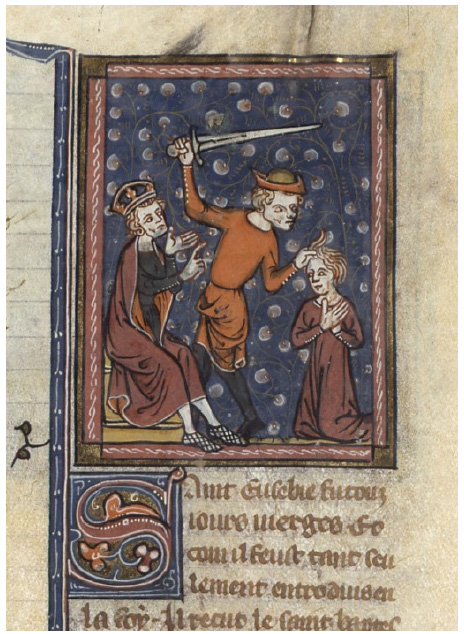
St. Eusebius of Vercelli.
(By Richard de Montbaston, 14th century).

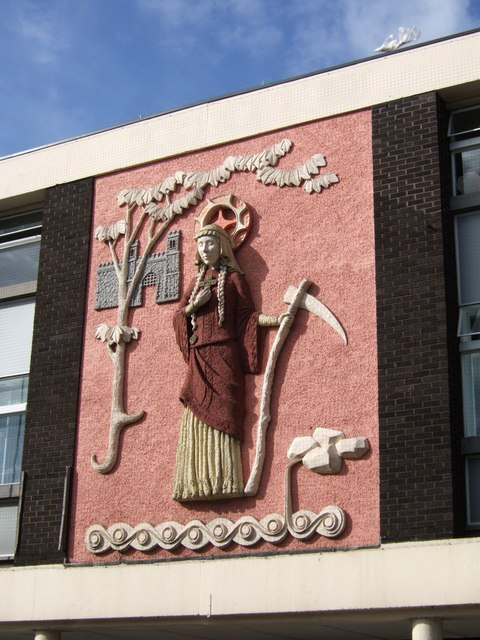
St. Sidwell of Exeter.
(Relief, on a shopping arcade in Sidwell Street, Exeter).

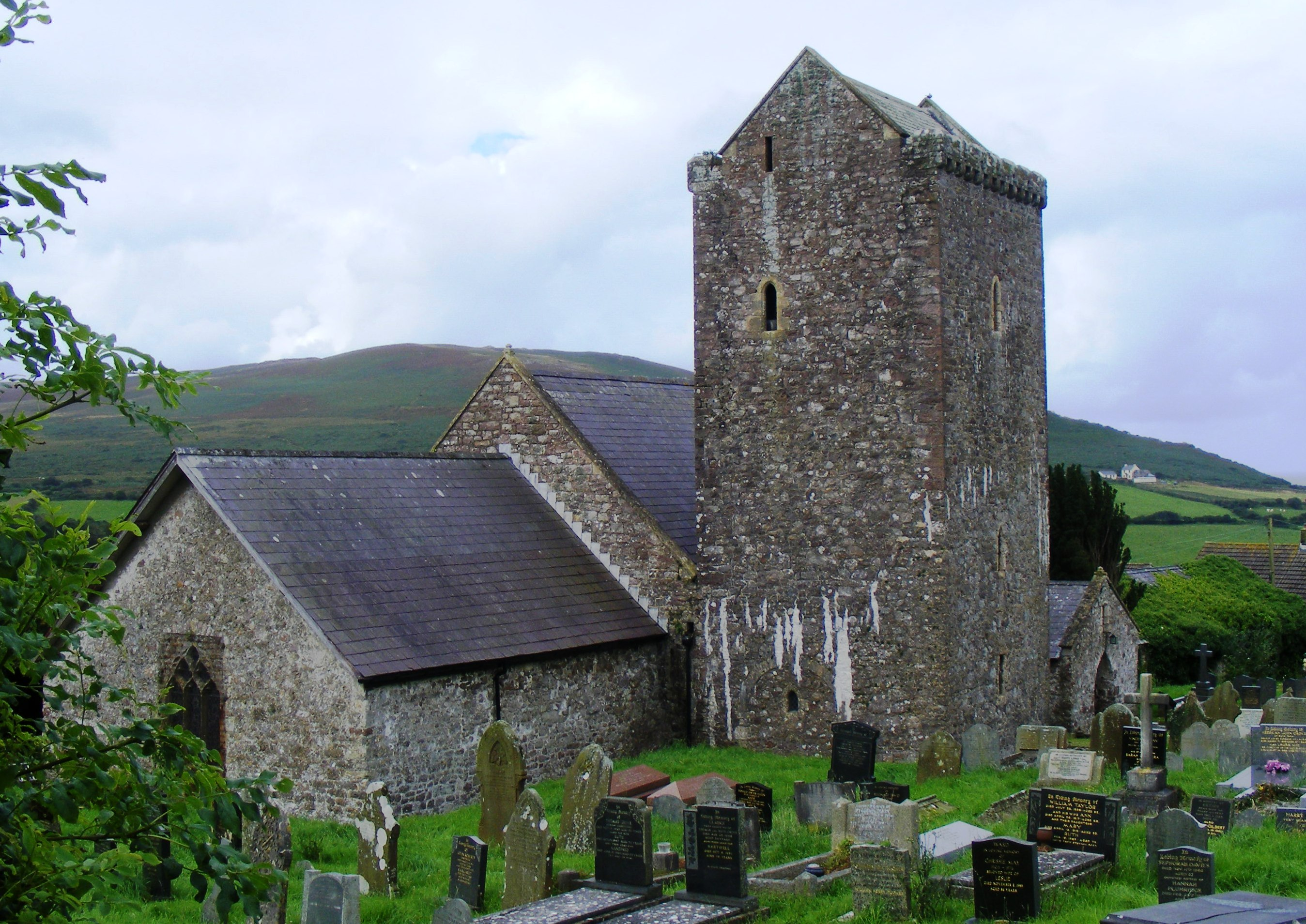
St. Cenydd's (Kenneth's) Church, Llangennith.

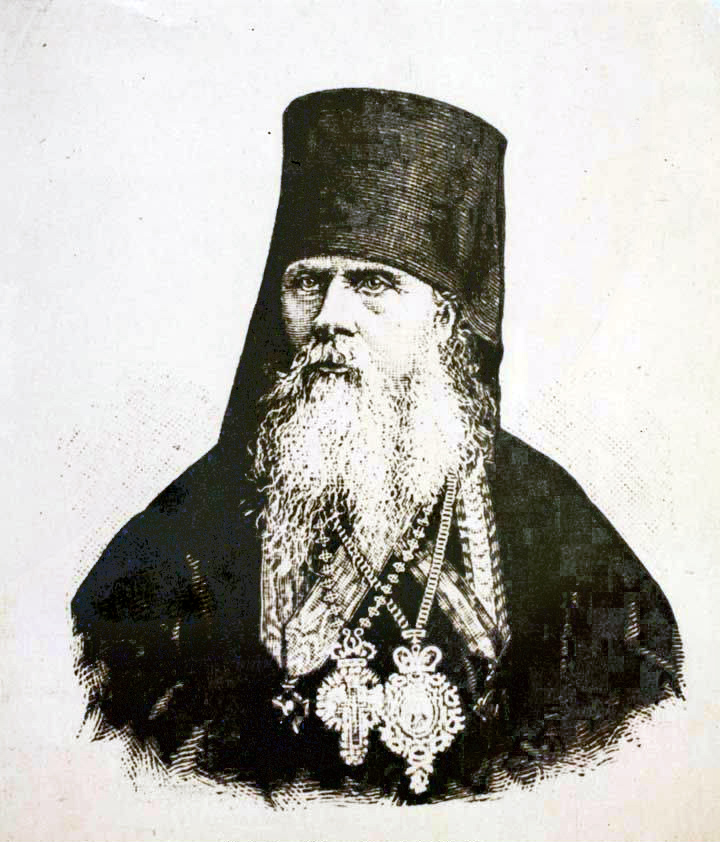
Bishop Nestor (Zakkis) of the Aleutians and Alaska.

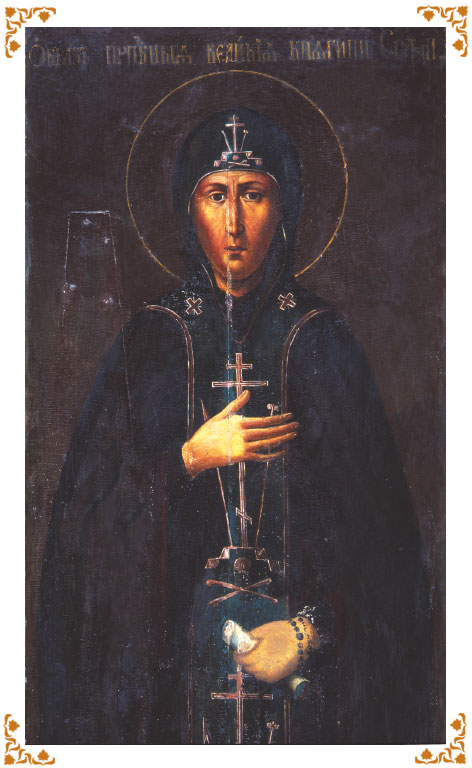
Venerable Sophia of Suzdal (Solomonia Saburova).

== Sources ==
- August 1/14. Orthodox Calendar (PRAVOSLAVIE.RU).
- August 14 / August 1. HOLY TRINITY RUSSIAN ORTHODOX CHURCH (A parish of the Patriarchate of Moscow).
- August 1. OCA - The Lives of the Saints.
- August 1. Latin Saints of the Orthodox Patriarchate of Rome.
- The Roman Martyrology. Transl. by the Archbishop of Baltimore. Last Edition, According to the Copy Printed at Rome in 1914. Revised Edition, with the Imprimatur of His Eminence Cardinal Gibbons. Baltimore: John Murphy Company, 1916. pp. 228–229.
- Rev. Richard Stanton. A Menology of England and Wales, or, Brief Memorials of the Ancient British and English Saints Arranged According to the Calendar, Together with the Martyrs of the 16th and 17th Centuries. London: Burns & Oates, 1892. pp. 375–377.

Greek Sources

- Great Synaxaristes: (in Greek) 1 ΑΥΓΟΥΣΤΟΥ. ΜΕΓΑΣ ΣΥΝΑΞΑΡΙΣΤΗΣ.
- (in Greek) Συναξαριστής. 1 Αυγούστου. ECCLESIA.GR. (H ΕΚΚΛΗΣΙΑ ΤΗΣ ΕΛΛΑΔΟΣ).

Russian Sources

- (in Russian) 14 августа (1 августа). Православная Энциклопедия под редакцией Патриарха Московского и всея Руси Кирилла (электронная версия). (Orthodox Encyclopedia - Pravenc.ru).
