= Theoclite the Wonderworker =

Eastern orthodox venerable and saint

Venerable Theoclite the Wonderworker
- Born: 9th century Theme of the Optimatoi
- Feast: 3 August
- Tradition or genre: Eastern Orthodox

Theoclite or Theoclite the Wonderworker (Greek: Θεοκλητώ η θαυματουργή) was a Byzantine and Eastern Orthodox saint of the 9th century. Living under the reign of the iconoclastic Emperor Theophilos, she distinguished herself by her numerous actions in favor of the poor and her Christian life in general. Her incorrupt relics were believed by the Eastern Orthodox to be the source of several miracles. She is commemorated on August 3rd with the title of Venerable.

== Biography ==
Theoclite was born in the Theme of the Optimatoi; her parents were named Constantine and Anastasia. Her parents, from a relatively high social background, forced her to marry a man named Zacharias, whom she is said to have guided onto the "right path".

Throughout her life, Theoclite is said to have been involved in numerous Christian works, notably by welcoming many people in need into her home and distributing significant portions of her wealth for charitable purposes. The Byzantine saint reportedly summoned her friends before her death to joyfully announce the news of her impending death.

== Legacy ==
Her incorrupt body is said to have produced miracles. She is commemorated on August 3rd and bears the title of Venerable. Her name, which means "called by God", appears in several different forms, sometimes as Θεοκλητώ (Theoklitó) and sometimes as Θεόκλητη (Theókliti), though this might possibly refer to another saint with the same name who is celebrated on August 21st in some manuscripts.

=== Eastern Orthodox liturgy ===
In Eastern Orthodox liturgy, she is honored with hymns, such as her apolytikion, which reads as follows:

Greek	Transliteration	Translation
Πέλεις πρότυπον, φιλανθρωπίας, καὶ διδάσκαλος, αὐτοθυσίας, ἀρετῆς Θεοκλητὼ ἀκροθίνιον· διακονεῖς γὰρ ἐν ζήλῳ τοῖς πένησι, καὶ ἀσθενοῦσιν ὡς Μήτηρ φιλόστοργος· ὅθεν ἅπαντες, Χριστὸν τὸν Θεὸν δοξάζομεν, τὸν σὲ ἐν οὐρανοῖς ἐν δόξῃ στέψαντα.	Pelis prótypon, philanthropías, kai didáskalos, afthysías, aretís Theoklitó akrothínion; diakonís gar en zíli tis pénisi, kai asthenoúsin os Mítir philóstorgos; óthen ápantes, Christón ton Theón doxázomen, ton se en ouranís en dóxi stépsanta.	You became a model of philanthropy, a teacher of selflessness, a pinnacle of virtue, O Theoclite; for you zealously serve the poor and the sick like a loving mother; therefore, we all glorify Christ - God, who has crowned you with glory in the heavens.
