= Dalmatius of Constantinople =

Dalmatius, Dalmatus, or Dalmatos (Ancient Greek: Δαλμάτος; died AD 440) was archimandrite of the Dalmatian Monastery in Constantinople. He also held the title Archimandrite of the Monasteries, making him the city's chief monk.

Dalmatius served in the second company of Guards under Theodosius the Great. He was married with a family. Experiencing a call to monastic life, he received instruction from Isaac of Dalmatia.

Like most of the city's monks, he was an opponent of the Nestorian heresy, and he played an important role in the downfall of Nestorius. Following Cyril of Alexandria's instructions, Dalmatius led an army of monks to the palace of Theodosius II, and shouted abuse against him, because he had sided with the Nestorians and annulled the First Council of Ephesus. Because this was the first time Dalmatius had left his monastery in 48 years, the emperor was astonished to see the holy man abroad and granted his request to hear Cyril's case, which led ultimately to Cyril's vindication.

The feast day of Saint Dalmatius is August 3.
