= Theodore of the Dardanelles =

17th-century Orthodox Christian martyr

New Martyr
- Born: Renkioi, Ottoman Empire
- Died: August 2, 1690; Çanakkale, Ottoman Empire
- Venerated in: Eastern Orthodox Church
- Major shrine: Church of Saint Xeni, Nicaea, Piraeus, Greece
- Feast: August 2

Theodore of the Dardanelles (Greek: Θεόδωρος Δαρδανελλίων; died August 2, 1690) was an Orthodox Christian neomartyr from the Dardanelles. He was executed in Çanakkale after refusing to convert to Islam.

== Life ==
Theodore was born in the village of Renkioi near the ancient city of Ophryneion along the Dardanelles, to parents named George and Kyriaki. As a young man he moved to the city of Çanakkale, where he worked in sesame oil production.

Narratives about his life state that a wealthy local Turk sought to have Theodore marry his daughter on the condition that he convert to Islam. Theodore declined, and when he later became ill, the man claimed to heal him in exchange for a promise of conversion. Theodore was accused of failing to keep the promise, and he was subsequently imprisoned and subjected to torture.

Hagiographical accounts also describe that while in prison he was visited secretly by a priest who administered the Holy Communion, and that he reported being sustained by a miraculous light. Other accounts add that he was confined in a lime pit and paraded through the city. On 2 August 1690 he was executed by beheading in front of the French consulate in Çanakkale.

== Veneration ==
The body of Theodore was initially buried in a church courtyard in Çanakkale. In 1773 the church was burned during the Russo-Turkish wars, but his relics survived. During the expulsion of the Greek population in 1922, refugees led by Father Konstantinos Oikonomou brought his skull to Greece, where it was placed in the Church of Saint Xeni in Nicaea, Piraeus, where it continues to be venerated.

His feast day is commemorated on 2 August in the Orthodox Church.
