= Isaac of Dalmatia =

Greek saint

Saint Isaac the Confessor
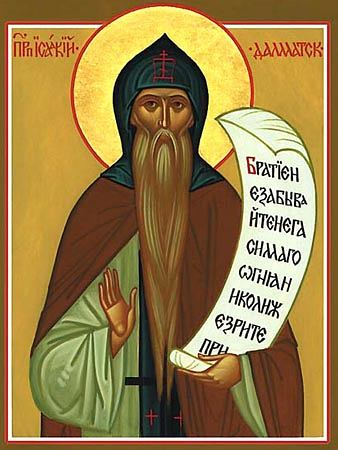
- Icon of Saint Isaac the Confessor

Venerable Confessor
- Died: May 30, 383; Constantinople (modern-day Istanbul, Turkey)
- Venerated in: Eastern Orthodox Church; Roman Catholic Church
- Feast: May 30, August 3
- Attributes: Clothed as an Eastern monk, sometimes holding a scroll with a quotation from his hagiography, sometimes carrying a paterissa (abbot's staff)
- Patronage: Romanov dynasty

Saint Isaac the Confessor, also Isaacius or Isaakios (Ancient Greek: Ἰσαάκιος or Ἰσάκιος; died May 30, 383 AD), founder of the Dalmatian Monastery in Constantinople, was a Christian monk who is honored as a saint and confessor. He is sometimes referred to as Isaac the Dalmatian, not because he came from Dalmatia, but because of the monastery which he founded.

== Life ==
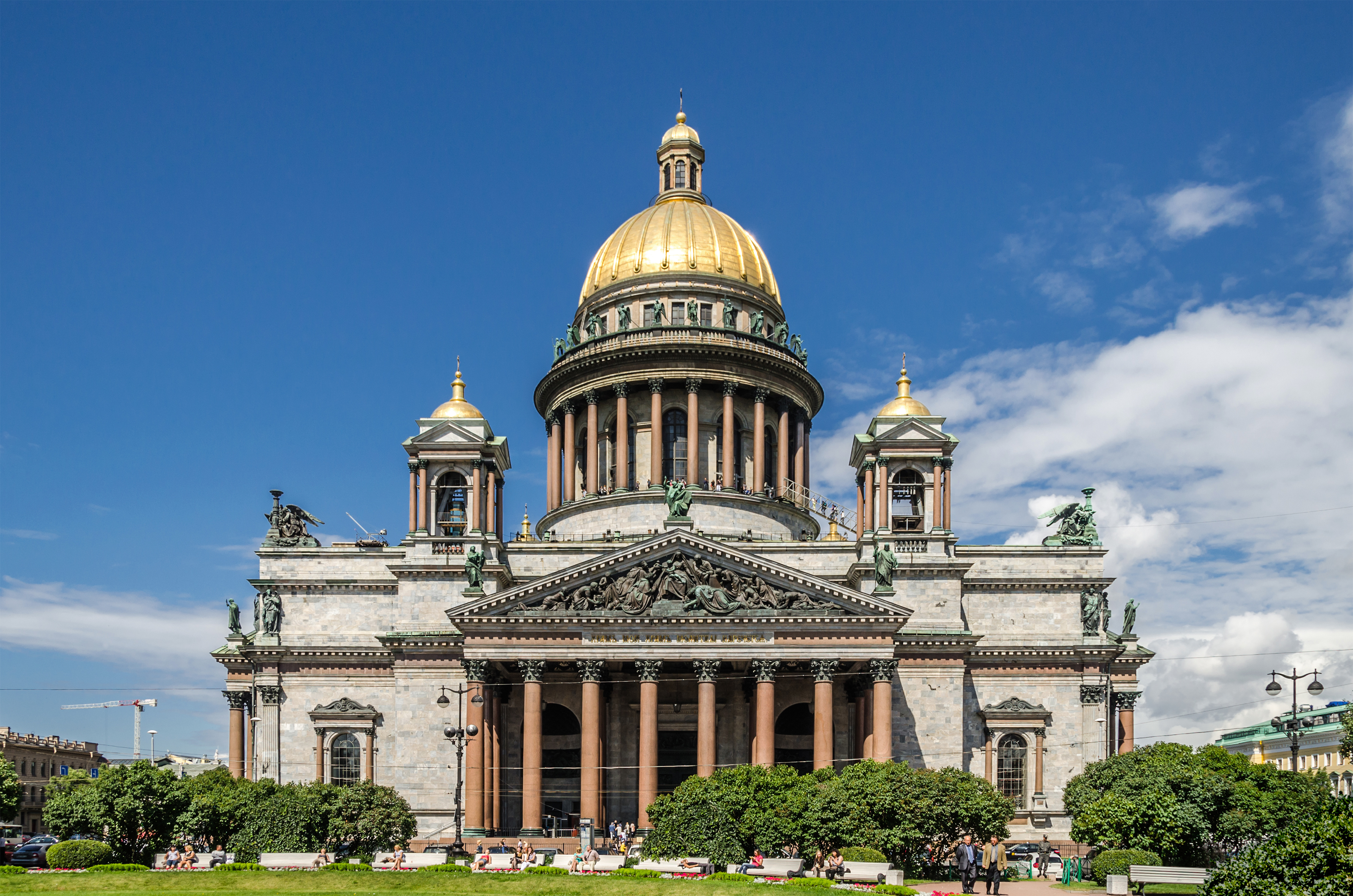
Saint Isaac's Cathedral on Saint Isaac's Square in Saint Petersburg, Russia

According to some accounts, Isaac was a Syrian, but this is uncertain. Certain details about his early life are unknown but history records that Isaac had been a hermit living in a small hut in the wilderness outside of Constantinople. In the year 378, when he heard that the Roman emperor Valens had fallen into the heresy of Arianism and was persecuting the Nicene Christians, deposing bishops, closing some churches, and turning others over to the Arians, Isaac went into the imperial city to confront the emperor. At the time, Valens was preparing a military campaign against the Goths. After several attempts to dissuade the emperor from his persecutions, Isaac prophesied that Valens would "die in flames" because of his actions. The emperor ordered that Isaac be thrown into prison, vowing that he would punish Isaac and put him to death upon his return from battle. Soon after, on August 9, 378, Valens was defeated at the Battle of Adrianople and died in a fire after taking refuge in a barn.

Valens' successor, the Emperor Theodosius I, released Isaac, outlawed Arianism and reopened the churches closed by Valens. Isaac wanted to return to monastic life in the wilderness, but a wealthy aristocrat named Saturninus built a monastery for Isaac in Constantinople, over which he became the first hegumen (abbot). Isaac is also known as a zealous defender of Christian orthodoxy at the Second Ecumenical Council, convened in Constantinople in 381.

At the end of his life, Isaac entrusted the leadership of the monastery to his closest disciple, Dalmatus, who was later himself glorified (canonized as a saint), and after whom the monastery came to be known as the Dalmatian Monastery. Isaac died in his monastery on May 30, 383, although others place his death around 396. The life of John Chrysostom includes mention of St. Isaac living into the fifth century.

Both the Eastern Orthodox and the Catholic churches have glorified Isaac as a saint. Among the former, his feast day falls on May 30, and he is also commemorated together with other saints from his monastery on August 3.

Peter the Great of Russia (reigned 1682–1725), whose birthday fell on Saint Isaac's feast day, May 30, adopted Isaac as the patron saint of the Romanov dynasty. Saint Isaac's Cathedral in the city of St Petersburg is consecrated to his honour.
